= Transcontinental flight =

Type of flight

A transcontinental flight is a non-stop passenger flight from one side of a continent to the other. The term usually refers to flights across the United States, between the East and West Coasts.

== History ==
The first transcontinental multi-stop flight across the United States was made in 1911 by Calbraith Perry Rodgers in an attempt to win the Hearst prize offered by publisher William Randolph Hearst. Hearst offered a $US50,000 prize to the first aviator to fly coast to coast, in either direction, in less than 30 days from start to finish. Previous attempts by James J. Ward and Henry Atwood had been unsuccessful.

Rodgers persuaded J. Ogden Armour, of Armour and Company, to sponsor the flight, and in return he named the plane after Armour's grape soft drink "Vin Fiz". Rodgers left from Sheepshead Bay, New York, on September 17, 1911, at 4:30 pm, carrying the first transcontinental mail pouch. He crossed the Rocky Mountains on November 5, 1911, and landed at Tournament Park in Pasadena, California, at 4:04 pm, in front of a crowd of 20,000 people. He had missed the prize deadline by 19 days. He was accompanied on the ground by a support crew that repaired and rebuilt the plane after each crash landing. The trip required 70 stops.

On December 10, 1911, Rodgers flew to Long Beach, California, and symbolically taxied his plane into the Pacific Ocean.

== Timeline of early transcontinental flights ==
- 1911 – James J. Ward, failed attempt.
- 1911 – Henry Atwood, failed attempt.
- 1911 – Calbraith Perry Rodgers – Start: September 17, 1911, at 4:30 pm; finish: November 5, 1911.
- 1912 – Robert George Fowler – Start: September 11, 1911; finish: February 8, 1912.
- 1923 – First non-stop flight from Long Island, New York to Rockwell Field, San Diego by Lt. John Macready and Lt. Oakley Kelly in a Fokker T-2
- 1929 – The Buhl Airsedan "Spokane Sun-God" was the first aircraft to make a non-stop US transcontinental round-trip flight on August 15, 1929 (Nick Mamer and Art Walker flew it from Spokane, Washington, to New York City and back between August 15 and 21, 1929, taking 120 hours 1 minute 40 seconds).
- 1930 – Frank Hawks flew from San Diego to New York in a towed glider leaving San Diego March 30, 1930, and arriving in New York eight days later.
- 1932 – First scheduled cross-country through passenger flights (no change of plane).
- 1933 – Transcontinental passenger flights in as little as 20 hours on the Boeing 247.
- 1934 – First three-stop airline flights (TWA DC-2s).
- 1946 – First one-stop airline flights (United DC-4s and TWA Constellations).
- 1953 – First sustained nonstop airline flights (TWA may have flown some LA-NY nonstops in 1947).
- 1957 – First transcontinental flight to average supersonic speed. John Glenn flew from Naval Air Station Los Alamitos, California to Floyd Bennett Field, New York in 3 hours and 23 minutes.

== Transcontinental air speed records ==
In-flight and on-ground time are counted after the earliest flights

Year	Date	Time	Direction	Pilot	Aircraft	Notes and reference
1911	September 17	3 days, 10 hours, 14 minutes	East to West	Calbraith Perry Rodgers	Vin Fiz Flyer	The first transcontinental flight. It took fifty days (3 days, 10 hours, 14 minutes actual flying time). Rodgers made it in some seventy hops, flying a Wright biplane which was damaged and repaired so many times en route that nothing remained of the original machine at the finish but the drip pan and the vertical rudder.
1919	October 11	3 days, 3 hours, 5 minutes	East to West	Belvin Maynard	DH-4	On the first leg of the "Transcontinental Air Race of 1919" which saw 33 planes cross the U.S. with 8 completing the round-trip (out of 67 which began the trip). Nine deaths occurred during what was officially the U.S. Army's "Transcontinental Reliability and Endurance Test"
1922	September 4	21 hours, 19 minutes	East to West	Jimmy Doolittle	DH-4	Pablo Beach, Florida, to San Diego, California, with only one refueling stop
1923	May 2–3	26 hours, 50 minutes, 38.4 seconds	East to West	Lt John A. Macready and Lt Oakley G. Kelly	Fokker T-2	First nonstop transcontinental flight: Roosevelt Field, Long Island to Rockwell Field, North Island, San Diego. Longest straight-line distance covered nonstop until then
1924	June 23	20 hours, 48 minutes	East to West	Russell Maughan	Curtiss P-1 Hawk	First transcontinental flight "during hours of daylight". New York City to San Francisco, average speed 128 miles per hour
1929	February 4	18 hours 22 minutes	West to East	Frank Hawks	Lockheed Air Express	Los Angeles Van Nuys to New York Roosevelt Field nonstop, 2481 miles, with mechanic/fueller Oscar Grubb
1929	June 27	19 hours, 10 minutes	East to West	Frank Hawks	Lockheed Air Express	Roosevelt Field, Long Island to Los Angeles (Van Nuys) nonstop
1929	June 28	17 hours, 36 minutes	West to East	Frank Hawks	Lockheed Air Express	Los Angeles (Van Nuys) to Roosevelt Field, Long Island nonstop
1929	August 15	120 hr 1 min 40 sec	West to East and East to West	Nick Mamer and Art Walker	Buhl Airsedan "Spokane Sun-God"	First non-stop transcontinental round-trip flight from Spokane, Washington to New York City and back
1930	April 20	14 hr 45 min	West to East	Charles A. Lindbergh	Lockheed Sirius	Los Angeles (Glendale) to New York Roosevelt Field, one stop
1930	May 27	18 hr 43 min	East to West	Roscoe Turner	Lockheed Air Express	Roosevelt Field, Long Island to Los Angeles (Glendale), one stop
1930	August 13	12 hr 25 min	West to East	Frank Hawks	Travel Air "Mystery S"	Los Angeles (Glendale) to Valley Stream, Long Island; three stops
1931	September 4	11 hr 16 min 10 sec	West to East	Jimmy Doolittle	1931 Laird Super Solution	Burbank CA to Newark NJ, three stops
1932	August 29	10 hr 19 min	West to East	Jimmy Haizlip	Wedell-Williams Model 44	Burbank to New York Floyd Bennett; two stops. Completed after winning the 2nd annual Bendix Trophy race.
1932	November 14	12 hr 33 min	East to West	Roscoe Turner	Wedell-Williams Model 44	New York Floyd Bennett to Burbank, California; three stops
1933	July 1	11 hr 30 min	East to West	Roscoe Turner	Wedell-Williams Model 44	New York Floyd Bennett to Burbank, California; four stops
1933	September 24–25	10 hr 5 min 30 sec	West to East	Roscoe Turner	Wedell-Williams Model 44	Burbank, California to New York Floyd Bennett; two stops
1936	January 13	9 hr 27 min 10sec	West to East	Howard Hughes	Northrop Gamma	Burbank, California to Newark, New Jersey nonstop
1937	January 19	7 hr 28 min 25 sec	West to East	Howard Hughes	Hughes H-1 Racer	nonstop Burbank, California to overhead Newark Airport, NJ; 2445 miles
1939	February 11	7 hr ? min	West to East	Benjamin S. Kelsey	XP-38	7 hr 43 min March Field, California to overhead Mitchel Field, New York including 41 min on ground at Amarillo and Dayton
1945	January 9	6 hr 4 min	West to East	Curtin L. Reinhardt	C-97 Stratofreighter	Seattle to Washington, D.C., average speed 383 mph
1945	May 1	5 hr 40 min	West to East	Najeeb Halaby	Lockheed YP-80 Shooting Star	Muroc AFB to Patuxent River NAS
1945	December 8	5 hr 17 min	West to East	Glen Edwards and Lt. Col. Henry E. Warden	XB-42 Mixmaster	Captain Glen Edwards and Lt. Col. Henry E. Warden set a transcontinental record flying the XB-42 from Long Beach, California to Bolling Field in Washington DC (2301 miles) in 5 hours 17 minutes, average 435 mph .
1945	December 11	5 hr 27 min 8 sec	West to East	Col C. S. Irvine	Boeing B-29	Burbank, California to overhead Floyd Bennett Field, New York; average 450 mph for 2459 miles
1946	January 26	4 hr 13 min 26 sec	West to East	Col W. H. Councill	Lockheed P-80	Long Beach, California to overhead La Guardia Airport, New York; 2460 miles nonstop, unrefuelled
1947	September 3	7 hr 00 min 04 sec	East to West	Paul Mantz	North American P-51	La Guardia Airport, NY to Burbank, California, 2459 miles
1949	February 5	6 hr 17 min 39 sec	West to East	Fred Davis	Lockheed L649	Delivery flight of Eastern Air Lines Constellation, Burbank to La Guardia
1949	February 8	3 hr 46 min	West to East		B-47 Stratojet	Larson AFB, Moses Lake, Washington to Andrews AFB near Washington DC, 607.8 mph average
1950	January 22	4 hr 53 min	West to East	Paul Mantz	P-51C	Burbank to passing La Guardia, average 503 mph
1954	January 2	4 hr 8 min 5 sec	West to East	Col Willard Millikan	North American F-86F	Los Angeles LAX to overhead New York Floyd Bennett, 2468 miles; time includes fuel stop at Offutt AFB
1954	March 30	4 hr 24 min 17 sec	West to East	Joe DeBona	North American P-51C	Los Angeles LAX nonstop to New York Idlewild, 2474 miles – still the prop record (560 mph)
1954	April 1	3 hr 45 min 30 sec	West to East	LtCdr Francis Brady	Grumman F9F-7 Cougar	San Diego North Island to New York Floyd Bennett, 2442 miles, nonstop, one aerial refuelling
1955	March 9	3 hr 46 min 33.6 sec	West to East	Lt Col Robert Scott	Republic F-84F	Los Angeles LAX to overhead New York Floyd Bennett, 2468 miles; two aerial refuellings
1955	May 21	5 hr 28 min	East to West	Lieut John Conroy	North American F-86	New York Mitchel Field to Los Angeles Van Nuys, 2481 miles, three stops
1957	March 21	5 hr 15 min	East to West	Cdr Dale Cox	Douglas A3D	nonstop unrefuelled New York Floyd Bennett to Los Angeles LAX
1957	March 23	3 hr 39 min 24 sec	West to East		Douglas A3D	Burbank CA to overhead Miami MCAS, FL
1957	May 19	3 hr 38 min	West to East		N American F-100F	Palmdale CA to McGuire AFB, NJ
1957	July 16	3 hr 23 min 8.4 sec	West to East	Major John H. Glenn, Jr., USMC	Vought F8U-1P Crusader	"Project Bullet" non-stop from NAS Los Alamitos, California 2455 miles to Floyd Bennett Field, New York averaging Mach 1.1, despite three refuelings from AJ piston-engine tankers during which speed dropped below 300 mph. Glenn's on-board reconnaissance camera recorded the first continuous panoramic photograph of the United States.
1957	November 27	3 hr 5 min 39.2 sec	West to East	Lieutenant Gustav Klatt	F-101 Voodoo	"Operation Sun Run", RF-101C refuelled four times by KC-135s; Ontario, California to overhead Floyd Bennett Field, New York, 781.7 mph
1961	May 24	2 hr 47 min 18 sec	West to East	Lieutenant Richard F. Gordon, Jr., U.S. Navy	McDonnell F4H	Ontario, California to overhead Floyd Bennett Field, New York; three aerial refuellings from A3Ds
1962	March 5	2 hr 1 min 39 sec	West to East	Robert G. Sowers	Convair B-58	overhead Los Angeles to overhead New York; one aerial refuelling
1990	March 6	1 hr 7 min 53.69 sec	West to East	Lt Col Ed Yeilding and Lt Col Joseph T. Vida	SR-71A Blackbird 61-7972	On delivery flight to the Smithsonian Institution, where the aircraft is now on display at the Smithsonian's Udvar-Hazy center, this SR-71 set the current transcontinental record. Yeilding and Vida crossed the west coast near Ventura, CA and, 2,404.5 miles later, crossed the east coast near Salisbury, MD averaging 2,124.51 mph
2003	February 5	2 hr 56 min 20 sec	West to East	Steve Fossett, Douglas Travis	Cessna Citation X	San Diego to Charleston SC, 2150 great-circle miles; fastest transcon flight by a subsonic aircraft
2003	February 6	3 hr 51 min 52 sec	West to East	Steve Fossett, Joseph Ritchie	Piaggio Avanti	San Diego to Charleston SC; fastest transcon flight by a turboprop
2003	November 5	3 hr 55 min 12 sec	East to West	Mike Bannister and Les Broadie	Concorde G-BOAG	Flying to museum at retirement of the aircraft, New York to Seattle

== Junior transcontinental air speed record ==
For the junior record only in-flight time is counted at a certain speed

Year	Date	Time	Pilot	Aircraft	Notes and reference
1928			Richard James (aviator)	Travel Air	Previous "record" of 48 hours, set last year by 18-year-old Richard James, was spread over a month elapsed time.
1930	October 4, 1930	East to West in 23 hours, 47 minutes	Robert Nietzel Buck	Pitcairn PA-6 Mailwing	On October 4, 1930, Robert beat the junior transcontinental air speed record of Eddie August Schneider in his PA-6 Pitcairn Mailwing he named "Yankee Clipper". His time was 23 hours, 47 minutes of elapsed flying time. Robert said on February 6, 2005: "I was the youngest to fly coast to coast and that record still stands. I had my license at 16 and after that, they raised the minimum age to 17. With that change, no one could break my record."
1930	August 18, 1930	East to West in 29 hours, 55 minutes	Eddie August Schneider	Cessna	Leaving from Westfield, New Jersey on August 14, 1930, to Los Angeles, California in 4 days with a combined flying time of 29 hours and 55 minutes. He lowered the East to West record by 4 hours and 22 minutes. He then made the return trip from Los Angeles to Roosevelt Field, New York in 27 hours, 19 minutes, lowering the West to East record by 1 hour and 36 minutes. His total elapsed time for the round trip was 57 hours, 14 minutes.
1930		East to West in 32 hours ? minutes	Frank Goldsborough		Combined East to West and West to East in 62 hours and 58 minutes.

== Women's transcontinental air speed record ==
For the women's record, only in-flight time is counted

Year	Date	Time	Pilot	Aircraft	Notes and reference
1930		13 hours, 21 minutes	Ruth Nichols		
1933		13 hours, 7 minutes, 30 seconds	Amelia Earhart		
1934		10 hours, 5 minutes	Laura Ingalls		

== See also ==
- World record
- Dawn-to-dusk transcontinental flight across the United States
- Flight altitude record
- Transcontinental railroad
- Flyover country

== Bibliography ==
- Glines, Carroll V. 1995. Roscoe Turner; Aviation's Master Showman. Smithsonian Institution Press ISBN 1-56098-798-7
- Kinert, Reed. 1967. Racing Planes and Air Races: A Complete History, Vol.2 1924–1931. Aero Publishers Inc ASIN B000J40KCU
