= Calbraith Perry Rodgers =

American aviator

Calbraith Perry Rodgers Jr.
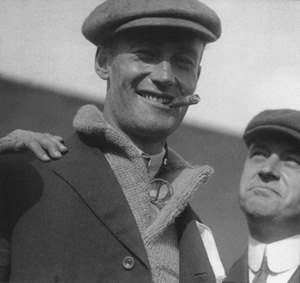
- Rodgers in 1911
- Born: January 12, 1879; Pittsburgh, Pennsylvania, U.S.
- Died: April 3, 1912 (aged 33); Long Beach, California, U.S.
- Cause of death: Plane crash
- Resting place: Allegheny Cemetery
- Occupation: Aviator
- Years active: 1911-1912
- Era: Pioneer Era
- Known for: 49th licensed aviator in the world, completed the world’s first transcontinental flight
- Height: 6 ft 4 in (193 cm)
- Spouse: Mabel Avis Graves Rodgers
- Parent(s): Calbraith Perry Rodgers Sr. and Maria Chambers
- Relatives: Oliver Hazard Perry; Matthew Calbraith Perry

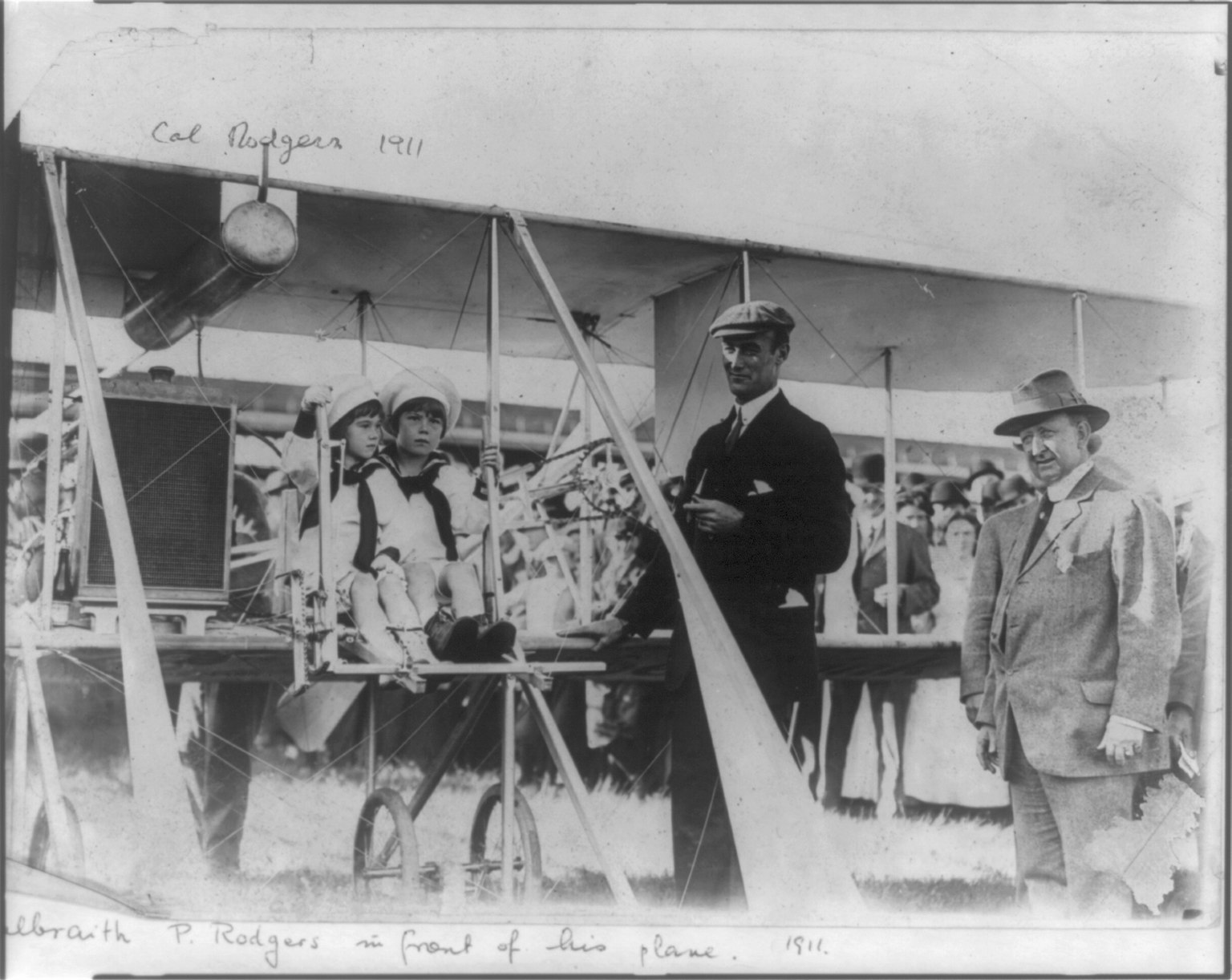
Cal letting children sit in the pilot's seat. A smoker, Cal flew with a lit bit of burning chaw, for his cigar, though his gas tank is right over his head.

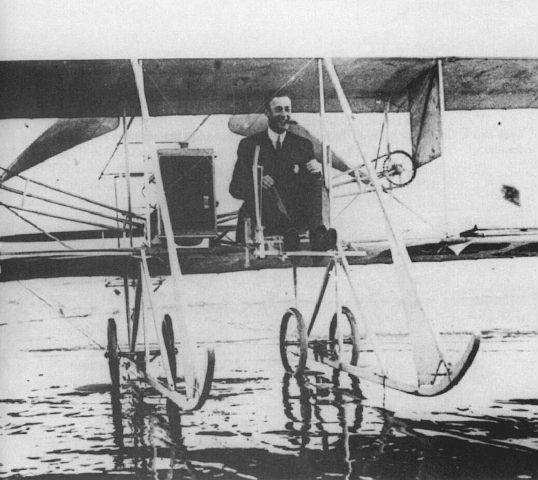
End of the flight as Cal rolls 'Vin Fiz's' wheels in the Pacific Ocean. *Note the gas tank has been changed to a new position or been optically removed from the photo.

Calbraith Perry Rodgers Jr. (January 12, 1879 – April 3, 1912) was an American aviation pioneer. He made the first transcontinental airplane flight across the U.S. from September 17, 1911, to November 5, 1911, with dozens of stops, both intentional and accidental. The feat made him a national celebrity, but he was killed in a crash a few months later at an exhibition in California.

== Early life ==
Rodgers was born on January 12, 1879, in Pittsburgh, Pennsylvania, to Calbraith Perry Rodgers and Maria Chambers Rodgers. His father, an Army captain, died on August 23, 1878, prior to his birth. Among his ancestors, Rodgers had Commodores John Rodgers, who was his paternal grandfather, Oliver Hazard Perry, his paternal great-grand uncle, and Matthew Calbraith Perry, his paternal great-grandfather. He was a cousin to John Rodgers, a naval aviation pioneer who would become known for setting the record of longest non-stop flight by seaplane of 1992 miles (3206 km) on an attempt to fly from San Francisco to Honolulu in 1925.

In 1885, Rodgers contracted scarlet fever, which left him deaf in one ear and hearing impaired in the other, which effectively barred him from following the family tradition of naval service. He received his education first at home and then at the Mercersburg Academy. In 1902, Rodgers joined his mother and sister in New York City. He became a member of the New York Yacht Club, and besides boating he rode motorcycles and drove cars. In 1906 he married Mabel Avis Graves; they had no children. The Rodgers resided in Havre de Grace, Maryland.

== Aviation ==
In June 1911, Rodgers visited his cousin John, a naval aviator, who since March was studying at the Wright Company factory and attending flying school in Dayton, Ohio. Rodgers became interested in aviation. He received 90 minutes of flying lessons from Orville Wright, and purchased a Wright Flyer with John. On August 7, 1911, he took his official flying examination at Huffman Prairie and became the 49th aviator licensed to fly by the Fédération Aéronautique Internationale. He was one of the first civilians to purchase an airplane.

Instead of flying home, Rodgers entered the 1911 Chicago International Aviation Meet, where he competed with the leading aviators of the time. He set several records, including the duration record, and won $11,285 in prize money. At over 200 pounds and at a height of 6 ft, 4 inches, Rodgers also was considered the world's "largest" aviator at the time.

== Cross-country flight ==
On October 10, 1910, publisher William Randolph Hearst offered the Hearst prize, US$50,000 to the first aviator to fly coast to coast, in either direction, in less than 30 days from start to finish. Rodgers persuaded J. Ogden Armour, of Armour and Company, to sponsor the flight, and in return he named the plane, a Wright Model EX, after Armour's grape soft drink Vin Fiz. A special train of three cars, including sleeper, diner, and shop-on-wheels full of spare parts, was assembled to follow Rodgers, who planned to fly above the railroad tracks. A competitor, James J. Ward, was also departing from New York in a Curtiss Pusher. He crashed and dropped out before he left New York state.

Rodgers left from Sheepshead Bay, New York, on September 17, 1911, at 4:30 pm. He reached Chicago, the only required stop, on October 8, 1911. His arrival to Chicago attracted national attention.

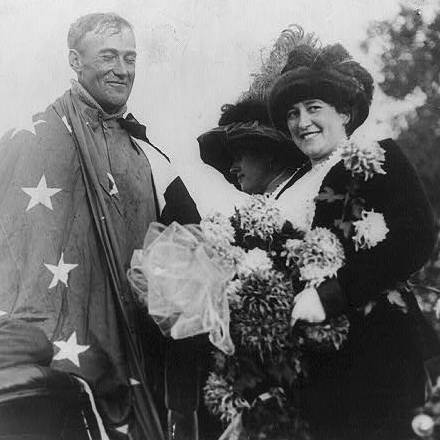
Rodgers in Pasadena

To avoid the Rocky Mountains, he took a southerly route, flying through the Midwest until reaching Texas. He turned west after passing San Antonio. On November 5, 1911, he landed at Tournament Park in Pasadena, California, at 4:04 pm in front of 20,000 people, missing the prize deadline by 19 days. He left Pasadena on November 12, but crashed at Compton. After the Vin Fiz was repaired, on December 10, 1911, he reached Long Beach, California, flew some time above the Pacific Ocean, landed on a beach and taxied the plane into the ocean. About 50,000 people came to witness the completion of the first transcontinental east–west flight.

Rodgers had carried the first transcontinental U.S. Mail pouch. The trip required 70 stops and endured countless crashes and aircraft malfunctions. Rodgers paid $70 a week to the Wright brothers' technician, Charlie Taylor, who followed the Vin Fiz by train and performed necessary maintenance or repairs. The next transcontinental flight was made by Robert G. Fowler.

== Death ==
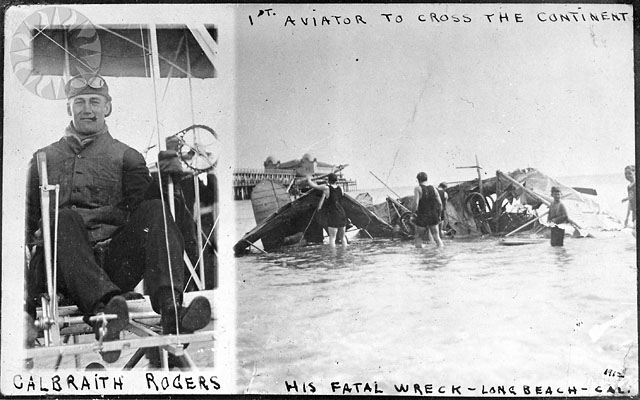
Rodgers in 1912 fatal crash

On April 3, 1912, while making an exhibition flight over Long Beach, California, he flew into a flock of birds, causing the plane to crash into the ocean. His neck was broken and his thorax damaged by the engine of the airplane. He died a few moments later, a few hundred feet from where the Vin Fiz ended its transcontinental flight. The aircraft in this last flight was the spare Model B he had carried in the special train during the transcontinental flight, rather than the Vin Fiz. The Vin Fiz itself was later given to the Smithsonian Institution by Calbraith's widow, Mabel Rodgers, and is now on display at the National Air and Space Museum. According to contemporary records, his was the 127th airplane fatality since aviation began, and he was the 22nd American aviator to die in an accident. He was also the first pilot who fatally crashed as a result of a bird strike.

Rodgers was interred at Allegheny Cemetery in his hometown of Pittsburgh.

Rodgers was posthumously inducted into the National Aviation Hall of Fame in 1964.

== See also ==
- Harry Nelson Atwood, who previously attempted a transcontinental flight
- List of fatalities from aviation accidents
