= Salduro, Utah =

Salduro
- Ghost town
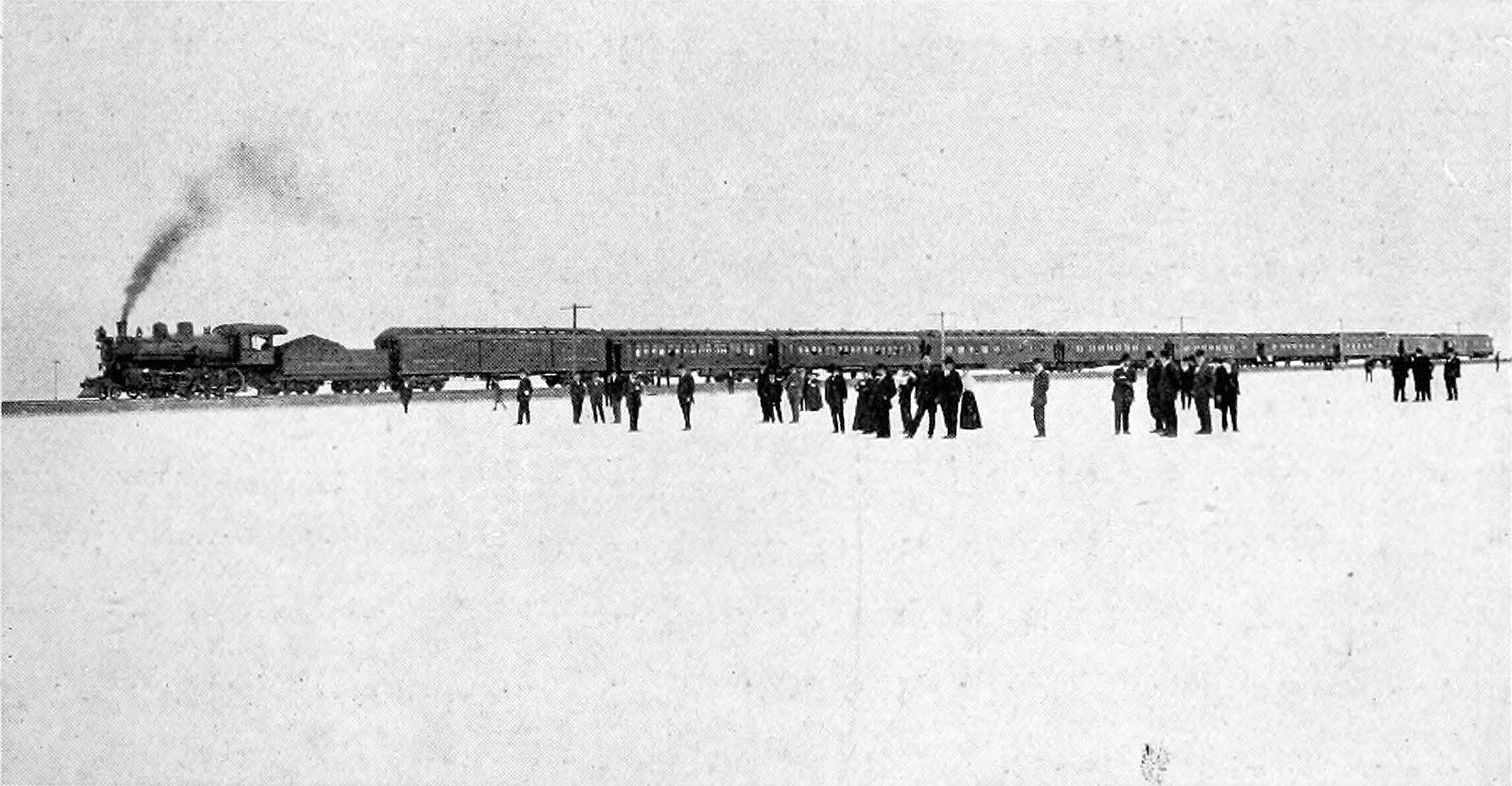
- Western Pacific Railroad in Salduro, 1911

- Location within Utah Location within the United States
- Coordinates: 40°44′06″N 113°51′23″W
- Country: United States
- State: Utah
- County: Tooele
- Elevation: 4,219 ft (1,286 m)
- Time zone: UTC-7 (Mountain (MST))
  - Summer (DST): UTC-6 (MDT)
- GNIS feature ID: 1437674

Salduro (also Salduro Siding) is a ghost town located in Tooele County, Utah, United States.

== Description ==
The name "Salduro" is a combination of Spanish words sal and duro and means "hard salt". The settlement was located on the geologically significant Salduro Salt Marsh, also known as the Bonneville Salt Flats. Bonneville Speedway is located approximately 1 mi (1.6 km) north of Salduro.

== History ==
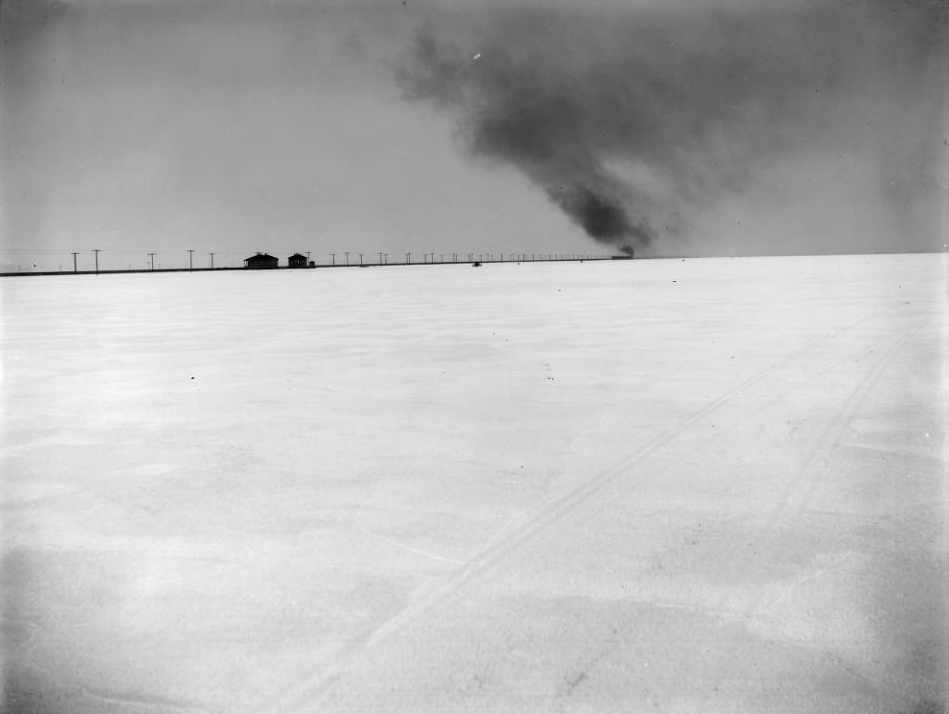
Eastbound Western Pacific Railroad passenger train crossing the Bonneville Salt Flats near Salduro (1912).

Salduro formed next to the Western Pacific Railroad, which was completed in the early 1900s. Significant salt beds were identified during the construction of the railroad, and several mining claims soon followed. After several years of unprofitable attempts to produce salt, the claims were leased by the Capell Salt Company, which erected a small mill near Salduro.

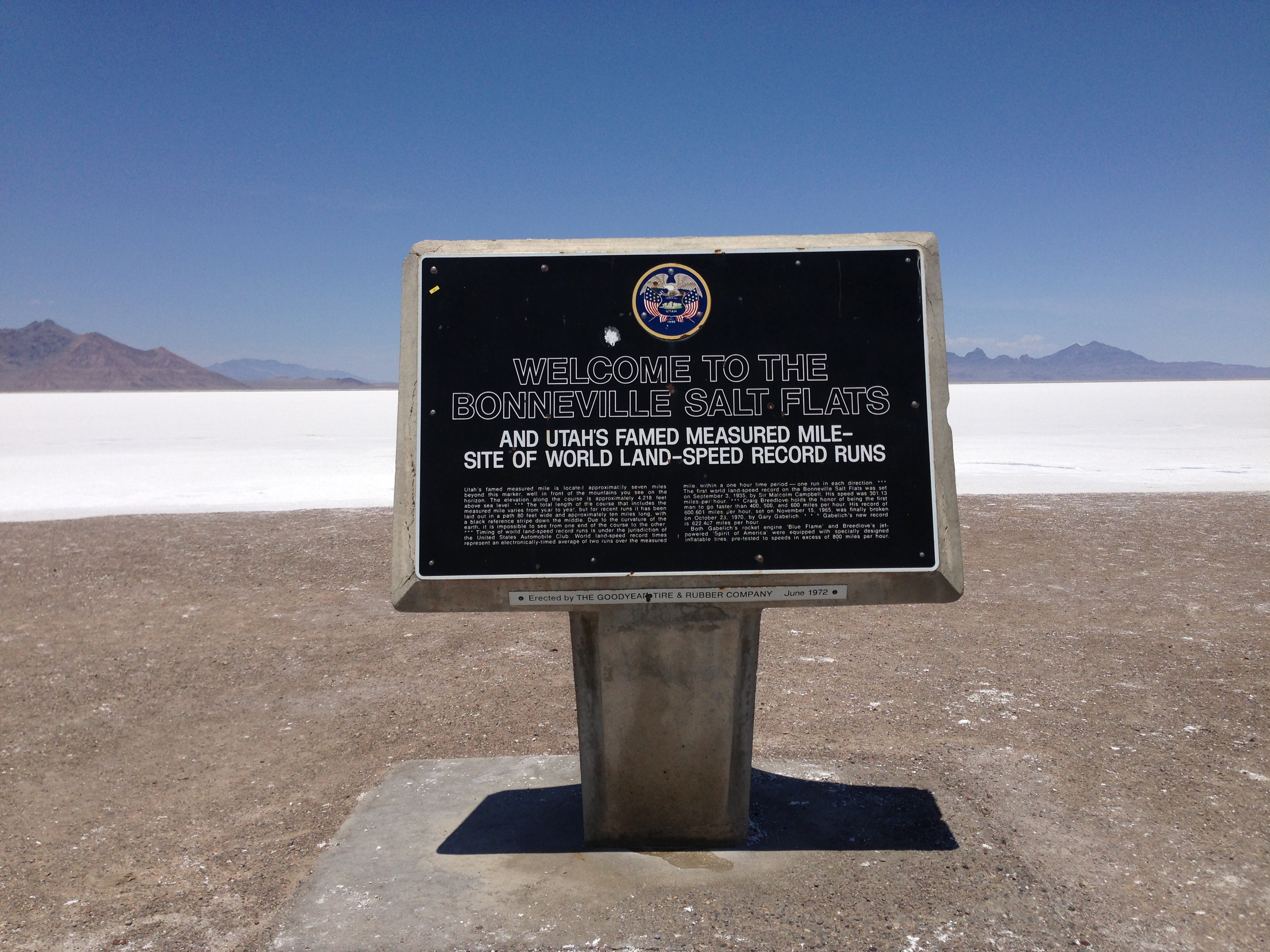
A rest area on Interstate 80 was built at the former settlement. A plaque there commemorates the land speed records set on the Bonneville Salt Flats. (July 2014)

Salt Lake City newspapers ran an advertisement in 1914 for a special train to Salduro for observers of auto races. The advertisement said the "fastest machines in the world will compete for the world's record on the famous salt beds, which afford the finest races in America. No dust." Salt Lake City mayor Samuel C. Park and Utah Governor William Spry attended.

Circa 1916, the Capell Salt Company merged into (or was transferred to) the Solvay Process Company, a potash producer. That same year, the Solvay Process Company began extracting potash from subsurface brines of the Salduro Salt Marsh. The operation was constructed on the south side of the Western Pacific Railroad at Salduro station.

On June 23, 1924, U.S. Army test pilot Russell Maughan performed the first dawn-to-dusk transcontinental flight across the United States, flying a Curtiss P-1 Hawk. One of his five refueling stops was in Salduro.

The settlement gained prominence in the 1930s and 1940s, when significant potash and salt were mined nearby.

== Decline ==
In 1944, the potash plant at Salduro closed. Shortly after, fire swept through the settlement, and it was soon abandoned.

== See also ==
- List of ghost towns in Utah
