= AT-4 =

AT-4 may refer to:

- AT4, a Swedish unguided, portable, single-shot anti-tank weapon
- AT-4 Spigot, a Soviet guided anti-tank missile
- Curtiss AT-4 Hawk, U.S. Army biplane advanced trainer of 1927
