= Fowler Airplane Corporation =

- Industry: Manufacturing
- Founded: 1918
- Founder: Robert G. Fowler
- Headquarters: San Francisco, California, United States
- Products: Aircraft

The Fowler Airplane Corporation was an aircraft manufacturing company that operated in San Francisco, California, from 1918 into the 1920s. It was founded by Robert G. Fowler, the first person to make a west-to-east transcontinental flight in stages.

== World War I ==
On 28 October 1917, the company announced it would soon purchase a parcel of land at 128 Twelfth Street and build a 50,000 square foot factory at the location. During World War I, the Fowler Aircraft Corporation, located on Howard Street in San Francisco, built Curtiss JN-4Ds for the U.S. Army Signal Corps. It was one of six companies that built the design under sub-contract. Some sources claim that the company built over 275 of the airframes, but only fifty serials in the block 2405-2454 are on record. A House of Representatives document, Report on Aircraft Surveys, dated 19 January 1920, listing all airplanes, engines, balloons and dirigibles accepted by the Air Service between 6 April 1917 and 1 November 1919, only records an order for fifty Fowler-built planes.

Some wings were built under sub-contract by the California Aviation Company of Los Angeles.

== Fire ==
On Tuesday 21 May 1918, a fire gutted the Fowler plant, as well as several frame, flat and apartment houses, as the blaze swept over a block, making 100 families homeless. The entire block between 12th and 13th Streets, and between Howard and Mission Streets, was gutted. "A double three alarm brought practically all the fire apparatus in the city." Fifteen aircraft in various stages of construction, including two completed ones that were to have been delivered that day, were destroyed as were equipment and parts enough to construct 50 airplanes. A considerable quantity of dried spruce and Irish linen were consumed by the fire. Machinery used in construction was considerably damaged. Employees estimated the value of the lost materials at between $250,000 and $1,000,000. "The total damage to the airplane factory and surrounding buildings was estimated at $750,000 by S. S. Dibbero, a director of the Fowler concern. The factory, it was said, will be rebuilt."

Another source states that the fire began in the planing mill of the L & E Emanuel Furniture Company, adjacent to the aircraft factory, and with whom Fowler had contracted for the production of parts. German sympathizers had made threats against firms supporting the American war effort, and Fowler had hired full-time security guards for the prior month. "The origin of the fire has not yet been determined, but a cursory investigation by factory officials, fire wardens and the police revealed no traces of incendiarism." "Fowler lost a fortune in linen fabric and nine completed aircraft with Hall-Scott (Liberty) engines ready for delivery to a Texas military field." However, detectives later announced that a plot by the Industrial Workers of the World was suspected.

The San Francisco Chamber of Commerce reported on 20 June 1918 that "Fowler Airplane Corp., recently burned out in the 12th St. fire, is moving to the building formerly occupied by the American Eveready Works at 755 Folsom St."

== Post-war ==
A hearing was held about the dissolution of the company on 26 March 1919. In the 26 April 1920 issue of Aerial Age Weekly, it was announced that the Interallied Aircraft Corporation, with headquarters in New York City, had just appointed the Fowler Airplane Company of 1065 Phelan Building, San Francisco, as their western agents and distributors.

The Aircraft Journal announced in its Trade News section on 17 May 1920 that the "Fowler Airplane Company announces the receipt of its first shipment of Avro airplanes to the Pacific Coast from the Interallied Aircraft Corporation, Eastern distributors. The shipment is the first arrival of any British planes on the Western Coast, and the interested are eagerly awaiting the first take off, as San Francisco being in the belt of all year round flying, the demand for airplanes for personal use is beginning to be felt. The Avros will fly from the Marina at the water-front, and plans are being made for installing a complete service organization and sales force throughout every city of any size or importance in the state of California. The Fowler Airplane Company predicts a tremendous advance in the use of airplanes for commercial purposes within the coming year."

Aerial Age Weekly reported in its "The Aircraft Trade Review" section, on 26 April 1920, that "R. G. 'Bob' Fowler and W. H. Jones of the Fowler Airplane Company are placing the machines on exhibition at the Palace Hotel as well as at the Aeronautical Show at the Civic Auditorium." These were Avro 504Ks. The item adds that "One of the first inquiries to be received was from the city and county of San Francisco for a plane to be used on the city's water project at Hetch Hetchy in the High Sierras. Through the use of the aeroplane the men there can be paid off in a quarter of the time it used to take."

The Interallied Aircraft Corporation plans to import numerous British former military aircraft into the United States for sale and use was abruptly halted by a District Court ruling, on 9 July 1920, in a lawsuit brought by Wright Aeronautical. The Chicago Daily Tribune reported:

The plan of British Interests to flood this country with thousands of British war planes at practically junk prices appears to be defeated by a decision handed down by Judge Thomas I. Chatfield In the United States District Court, Brooklyn. Curiously enough, the decree which may save the American manufacturers from ruin and the air service for dependence on foreign airplanes was based upon the fact that the airplane in its present form is strictly an American invention. The decree was obtained by the Wright Aeronautical company of Paterson, N.J., holder of the patent rights of Orville and Wilbur Wright, and perpetually prohibits the Interallied Aircraft corporation [sic] of New York from using or selling foreign airplanes in this country. Col. William Bishop is head of this organization.

In the 14 March 1921 issue of Aviation and Aircraft Journal, the Lawrence Sperry Aircraft Company, Inc. advertised that they were now the dealers for Avro aircraft, parenthetically noting "formerly sold by the Interallied Aircraft Corp." As Billy Bishop and fellow ace William Barker had apparently dissolved their partnership by this time, it is probable that the Fowler Aircraft Company was forced out of business at this same time.
