= Panama and the Canal from an Aeroplane =

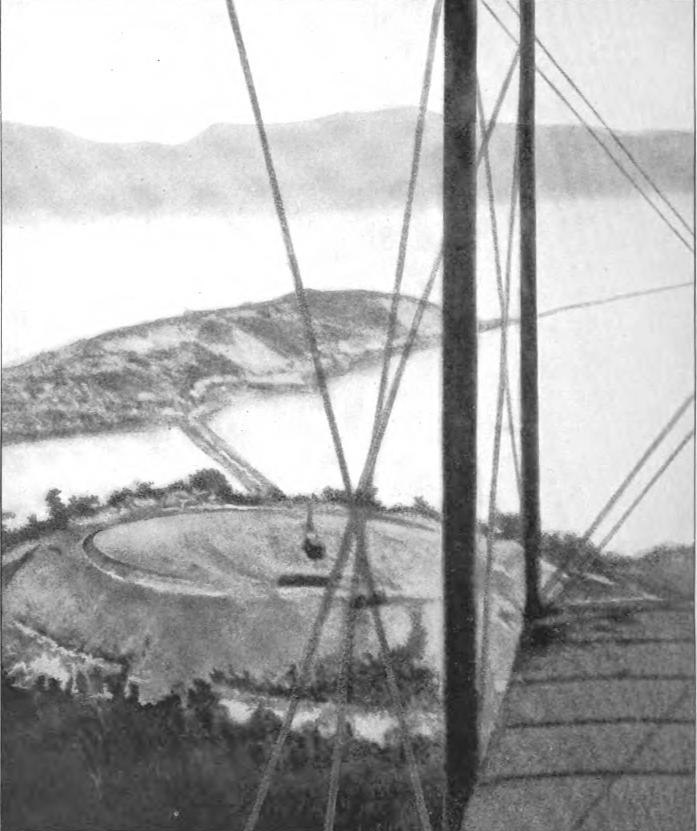
- still of the Canal as seen from the Fowler plane published in Sunset Magazine.
- Directed by: Robert G. Fowler
- Written by: Riley A. Scott; Charles K. Field
- Produced by: Duhem Motion Picture Company; George F. Cosby; M. B. Dudley
- Starring: Robert G. Fowler
- Cinematography: Raymond Andre Duhem
- Release date: 1914
- Running time: 6 parts
- Country: United States
- Language: Silent..English titles

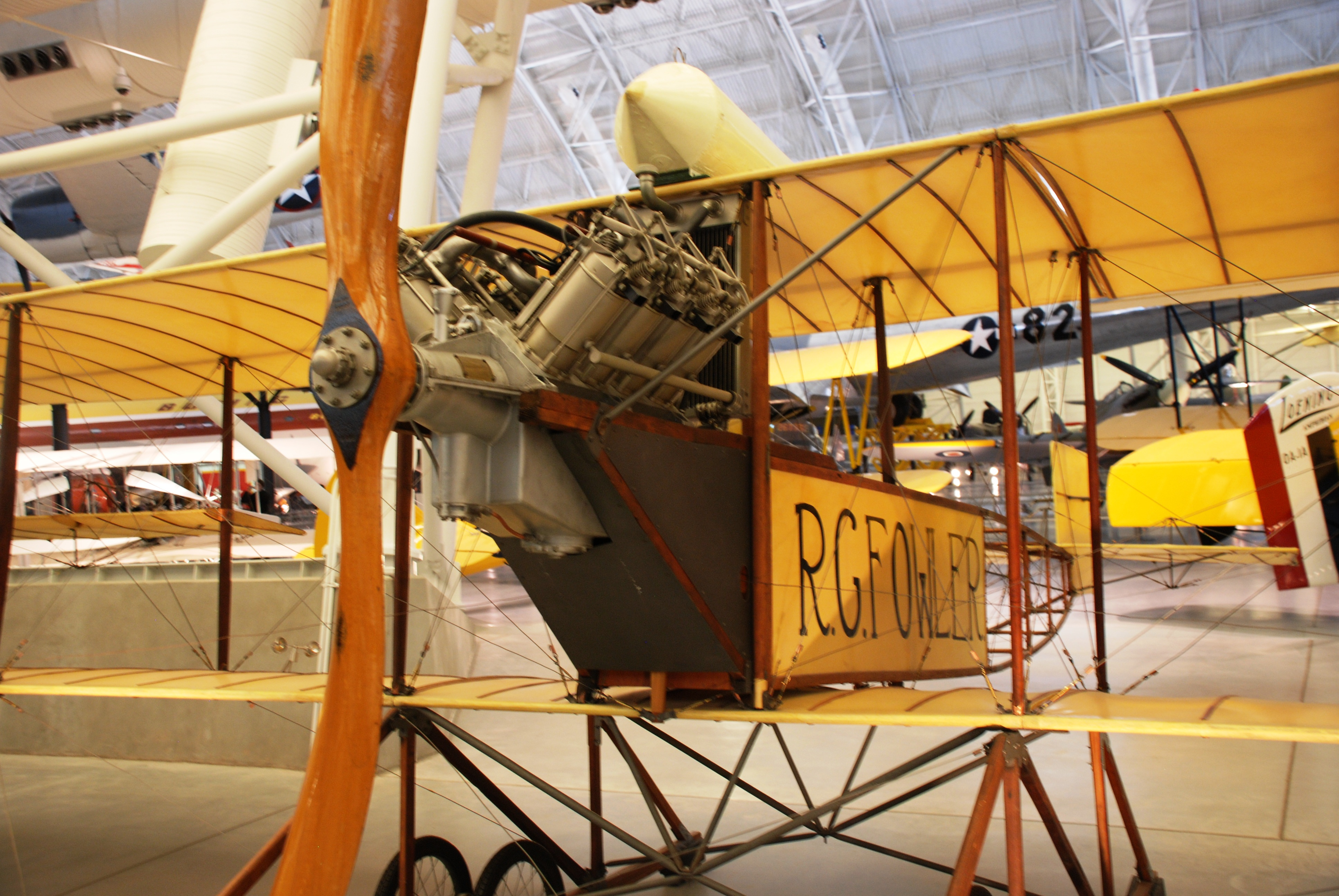
Gage biplane used for the pioneering flight, preserved at the Smithsonian's Udvar-Hazy facility

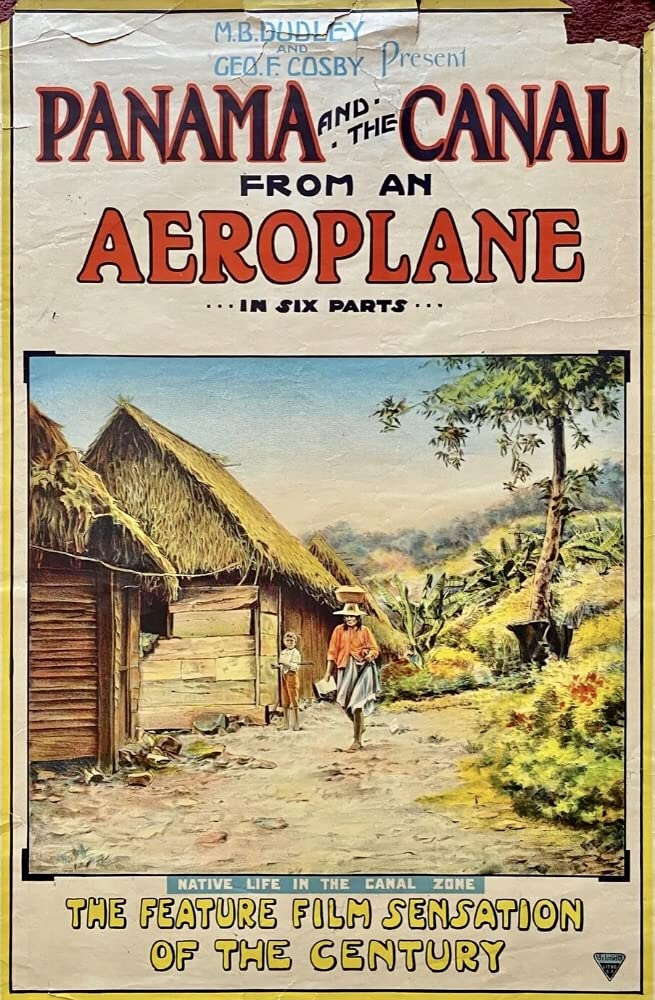
Movie poster

Panama and the Canal from an Aeroplane is a 1914 silent actuality film taken by pilot Robert G. Fowler and cameraman Ray Duhem on April 27, 1913. Fowler was making the first nonstop trans-Panama flight, Pacific-to-Atlantic, in an aeroplane and took along Duhem and his film camera. They flew over the still uncompleted Panama Canal and filmed scenes that later got them in trouble with the Department of War because they showed military fortifications in construction.

== Cast ==
- Robert G. Fowler
- Ray Duhem
