= Dawn-to-dusk transcontinental flight across the United States =

1924 pioneering flight

The "Dawn to dusk" transcontinental flight across the United States was a pioneering aviation record established on June 23, 1924. It marked the first crossing of the North American continent within the hours of daylight.

The record was set by 1st Lt. Russell L. Maughan, a U.S. Army Air Service test pilot at McCook Field, Dayton, Ohio, the site of the Air Service Engineering Division and its major flight-test center.

== Concept and flight plan ==
The flight plan was conceived by the Air Service's Assistant Chief, Brig. Gen. Billy Mitchell in 1923. Since 1919, the Air Service had regularly established endurance, distance, altitude, and speed records in airplanes to promote favorable publicity and public support for the funding of the U.S. Army War Department's Major Project Number 4, the Lassiter plan for the expansion of the Air Service. The year before, Lt. James H. Doolittle had flown a DH-4 from Florida to San Diego in a single calendar day, making just one stop in Texas for fuel. Mitchell wanted not only to improve on both the time and distance involved, but to have the stunt highly publicized by having it take off and land during daylight at major urban centers. The military purpose of the flight would be to demonstrate the utility of rapidly moving air units from one side of the nation to the other, a capability that the Army and Navy did not possess.

The original calculations for the flight were that, in early summer, including twilight, 20 hours of daylight were available for a westbound flight. By averaging 160 miles (260 km) an hour, the distance of 2,670 miles (4,300 km) from New York to San Francisco could be covered in 16 hours and 40 minutes. Mitchell had struck a deal with Curtiss Aircraft to purchase 25 new PW-8 fighters, patterned after the R-6 Racer, if Curtiss would help modify one of the project's prototypes. The D-12 engine on the PW-8 produced 435 horsepower (324 kW), and Mitchell's intended modifications were to enable it to make the flight at full throttle power setting. If the armament and unnecessary equipment were removed from the XPW-8, additional fuel capacity could be installed to extend its range, and larger oil tanks could be added for engine cooling. The flight plan included four 30-minute refueling stops. McCook Field, Ohio; Saint Joseph, Missouri; Cheyenne, Wyoming; and remote Salduro Siding, Utah, were selected as refueling points, following a recently established mail route.

Maughan was chosen to make the flight because he was an experienced test pilot and a combat veteran accustomed to dealing with in-flight emergencies, and because he had already established speed records in 1922 and 1923 in the R-6.

== The first two attempts to set the record ==
The first attempt to establish the record was flown on July 10, 1923. Maughan took off from Mitchel Field, Long Island, at 4:56 a.m. The Allegheny Mountains were obscured by a thick undercast, and unable to navigate by landmarks, Maughan flew by dead reckoning, arriving at McCook Field 90 minutes behind schedule, where a broken tail fin rib caused an additional delay. The engine of the PW-8 quit in flight over Illinois because of a clogged fuel line, and Maughan made a forced landing in a farm field, damaging the landing gear and ending the attempt.

The second attempt to set the record was made on July 19. After a 5:08 a.m. takeoff, Maughan completed the 570-mile (920 km) first leg to McCook Field at 8:35 a.m, taking off again at 8:53 a.m. After reaching Saint Joseph, where he spent 39 minutes on the ground, Maughan experienced severe nausea from oil fumes on the next leg. He reached Cheyenne, however, where a broken oil line was found and soldered together. Approximately 90 minutes after leaving Cheyenne, the oil line ruptured again, and the nausea forced him to land at the air mail field at Rock Springs, Wyoming.

The first two attempts indicated that maximum performance was stressing the PW-8 engine, necessitating additional time to be factored into the flight plan. With available daylight already reduced by a half-hour by the date of the second attempt, no further tries were made in 1923.

== Setting the record ==
The next attempt was made using a different plane, serial number 24-204, the fourth PW-8 production aircraft. Curtiss modified it at its Long Island plant, removing its guns and mounts and increasing the 77-gallon fuel capacity by an additional 100 gallons. Maughan rose before dawn and ate breakfast at the Mitchel Field Officer's Open Mess: scrambled eggs, bacon, and toast, plus a slice of cantaloupe he found in the club's refrigerator. He also procured a copy of the June 22 New York Times to deliver personally to the mayor of San Francisco, James Rolph.

Maughan took off from Mitchel Field at 3:58 a.m. Eastern Standard Time, June 23, 1924. He flew through intermittent rain and fog but still averaged 135 mph (217 km/h) and reached McCook Field in Dayton, Ohio, at 8:10 a.m. EST. Although mechanics serviced the plane in about twenty minutes, one of the field's mechanics over-torqued the filler cap while securing it to the fuel intake housing, and broke off the valve. The housing had to be removed, soldered, and replaced, causing an hour's delay.

Maughan encountered thunderstorms between Dayton and St. Joseph, but reached Saint Joseph without incident. The grass field there was soft from heavy rain, limiting the takeoff weight of his plane. Unable to take on a full load of fuel, Maughan flew to North Platte, Nebraska, where he completely filled the fuel tank, causing a further 20-minute delay.

The detour to North Platte also resulted in Maughan encountering a strong headwind, slowing his average groundspeed. He landed at the air mail field at Salduro Siding, a railroad stop adjacent to the Bonneville Salt Flats, at almost 6:30 p.m. local time and calculated that reaching San Francisco by dusk was still possible.

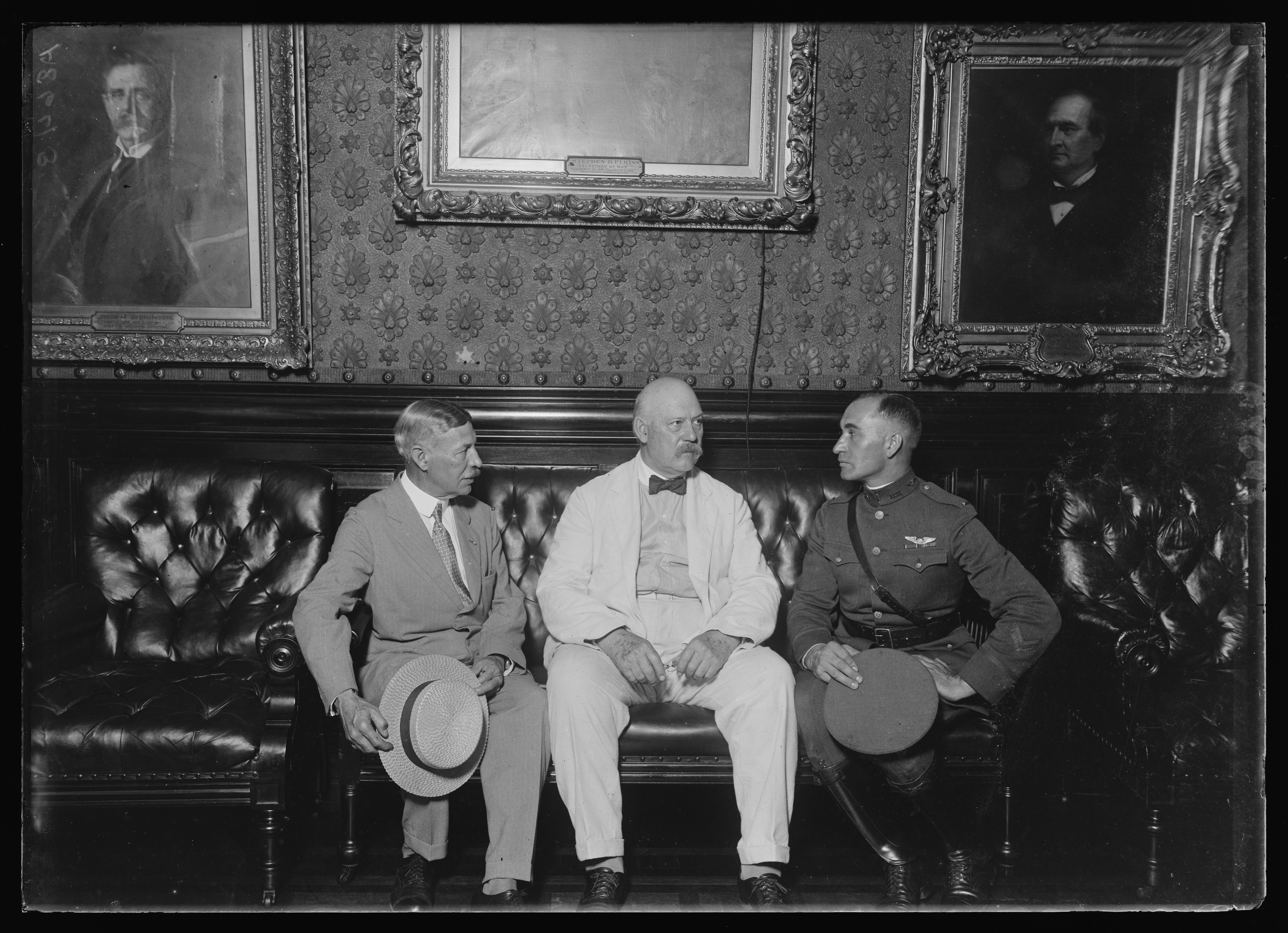
Lt. Russell L. Manghan telling Chief of Air Service Mason Patrick and Secretary of War John W. Weeks about his successful "dawn to dusk" flight.

The last leg of the flight, over Nevada and the Sierra Nevada range, was characterized by cloud strata, making navigation difficult in low-light conditions. Maughan, from Logan, Utah, was familiar with the terrain, however, and recognized sufficient landmarks to approach San Francisco Bay from the north. He used a revolving light on Alcatraz Island to guide him to Crissy Field, the military airfield at the Presidio of San Francisco, where he landed in front of an estimated 50,000 spectators at 9:46 p.m. Pacific Standard Time, reportedly a minute before dusk.

Maughan's total transit time was 20 hours and 48 minutes. His actual flight time was 18 hours and 20 minutes, at an average groundspeed of 156 mph (251 km/h). In addition to the publicity value of being the first transcontinental crossing within the hours of daylight, the flight established new records for time, distance, and average speed (128.37 mph) in transcontinental flights.

Maughan's record was not eclipsed until August 20, 1928 when Hollywood stunt flier Arthur C. Goebel, in what was the first nonstop flight across the continent from west to east, flew from Los Angeles, California to Curtiss Field, New York in the Lockheed Vega Yankee Doodle (NX4789), in 18 hours and 58 minutes, averaging 142 mph (229 km/h).
