= Charles K. Field =

American journalist and poet

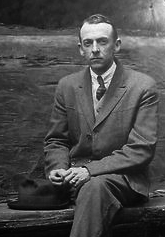

Charles Kellogg Field (September 4, 1873, in Montpelier, Vermont– 1948) was an American journalist and poet.

He served as editor of Sunset from about 1914 to 1920, after buying the magazine from the Southern Pacific Railroad along with his colleagues. He was a member of the pioneer class of Stanford University in 1895.

In 1914, Field was indicted under the Defense Secrets Act of 1911 for publishing photographs of the Panama Canal, then under construction, and its fortifications, along with an article by Lieutenant Riley Scott suggesting that the canal was vulnerable to an attack by air.

From 1927 to 1940 Field hosted a radio program on NBC called Cheerio. He also adopted this as a pseudonym, writing The Story of Cheerio, by Himself in 1936.

== See also ==
- Robert G. Fowler, pilot of Panama flight
- John W. Preston, prosecutor of Panama Canal case
- The Panama and the Canal from an Aeroplane (1914)
