= Fokker D.XII =

Dutch single-seat fighter aircraft

D.XII
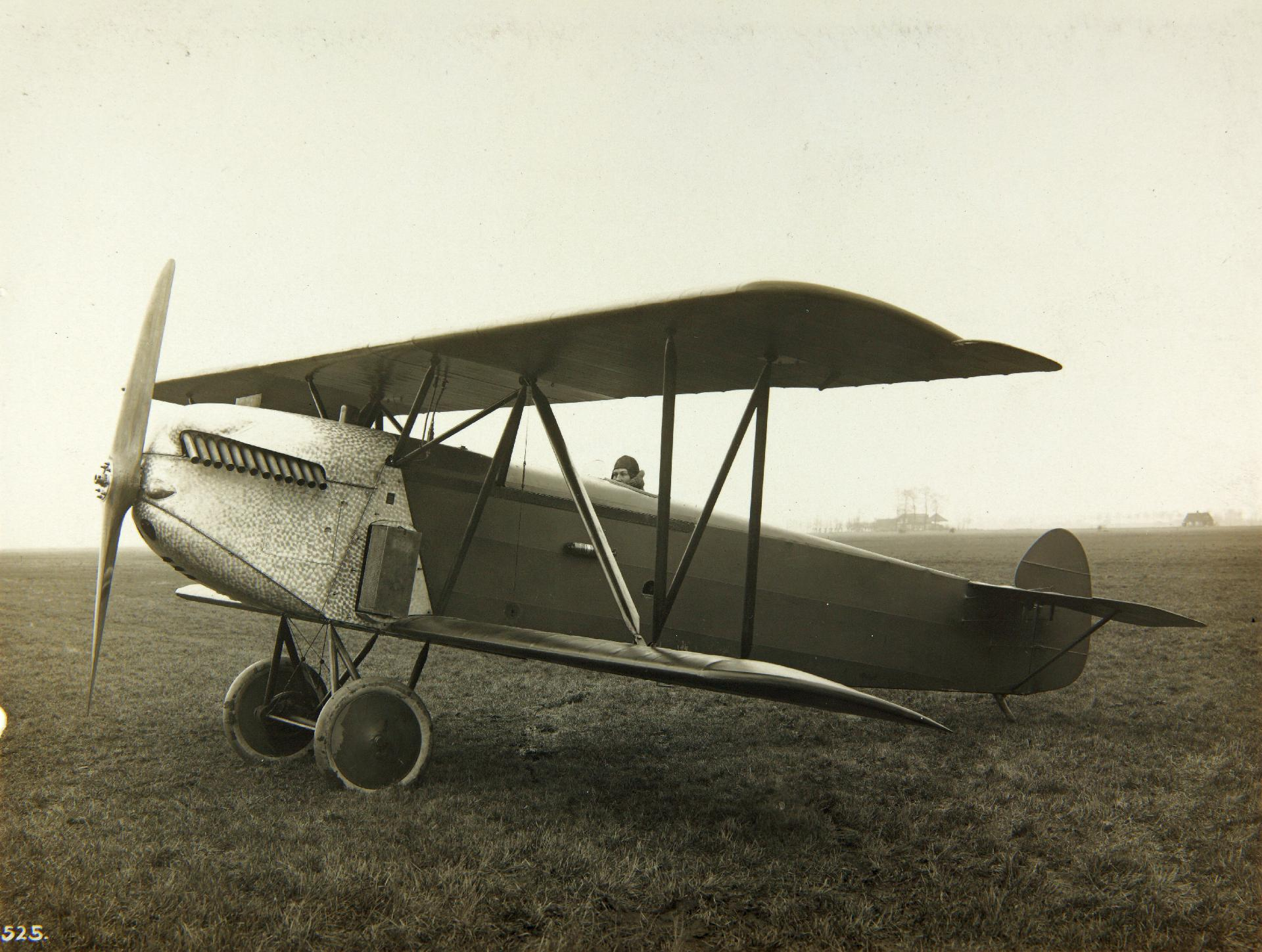

General information
- Type: Single seat fighter aircraft
- National origin: Netherlands
- Manufacturer: Fokker-Flugzeugwerke
- Number built: 3

History
- First flight: with Curtiss engine 21 August 1924

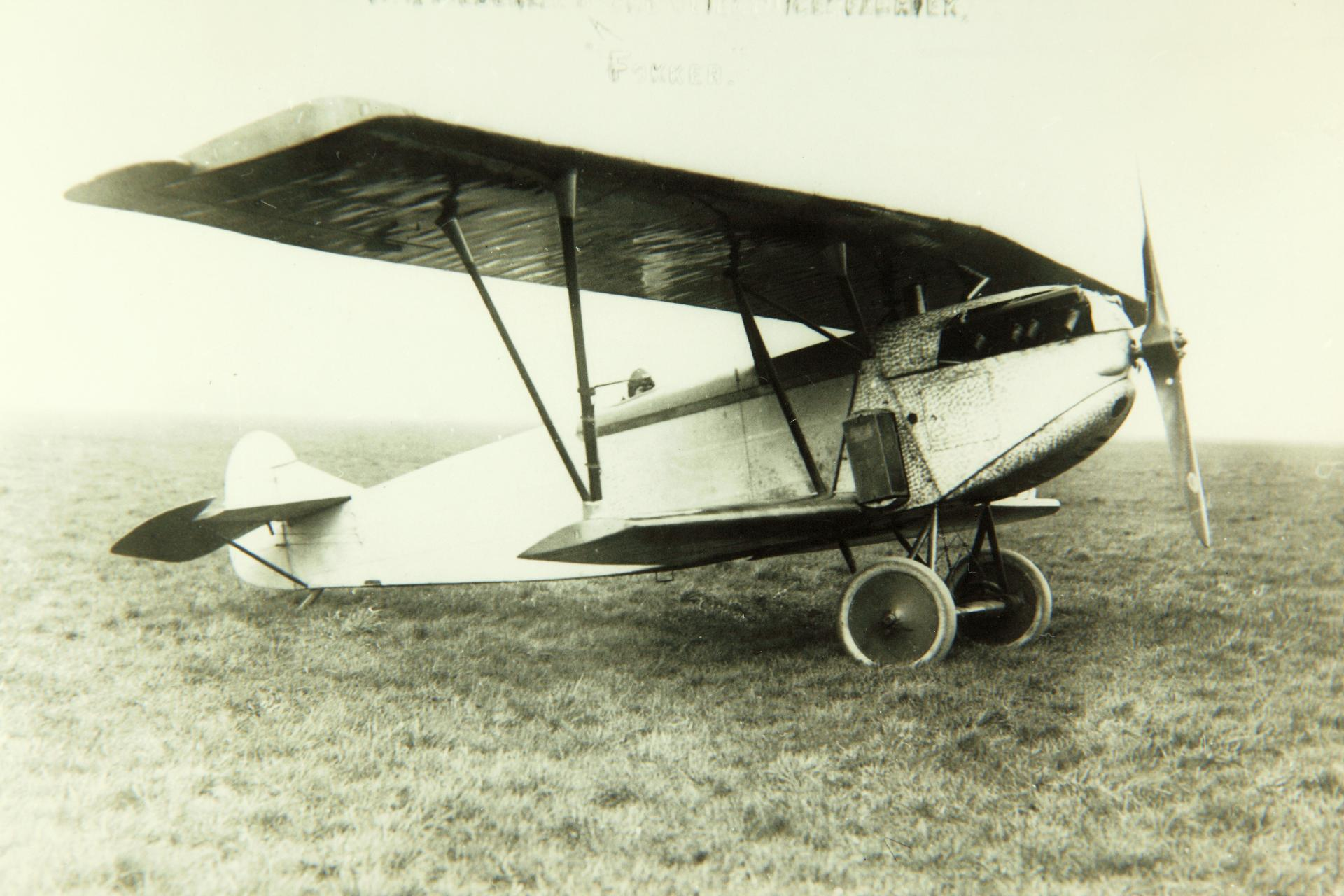
Early Fokker D.XII with Vee struts

The Fokker D.XII was a Dutch single seat, single engine fighter aircraft designed to an American specification which called for the use of a Curtiss D-12 engine, designated PW-7. Despite considerable efforts to improve the airframe, Fokker failed to win the USAAS competition.

== Design and development ==
The D.XII owed its existence to the Fokker D.XI, even though they had no design overlap; the connection was that the earlier aircraft had some success when submitted to the USAAS's call for entrants in its PW-7 specification competition, an order for three resulting. The D.XII was intended from the start to meet this specification and was designed around the required Curtiss D-12 engine.

Initially, the D.XII was, like the D.XI, a single bay sesquiplane but its wings were different in plan and construction. The upper wing was straight edged with some sweep on the leading edge, it had a thinner aerofoil section than that of its predecessor and was fabric rather than plywood covered. Overhung ailerons were used, their ends projecting outboard of the squared wing tips proper, acting as aerodynamic balances. The lower wing, which lacked ailerons, was both much shorter in span and smaller in chord. The early D.XII had a V-form interplane strut on each side; another strut leant out from each wing root to the upper rear spar, assisted ahead of it on each side by a short V-form pair linking the two spars to the upper fuselage longeron, acting as N-form cabane struts.

The fuselage of the D.XII was flat sided and deep from nose to tail. Initially it had the same 300 hp (224 kW) Hispano-Suiza 8F V-eight engine as its predecessor, but this was soon replaced by the USAAS-specified 440 hp (328 kW) V-twelve water-cooled Curtiss D-12. Both were enclosed by a metal cowlings, though of slightly different shapes, and drove a two blade propeller. The single, open cockpit was well to the rear of the wing, about midway down the fuselage. Its horizontal tail was braced and the fin was small, carrying a balanced rudder that extended down to the keel. The D.XII had a fixed conventional undercarriage of the single axle type, supported by V struts. There was a small tail skid.

The first flight under Curtiss power was made on 21 August 1924. Flight testing followed, resulting in major modifications. The upper wing was given an unswept leading edge and hence had constant chord and the small lower wing was replaced by one with the same chord as the upper plane and a span almost its equal, mounted with marked stagger. No longer a sesquiplane, the splayed V interplane struts were swapped for more rigid N-form replacements. Another bracing strut ran from the forward foot of the interplane strut to the top of the root to upper wing inner strut, to further improve torsional strength. At the rear, the little fin was remove and the rudder, still balanced, reshaped. Two more aircraft with these modifications were built.

Despite Fokker's efforts, the aircraft was still not to the liking of the USAAS who did not buy any of the three D.XIIs; further development was abandoned.

== Specifications (Curtiss D-12 engine) ==
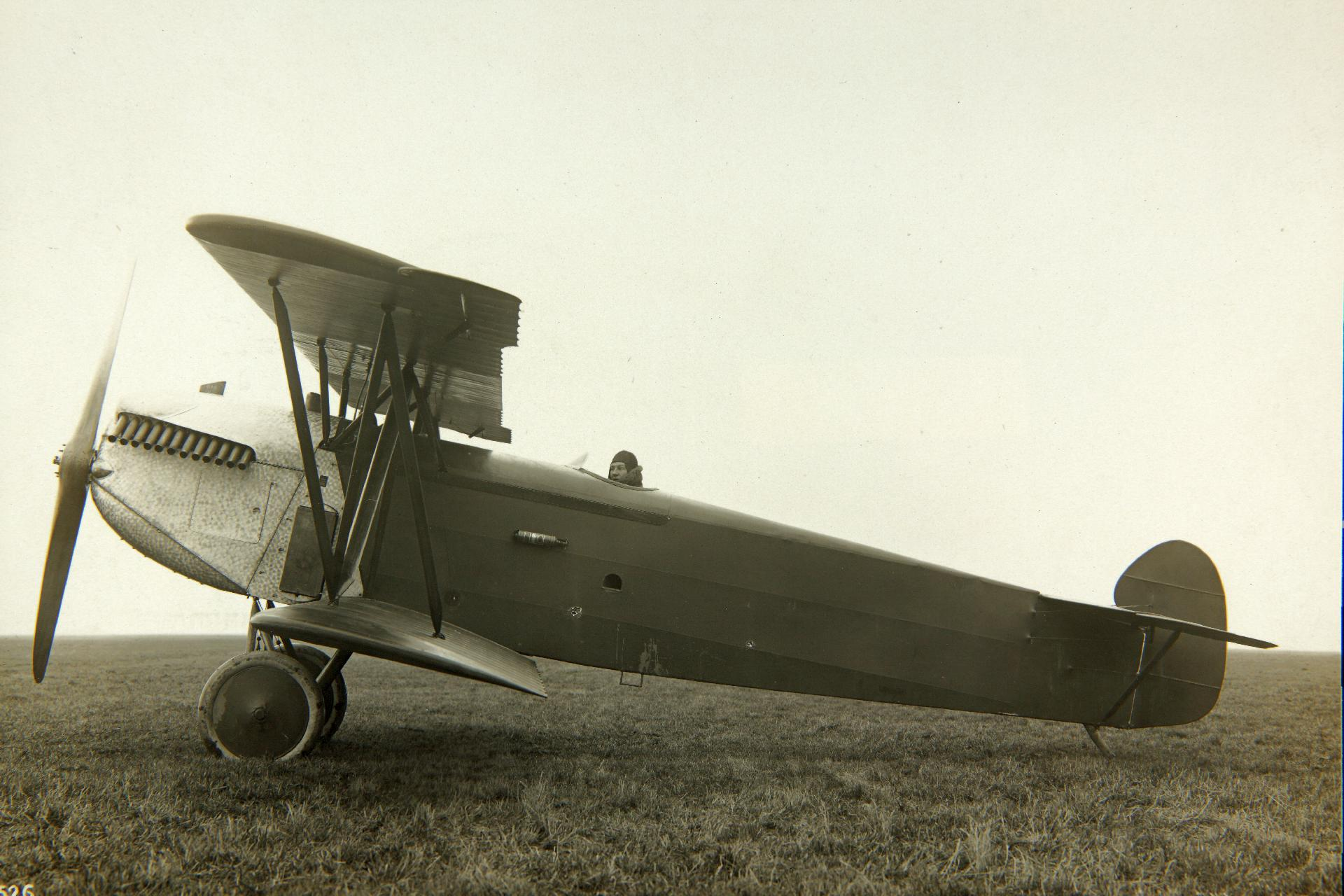
Fokker D.XII side

Data from Green and Swanborough 1994

General characteristics

- Crew: One
- Length: 6.74 m (22 ft 1 in)
- Wingspan: 11.00 m (36 ft 1 in)
- Height: 2.77 m (9 ft 1 in)
- Wing area: 21.83 m^{2} (235.0 sq ft)
- Empty weight: 998 kg (2,200 lb)
- Gross weight: 1,400 kg (3,086 lb)
- Powerplant: 1 × Curtiss D-12 water-cooled V-12, 330 kW (440 hp)
- Propellers: 2-bladed

Performance

- Maximum speed: 250 km/h (160 mph, 130 kn)
- Cruise speed: 220 km/h (140 mph, 120 kn)
- Range: 1,100 km (680 mi, 590 nmi)
