= Curtiss D-12 =

V12 aircraft engine

D-12/Felix
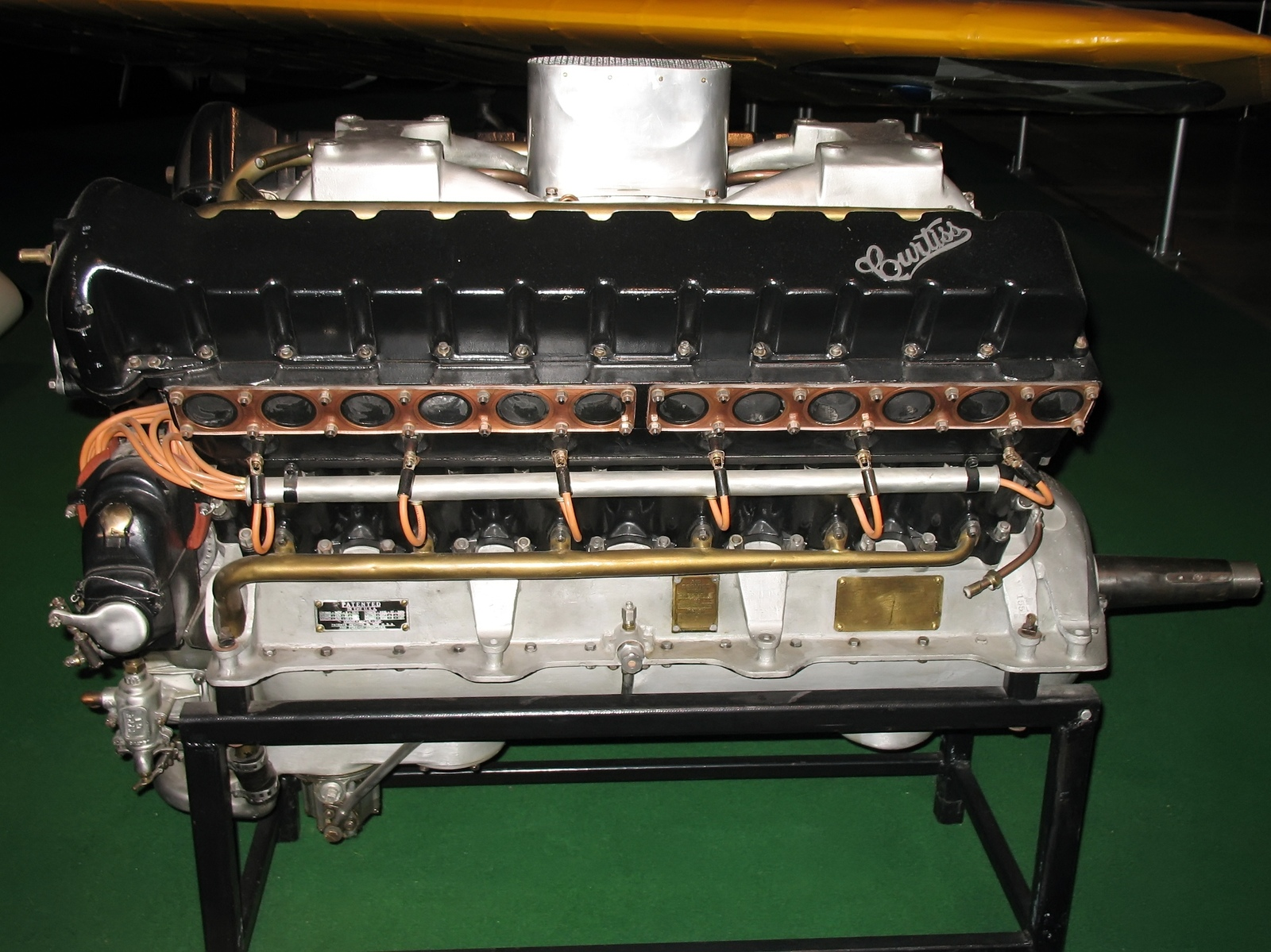
- Preserved D-12 engine
- Type: V12 piston engine
- Manufacturer: Curtiss Aeroplane and Motor Company
- First run: 1923
- Developed from: Curtiss K-12
- Developed into: Curtiss V-1570 Conqueror

The Curtiss D-12, sometimes identified with the military designation Curtiss V-1150, was an aircraft engine of 18.8 liter displacement. It was a water-cooled V12, producing 443 hp (330 kW) and weighing 693 lb (314 kg). It was designed by Arthur Nutt in 1921 and used in the Curtiss CR-3 for the 1923 Schneider Trophy race. Fairey Aviation of England imported 50 Curtiss-built examples in 1926, renaming them the Fairey Felix.

The D-12 was one of the first truly successful aluminum cast-block engines and was extremely influential in the interwar period. Numerous engines trace their design to the D-12, among them the Packard 1A-1500, Rolls-Royce Kestrel and Junkers Jumo 210.

== Applications ==
=== D-12 ===
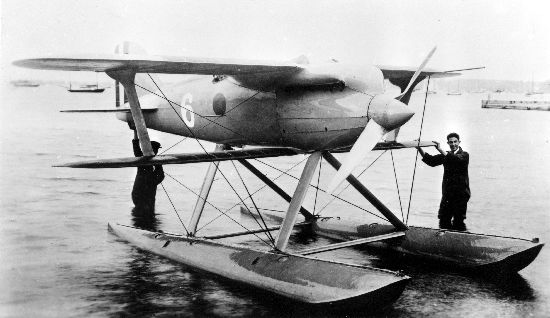
Curtiss R2C

- Boeing Model 15
- Curtiss CR
- Curtiss Falcon
- Curtiss P-5
- Curtiss PW-8
- Curtiss R2C
- Fokker D.XII
- Macchi M.33
- Wittman D-12 Bonzo

=== Felix ===
- Fairey Firefly I
- Fairey Fox

== Specifications (Curtiss D-12/Felix) ==
Data from Lumsden.

=== General characteristics ===
- Type: Liquid-cooled 60-degree V12
- Bore: 4.5 in (114.3 mm)
- Stroke: 6.0 in (152.4 mm)
- Displacement: 1,145 cu in (18.8 L)
- Length: 56.75 in (1441 mm)
- Width: 28.25 in (717.5 mm)
- Height: 34.75 in (882.6 mm)
- Dry weight: 693 lb (314 kg)

=== Components ===
- Cooling system: Liquid-cooled

=== Performance ===
- Power output: 443 hp (330 kW) at 2,200 rpm
- Compression ratio: 6:1

== See also ==
Comparable engines

- Packard 1A-1500
- Rolls-Royce Kestrel

Related lists

- List of aircraft engines
