= Curtiss CR =

Racing aircraft designed of United States Navy

Model 23, CR, R-6
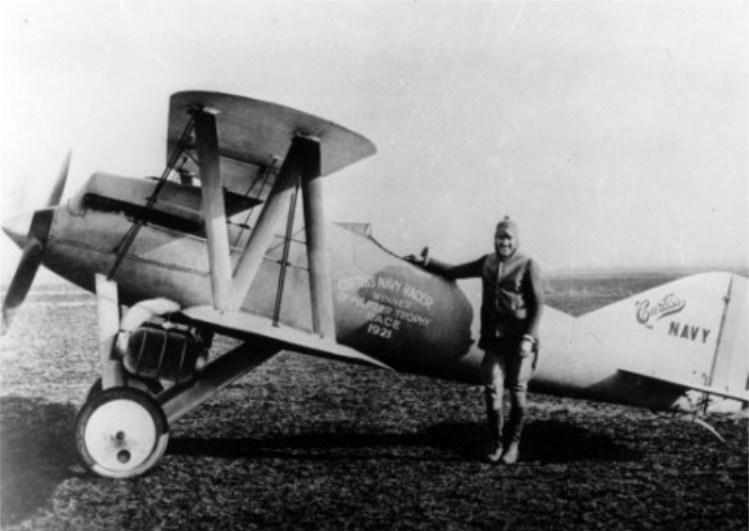
- The CR-1 with Bert Acosta, 1921

General information
- Type: Racing aircraft
- Manufacturer: Curtiss Aeroplane and Motor Company
- Primary user: United States Navy
- Number built: 4

History
- First flight: 1 August 1921

The Curtiss CR was a racing aircraft designed for the United States Navy in 1921 by Curtiss. It was a conventional single-seater biplane with a monocoque fuselage and staggered single-bay wings of equal span braced with N-struts. Two essentially similar landplane versions were built as the CR-1 and CR-2, which were both eventually converted to seaplanes as the CR-3 in 1923 and CR-4 in 1924. A refined version was developed for the US Army Air Service under the designation R-6. These latter two aircraft featured refined aerodynamics included surface-mounted radiators.

== Operational history ==
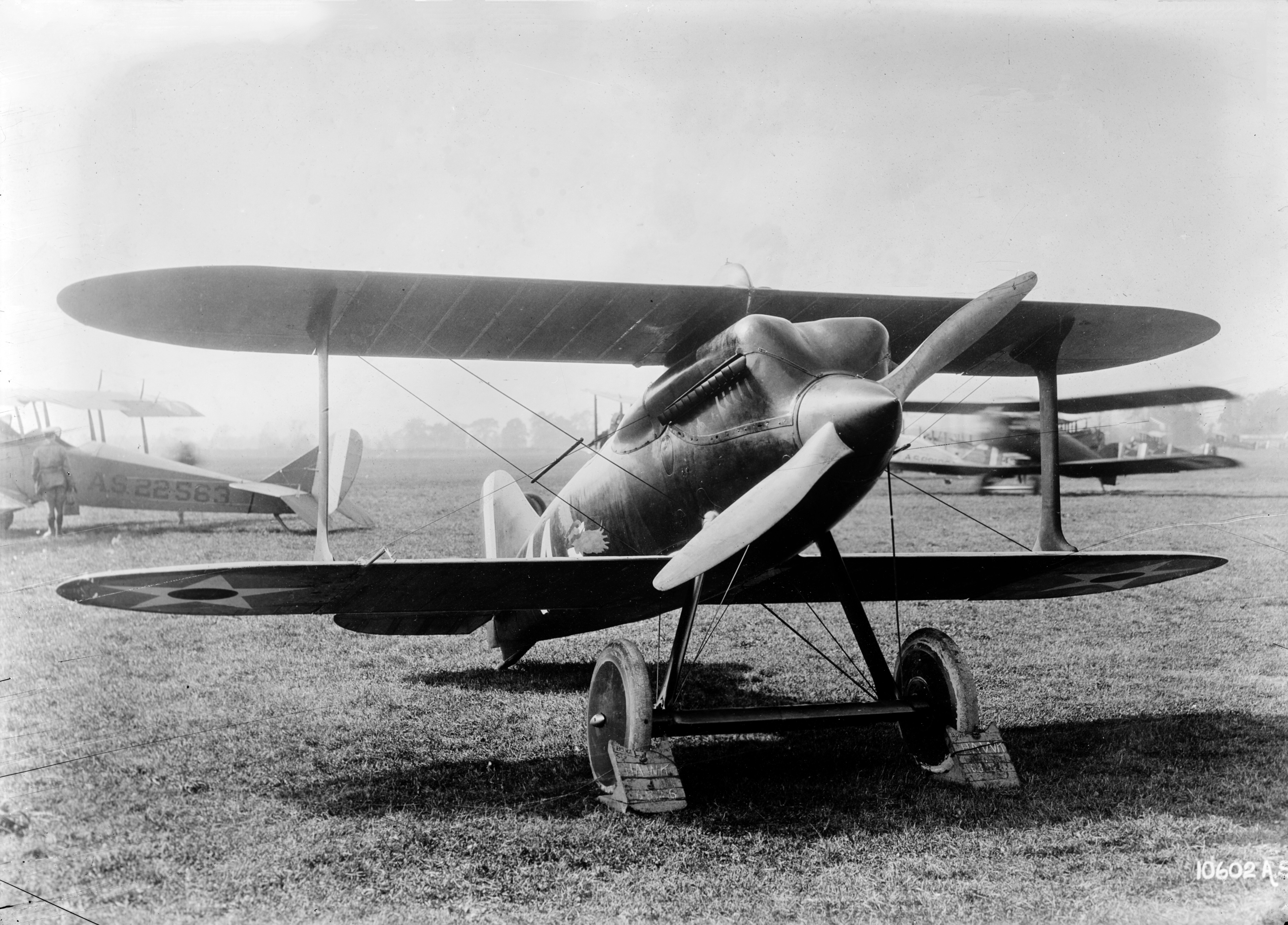
An Army Curtiss R-6, which won the 1922 Pulitzer Trophy with an average speed of 330 km/h.

The Curtiss CRs enjoyed successful racing careers. Their first major win was at the 1921 Pulitzer Trophy race, where piloted by Bert Acosta the CR-1 took first place with an average speed of 176.75 mph (283.49 km/h), nearly two minutes ahead of its closest rival. The following year, this aircraft was modified and redesignated CR-2 and joined in the Pulitzer race by a second aircraft built to the same new standard, plus two R-6s flown by Army pilots. These Curtiss aircraft took first through fourth place, the two R-6s followed by the two CR-2s. The race was won by Lt. Russell Maughan with an average speed of 205.856 mph (330.172 km/h) with Lt. Lester Maitland in second place (198.850 mph/318.936 km/h). Maughan's effort incidentally broke every closed-circuit airspeed record up to 124 mi (200 km). The CR-2s took third and fourth places piloted by Lt Harold Brow (average speed 193.695 mph/310.667 km/h) and Lt Jg Al Williams (average speed 187.996 mph/301.527 km/h).

The Army built upon this success with the R-6s by using the aircraft to break the world airspeed record before 1922 was over, Gen Billy Mitchell flying one to 224.28 mph (359.72 km/h) on 18 October. In March the following year, an R-6 flown by Lt. Maughan lifted the record to 236.587 mph (380.74 km/h). The R-6 design was developed in 1923 into the longer-winged XPW-8, the prototype of the PW-8 fighter.

In 1923, the CR-2s were fitted with floats for the Schneider Trophy race and redesignated CR-3. The aircraft took first and second place, piloted by David Rittenhouse (average speed 177.977 mph (154.658 kn; 286.426 km/h) and Rutledge Irvine 173.932 mph (151.143 kn; 279.916 km/h). After the 1924 Schneider Trophy race was cancelled, CR-3 A6081 was flown by Lt. G.T. Cuuddihy to set up new World's closed-course seaplane record oc 188.07 mph (163.43 kn; 302.67 km/h).

A6081 was further modified as the CR-4 for use as a test-bed and trainer for the 1926 Schneider Trophy racing team.

== Variants ==
CR-1
the first CR with US Navy serial A6080, with Lamblin radiators between the undercarriage struts.
CR-2
the second CR A6081, fitted with streamlined wheels and wing surface radiators.
CR-3
both A6080 and A6081 were converted to CR-3 standard with floats and 475 hp (354 kW) Curtis D-12 5PL engines.
CR-4
CR-3 A6081, modified as a test-bed and trainer for the 1926 Schneider Trophy race team.

== Operators ==
United States

- United States Navy (CR)
- United States Army (R6)

== Specifications (CR-3 Seaplane) ==
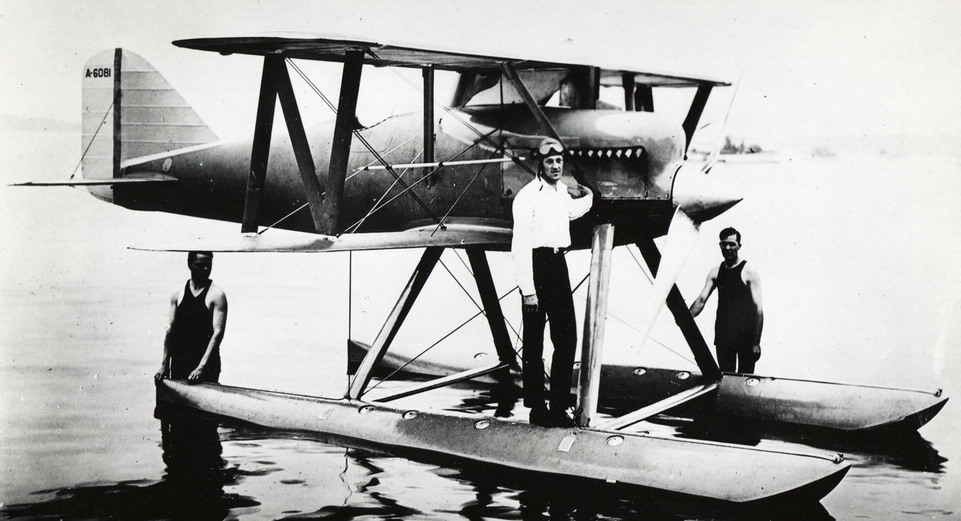
LT David Rittenhouse (center) Cowes, England September 1923.

Data from Curtiss Aircraft 1907–1947

General characteristics

- Crew: 1
- Length: 25 ft 0.375 in (7.62953 m)
- Wingspan: 22 ft 8 in (6.91 m)
- Height: 10 ft 9 in (3.28 m)
- Wing area: 168 sq ft (15.6 m^{2})
- Airfoil: Sloane
- Empty weight: 2,119 lb (961 kg)
- Gross weight: 2,746 lb (1,246 kg)
- Powerplant: 1 × Curtiss D-12 5PL V-12 water-cooled piston engine, 475 hp (354 kW) at 2,300 rpm
- Propellers: 2-bladed Curtiss-Reed

Performance

- Maximum speed: 194 mph (312 km/h, 169 kn)
- Range: 281 mi (452 km, 244 nmi) at full throttle
- Service ceiling: 22,000 ft (6,700 m)

Armament

- Guns: 2 × fixed .30 in (7.62 mm) machine guns

== See also ==
Related development

- Curtiss R3C

Aircraft of comparable role, configuration, and era

- Gallaudet D-4
