= Robert G. Fowler =

American aviator

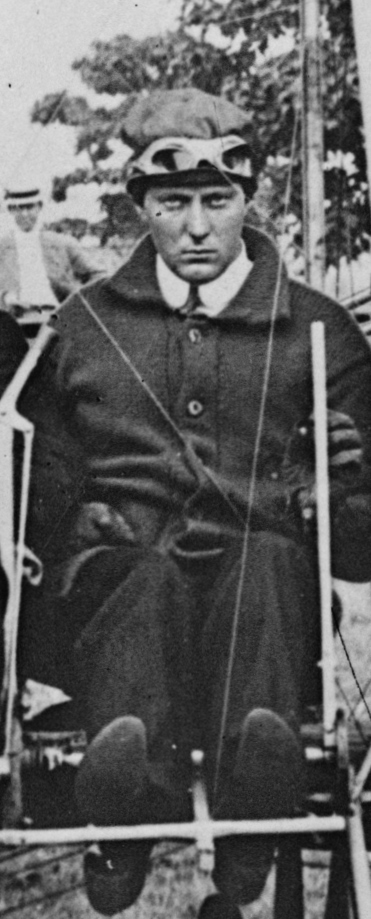
- Fowler with the Wright Model B Flyer called the "Cole Flyer" 1911
- Born: August 10, 1884; San Francisco, California
- Died: June 15, 1966 (aged 81); San Jose, California

Robert George Fowler (August 10, 1884 – June 15, 1966) was an early aviation pioneer and was the first person to make a west-to-east transcontinental flight in North America in stages.

== Biography ==
He was born on August 10, 1884, in San Francisco, California. He married Leonore in 1913. She had been previously married.

=== Hearst prize ===
He left San Francisco, California, on September 11, 1911, in an attempt to win the $50,000 (approximately $1,687,000 today) Hearst prize in a Wright biplane equipped with a Cole Motor Car Company engine. After his first day he crashed in Alta, California. His cross-country flight was completed February 8, 1912, in Jacksonville, Florida, after the deadline, and the prize expired without a winner.

=== Panama Canal ===
After becoming the first person to traverse the United States from the West Coast to the East Coast, Fowler became the first person to make a nonstop transcontinental flight by traversing the Isthmus of Panama in an hour and thirty-five minutes on 27 April 1913. Flying from the Pacific to the Atlantic along the route of the Panama Canal construction in a single-engine hydroplane, his passenger and cameraman Ray Duhem filmed parts of the canal during the flight. The film when released was eventually called The Panama and the Canal from an Aeroplane.

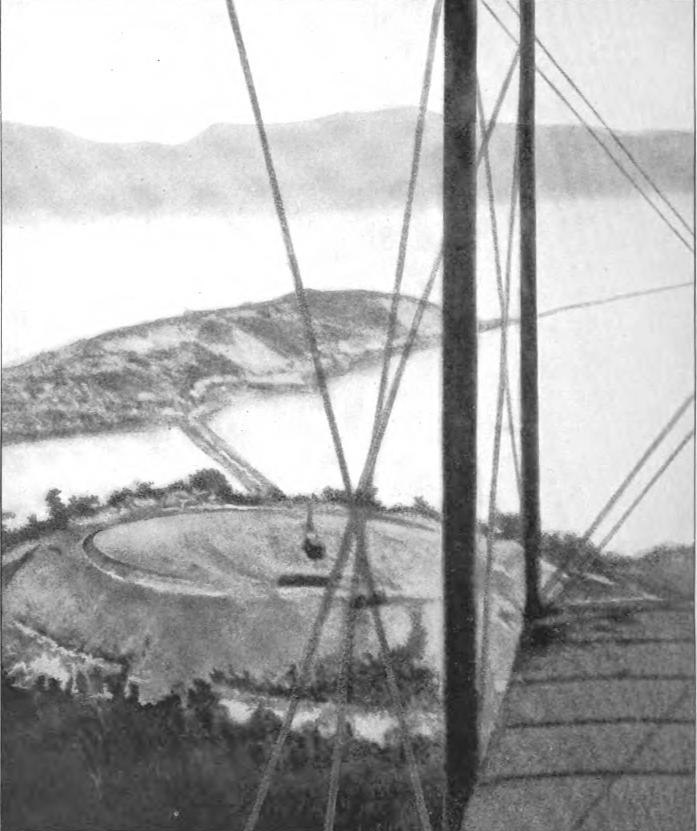
Panama Canal under construction. Photo by Ray Duhem, from flight with Fowler, as published in Sunset.

That same month, pictures taken by Duhem of fortifications in the Panama Canal Zone, as well as photos of the Presidio of San Francisco (then an active military installation), were published in Sunset magazine under the title "Can the Panama Canal Be Destroyed from the Air?" After publication, the Department of War asked the U.S. Attorney in San Francisco, John W. Preston, to investigate the matter. On July 10, 1914, warrants were issued for the arrest of Fowler, Duhem, writer Riley A. Scott, and Sunset editor Charles K. Field, with Preston stating that new regulations passed by US Congress made it illegal "for a civilian to take or publish photographs of any fortification, whether complete or in process of construction.

The following day the men appeared at the United States Commissioner in San Francisco, with Fowler claiming that they had received the permission of the chief engineer of the canal, Colonel George Washington Goethals before flying: "Col. Goethals not only gave his permission, but he wished us the best of luck, and said he hoped the pictures would turn out well." Their trial was set for that August 10, 1914, but by June 15, 1915, a grand jury had declined to review the case. It was ultimately dropped because evidence was insufficient.

=== L-W-F ===
The Lowe, Willard & Fowler Engineering Company, was founded on Long Island, New York, in December 1915. It was named for founders Edward Lowe Jr., Charles F. Willard, and Robert G. Fowler, and was also considered to be named after the construction it developed, the laminated wood fuselage. "Lowe provided most of the financing, while Fowler attracted Willard. Lowe soon secured total control, renaming the firm L-W-F Engineering, and Fowler and Willard departed in 1916."

=== Fowler Airplane Corporation ===
In 1918, Robert Fowler established the Fowler Airplane Corporation, located on Howard Street in San Francisco, to build Curtiss JN-4Ds for the U.S. Army Signal Corps. It was one of six companies that built the design under license.

== Death ==
He died of a heart attack on June 15, 1966, at his home in San Jose, California. He was buried in the Santa Clara Mission Cemetery in Santa Clara, California.

== See also ==
- Editor and aviator are arrested for disclosing military secrets, Morning Press, July 11, 1914.
