= James J. Ward =

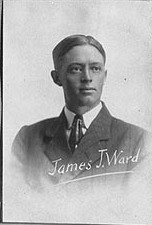
Ward in 1910

James J. Ward (born Jens P. Wilson; 1886 in Denmark – January 7, 1923) was a pioneer aviator who made one of the earliest attempts at transcontinental flight. He was also known as Jimmie Ward.

He flew a Curtiss Model D pusher biplane named the "Hearst Pathfinder". On September 13, 1911, he attempted to win the William Randolph Hearst Prize flying from Governors Island in New York to California. He withdrew from the race on September 22, 1911, after his aircraft's engine failed and he crashed in Addison, New York.

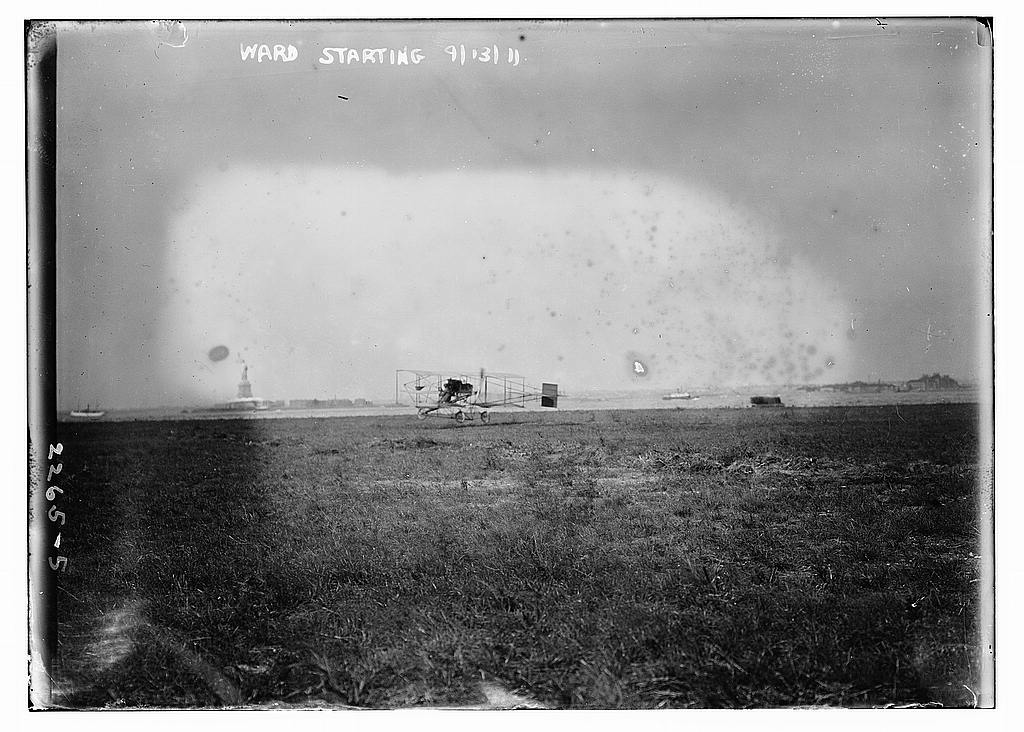
Ward taking off on September 13, 1911
