= Hearst Transcontinental Prize =

The Hearst prize was a $50,000 (approximately $1,728,000 today) aviation prize offered by publisher William Randolph Hearst in October 1910 to the first aviator to fly coast to coast across the United States, in either direction, in fewer than 30 days from start to finish. The prize expired in November 1911 without a winner.

== Attempts ==
- James J. Ward left Governors Island in Manhattan, New York City but crashed on September 22, 1911 in Addison, New York on his way to San Francisco, California.
- Calbraith Perry Rodgers tried to win it, having started too late, but did complete the flight in 49 days, including several crash landings and maintenance delays.
- Robert G. Fowler left San Francisco, California on September 11, 1911 and arrived in Jacksonville, Florida on February 8, 1912, after the prize deadline expired.

== See also ==
- List of aviation awards
