= Curtiss P-1 Hawk =

1923 fighter biplane family by Curtiss

P-1 Hawk
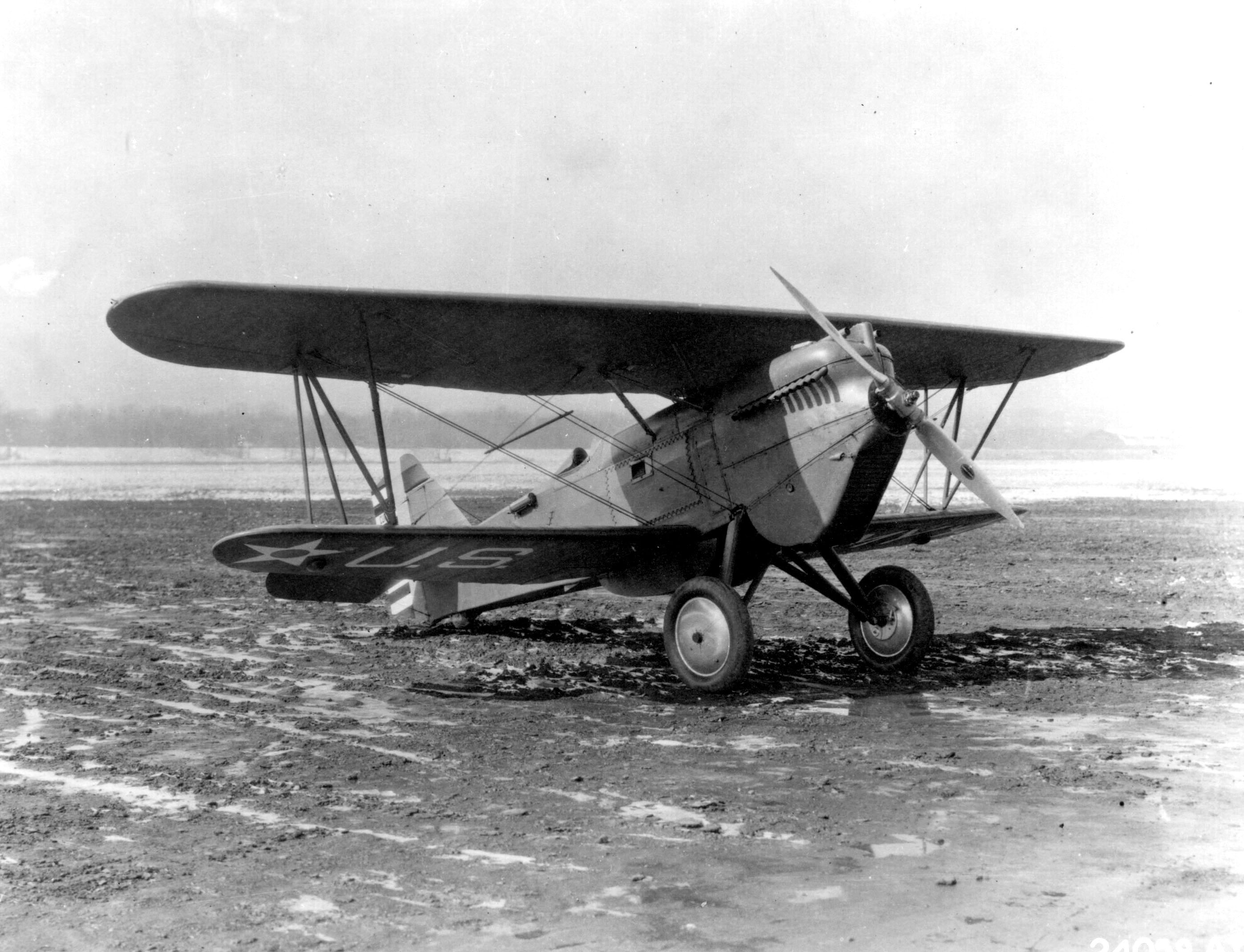
- Curtiss P-1B Hawk

General information
- Type: Fighter plane
- Manufacturer: Curtiss Aeroplane and Motor Company
- Primary user: United States Army Air Corps
- Number built: 202 built as PW-8, P-1, P-2, P-3, P-5, AT-4 and AT-5

History
- Manufactured: 1925–1929
- Introduction date: 27 April 1923
- First flight: January 1923
- Variants: Curtiss F6C Hawk; Curtiss P-6 Hawk

The P-1 Hawk (Curtiss Model 34) is a 1920s open-cockpit biplane fighter aircraft of the United States Army Air Corps. An earlier variant of the same aircraft had been designated PW-8 prior to 1925.

== Design and development ==
=== PW-8 ===
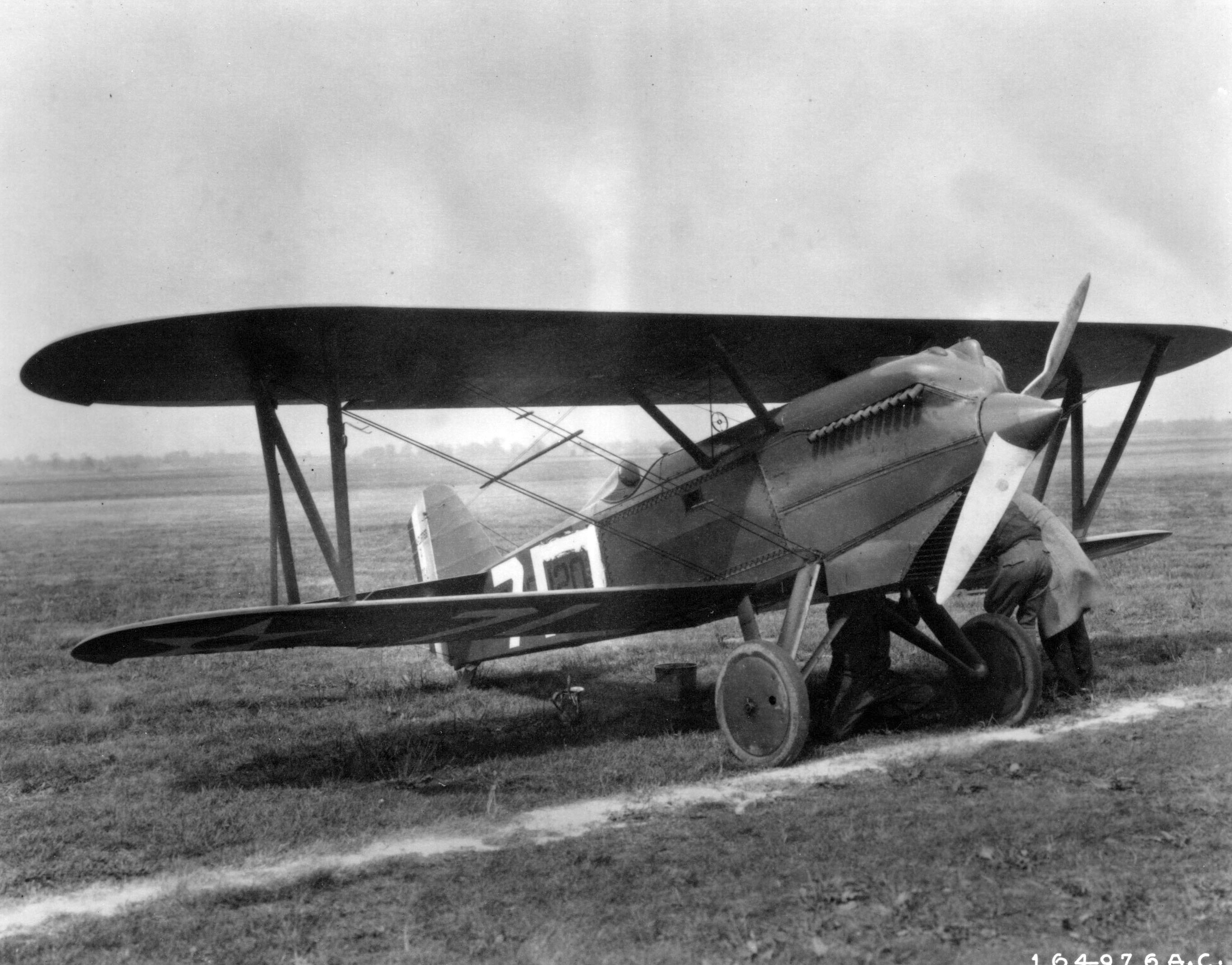
XPW-8B prototype for P-1

The Curtiss P-1 Hawk was the first US Army Air Service aircraft to be assigned the "P" (Pursuit) designation which replaced seven designations for pursuit aircraft, including "PW" (for "Pursuit, Water-cooled engine"). The P-1 was the production version of the Curtiss XPW-8B, an improved variant of the PW-8, 25 of which were operational with the Air Service's 17th Pursuit Squadron

In September 1923, the Army ordered production of the PW-8. The PW-8 (Curtiss Model 33) had been developed from the R-6 racer and was acquired by the Air Service after a competition with the Boeing Model 15, designated the PW-9, to replace the existing Army fighter, the Boeing MB-3A. Although the PW-8 was faster than the PW-9 (both having top speeds in excess of 165 mph), it was otherwise outperformed by the Boeing plane, and its surface radiator cooling system, mounted on the upper and lower surfaces of the top wing for streamlining, was more difficult to maintain and vulnerable in combat. However, the Assistant Chief of the Air Service, Brigadier General Billy Mitchell, agreed to purchase 25 PW-8s in return for assistance by Curtiss in making the Dawn-to-dusk transcontinental flight across the United States.

=== P-1 ===
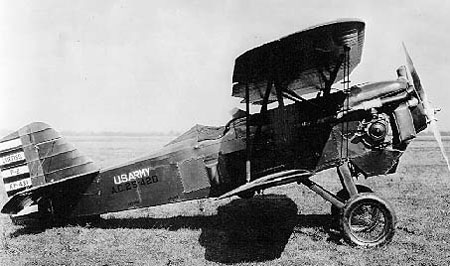
P-2 Hawk

The prototype of the P-1, the XPW-8B, came about when the Air Service, which had selected the Boeing PW-9 over the PW-8 as its main production fighter, asked Curtiss to modify the last of its three original XPW-8 prototypes with wings resembling those of the PW-9. Curtiss designated the modified aircraft its Model 34A and returned it to the Air Service for evaluation, from which the service ordered it into production as the P-1. The first production P-1, serial number 25-410, was delivered on August 17, 1925, and was followed in successive years by the P-1B and P-1C variants with improved engines. The newest P-1 variants remained in operational service until 1930.

The March 7, 1925 order for the P-1 also requested five aircraft with the more powerful 500 hp (373 kW) Curtiss V-1400 engine installed. These were completed in January 1926. The first (SN 25-420) was then modified with a turbocharger mounted on the right side of the fuselage nose, and whose turbine was driven by engine exhaust; the craft was designated XP-2.

However, the Curtiss V-1400 engine did not perform up to expectations, with or without the supercharger, and so after a year in service, three of the standard P-2 Hawks had their engines replaced with the Curtiss D-12 and were consequently redesignated as P-1s. The fifth machine (25-243) received a Curtiss V-1570 Conqueror engine and became the XP-6.

93 production P-1s were brought into service in the P-1, P-1A, P-1B, and P-1C variants. 52 other P-1s, variants P-1D, P-1E, and P-1F, were made by conversion of other Hawk variants, primarily AT-4 and AT-5 trainers.

=== P-3 and P-5 test variants ===
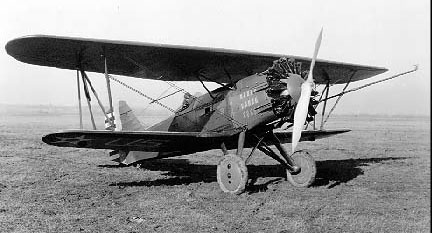
P-3 Hawk

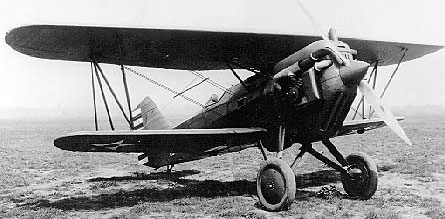
P-5 Superhawk

The P-3 Hawk was similar to the P-1 Hawk but with a radial R-1340-3 Wasp radial engine. The first of the type, designated XP-3A, was the last P-1A (serial 26-300). Originally intended to be powered by a 390 hp (291 kW) Curtiss R-1454, the engine was deemed unsatisfactory and the 410 hp (306 kW) Pratt & Whitney R-1340 engine substituted. A second XP-3A (serial 28-189) included a cowling and spinner to reduce the drag due to the radial engine; entered in the National Air Races of 1929, its speed of 186.84 mph (300.69 km/h) gave it second place in the Thompson Trophy race.

The remaining four aircraft were production P-3As, but primarily used to service test the Pratt & Whitney Wasp engine. In addition to the significant increase in drag, the radial engine also interfered with the pilot's view. Addition of a Townend ring cowling worsened the visibility problem, and had only a limited effect on speed. It was also tested with various types of deep-chord NACA cowls.

Two of the XP-3A aircraft were re-engined in 1929 and 1930 with the Pratt & Whitney R-985-1 Wasp Junior engine. This aircraft was redesignated the XP-21. Tests were run with this aircraft, but it was never developed into a production aircraft, despite the designation.

Five P-5 Superhawks, similar to the P-1C but with a turbocharged Curtiss D-12F engine, were delivered in 1928. They had a top speed of 166 mph (267 km/h) at 25,000 ft (7,620 m), considerably higher than the maximum ceiling of the P-1A, but their low-level performance was inferior

=== AT-4 and AT-5 trainers ===
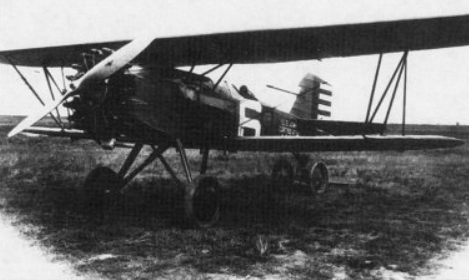
A Curtiss AT-5A, ca. November 1928.

Two single-seat advanced trainer variants were placed into production, the AT-4 and AT-5A, using Wright-Hisso E / Wright-Hisso V-720 V-8 engines. The resulting performance degradation from these lower powered engines resulted in them being deemed dangerous to fly, even for experienced pilots. All were re-engined with Curtiss D-12D engines and returned to use as fighters, designated P-1D and P-1F respectively. Five AT-4/XAT-5 test variants were re-classified as P-1E.

A total of 202 PW-8, P-1, P-2, P-3, P-4, P-5, AT-4, and AT-5 airplanes were delivered.

== Operational history ==
On June 23, 1924, taking off at 3:58 A.M., Army test pilot First Lieutenant Russell Maughan left Mitchel Field, New York, in PW-8 24-204, modified with additional fuel and oil tanks, made a dawn-to-dusk transcontinental flight across the US. Refueling five times, he landed at Crissy Field, San Francisco, California, at 9:46 p.m., one minute before dusk, covering 2,670 mi (4,297 km) in 20 hours and 48 minutes. His flight time included four planned 30-minute stops at McCook Field, Ohio; Saint Joseph, Missouri; Cheyenne, Wyoming; and Salduro Siding, Utah; and an unplanned stop in North Platte, Nebraska for additional fuel when a muddy field in Missouri did not permit him to take on a full load. He also lost an hour at McCook to repair a broken fuel valve after an over-eager mechanic had over-torqued the valve, damaging it.

The original fifteen P-1s served in the 27th and 94th Pursuit Squadrons, 1st Pursuit Group, Selfridge Field, Michigan. The first Hawk to serve with the Air Corps in quantity was the P-1A (17th, 27th, and 94th Pursuit Squadrons) beginning in 1925. In October 1928 the largest order of 33 P-1s was made. These were delivered by April 1929 as P-1Cs.

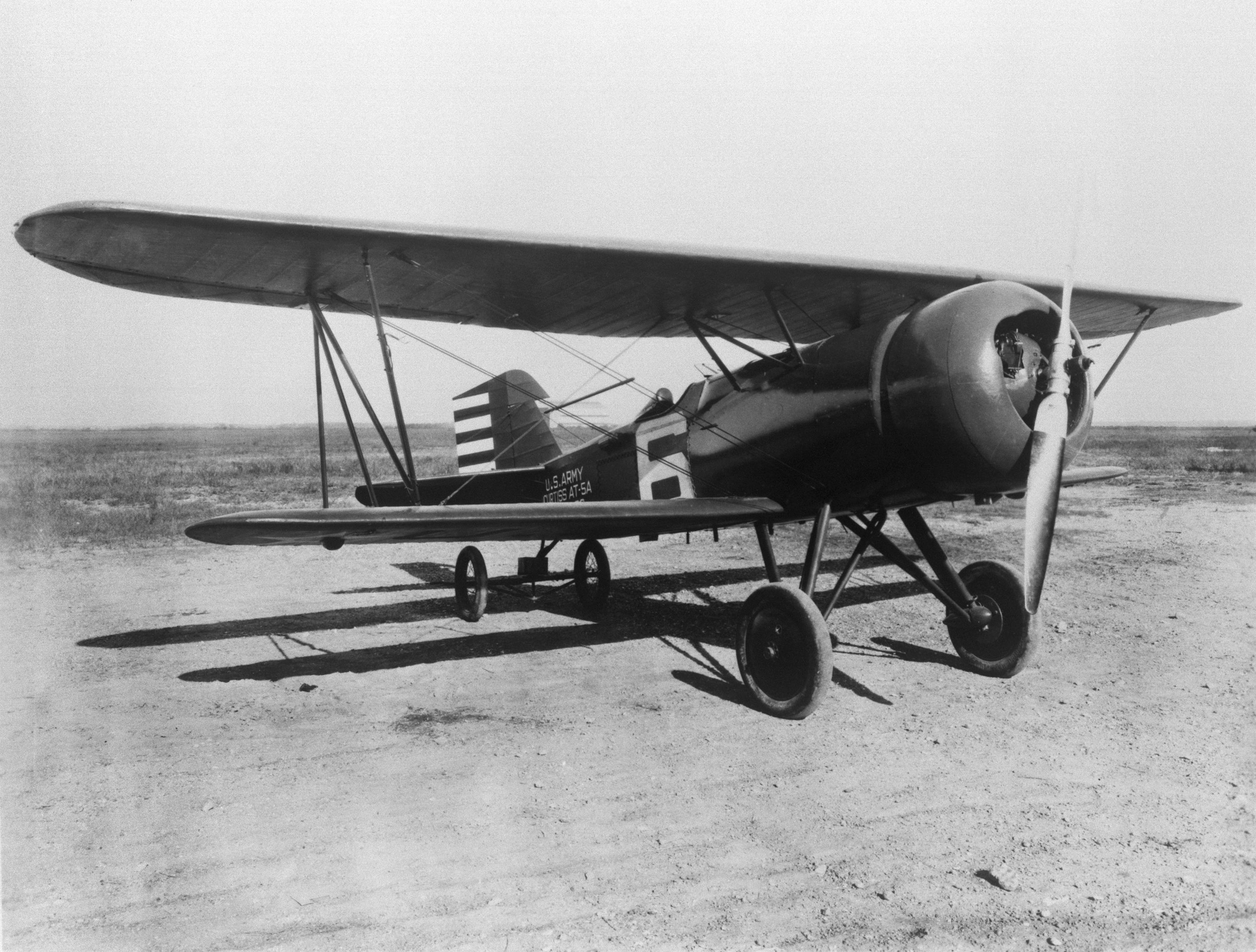
A Curtiss AT-5A (the same aircraft picture above) with a J-5 radial engine and NACA cowling, November 1928.

The AT-4 and AT-5 trainer variants served with the 43rd Pursuit Squadron (School) at Kelly Field, Texas.

After concluding by the end of September 1928 that wind tunnel tests of its "Cowling No. 10" not only cooled an engine more efficiently than leaving an engine's cylinders open to the air, but also that it reduced aerodynamic drag by a factor of 2.6 compared to any other cowling, the U.S. National Advisory Committee on Aeronautics (NACA) tested the cowling on an AT-5A borrowed from the Army Air Corps. The tests demonstrated that the cowling also significantly increased an aircraft's maximum speed, in the case of the AT-5A from 118 miles per hour (103 kn; 190 km/h) to 137 or 138 miles per hour (119 or 120 kn; 220 or 222 km/h). The cowling became known as the NACA cowling.

== Variants ==
While a total of 202 Hawks were built in the basic variants PW-8, P-1, P-2, P-3, P-5, AT-4 and AT-5, conversions resulted in 148 having a P-1 designation.

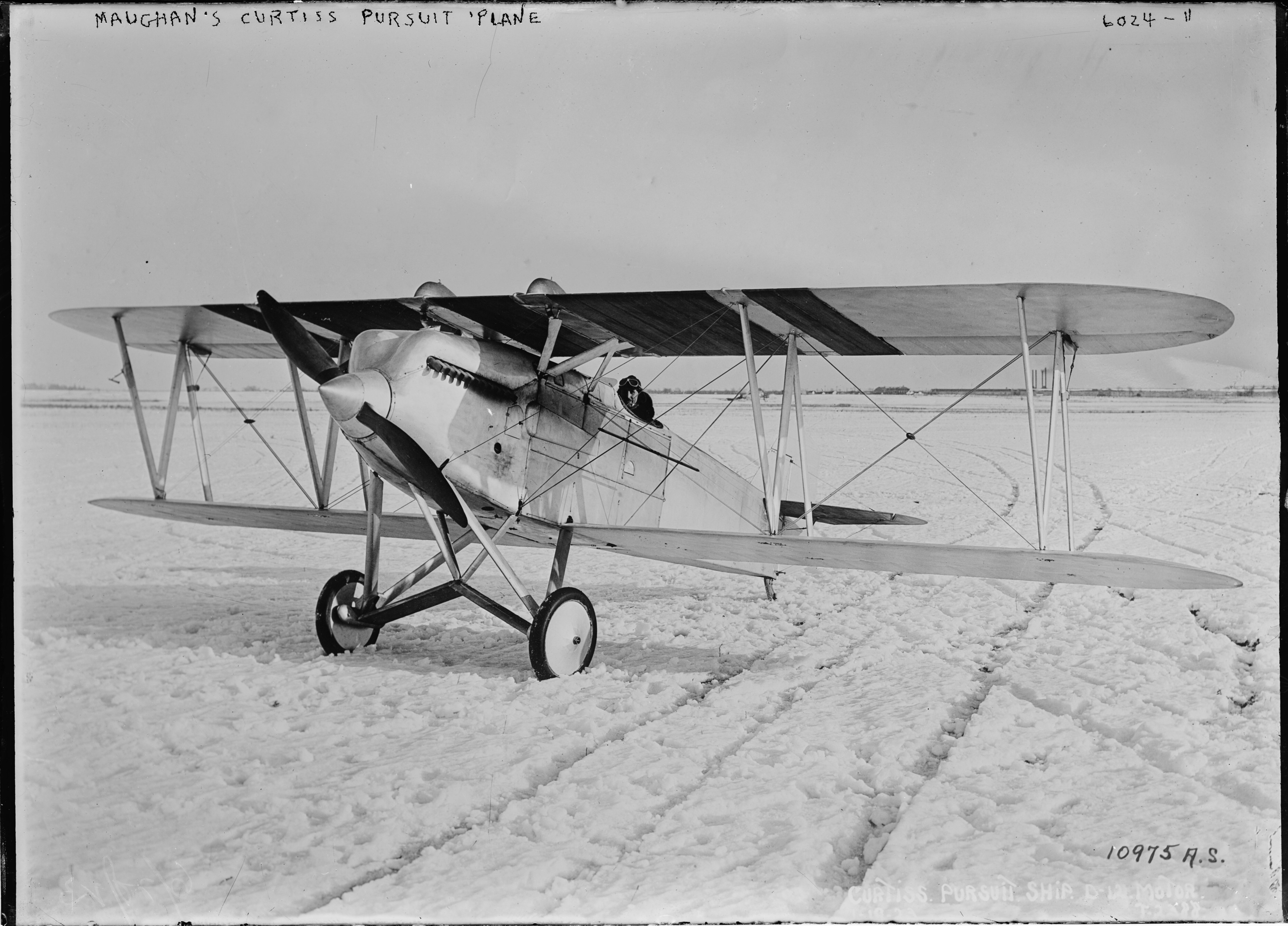
XPW-8

XPW-8
Three manufactured, one modified to XPW-8A and later XPW-8B standard, one converted to CO-X two-seat observation aircraft.
PW-8
25 produced and flown by 17th Pursuit Squadron
XPW-8A
XPW-8 23-1203 converted with a new cooling system and modified wings for trials
XPW-8B
Model 34 – The XPW-8A fitted with single-bay tapered wing as prototype for the P-1 series.
P-1
Model 34A – Production version of the XPW-8B with modified rudder and additional wing center strut, and Clark Y aerofoil, powered by 435 hp (324 kW) Curtiss V-1150-1 (D12), ten built.
P-1A
Model 34G – P-1 with three-inch fuselage stretch, larger wheels and revised fuel system, 25 built with Curtiss D-12C engine and three conversions from P-2. Final two converted to XAT-4 Trainer and XP-3 racer prototypes. Delivered in 1926.
XP-1A
One P-1A used for development trials.
P-1B
Model 34I – 25 produced with Curtiss V-1150-3 (D-12D) engine. Increased weight reduced performance. Delivered 1927.
P-1C
Model 34O – 33 built with Curtiss V-1150-5 (D-12E) engine. Increased weight further decreased performance. delivered 1927–28.
XP-1C
One P-1C fitted with a revised radiator.
P-1D
24 conversions from AT-4 trainers, re-engined with Curtiss V-1150-3 (D-12D) engines.
P-1E
Four converted from AT-5 trainers re-engined with 440 hp (328 kW) V-1150-3 built as AT-4s and converted to XAT-5 prototype. All re-engined and converted to P-1E.
P-1F
24 conversions from AT-5A trainers, one conversion from Curtiss XP-21A, all re-engined with a 440 hp (328 kW) Curtiss V-1150-3 in 1929.
P-2
Model 34B – P-1 with a 500 hp (373 kW) Curtiss V-1400, five built.

Three later converted to P-1A and one re-engined with the Curtiss V-1570-1 as the XP-6.

XP-3
Radial-engined version, one converted from a P-1A with 390 hp (291 kW) Curtiss R-1454 engine, later converted to XP-3A.
XP-3A
XP-3 re-engined with a 410 hp (306 kW) Pratt & Whitney R-1340-1
XP-21
XP-3A re-engined with the Pratt & Whitney R-985 Wasp Junior.
P-3A
Model 34N – five production aircraft to the AT-5A design with a 410 hp (306 kW) Pratt & Whitney R-1340-7.
XP-4
P-1A modified with a supercharged 510 hp (380 kW) Packard 1A-1530 engine.
XP-5
P-1A version with a 435 hp (324 kW) Curtiss V-1150-3 engine.
P-5
Model 34L – four built, same as XP-5 later modified with the Curtiss D-12F engine.
XAT-4
Model 34J – P-1A re-engined with a 180 hp (134 kW) Wright-Hispano E as an advanced trainer.
AT-4
Production version of the XAT-4, 40 ordered, first 35 were converted in 1929 to P-1Ds with the Curtiss D-12 engine, and the remainder completed as AT-5s.
AT-5
Model 34J – five aircraft originally to AT-4s re-engined with a 220 hp (164 kW) Wright J-5, later converted to P-1Es.
AT-5A
Model 34M – 31 aircraft based on the P-1B with a lengthened fuselage, later converted to P-1Fs.
CO-X
The first XPW-8 prototype was converted into a two-seat observation aircraft.

All variants increased in weight with each succeeding model, resulting in slight reductions in performance with each.

== Operators ==
Bolivia

- Four P-1s were supplied to Bolivia.

Chile

- Eight P-1As and eight P-1Bs went to Chile.

Japan

- One P-1A went to Japan.

United States

- United States Army Air Corps

== Survivors ==
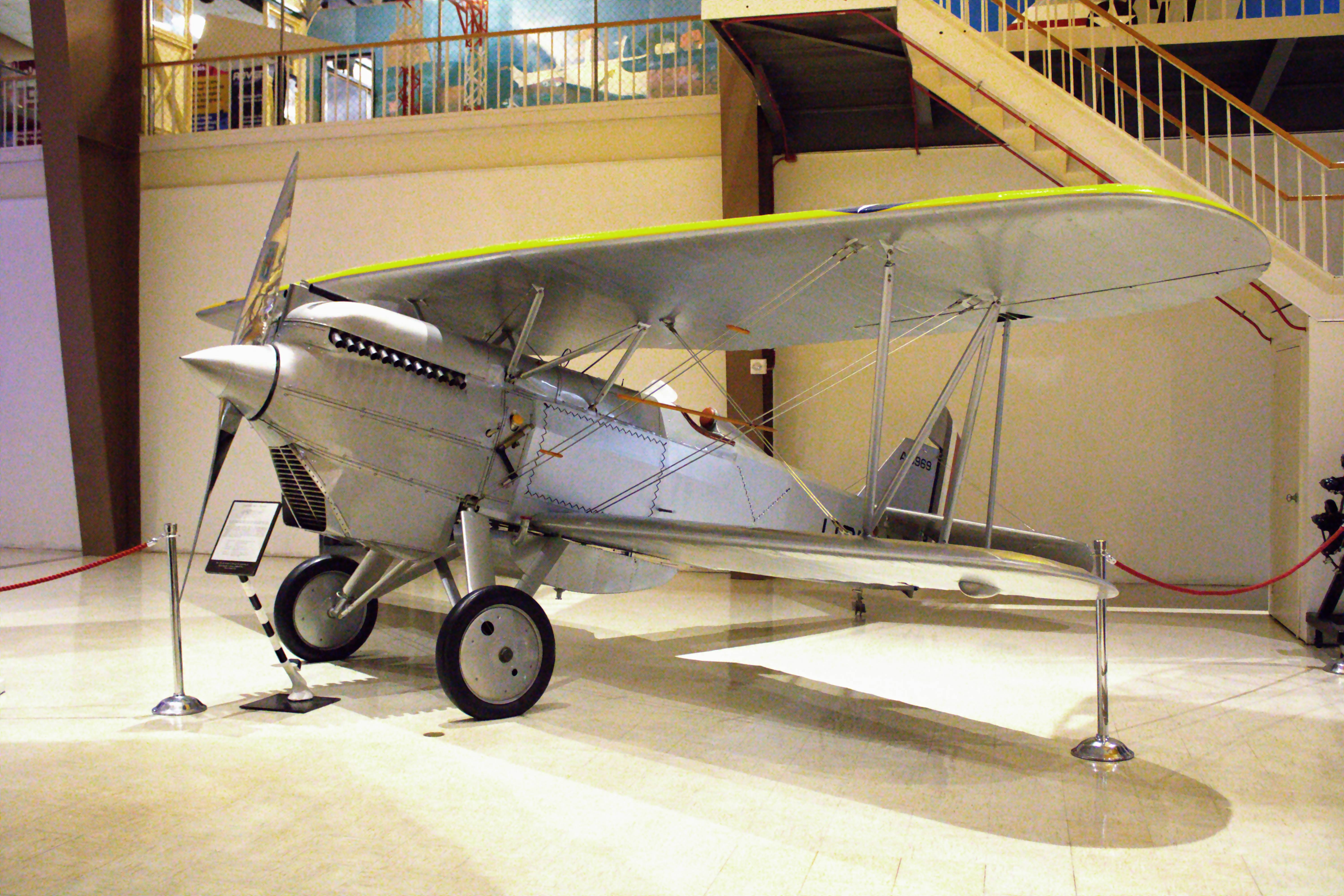
Curtiss P-1 displayed as an F6C-1 at the National Naval Aviation Museum.

A rebuilt Curtiss P-1 (manufacturer serial number 60) is on display at the National Naval Aviation Museum. The aircraft is painted to represent F6C-1 BuNo A6969, which crashed in 1929.

== Specifications (P-1C) ==
Data from Curtiss Aircraft 1907–1947, The Complete Encyclopedia of World Aircraft

General characteristics

- Crew: 1
- Length: 23 ft 0 in (7.01 m)
- Wingspan: 31 ft 6 in (9.60 m)
- Height: 8 ft 9 in (2.67 m)
- Wing area: 252 sq ft (23.4 m^{2})
- Airfoil: Clark Y
- Empty weight: 2,195 lb (996 kg)
- Gross weight: 2,973 lb (1,349 kg)
- Powerplant: 1 × Curtiss D-12C (Curtiss V-1150-3) V-12 water-cooled piston engine, 422 hp (315 kW)
- Propellers: 2-bladed propeller

Performance

- Maximum speed: 154.4 mph (248.5 km/h, 134.2 kn)
- Cruise speed: 123 mph (198 km/h, 107 kn)
- Range: 300 mi (480 km, 260 nmi)
- Service ceiling: 20,800 ft (6,300 m)
- Rate of climb: 1,460 ft/min (7.4 m/s)

Armament

- Guns: 2 × 0.30 in (7.62 mm) fixed forward-firing M1919 Browning machine guns

== See also ==
Related lists

- List of military aircraft of the United States
- List of fighter aircraft

== Bibliography ==
- Hagedorn, Dan (March–May 1992). "Curtiss Types in Latin America". Air Enthusiast. No. 45. pp. 61–77. ISSN 0143-5450.
