= Russell Maughan =

United States Army Air Forces officer

Russell Lowell Maughan
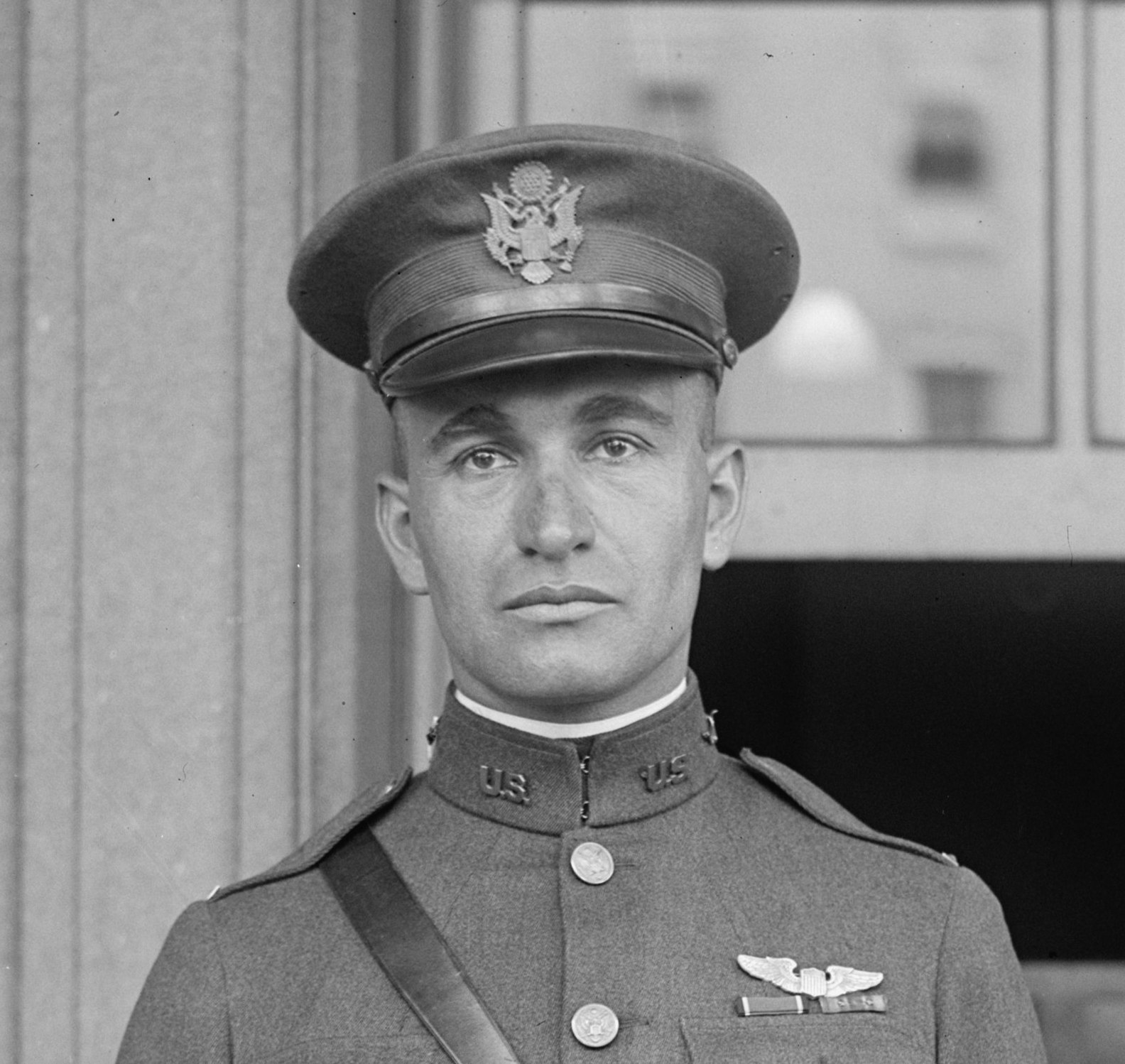
- Born: March 28, 1893; Logan, Utah, U.S.
- Died: April 21, 1958 (aged 65); San Antonio, Texas, U.S.
- Burial place: Logan, Utah, U.S.
- Military career
- Allegiance: United States of America
- Branch: Aviation Section, Signal Corps; Air Service, United States Army; United States Army Air Corps; United States Army Air Forces
- Service years: 1917–1946
- Rank: Colonel
- Awards: Distinguished Service Cross

Russell Lowell Maughan (March 28, 1893 – April 21, 1958) was an officer in the United States Army and a pioneer aviator. His career began during World War I, and spanned the period in which military aviation developed from a minor arm of the Army Signal Corps to the huge Army Air Forces on the verge of becoming a separate service.

Maughan became a pursuit pilot and served in combat in France in 1918 with the United States Army Air Service. Following the war, he remained in the Air Service and became a test pilot. In 1924 Maughan completed the first flight across the continental United States within the hours of daylight of a single calendar day.

== Biography ==
Maughan was born March 28, 1893, in Logan, Utah, to Peter W. and Mary (née Naef) Maughan. He graduated from Utah State Agricultural College (the future Utah State University) in June 1917.

The United States had entered World War I and Maughan enlisted as an Army aviation cadet. Commissioned a first lieutenant in the Signal Officer Reserve Corps after flight training and rated a Reserve Military Aviator, he served in France with the 139th Aero Squadron, where he flew a Spad XIII. Maughan was credited with four aerial victories and awarded the Distinguished Service Cross on October 27, 1918, the citation for which is given below.

He remained in the Air Service following the end of the war and was assigned to its Engineering Division at McCook Field, Dayton, Ohio, as a test pilot. Besides testing new designs, his responsibilities including public demonstrations of military aircraft and participation in air races. The Engineering Division had drawn the interest of Brigadier General Billy Mitchell, Assistant Chief of the Air Service, who saw in it the opportunity for promoting the concept of an air force independent of the Army. On July 1, 1920, when the United States Army Air Service became a combat arm of the Army, Maughan received a regular commission as a first lieutenant, Air Service. He transferred to Crissy Field at the Presidio of San Francisco in 1921 and joined the 91st Observation Squadron, then engaged in aerial forest fire patrol.

In 1922 the National Air Races were held at Selfridge Field, Michigan, where the Air Service entered the Pulitzer Trophy Race with ten aircraft it had solicited from various manufacturers for use as possible pursuit planes, with specification that they be capable of reaching a speed of 190 mph (310 km/h) or greater. Flying a Curtiss R-6 racer, a precursor of the PW-8 design, Maughan won the Pulitzer race with an average speed of 205.86 mph (331.30 km/h), on October 14, 1922. On October 16, flying the 1-kilometre (0.62-mile) course, he averaged 229 mph (369 km/h) for eight circuits, 232.22 mph (373.72 km/h) for four, and reached 248.5 mph (399.9 km/h) on one. This established a new international record, but it was not observed by Fédération Aéronautique Internationale (FAI) officials and was not officially recognized.

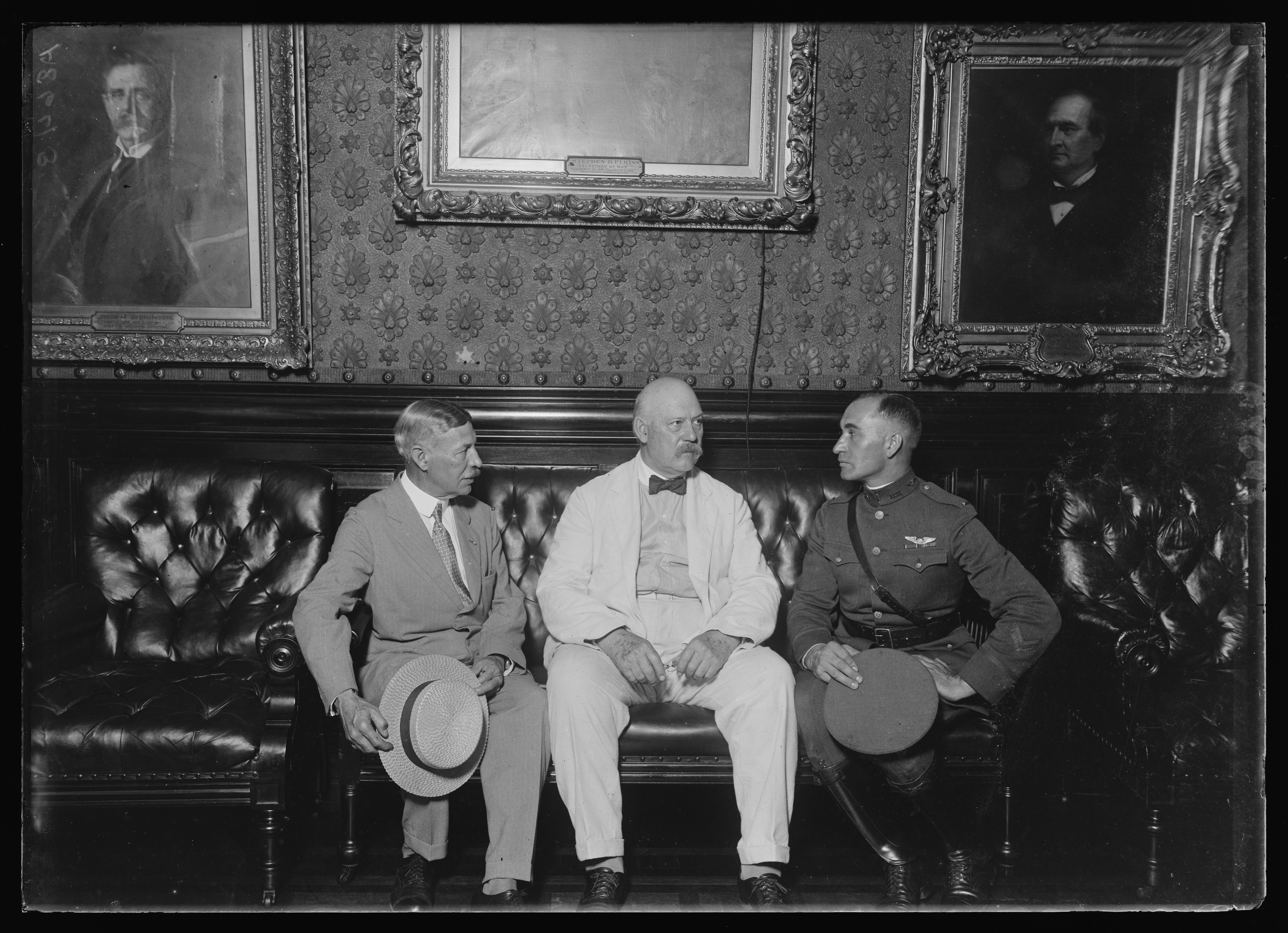
Lt. Russell L. Maughan telling Chief of Air Service Mason Patrick and Secretary of War John W. Weeks about his successful "dawn to dusk" flight.

In 1923 Maughan officially set a new international speed record of 236.5 mph (380.6 km/h). He also made two attempts in July 1923 to fly coast-to-coast in a single day, using the new Curtiss PW-8, but mechanical problems thwarted both flights. On June 23, 1924, his third attempt succeeded, the first dawn-to-dusk transcontinental flight across the United States. The flight was made in six legs, with an actual flying time of 18 hours and 20 minutes, at an average ground speed of more than 156 mph (251 km/h). In 1928 he was awarded the Distinguished Flying Cross for the flight.

Maughan served in the Philippines from 1930 to 1935, with duty as Secretary of Aviation and Consultant to the Philippine Cabinet from 1930 to 1932. In 1939 he surveyed and selected airfields in Greenland and Iceland for aircraft ferry routes to Britain.

Maughan, promoted to lieutenant colonel, commanded the 60th Transport Group, Pope Field, North Carolina, from July 28, 1941, to April 15, 1942. Promoted again to colonel, he was advanced to command of the 51st Troop Carrier Wing from June 1, 1942, to October 20, 1942, which included its deployment to England.

Colonel Maughan retired in 1946, and died April 21, 1958, at San Antonio, Texas, during surgery. He is buried in the Logan City Cemetery near the Utah State University campus in Logan. He is a member of the Utah Aviation Hall of Fame and is honored with a plaque in the Hill Aerospace Museum, Hill Air Force Base, Utah. A plaque commemorating the first "Dawn-to-dusk transcontinental flight across the United States" was erected on the Utah State University campus in Logan on Veterans Day, November 11, 2006.

== Awards ==
- Distinguished Service Cross
- Distinguished Flying Cross
- World War I Victory Medal
- American Defense Service Medal
- American Campaign Medal
- European-African-Middle Eastern Campaign Medal
- World War II Victory Medal

=== Citation for Distinguished Service Cross ===
MAUGHAN, RUSSELL L.

First Lieutenant (Air Service), U.S. Army
Pilot, 139th Aero Squadron, Air Service, A.E.F.
Date of Action: October 27, 1918
Citation:
The Distinguished Service Cross is presented to Russell L. Maughan, First Lieutenant (Air Service), U.S. Army, for extraordinary heroism in action near Sommerance, France, October 27, 1918. Accompanied by two other planes, Lieutenant Maughan was patrolling our lines, when he saw slightly below him an enemy plane (Fokker type). When he started an attack upon it he was attacked from behind by four more of the enemy. By several well-directed shots he sent one of his opponents to the earth, and, although the forces of the enemy were again increased by seven planes, he so skillfully maneuvered that he was able to escape toward his lines. While returning he attacked and brought down an enemy plane which was diving on our trenches.
General Orders No. 46, W.D., 1919
Birth: Logan, UT
Home Town: Logan, UT

=== Citation for Distinguished Flying Cross ===
Rank: First Lieutenant

General Orders: War Department, General Orders No. 4 (1928)

Citation:
The President of the United States of America, authorized by Act of Congress, July 2, 1926, takes pleasure in presenting the Distinguished Flying Cross to First Lieutenant (Air Service) Russell L. Maughan, U.S. Army Air Corps, for extraordinary achievement while participating in an aerial flight. Lieutenant Maughan departed from Mitchel Field, Long Island, New York, at 2:58 a.m. Eastern standard time, on 23 June 1924, in a modified service type pursuit airplane on the dawn-to-dusk flight, and landed at Crissy Field, San Francisco, California, at 9:47 p.m. Pacific time, the same date. He flew over 2,540 miles in 21 hours and 48 and a half minutes, thereby making the fastest time ever made by man between New York and San Francisco.
