= Frank Goldsborough =

- Born: Francis Herbert Goldsborough; July 16, 1910; Washington, D.C., U.S.
- Died: July 16, 1930 (aged 20); Vermont, U.S.
- Cause of death: Air crash

Francis Herbert Goldsborough (July 16, 1910 – July 16, 1930) was a record-holding aviator who died in a plane crash in Vermont on his 20th birthday.

== Early years ==
Goldsborough was born in Washington, D.C. His father was Brice Goldsborough, who died in a plane crash as Frances Wilson Grayson's navigator on an attempted crossing of the Atlantic Ocean from Newfoundland. Frank's stepmother was named Gertrude. By the time he was 18 the family was living in New York where he attended Flushing High School in Queens.

== Transcontinental speed record ==
Goldsborough held the junior transcontinental air speed record until his death. In April and May 1930 he wrote a series of exclusive first-person accounts for The New York Times about his exploits in the National Air Tour and his breaking of the transcontinental air speed record.

== Death ==
Goldsborough's plane crashed in Vermont on July 15, 1930, only a day short of his 20th birthday. His passenger, Don Mockler, walked away from the crash, dazed but alive, and went for help. Goldsborough was trapped in the wreckage with a head injury for 18 hours before he was rescued, alive but not conscious. All his teeth had been knocked out. He was carried away by rescuers on a makeshift stretcher made from a parachute to the home of Harry C. Jenkins.

Goldsborough died on July 16, 1930, at Putnam Memorial Hospital in Bennington on his 20th birthday, without regaining consciousness.

== Funeral ==
He was buried on July 19, 1930, at Woodlawn Cemetery in the Bronx. Charles Lindbergh sent flowers. His body was moved by his stepmother and reburied on 30 July 1930 to Kensico Cemetery in Valhalla, Westchester County, New York. His stepmother, Gertrude Jacobi Goldsborough, and her mother Anna Marie Hoehn Jacobi are buried there as well.

== Timeline ==
- 1910 Birth
- 1930 Set transcontinental airspeed record
- 1930 US Census at 4114 75th Street in Queens, New York
- 1930 Died in crash in Vermont

== Junior transcontinental air speed record holders ==
- 1930 Frank Herbert Goldsborough.
- 1930 Eddie August Schneider.
- 1930 Robert Nietzel Buck.

== See also ==
- 1930 in aviation

Preceded by Richard James (aviator)	Junior Transcontinental Airspeed Record; 1930	Succeeded by Eddie August Schneider
