= 1930 in aviation =

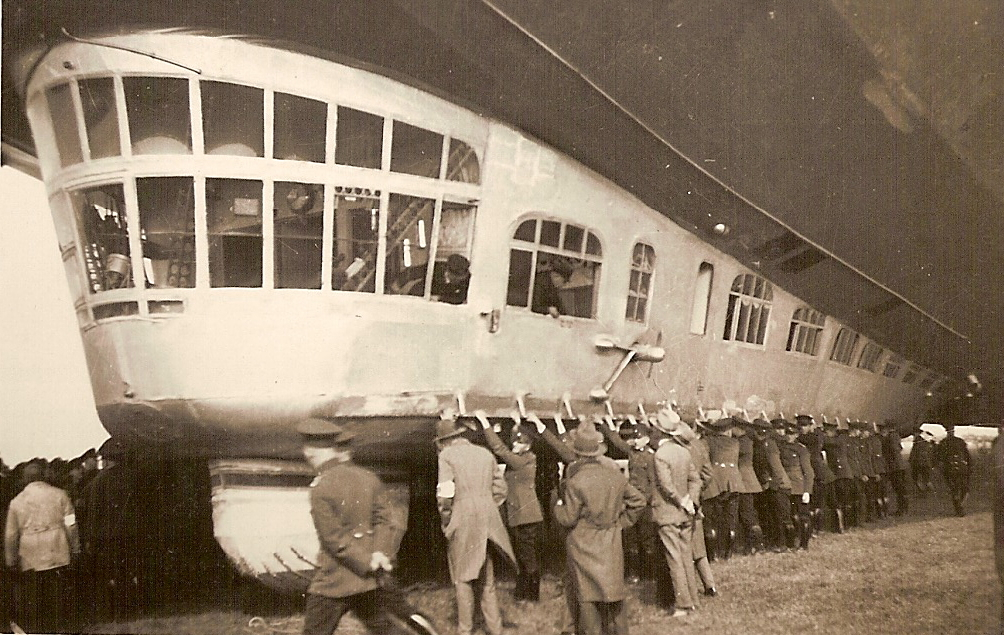
1930, Zeppelin LZ 127 being held down

This is a list of aviation-related events from 1930:

== Events ==
- The Surrey Aero Club inaugurates recreational flights from Gatwick Race Course (now London Gatwick Airport).
- The German airship LZ 127 Graf Zeppelin makes its first crossing of the South Atlantic.
- The Aeromarine-Klemm Corporation, formerly the Aeromarine Plane and Motor Company, goes out of business, although the Uppercu-Burnelli Corporation takes over production of Aeromarine aircraft engines.
- French test pilot Roger Baptiste achieves a speed of 280 km/h (174 mph) at an altitude of 4,000 metres (13,123 ft) in the Bernard 20 monoplane fighter prototype.
- Nineteen-year-old Rex Finney of Los Angeles, California, uses the first successful wingsuit, employing it to increase horizontal movement and maneuverability during a parachute jump.
- A prize for gliding is added to the annual Hindenburg Cup (German: Hindenburg-Pokal). Founded in 1928, it had previously recognized only achievements in powered flight.
- At the Hamilton Standard Propeller Corporation, Frank W. Caldwell develops the first practical variable-pitch propeller. The new propeller improves the propulsive efficiency of modern aircraft with highly supercharged engines, giving them more thrust than a fixed-pitch propeller during takeoff and allowing adjustment to a more efficient setting for flight at different altitudes and speeds.
- Cleveland Municipal Airport (the future Cleveland Hopkins International Airport) in Cleveland, Ohio, becomes the first airport in the United States to establish radio control of airport traffic.
- During the year, the percentage of United States Navy enlisted personnel with an aviation-related rating rises to 9 percent.
- Autumn 1930 – The Royal Air Force rededicates No. 443 Flight of the Fleet Air Arm as the first British catapult flight of aircraft assigned to operate from battleship and cruiser catapults.

=== January ===
- The U.S. National Aeronautic Association announces that the U.S. National Advisory Committee for Aeronautics (NACA) has won the 1929 Collier Trophy for the greatest achievement in American aviation in 1929 for developing the NACA cowling, a major advance in the reduction of aerodynamic drag that has enabled significant gains in speed and fuel efficiency.
- January 1 – Australian National Airways (ANA), the first airline of that name, begins scheduled services. Using six airplanes — five Avro 618 Tens it owns and co-founder Charles Ulm's Fokker VII/3m Southern Cross — it operates a regular passenger and airmail service between Brisbane, Sydney, and Melbourne, Australia.
- January 2 – Leroy Grumman, Leon Swirbul, and William Schwender found the Grumman Aircraft Engineering Corporation at Baldwin on Long Island, New York.
- January 15 – The United States Department of Commerce's Aeronautics Branch (predecessor of the Federal Aviation Administration) has issued a total of 287 type certificates to aircraft.
- January 16
  - On speed trials, the British airship R100 reaches 81 mph (130 km/h), making her the fastest airship in the world.
  - British Royal Air Force officer and engineer Frank Whittle receives a patent for his design of a turbojet aircraft engine. Manufacture of an experimental version of the engine will begin in 1936.
- January 17 – Record-setting aviator Frank Hawks attempts to take off in the Lockheed Air Express Texaco Five (registration NR7955) from a soggy field in West Palm Beach, Florida, but the plane is destroyed in a spectacular crash into a row of three parked aircraft. Hawks is unharmed.
- January 19 – Trying to return to Tijuana, Mexico, after taking off in poor weather for a scheduled passenger flight to Los Angeles, California, Maddux Airlines Flight 7 – the Ford 5-AT-C Tri-Motor NC9689 – crashes in Oceanside, California, and catches fire, killing all 16 people on board. It is the deadliest aviation accident in American history at the time.
- January 25
  - In an amendment to the Air Commerce Regulations, the United States Department of Commerce's Aeronautics Branch sets 500 feet (152 metres) as the minimum altitude at which aircraft may fly over the United States, except when landing and taking off.
  - American Airways is formed out of a group of air carriers that had operated separately under the Aviation Corporation (Avco), a holding company. American Airways will be renamed American Airlines in April 1934.

=== February ===
- At the Philadelphia Navy Yard in Philadelphia, Pennsylvania, the United States Navy tests a Ford 5-AT-74 Trimotor equipped with 30-foot (9.1-meter) floats during the month for use as a torpedo bomber, but does not pursue the concept further.
- February 1 – The Daniel Guggenheim Fund for the Promotion of Aeronautics terminates its activities, having determined that the time had come when private enterprise would find it "practicable and profitable to carry on" the fund's mission.
- February 10 – The Air Union Farman F.63bis Goliath F-FHMY suffers a tailplane structural failure during a flight from Paris-Le Bourget Airport outside Paris to Croydon Airport in London with six people on board. The pilot tries to land at the Pagehurst Emergency Landing Ground in Marden, Kent, England, but the plane stalls and crashes at Marden. Two passengers die, and the other two passengers and both crew members suffer injuries.
- February 15
  - The Italian air power theorist Giulio Douhet dies at the age of 60.
  - The United States Department of Commerce's Aeronautics Branch (predecessor of the Federal Aviation Administration) issues its first airport rating, giving Pontiac Municipal Airport (the future Oakland County International Airport) at Pontiac, Michigan, the highest possible rating of A-1-A. The United States Government intends the rating program — in which airport operators submit voluntary applications for inspection by the Aeronautics Branch — to enable pilots to know at a glance what facilities to expect at any of the rated airports and is part of the Aeronautics Branch’s efforts to encourage airport development through promotional and other activities.
- February 17 – A fire destroys the workshops of the Société d'Aviation Letord at Meudon, France, as well as aircraft, including the first Couzinet 20 and the Couzinet 27 Arc-en-ciel II.
- February 24 – Rancho-Boyeros Airport – the future José Martí International Airport – opens at Havana, Cuba.

=== March ===
- The Government of Chile creates the Directorate General of Civil Aviation as Chile′s national civil aviation authority.
- March 21 – The Chilean army and navy air arms are combined to form the Chilean Air Force.
- March 26 – The United States Department of Commerce's Aeronautics Branch (predecessor of the Federal Aviation Administration) begins issuing approved repair station certificates that entitle repair stations in the United States to repair aircraft of types for which they are adequately equipped, eliminating the previous requirement for them to submit to the Aeronautics Branch detailed drawings of the repairs they make to licensed aircraft and, in some cases, a stress analysis. Boeing Air Transport of Oakland, California, and National Air Transport of Chicago, Illinois, receive the first two certificates.
- March 28 – The Imperial Ethiopian Air Force flies its first mission, when three of its biplanes drop propaganda leaflets over the army of the rebel Gugsa Welle as it advances across Ethiopia's Begemder province. The leaflets prompt some members of his army to desert.
- March 30 – Towed by a Waco ASO biplane, the glider Texaco Eaglet, piloted by Frank Hawks, takes off from San Diego, California, to make a multi-day flight across the continental United States to New York City.
- March 31 – The three Imperial Ethiopian Air Force biplanes reappear over Gugsa Welle's army and bomb it at the beginning of the Battle of Anchem in the first combat mission in the air force's history. The bombing proves decisive, as it prompts so many members of Gugsa Welle's army to desert that it is badly outnumbered by the time ground combat begins between it and Imperial forces at Debre Zebit, when many more of its members desert, resulting in its defeat and Gugsa Welle's death.

=== April ===
- A float-equipped Cierva C.12 autogyro – dubbed the "Hydrogiro" – takes off from Southampton Water off the south coast of England. It is the first time that a rotary-wing aircraft takes off from a body of water.
- April 1 – Gerhard Fieseler founds the Fieseler aircraft manufacturing company under the name Fieseler Flugzeugbau Kassel.
- April 2
  - The first Korean aviator, An Chang-nam, dies in the crash of his aircraft while he is returning to the airport at the Shanxi Aviation Academy at Taiyuan, Shanxi, China, in bad weather.
  - The prototype of the Latécoère 340 trimotor parasol-winged flying boat (registration F-AKDI) breaks up in the air and crashes while being demonstrated for a French Navy official, killing both men on board. No further examples of the aircraft are built.
- April 6
  - Flying the Wright XF3W-1 Apache, United States Navy Lieutenant Apollo Soucek sets a world altitude record, climbing to 43,166 feet (13,157 meters).
  - Towed by a Waco ASO biplane, the glider Texaco Eaglet, piloted by Frank Hawks, arrives at New York City after an eight-day journey from San Diego, California, during which it has spent 44 hours 10 minutes in the air. The flight demonstrates the feasibility of towing gliders over long distances.
- April 9 – Flying his de Havilland DH.60 Moth Miss India, Man Mohan Singh becomes the first Indian to fly solo from England to British India, landing at RAF Drigh Road in Karachi one month and one day after departing from Croydon Airport.
- April 10 – Flying the Junkers G 38 D-2000, Wilhelm Zimmermann sets four new world records for an aircraft carrying a payload of 5,000 kilograms (11,023 lb), averaging a record 184.5 km/h (114.6 mph) over a distance of 100 kilometres (62.1 mi) and a record 172.9 km/h (107.4 mph) over a distance of 500 kilometres (311 mi) and setting a distance record of 501.6 kilometres (311.7 mi) and an endurance record of 3 hours 2 minutes.
- April 10–20 – The English aviator and ornithologist Mary Russell, Duchess of Bedford, and her personal pilot C. D. Barnard make a record-breaking flight in the Fokker F.VII Spider (G-EBTS) of 9,000 miles (14,500 km) from Lympne Airport in Lympne, England, to Cape Town, South Africa, in 100 flying hours over 10 days.
- April 23 – A diesel-engined Verville Air Coach cabin monoplane crashes into a hill near Attica, New York, in a blinding snowstorm during a flight from Detroit, Michigan, to New York City, killing the three men on board. Among the dead is Lionel Woolson, designer of the radial air-cooled aero diesel engine used in the plane.
- April 27 – During an air show at Fayetteville, Tennessee, pilot Milton P. Covert's plane loses altitude and crashes on a railroad embankment while approaching the landing area, striking spectators standing on the embankment. Covert survives, but at least nine spectators are killed and about 20 injured.
- April 29 – The United States Congress passes the Air Mail Act of 1930, also known as the McNary-Watres Act. It changes the way in which the United States Government pays airlines to carry air mail, replacing weight as the basis for computing payment with a space-mile formula. It also gives the Postmaster General of the United States very broad regulatory control over air mail route locations, route consolidations and extensions, contract bidding conditions, service conditions, equipment and personnel accounts, and compensation.

=== May ===
- May 5 – Hoping to stimulate passenger air traffic, the United States Post Office Department orders the installation of at least two passenger seats in each mail plane operated by day.
- May 5–14 – Amy Johnson makes the first solo flight from England to Australia by a woman, flying from Croydon to Darwin in a de Havilland Gipsy Moth.
- May 11 – The New York Air Show of the Aeronautical Chamber of Commerce is held at Madison Square Garden
- May 12–13 – Flying for Aéropostale, the French pilot Jean Mermoz makes the first nonstop commercial flight across the South Atlantic Ocean, flying from Dakar, Senegal, to Natal, Brazil, in the float-equipped Latécoère 28-3 mail plane Comte de la Vaulx. The 3,058-kilometer (1,900-mile) flight takes 19 hours 35 minutes, and the plane carries 122 kilograms (269 pounds) of mail. On the return flight, Mermoz is forced to ditch Comte de la Vaux at sea; although he, his two companions, and the mail are saved, the aircraft sinks and is lost.
- May 15
  - Boeing Air Transport inaugurates the first "airline stewardess" (now known as flight attendant) service. The first stewardess is Ellen Church, a registered nurse who has been described as the first female crew member aboard a commercial airliner.
  - The United States Department of Commerce issues a requirement for airlines in the United States engaged in interstate passenger service to obtain a certificate of authority to operate. To qualify, an airline must demonstrate that its aircraft are properly equipped and maintained and that it has a sufficient number of qualified airmen and an adequate ground organization for the services it provides. In addition, the routes an airline serves must possess such air navigation facilities as the Department deems necessary for safe and reliable operations. Airlines must apply for the certificate by July 15, although this deadline later is extended to August 15.
- May 18 – The German dirigible Graf Zeppelin leaves Friederichshafen, Germany, on the first airship flight across the South Atlantic, bound for Rio de Janeiro, Brazil. It is a trial flight to test the feasibility of regular airship service between Germany and Brazil.
- May 19 – Postmaster General of the United States Walter Folger Brown holds the first of a series of meetings with representatives of the large American commercial airlines to discuss air mail routes to be awarded under the Air Mail Act of 1930, also known as the McNary-Watres Act. All but two of the 22 air mail contracts awarded under the act go to airlines which attend the meetings, which subsequently are criticized as "spoils conferences."
- May 23 – President Herbert Hoover presents the crew of the flying boat NC-4 with gold medals for completing the first transatlantic flight in 1919.
- May 27 – A CLASSA Ford 4-AT trimotor makes the first flight between Peninsular Spain and the Canary Islands, landing at Los Rodeos Airport on Tenerife Island.

=== June ===
- June 3 – In a brief ceremony on the grounds of the White House in Washington, D.C., the U.S. National Aeronautic Association presents the U.S. National Advisory Committee for Aeronautics (NACA) with the 1929 Collier Trophy for the greatest achievement in American aviation in 1929 for developing the NACA cowling, a major advance in the reduction of aerodynamic drag that has enabled significant gains in speed and fuel efficiency. President Herbert Hoover presents the trophy to NACA chairman Dr. Joseph S. Ames.
- June 4 – United States Navy Lieutenant Apollo Soucek sets a new seaplane altitude record of 43,166 ft (13,157 m) in an F3W Apache.
- June 5 – Just after takeoff from Jeffery Field in Boston, Massachusetts, for a flight to New York City with 15 people on board, the Colonial Air Transport Ford 5-AT-B Trimotor NC9675 noses down and crashes into the sea, coming to rest in 7 feet (2.1 meters) of water 60 yards (55 meters) from the breakwater. One of the passengers is killed and the aircraft is damaged beyond repair, but the other 12 passengers and both crew members survive.
- June 13 – Making his 92nd crossing of the Andes carrying mail between Argentina and Chile for Aéropostale, French aviator Henri Guillaumet crashes his Potez 25 in bad weather at Laguna del Diamante near Mendoza, Argentina. He walks through three mountain passes before reaching a village and safety on June 19.
- June 20 – The United States Department of Commerce's Aeronautics Branch (predecessor of the Federal Aviation Administration) issues an aircraft type certificate to a glider for the first time. The Detroit G1 Gull receives the certificate.

=== July ===
- July 12 – Flying a Waco JYM biplane to Chicago, Illinois, Northwest Airways pilot Mal Freeburg sees that the Chicago, Burlington & Quincy Railroad trestle near Trevino, Wisconsin, is on fire shortly after he flies over a Burlington Blackhawk express passenger train headed for the trestle. He flies at low level back up the tracks and makes three low passes to warn the train, flashing his landing lights and dropping landing flares. The train stops only 400 yards (370 m) short of the burning trestle.
- July 16–August 8 – The second International Tourist Aircraft Contest Challenge 1930 takes place in Berlin. The German crew of Fritz Morzik wins it in the BFW M.23.
- July 19
  - Transcontinental and Western Air (TWA), the future Trans World Airlines is incorporated as a first step in merging Transcontinental Air Transport and Western Air Express to form TWA. Postmaster General of the United States Walter Folger Brown forces the merger so that he will have a larger airline to which he can award air mail contracts.
  - Record-holding aviator Frank Goldsborough dies in a crash in Vermont on his 20th birthday.
- July 20-August 1 – A 7,560 km (4,700 mi) race over Europe takes place as part of the Challenge 1930 contest.
- July 23 – Aviation pioneer Glenn Curtiss dies, aged 52.
- July 29 – The British airship R100 sets out on a test flight from the United Kingdom to Montreal, Quebec, Canada, and back. She will arrive at Montreal 78 hours later, remain there for 12 days, then begin the return trip to the United Kingdom on August 13, arriving in London on August 16 after a flight of 57½ hours.

=== August ===
- August 3 – The Imperial Japanese Navy practices dive bombing for the first time, using fighters to sink the retired protected cruiser Akashi with 4 kg (8.8 lb) practice bombs in Tokyo Bay.
- August 8 – End of the Challenge 1930 contest, won by Fritz Morzik.
- August 13 – Flying the Travel Air Type R Mystery Ship Texaco 13, Frank Hawks sets a new west-to-east transcontinental airspeed record for a flight across the continental United States, completing the flight in 12 hours 25 minutes 3 seconds. At the time, it is the fastest crossing of the United States ever made.
- August 18 – Eastern Air Transport (the future Eastern Air Lines) begins its first passenger service, flying passengers between New York City and Washington, D.C.
- August 22 – Attempting to avoid a thunderstorm in poor weather on a domestic passenger flight in Czechoslovakia from Kbely Airport in Bratislava to Brno, the Czechoslovak State Airlines Ford 5-AT-C Tri-Motor OK-FOR banks sharply to avoid a 35-meter-tall (115-foot-tall) smokestack, strikes the ground, and crashes at Jihlava, killing 12 of the 13 people aboard.
- August 23 – The Ford National Reliability Air Tour starts in Chicago.
- August 25 – Eddie August Schneider sets the junior transcontinental air speed record. He flies from Westfield, New Jersey.
- August 27 – Piloting the Lockheed 5C Vega Winnie Mae in the National Air Races, Wiley Post flies from Chicago, Illinois, to Los Angeles, California, in a record time of 9 hours 9 minutes 4 seconds.

=== September ===
- September 1–2 – Flying the Breguet 19 Super Bidon "?" from Paris to New York City, French aviators Dieudonné Costes and Maurice Bellonte make the first nonstop westbound heavier-than-air flight across the North Atlantic Ocean between the European and North American mainlands, covering either 5,850 or 6,200 km (3,640 or 3,850 mi), according to different sources, in 37 hours 18 minutes.
- September 11 – The sixth Ford National Reliability Air Tour begins as its 18 entrants take off from Ford Airport in Dearborn, Michigan. The tour cross-markets Ford Motor Company and its Stout Metal Airplane Division and showcases Henry Ford's interest in aviation.
- September 27 – The sixth Ford National Reliability Air Tour concludes with the return of the participants to Dearborn, completing a 4,814-mile (4,183 nmi; 7,747 km) route which began with stops at Kalamazoo, Michigan; Chicago, Illinois; Davenport, Iowa; Wausau and Eau Claire, Wisconsin; Duluth, Minnesota; and Grand Forks, North Dakota, before the itinerary took them into Canada. There they had made stops at Winnipeg and Brandon, Manitoba; Regina, Moose Jaw, Saskatoon, and North Battleford, Saskatchewan; and Edmonton, Calgary, and Lethbridge, Alberta. They had then returned to the United States and stopped at Great Falls, Montana; Sheridan, Casper, and Cheyenne, Wyoming; Denver and Colorado Springs, Colorado; Garden City and Wichita, Kansas; Enid, Oklahoma; Kansas City, Missouri; Springfield, Illinois; Terre Haute, Indiana; and Cincinnati, Ohio. Harry Russell takes first place in a Ford Trimotor, and Eddie August Schneider, who finishes in eighth place overall in a Cessna AW, wins the Great Lakes Trophy, presented for the first time to the fastest plane with an engine of 510 cubic inches (8,357 cubic centimetres) or less.

=== October ===
- October 1 – Western Air Express and Transcontinental Air Transport merge to form Transcontinental and Western Air, Inc., which in 1950 will be renamed Trans World Airlines.
- October 5 – The British dirigible R101, at the time the world's largest airship, crashes in France while on a flight from Cardington, Bedfordshire, England, to Karachi in British India. Forty-eight of the 54 people on board are killed, including Royal Air Force Air Vice Marshal Sir Sefton Brancker; the Irish aviator and athlete Herbert Carmichael Irwin, who was the captain of R101; the noted British airship pilot and engineer George Herbert Scott; and British Secretary of State for Air Christopher Thomson, 1st Baron Thomson.
- October 7 – Upon the completion of the final game of the 1930 World Series in Philadelphia, Pennsylvania, Frank Hawks flies photographs of the game to North Beach Airport in Queens, New York, in the Travel Air Type R Mystery Ship Texaco 13, delivering them only 20 minutes after the end of the game and faster than wire services, demonstrating that fast air courier services are feasible.
- October 9–10 – First flight by a Canadian, pilot Capt. J. Erroll Boyd (1891–1960), from North America (Harbour Grace, NL) to England, in the Wright-Bellanca WB-2 Maple Leaf (aka, Columbia), navigated by the American, Lieut. Harry Connor. This flight was also notable for transporting mail bearing a surcharged stamp as a commemorative overprint.
- October 15 – American Airways (the future American Airlines) begins all-air service between Atlanta, Georgia, and Los Angeles, California.
- October 25 – Transcontinental and Western Air (TWA), the future Trans World Airlines, begins the first all-air coast-to-coast passenger service betyween coastal cities in the United States with regular passenger flights between Newark, New Jersey (serving New York City) and Los Angeles, California. The service begins with simultaneous takeoffs by two TWA airliners, one heading west from Newark and one heading east from Los Angeles. The trip takes 30 hours and includes an overnight stop in Kansas City, Missouri.
- October 30 – The Imperial Airways Handley Page W.8g Hamilton City of Washington (registration G-EBIX) crashes into high ground in dense fog at Boulogne, France, during a scheduled flight from Paris-Le Bourget Airport outside Paris to Croydon Airport in London. Three of the six people on board die.

=== November ===
- November 3 – Brothers Thomas Elmer Braniff and Paul Revere Braniff found their second airline, Braniff Airways, Inc. It eventually will become Braniff International Airways.
- November 13 – Braniff Airways begins operations, using Lockheed Vega aircraft to offer service between Oklahoma City, Oklahoma; Tulsa, Oklahoma; and Wichita Falls, Texas.
- November 21 – The Dornier Do R4 Superwal flying boat airliner I-RONY, operating on a passenger flight for the Italian airline Società Anonima Navigazione Aerea (SANA), disappears over the Mediterranean Sea during a flight from Barcelona, Spain, to Marseille, France, with the loss of all six people on board.
- November 24 – The Ford Motor Company Ford 5-AT-C Trimotor NX419H crashes on landing at Ford Airport in Dearborn, Michigan, killing both people on board.

=== December ===
- The German aircraft company Bäumer Aero is liquidated at the end of 1930.
- December 3 – A commercial airline flight arrives in Jamaica for the first time when a Pan American Airways Consolidated Commodore flying boat lands in the harbor at Kingston.
- December 16–17 – Representatives of 45 U.S. states, the District of Columbia, Puerto Rico, and the Insular Government of the Philippine Islands attend the National Conference on Uniform Aeronautic Regulatory Laws to discuss uniformity of air regulations in the United States and its territories. The United States Department of Commerce's Aeronautics Branch (the predecessor of the Federal Aviation Administration) hosts the conference.
- December 17 – The Junkers W 34 Bolivar makes the first international flight from Venezuela to Colombia to commemorate the centennial of the death of Simón Bolívar.
- December 31 – Airworthiness regulations for aircraft components and accessories go into effect in the United States.

== First flights ==
- Aichi AB-2
- Arado Ar 64
- Avro 626
- Bellanca Aircruiser
- Bellanca CH-400 Skyrocket
- Dewoitine D.33
- Farman F.141
- FBA 310
- Focke-Wulf A 32
- Focke-Wulf A 33
- Kawasaki Type 92
- Martin XT6M
- Nakajima E4N
- Nakajima Ki-6
- Northrop Alpha
- Pitcairn PA-8
- Polikarpov TB-2
- Potez 38
- Saro Cloud
- Texaco Eaglet, prototype of the Franklin PS-2
- Yokosuka K4Y
- Spring 1930 – RWD-4

=== January ===
- Potez 39
- January 13 – Farman F.300
- January 30 – Boeing Model 202, later redesignated Boeing XP-15

=== February ===
- Boeing Model 205, later redesignated Boeing XF5B-1
- Latécoère 340 F-AKDI

=== March ===
- Dornier Do Y
- March 30 – Polikarpov I-6

=== April ===
- RWD-3
- April 29 - Polikarpov I-5

=== May ===
- Bernard S-72
- Bernard S-73
- Mitsubishi K3M (Allied reporting name "Pine")
- Berliner-Joyce XFJ-1
- Cessna CR-2
- Curtiss XP-10
- May 6 – Boeing Monomail
- May 16 – Blériot 110
- May 28 – Blackburn Segrave

=== June ===
- Curtiss XP-17 Hawk
- June 12 – Handley Page H.P. 38, prototype of the Handley Page Heyford
- June 28 – Avro 621, prototype of the Avro Tutor and Avro Sea Tutor

=== July ===
- Saunders A.7 Severn
- July 18 - Blackburn Sydney

=== August ===
- August 24 – Latécoère 380

=== September ===
- Lockheed Altair
- September 1 - Berliner-Joyce P-16
- September 12 - Taylor E-2
- September 24 - Short Rangoon

=== October ===
- PZL P.7
- October 5 – Junkers Ju 52
- October 10 – Short S.15 K.F.1, prototype of the Kawanishi H3K
- October 13 – Junkers Ju 52/1m
- October 16 – Saro A.21 Windhover ZK-ABW
- October 22 – Fairchild 100

=== November ===
- First week of November – Couzinet 20
- November 14 – Handley Page HP.42
- November 18 – Boeing Model 96, later redesignated Boeing XP-9
- November 25 – Fairey Hendon
- November 27 – Bernard 80 GR

=== December ===
- Curtiss XP-21
- Westland C.O.W. Gun Fighter
- December 22 - Tupolev ANT-6

== Entered service ==
- Amiot 122 with the French Air Force
- Polikarpov R-5 with the Soviet Air Force
- Saro A17 Cutty Sark

=== January ===
- January 1 – Avro 618 Ten with Australian National Airways

=== May ===
- May 1 – Curtiss F8C Helldiver, the first United States Navy dive bomber designed as such, with Fighter Squadron 1 (VF-1B) aboard USS Saratoga (CV-3)

=== July ===
- Levasseur PL.7 with French Naval Aviation aboard the aircraft carrier Béarn

=== November ===
- November 9 – Ford RR-4, a version of the Ford Trimotor, with the U.S. Navy.

== Retirements ==
- Curtiss P-1 Hawk by the United States Army Air Corps

=== May ===
- Curtiss TS-1 by the United States Navy
