= Eddie August Schneider =

American aviator (1911–1940)

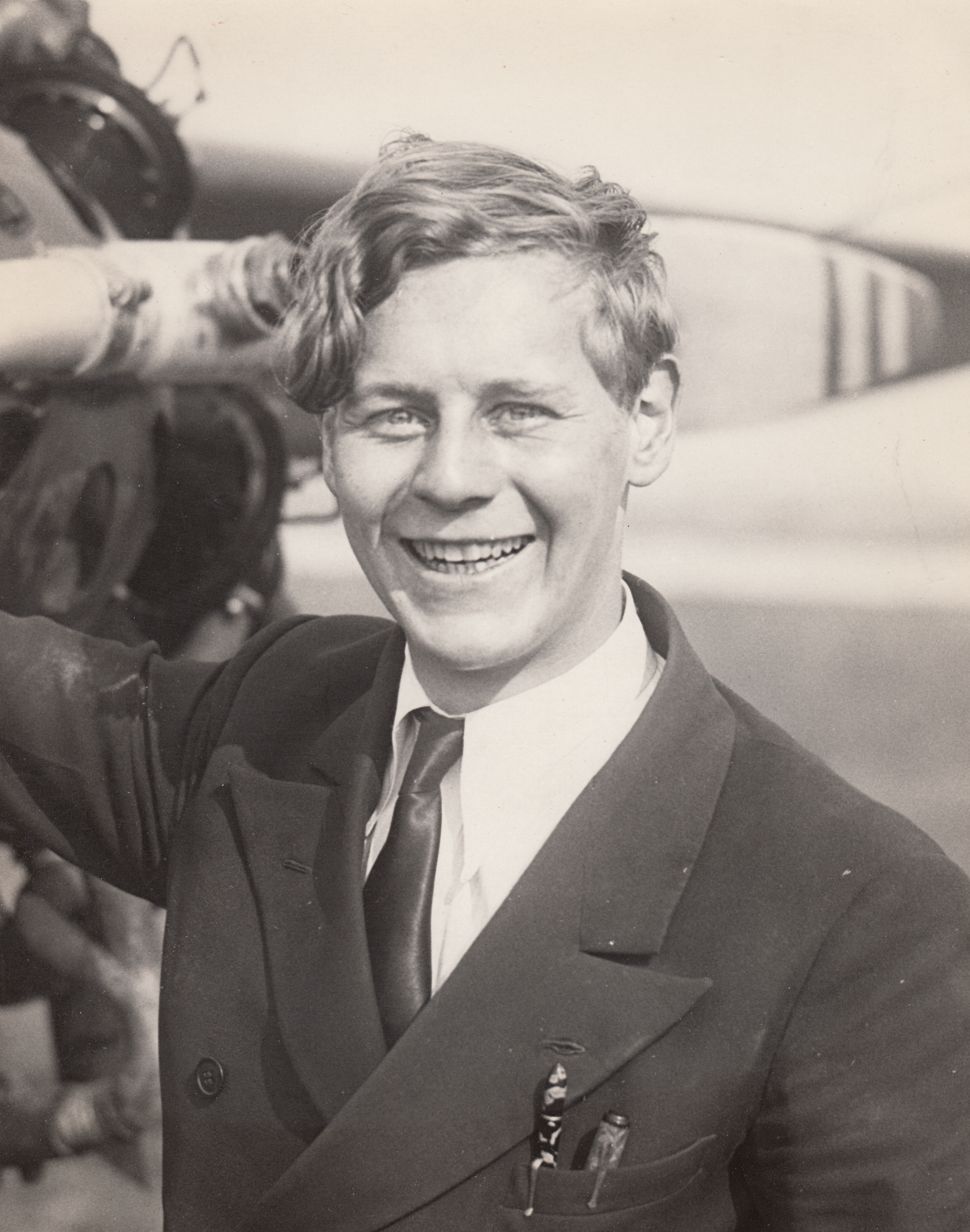
- Schneider on September 10, 1930, in Detroit, Michigan, for the National Air Races

Personal details
- Born: Eddie August Henry Schneider; October 20, 1911 New York City, U.S.
- Died: December 23, 1940 (aged 29) New York City, U.S.
- Cause of death: Mid-air collision
- Resting place: Fairview Cemetery
- Spouse: Gretchen Hahnen (m. 1934)
- Parent(s): Emil August Schneider (1886–1955); Inga Karoline Pedersen (1882–1927)
- Education: William L. Dickinson High School
- Occupation: Aviator
- Known for: Transcontinental record; National Air Tour; Great Lakes Trophy; Yankee Squadron
- Military career
- Allegiance: Spanish Republic
- Branch: Yankee Squadron
- Service years: 1935–1936
- Rank: Aviator
- Conflicts: Spanish Civil War

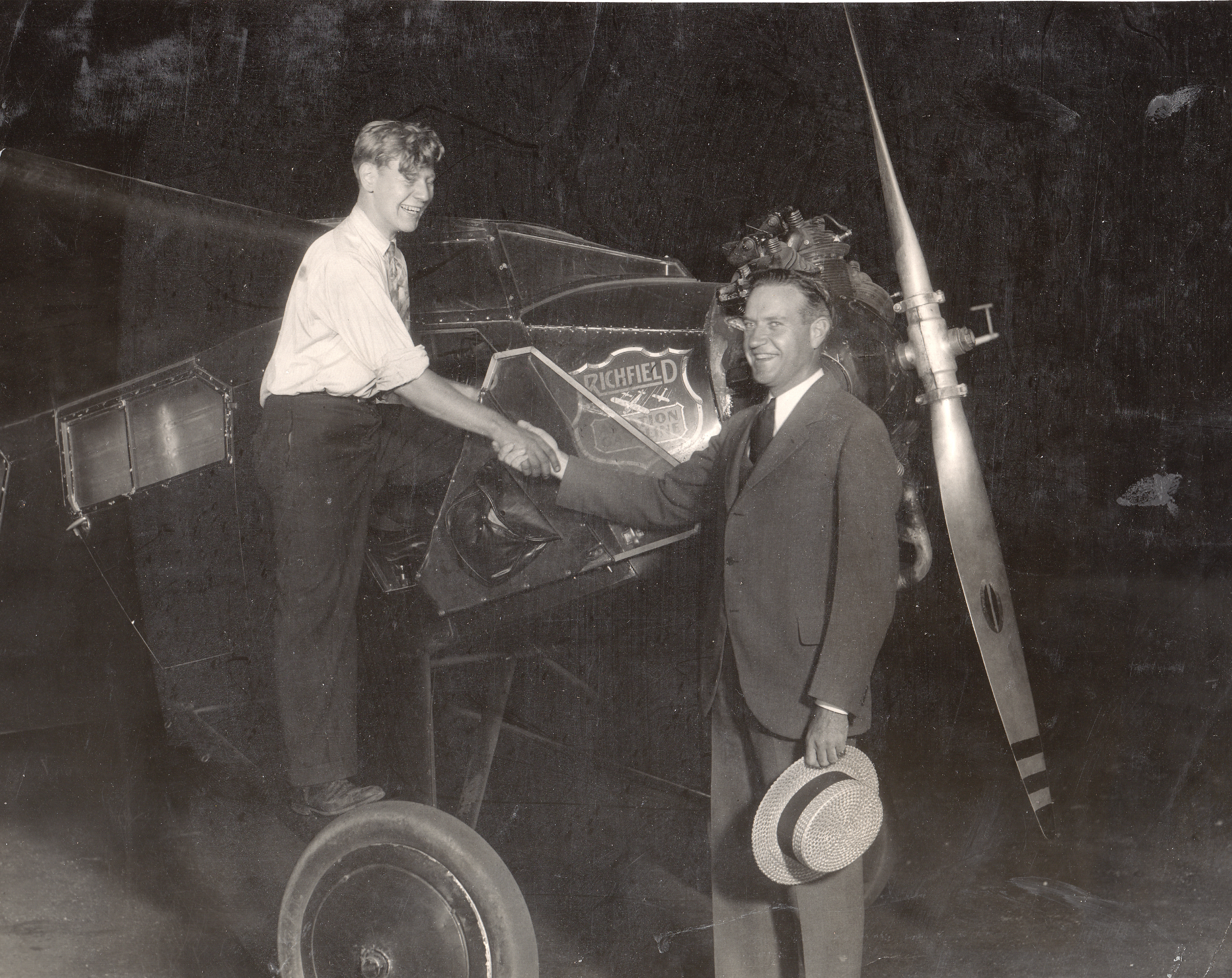
Eddie August Schneider shaking the hand of Richard Bronaugh Barnitz in Los Angeles, California, on August 21, 1930

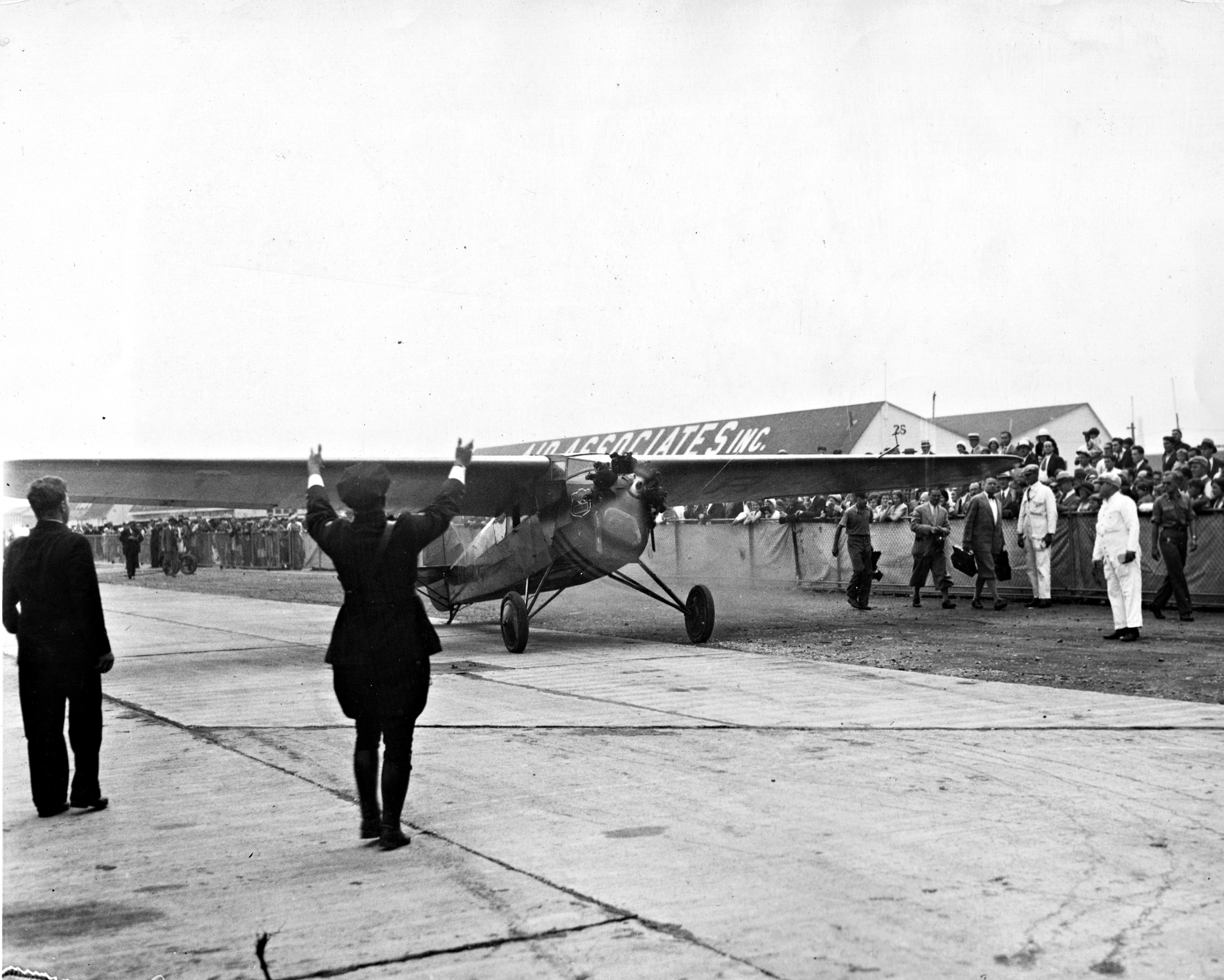
Schneider landing at Roosevelt Field on August 25, 1930, after completing round trip transcontinental flight

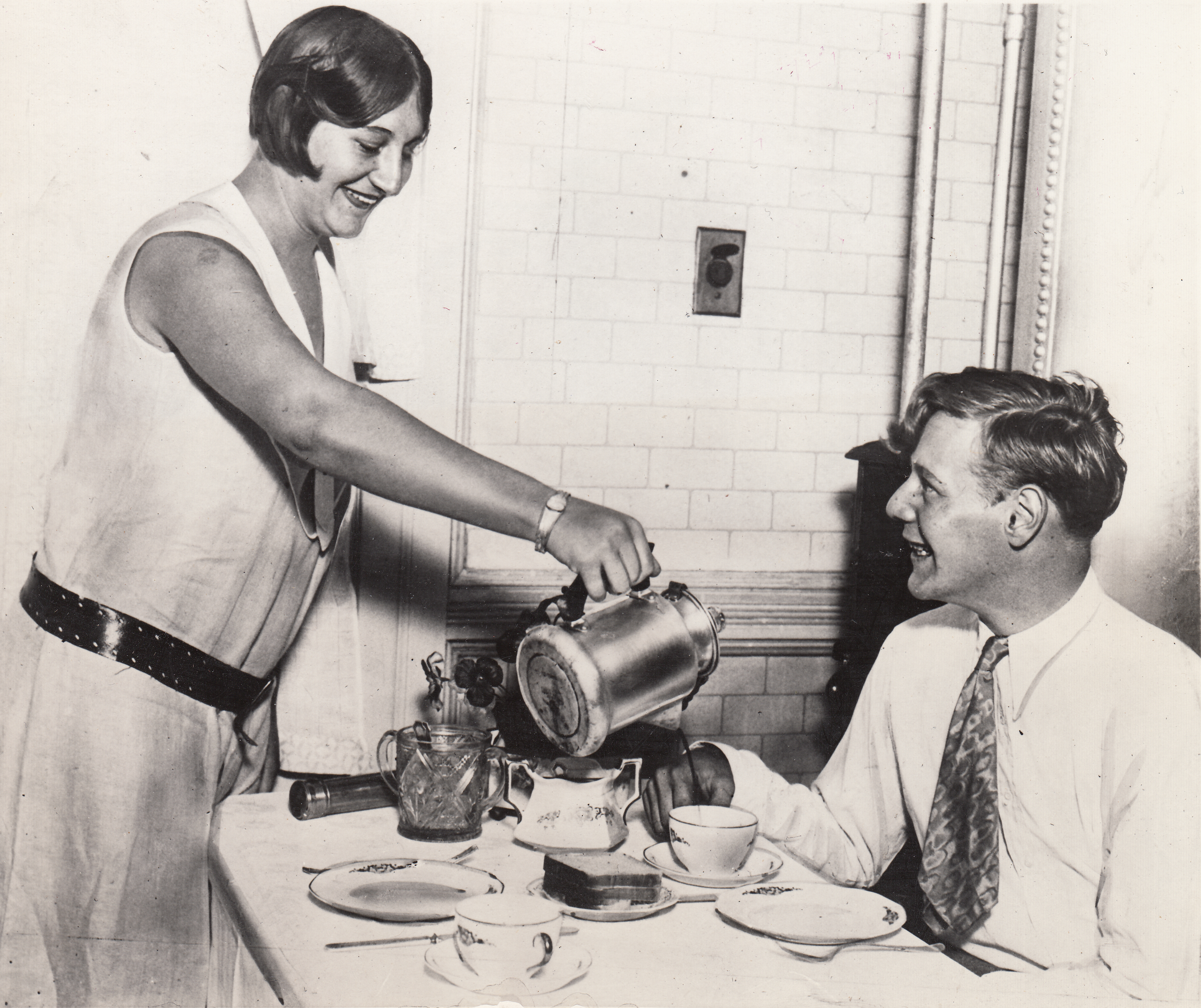
Schneider with a hot cup of coffee from his sister Alice Schneider Harms (1913–2002) on August 25, 1930

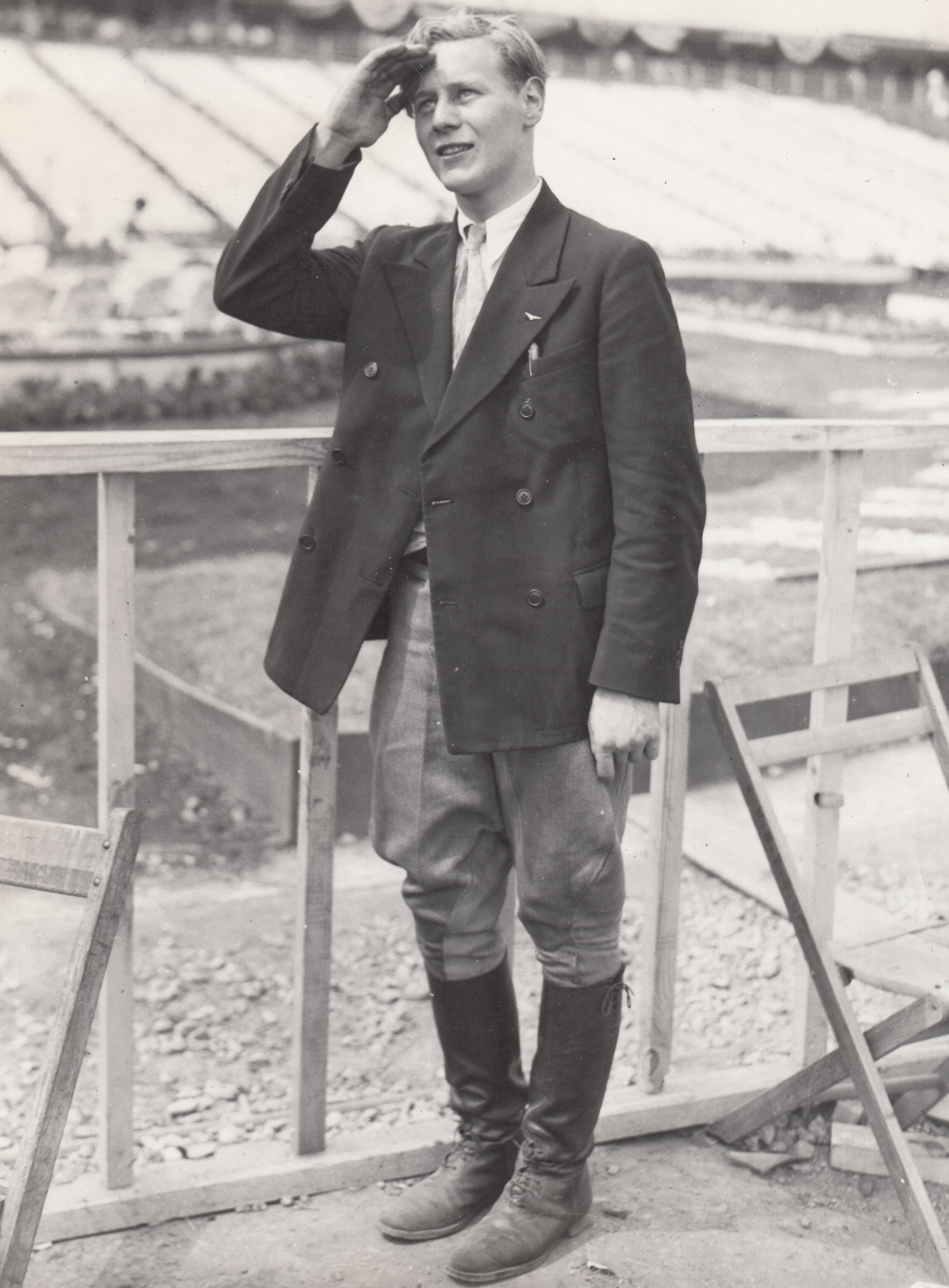
Schneider on August 26, 1930, in Chicago, Illinois, for the National Air Race

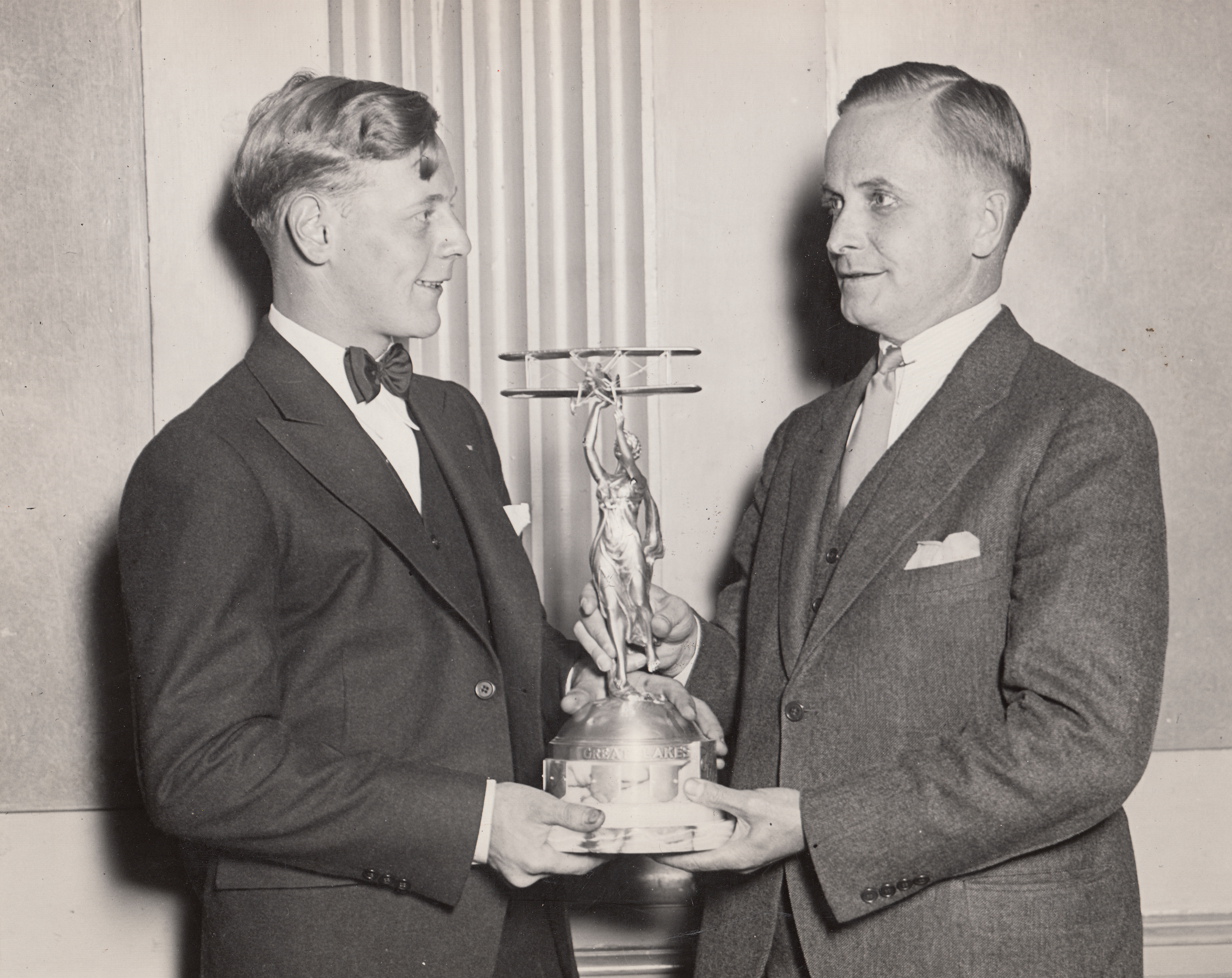
Schneider on September 27, 1930, accepting the Great Lakes Trophy in Detroit, Michigan, from David Vincent Stratton of the Great Lakes Aircraft Corporation

Eddie August Henry Schneider (October 20, 1911 – December 23, 1940) was an American aviator who set three transcontinental airspeed records for pilots under the age of twenty-one in 1930. His plane was a Cessna Model AW with a Warner-Scarab engine, one of only 48 built, that he called "The Kangaroo". He set the east-to-west, then the west-to-east, and the combined round trip record. He was the youngest certificated pilot in the United States, and the youngest certified airplane mechanic. He was a pilot in the Spanish Civil War in the Yankee Squadron. He died in an airplane crash in 1940, while training another pilot, when a Boeing-Stearman Model 75 belonging to the United States Navy Reserve overtook him and clipped his plane's tail at Floyd Bennett Field.

== Birth and family ==
Schneider was born on October 20, 1911, at 2nd Avenue and 17th Street in Manhattan in New York. His father was Emil August Schneider (1886–1955) who was born in Bielefeld, Germany. His mother was Inga Karoline Eldora Pedersen (1882–1927), who was born in Farsund, Norway. Eddie had one full sibling: Alice Violetta Schneider (1913–2002) who married John Harms (1905–1985). He was never called Edward, he was baptized as "Eddie Auguste Henry Schneider" on November 12, 1911, at Our Saviour's Lutheran Church in Queens, New York City.

== Early years ==
The family moved from Manhattan to Red Bank, New Jersey, and then to Jersey City, New Jersey, by 1920 where his father owned a delicatessen. Eddie attended William L. Dickinson High School and dropped out of school in 1926, at age 15 to go to work as a plane mechanic at Roosevelt Field in Hempstead, Long Island. His mother died In 1927 after which he, his father, and sister visited Bielefeld and Farsund to visit with relatives. In Germany Eddie went on a plane ride from Hamburg to Hanover and then aviation became his obsession. In 1928–1929 he trained at Roosevelt Field on Long Island and became the youngest person in the United States to receive a commercial pilot certificate. That same year he also received a mechanics certificate, becoming the youngest certificated airplane mechanic in New York. In April 1930 Eddie was living in Hempstead, Long Island with Carl Schneider (1898–?) who was also working as a mechanic. Eddie's father bought him a used, red, 1927 Cessna Model AW monoplane with tail number C9092. It already had been flown five hundred thousand air miles. He called it "the kangaroo".

== Transcontinental air speed record ==
Eddie reported that he intended to fly to the Pacific coast and back on July 30, 1930. On August 25, 1930, he set the round-trip transcontinental air speed record for pilots under the age of twenty-one years in his Cessna using a Warner Scarab engine. The trip was sponsored by Richfield Oil. He flew from Westfield, New Jersey, on August 14, 1930, to Los Angeles, California, in 4 days with a combined flying time of 29 hours and 55 minutes. He lowered the East to West record by 4 hours and 22 minutes. He then made the return trip from Los Angeles to Roosevelt Airfield in New York in 27 hours and 19 minutes, lowering the West to East record by 1 hour and 36 minutes. His total elapsed time for the round trip was 57 hours and 14 minutes, breaking the preceding record for the round trip. Frank Herbert Goldsborough held the previous record which was 62 hours and 58 minutes. When Eddie landed in New York on August 25, 1930, his first words were to his father: "Hello Pop, I made it." He was carrying letters from the Mayor John Clinton Porter of Los Angeles, to Mayor Frank Hague of Jersey City. Combined he set three records.

== Air tours ==
After setting the transcontinental speed record he entered in the 1930 Ford National Reliability Air Tour in Chicago, which ran from August 23, 1930, to September 1, 1930. He won the Great Lakes Trophy. Nancy Hopkins also flew in the tour that year. In 1931 Eddie participated in, what was the last Ford National Reliability Air Tour, in his Cessna. A defect in his engine forced a landing while flying over a mountainous section of Kentucky. He made a forced landing in a corn patch on the side of the mountain. A new engine was sent to him and after a difficult takeoff, he went on to win first place for single engine aircraft, and finished third overall.

Time wrote:

Sensation of the meet was the youngster Eddie Schneider, 19, who fell into last place by a forced landing of his Cessna and a three-day delay in Kentucky, then fought his way back to finish third, ahead of all other light planes.

During one of the National Air Tours, Schneider had taken off in his Cessna with the Warner Scarab engine, from Chicago bound for the balloon races in Cleveland. He saw the crowd scatter below, looked up and saw the 40-foot left wing of a twenty passenger Burnelli transport plane directly over him. Passengers in the Burnelli scrambled to the other side of the cabin to tilt the wing back up. Schneider sent his plane diving just as the Burnelli's wing scraped his plane's wing. A crash was averted by his dip. The officials said his quick action in dipping his plane close to the ground and then pulling clear of the grandstand had probably averted the most serious accident in the races.

== Marriage ==
In 1932 he went to work for the Hoover Air League as co-director of the Aviation Division. He married Gretchen Frances Hahnen (1902–1986) in New York City on June 2, 1934, at the New York Municipal Building in Manhattan. Gretchen was the daughter of Zora Montgomery Courtney (1882–1962) and was originally from Peoria, Illinois. Her father was Herman F. Hahnen from Des Moines, Iowa. She was a member the Jersey City Young Women's Christian Association (YWCA) and was director of the Aviation Club of The Jersey Journal, and the editor of the Junior Club Magazine. Eddie met her at an aviation function. They did not have any children.

== Jersey City Airport ==
Starting on January 1, 1935, Eddie leased the Jersey City Airport and ran his flying school from there until the field was converted into a sports stadium using WPA money. Eddie was taking off in a Travel Air three-seat, open-cockpit biplane with his student, Fred Weigel (1904–1990), when the motor died. From an altitude of 100 feet they crashed into Newark Bay, but were unhurt and were able to walk ashore. He also taught Herbert Sargent to fly with just 55 minutes in lessons.

== Spanish Civil War ==
In 1936, Eddie left for Spain to fly in the Yankee Squadron for the Spanish Loyalists in the Spanish Civil War with Frederic Ives Lord, Bertrand Blanchard Acosta, and Gordon Berry. They were recruited by a lawyer in New York City. Time magazine wrote on December 21, 1936: "Hilariously celebrating in the ship's bar of the Normandie with their first advance pay checks from Spain's Radical Government, six able U.S. aviators were en route last week for Madrid to join Bert Acosta, pilot of Admiral Byrd's transatlantic flight, in doing battle against Generalissimo Francisco Franco's White planes." He was promised he would be paid $1,500 ($33,594 today) each month and given a bonus of $1,000 ($22,396 today) for every rebel plane he shot down.

Another American flyer, Hilaire du Berrier, was already is Spain by time they arrived. Frederic Ives Lord became their squadron commander, and he tried to convince the Loyalist authorities that the planes they were given were too dilapidated to fly. When the commandant insisted that the planes were safe, Lord took him up for a test flight, and at two thousand feet up one of the four wings broke off. The commandant motioned Lord to climb higher so they could escape by using their parachutes. Lord wanted to try to land with the remaining lower wings intact. He landed the plane safely but he was arrested and was going to be shot. The airplane mechanics intervened and explained that his loss of the wing was accidental, not intentional. Things became so difficult and dangerous for the Americans that each time one of them landed they pulled out their pistols in case someone was coming to arrest them. They went to Valencia, Spain to complain to the air ministry, but the ministry was only interested in reading to the flyers the reports on Bertrand Blanchard Acosta and his heavy drinking. Berry, Lord, Acosta and Schneider decided it was time to demobilize and return to the United States. Acosta, Schneider and Lord planned to escape from Bilbao to Biarritz, France, by motorboat after they had been refused a promised Christmas leave. Their plan was discovered and the pilot of their boat was arrested and executed. The pilots were then jailed for 18 hours.

On returning to New York City in January 1937, Schneider claimed he was never paid in full. Spain claimed that they were paid in full, and were not owed any money. Others who flew for the loyalists included: Bert Acosta, Gordon Berry, and Frederic Ives Lord. When he returned he was questioned by Chief Assistant United States Attorney, John F. Dailey on January 15, 1937, in New York. Eddie's lawyer was Colonel Lewis Landes. On January 20, 1937, Eddie, Bert, and Gordon flew to Washington, D.C., and had to testify again. When talking to reporters Eddie said:

I was broke, hungry, jobless... yet despite the fact that all three of us are old-time aviators who did our part for the development of the industry, we were left out in the cold in the Administration's program of job making. Can you blame us for accepting the lucrative Spanish offer?

He later said "This was a mess... and there was always that never-ending jockeying for the power among the factions to contend with, it got to the point where we did not know who we were fighting and why, and you can say that we are damn glad to be back." The flyers had their passports confiscated, and they were to be returned when they attested that they had never forsworn allegiance to America.

== Middle years ==
In 1938 Eddie stood at 5-foot, 8 inches (68 inches) and weighed 160 pounds (73 kg). He had blue eyes and blond hair, and he was living at 38 Broadway in Manhattan. Eddie began work for American Airlines at Newark Airport in New Jersey, he then moved to Jackson Heights, Queens on Long Island, when the American Airlines eastern terminal had moved to LaGuardia Airport. Eddie registered for the draft on October 16, 1940, when he was living at 32–50 73rd Street in Jackson Heights, Queens in New York.

== Death ==
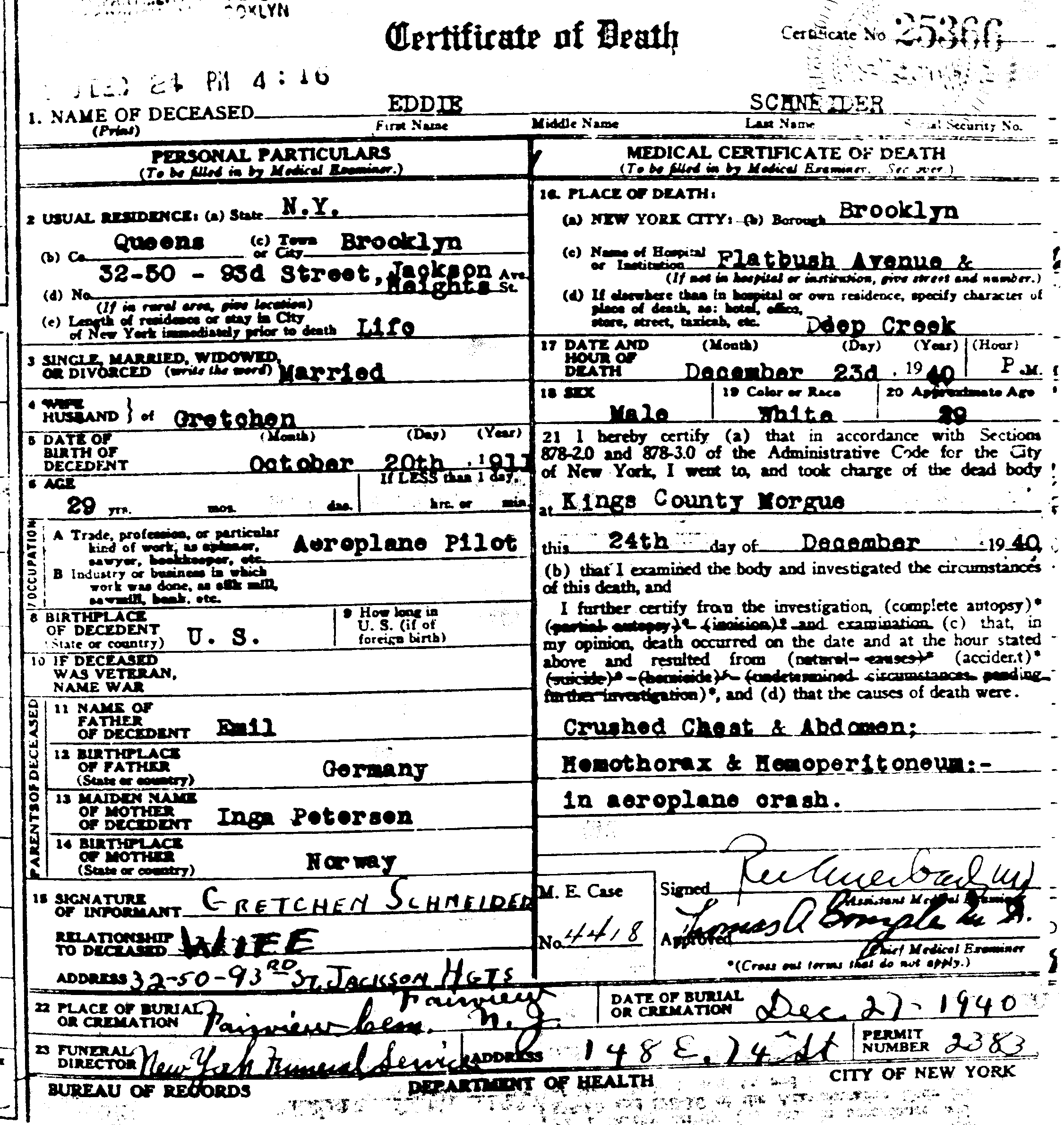
Eddie August Schneider's (1911–1940) death certificate, issued in New York.

On December 23, 1940, around 1:25 pm, Eddie was killed in an accident at Floyd Bennett Field at age 29, while training George Wilson Herzog (1903–1940). They were flying at about 600 feet, about to land, when United States Navy Reserve pilot Kenneth A. Kuehner, age 25, of Minster, Ohio, struck the tail assembly of Eddie's plane with his Boeing-Stearman Model 75. Eddie's plane went into a spin and crashed into Deep Creek, just off of Flatbush Avenue. Both Herzog and Schneider were dead at the scene of impact. The bodies were taken to King's County Hospital, and Eddie's cause of death was listed as "crushed chest & abdomen; hemothorax & hemoperitoneum in aeroplane crash". The accident was investigated by the Civil Aeronautics Board (CAB) and Kuehner was ruled at fault for flying too low and failing to observe the traffic in front of him. The air traffic controllers were also chastised. The United States House of Representatives reported the accident as follows on November 7, 1941:

It appears that on December 23, 1940, a private plane piloted by Eddie Schneider was struck by a Navy plane, piloted by Ensign Kenneth A. Kuehner, United States Naval Reserve, in the vicinity of Floyd Bennett Field, Brooklyn, N. Y., causing the death of Eddie Schneider and completely demolishing his plane. The evidence indicates that the first contact of the Navy plane with the private plane was when its propeller cut through the tail of the private plane and cut the tail completely off. This was confirmed by the fact that the tail surfaces of the private plane were found later to have been completely severed and by markings found on the propeller of the Navy plane. After the propeller of the Navy plane severed the tail surfaces, the private plane pulled ahead for an instant. The Navy plane swung slightly then overtook the private plane, again cutting one of its wings causing it to immediately spin to the waters below. An inspection of the Navy plane revealed that the leading edges of both blades of the propeller had been gouged and nicked, apparently at the time the ...

== Widow ==
In 1941 Gretchen appealed to Congress to pay for the funeral, which totaled $365. On February 13, 1942, Gretchen again appealed to Congress for financial relief with HR 5290. Around 1953–1954 Gretchen donated Schneider's books to the Smithsonian Institution and they are now housed at the National Air and Space Museum. In 1961 she was given an award by the Early Fliers Club of Long Island.

== Aircraft ==
- 1927 Cessna Model AW called "the Kangaroo". It was originally painted red and by January 1931 was painted in the Richfield Oil Corporation colors of blue and cream. "We named the ship the Kangaroo, because we hoped I could get to California in a couple of jumps."

== Major air races ==
- 1930 Ford National Reliability Air Tour (National Air Tour) Detroit, Michigan; Plane number 21. Great Lakes Trophy, and eighth place overall.
- 1931 Ford National Reliability Air Tour (National Air Tour) Detroit, Michigan; Plane number 17. First place for single engine planes, third place overall.

== Junior transcontinental air speed record holders ==
- 1930 Frank Herbert Goldsborough.
- 1930 Eddie August Schneider.
- 1930 Robert Nietzel Buck.

Ancestors of Eddie August Schneider

8.
4. August Schneider
9.
2. Emil August Schneider
10.
5. Henriette Horlomann
11.
1. Eddie August Schneider
12. Peder Andreas Hansen
6. Peder Andreas Pedersen
13. Maren Sofie Olsdatter
3. Inga Caroline Eldora Petersen
14.
7. Serine Larsdatter
15.

== 1930 transcontinental itinerary ==
- Westfield, New Jersey; departure: August 14, 1930, 5:55 am, Eastern Daylight Time.
- Williamsburg, Pennsylvania; departure: August 15, 1930, 12:30 pm.
- Columbus, Ohio, departure: August 15, 1930, 3:21 pm.
- St. Louis, Missouri; arrival: August 15, 1930 7:05 pm, Central Standard Time; departure: August 16, 1930, 1:25 pm; elapsed time: 8 hours 38 minutes.
- Wichita, Kansas; arrival: August 16, 1930, 7:45 pm.
- Santa Rosa, New Mexico, aka Anton Chico, New Mexico.
- Albuquerque, New Mexico; arrival: August 18, 1930, 5:55 am, Mountain Standard Time; departure: August 18, 1930, 7:40 am, Mountain Standard Time.
- Los Angeles, California; arrival: August 19, 1930; departure: August 21, 1930, 6:17:30 am, Pacific Standard Time (elapsed flying time of 29 hours and 55 minutes from New Jersey to California).
- Albuquerque, New Mexico; arrival: August 21, 1930, 3:13 pm Mountain Time
- Columbus, Ohio; arrival: August 23, 1930, 3:35 p.m. (Eastern Standard Time); departure: August 24, 1930, ~8:00 a.m.
- Roosevelt Field, Long Island in Garden City, New York; arrival August 25, 1930, 4:03 pm, est; elapsed time: 27 hours and 19 minutes, lowering the West to East record by 1 hour and 36 minutes. His total elapsed time for the round trip was 57 hours and 14 minutes.
- Chicago, Illinois (to attend National Air Races).

== See also ==
- 1930 in aviation
- 1940 in aviation
- List of fatalities from aviation accidents

== Archive ==
- The Gretchen Black collection at the George H. Williams, World War I Aviation Library at the University of Texas at Dallas contains Eddie's certificates, letters, diary, photographs, and the beret he wore in the Spanish Civil War. They were originally donated by his widow to the Institute of Aeronautical Sciences in New York City, they were transferred to, and now archived at the University of Texas at Dallas. They also archived his New York car registration and NJ driver's license; his TWA Courtesy Card; 1940 Selective Service card; and 1942 FCC certificate.
- The Naida Muriel Freudenberg (1915–1998) collection had the December 14, 1930, newspaper article on the planned but never started trip around the world.
- The Associated Press has a single photo that was used by The New York Times for his obituary.
- New York State Vital Records provided the death certificate.
- The Eddie A. Schneider Memorial Library consists of 67 books, 35 pamphlets, and a painting are housed at the National Air and Space Museum at the Smithsonian Institution in Washington, D.C. The material was donated by his widow, Gretchen Frances Hahnen (1902–1986), while she was living in Fort Worth, Texas. They also have two photos.
- Footage of his landing from Universal Newsreel does not appear in their archive. The 1930 newsreels have been transferred to DVD and indexed for August 18, 1930, and November 6, 1930, but the two weeks in between is either no longer extant, or wasn't transferred. The March of Time does not have any footage based on a search in their index.
- The Civil Aeronautics Board (CAB) has the original report of the investigation of the crash.
- The Henry Ford archive has images of Eddie Schneider from the 1930–1931 Ford National Reliability Air Tour.
- The Congressional Record has his widow's appeal to have the United States government reimburse her for her husband's funeral expenses.

== References and notes ==
Preceded by Frank Goldsborough	Junior Transcontinental Airspeed Record; 1930	Succeeded by Robert Nietzel Buck
