= Lewis Landes =

American lawyer (1891–1972)

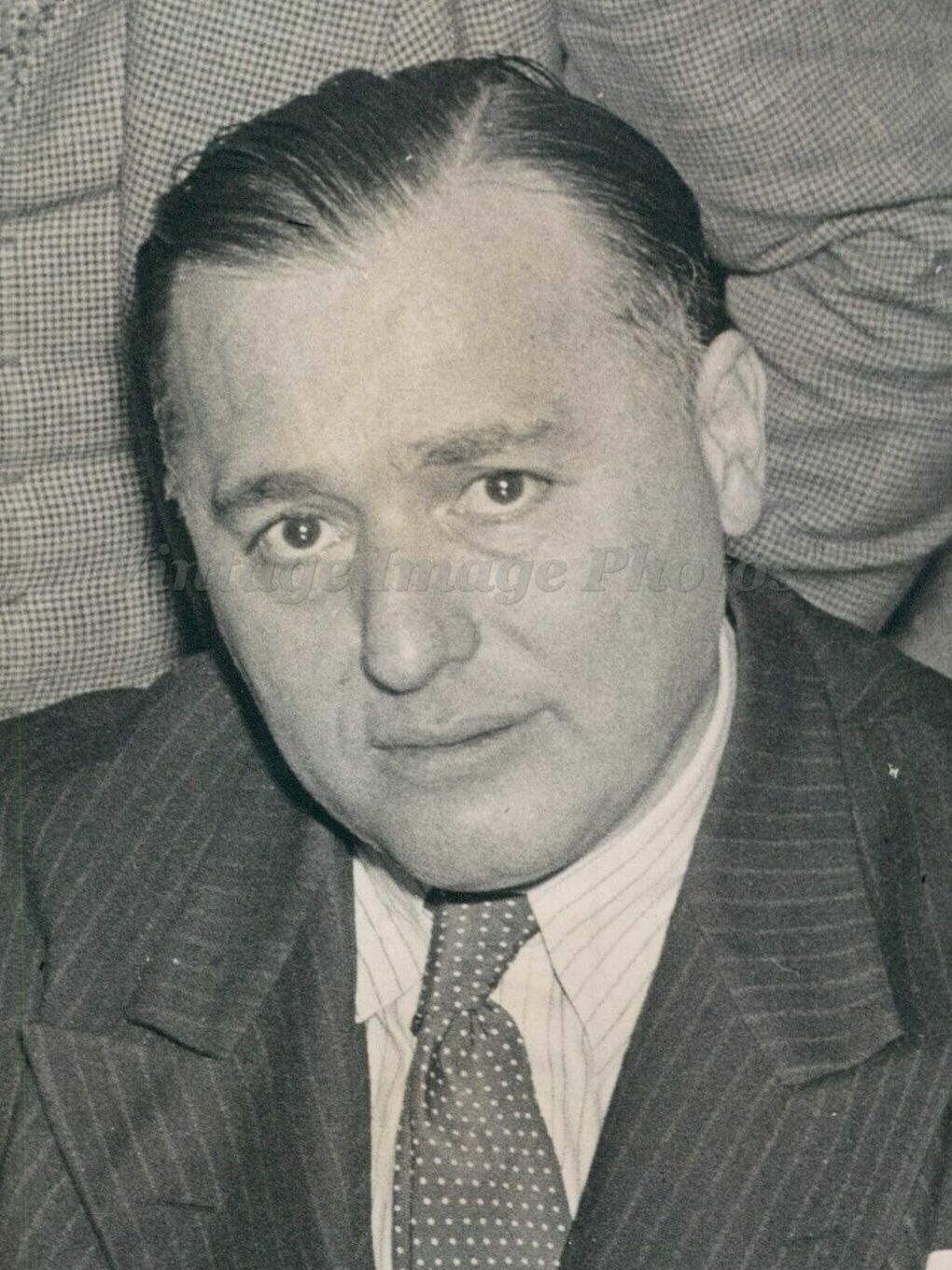
- Picture of Lewis Landes in 1939
- Born: December 12, 1891; New York City, New York
- Died: January 8, 1972 (aged 80)
- Education: University of Florida
- Occupations: US Army Colonel and Attorney
- Spouse: Kathryn G. Levy

Lewis Landes (December 12, 1891 – January 8, 1972) was a US Army Colonel and a lawyer.

== Early life ==
He was born on December 12, 1891, in New York City. He attended the University of Florida where he joined the Florida National Guard where he was sent to capture Pancho Villa.

He married Kathryn G. Levy (1893–1974) also known as "Kitty", around 1913 and had the following children: Sidney W. Landes (1914–2005); Leslie N. Landes (1922–2004) of Rye, New York; and Richard J. Landes (1927-2022 ) who worked for Hewlett-Packard and was with David Packard when he was Deputy Secretary of Defense in Washington, D.C.

In 1914 he was a member of the Jewish Soldiers and Sailors Passover Committee. During World War I he was with the American Expeditionary Forces and he may have served on the American Jewish Committee. In 1917 at age 26 he was promoted to colonel. At the end of the war he headed the Allied Reparations Committee.

== WGL ==
The WGL AM radio station first broadcast on January 30, 1927, from the Hotel Majestic, at Central Park West and 72nd Street. The station was owned by the International Broadcasting Corporation. Colonel Lewis Landes was the station president and he stated on the inaugural broadcast: "The International Broadcasting Corporation's aim is to adhere to truth, to be free of partisanship, religious or political." The station remained on the air for only 20 months before it went bankrupt.

== Legal career ==
Colonel Landes defended Eddie August Schneider in 1936, when Eddie returned from Spain where he flew in the Yankee Squadron for the Spanish Loyalists in the Spanish Civil War.

Landes was held in contempt in a case in the Southern District of New York, a finding which was affirmed on appeal.

Landes also appeared in several cases before the U.S. Supreme Court.

== Jockey Club ==
Around 1940 Colonel Lewis Landes, was asked to act as general counsel pro bono for the Jockeys Community Fund and Guild.

== World War II ==
During World War II he was sent to Australia, where he was the chief aide to Douglas MacArthur and was in charge of logistics and supplies. Most of the troops under his command were African American.

== Death ==
The Colonel donated a Greek vase to the Metropolitan Museum of Art. He died on January 8, 1972, at New Rochelle Hospital and was at living 1833 Palmer Avenue in Larchmont, New York.
