= Yankee Squadron =

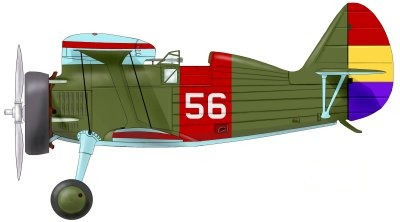
- The No. 56 Chato flown by F. G. Tinker
- Active: 1936–1937
- Country: United States
- Allegiance: Spain
- Branch: Spanish Republican Air Force
- Type: Air Force Squadron
- Size: 6

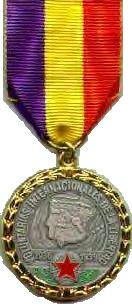
Spanish Civil War Medal awarded to the International Brigades

The Yankee Squadron was a group of mercenary American military aviators who flew for the Spanish Republican Air Force during the Spanish Civil War.

== History ==
In November 1936, representatives of the Second Spanish Republic (Spanish Republicans, or Loyalists) began a campaign to hire American pilots to fight in the Spanish Civil War. They used a New York lawyer to find American pilots. Time magazine reported on December 21, 1936, that six U.S. fliers were on the ocean liner SS Normandie, headed for Spain, to join their leader, Bert Acosta. They were to be paid $1,500 a month, plus $1,000 for each Aviación Nacional plane destroyed.

Time reported that the six men were: "[h]ilariously celebrating in the ship's bar of the Normandie with their first advance pay checks from Spain's Radical Government ... en route last week for Madrid to join Bert Acosta, pilot of Admiral Byrd's transatlantic flight, in doing battle against Generalissimo Francisco Franco's White planes."

British and French pilots were given two weeks of training, but the Americans were expected to fly as soon as they arrived. Another American flyer, Hilaire du Berrier, was already in Spain by time they arrived. Frederic Ives Lord became their squadron commander, and he tried to convince the Loyalist authorities that the planes they were given were too dilapidated to fly. When the commandant insisted that the planes were safe, Lord took him up for a test flight, and at two thousand feet up one of the four wings broke off. The commandant motioned Lord to climb higher so they could escape by using their parachutes. Lord wanted to try to land with the remaining lower wings intact. He landed the plane safely but was arrested at the airfield. An airplane mechanic intervened and explained that his loss of the wing was accidental, and was not intentional. The pilots went to Valencia, Spain to complain to the Second Spanish Republic air ministry, but nothing changed. Acosta, Schneider and Lord planned to escape from Bilbao to Biarritz, France by motorboat after they had been refused a promised Christmas leave. Their plan was discovered and the pilot of their boat was arrested and executed. The pilots were then jailed for 18 hours. They then returned to the United States.

== Return to United States ==
Four of them resigned and returned to the United States in January. The Associated Press reported that "the flyers protested they were given nothing but unarmed sports planes with which to fight, while Russian pilots were assigned "regular American army planes." The Spanish Air Force had no US-built planes; the main fighters used by the Republicans during the war were the Soviet-built Polikarpov I-15 and I-16. The latter was often mistaken for the Boeing P-26, but was not related to it. The flyers said both the socialist and fascist air forces in Spain were staffed almost entirely by foreigners.

The fliers later told the Washington Post that they had quit because "'it would be suicide to continue' and because their actions 'might not be in tune with the spirit of neutrality'... While other airmen – British and French – were afforded a two-week courtesy for training, American fliers were just shown to loyalist hangars, given a plane and ordered to do their stuff. 'We were flying old crates,' Acosta said, 'while other nationalists [sic] were given modern ships. But for the protection afforded us by Soviet pursuit planes we would not be alive now to tell you this tale.'"

Eddie August Schneider explained his motives in flying for the Republic: "I was broke, hungry, jobless ... yet despite the fact that all three of us are old-time aviators who did our part for the development of the industry, we were left out in the cold in the Administration's program of job making. Can you blame us for accepting the lucrative Spanish offer?" The flyers had their passports confiscated, and they were to be returned when they attested that they had never withdrawn their allegiance to the United States.

The flyers claimed that they were not paid what was promised them by the Spanish government. Acosta and Berry started legal proceedings against the Spanish steamship Mar Cantabrico to try to collect the back pay that was due each of them. The consul general for the Spanish government, Luis Careaga, arrived in the US and paid some of the money, and declared that they were now paid in full. Their lawyer, Lewis Landes, claimed Acosta and Berry were still owed $1,500 and Schneider $1,200.

== Members ==
- Bertrand Blanchard Acosta (1895–1954), co-pilot on America, the third candidate for the Orteig Prize(1927).
- Gordon Berry (1898–?), he is sometimes listed as "George F. Berry" or "Gordon K. Berry" or "Gordon O. Berry". He was a 39-year-old flying and drinking companion of Bert Acosta, who served in the RAF towards the end of World War I. He was from New York.
- Frederic Ives Lord (1897–1967), a.k.a. Frank I. Frederick Lord
- Eddie August Schneider (1911–1940)
- Eddie Semons, sometimes listed as "Edwin Semons" or "Edwin L. Semons". He may have helped recruit other pilots.
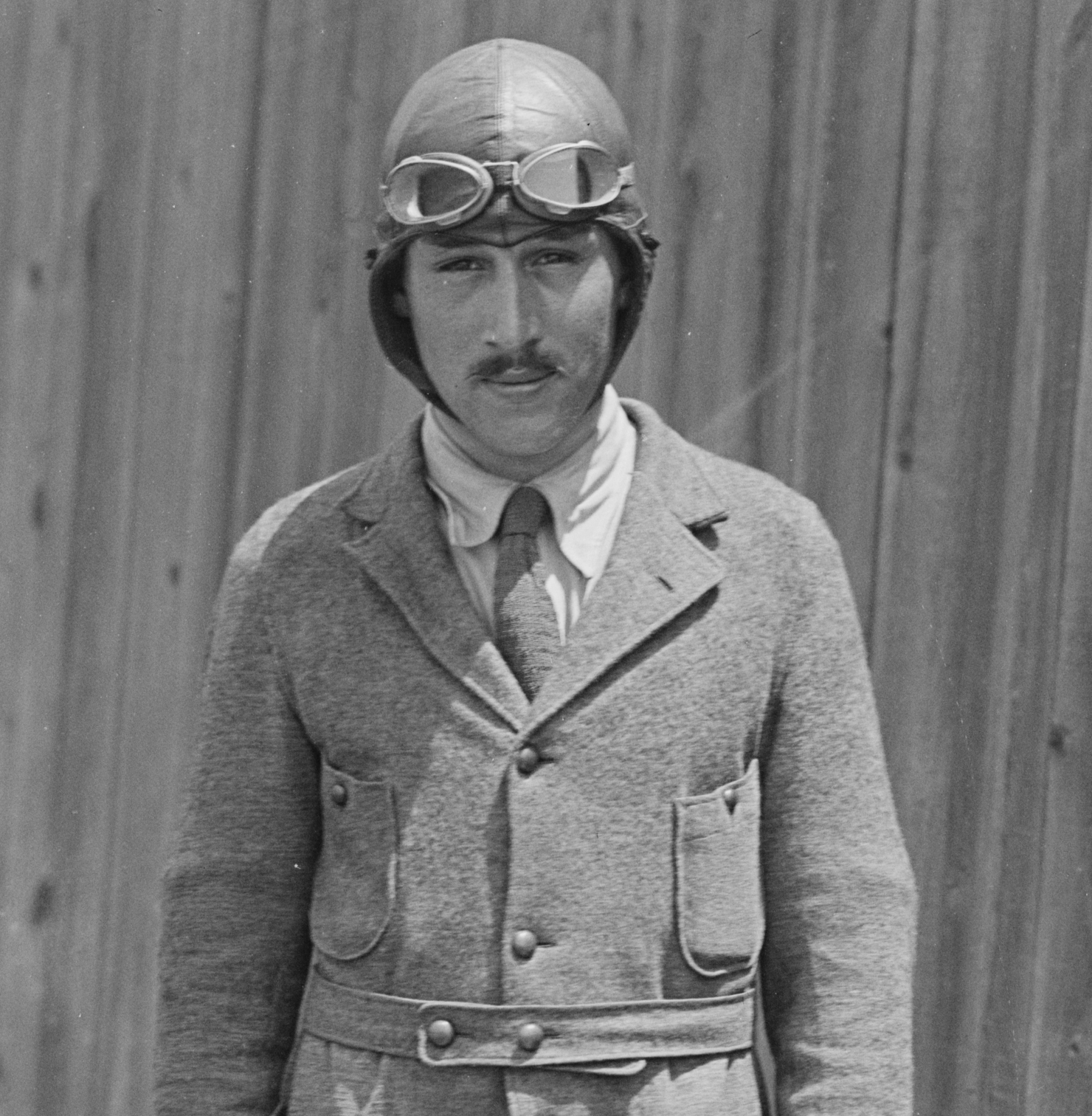
Acosta

Lord

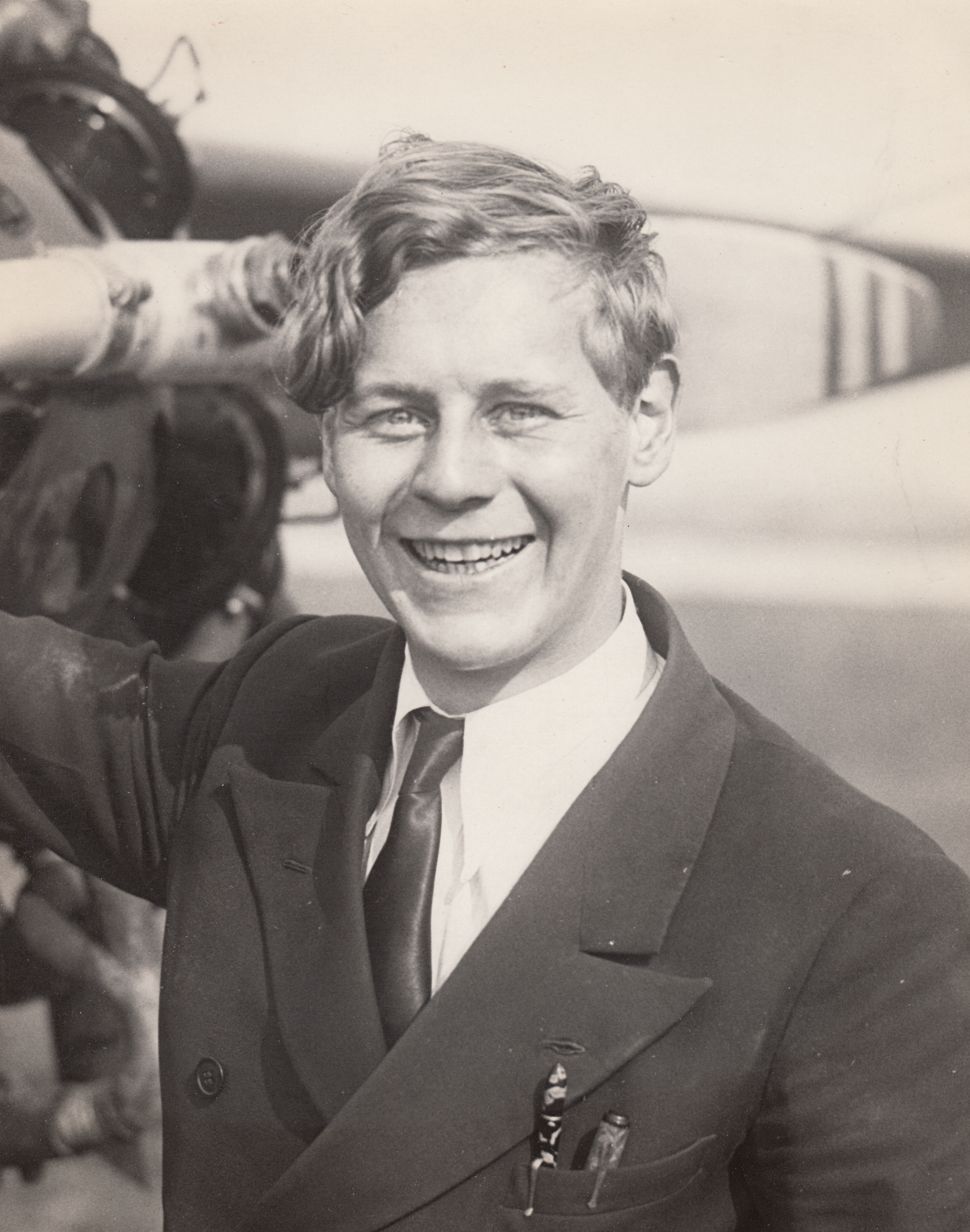
Schneider

== See also ==
- Spanish Republican Air Force
- Frank Glasgow Tinker, fighter pilot for the Spanish Republican Air Force
- Lincoln Battalion
- XV International Brigade
