= Hoover League =

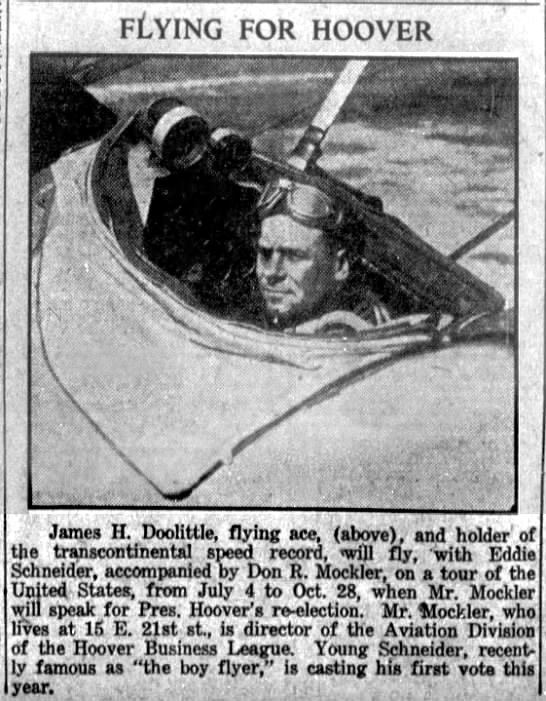
James Harold Doolittle of the Hoover Air League

The National Hoover for President League was established in the United States in 1928 and existed through the 1930s.

The Republican National Committee founded the organization in 1928. Soon after its creation it was disavowed by the Republican National Committee and investigated by United States Postal Inspection Service and a federal grand jury.

== Divisions ==
- Hoover Business League
- Hoover Air League, run by Don Ryan Mockler and Eddie August Schneider
