= Bert Acosta =

American aviator (1895–1954)

Bertrand Blanchard Acosta
- Acosta circa 1927
- Born: January 1, 1895; San Diego, California, U.S.
- Died: September 1, 1954 (aged 59); Denver, Colorado, U.S.
- Resting place: Portal of Folded Wings
- Education: Throop Polytechnic Institute
- Occupations: Aviator, Test pilot
- Spouses: Mary Louise Brumley (m. 1918; div. 1920) Helen Belmont Pearsoll (m. 1921)
- Children: Bertina Dolores Acosta (1918–1970) Saranto; Gloria Consuelo Acosta (b. 1919); Bertrand Blanchard Acosta, Jr. (1922–1993); Allyn Lee Acosta (1924–1997)
- Parent(s): Miguel Aphonse Ferdinand Acosta; Martha Blanche Reilly-Snook

Bertrand Blanchard Acosta (January 1, 1895 – September 1, 1954) was a record-setting aviator and test pilot. He and Clarence D. Chamberlin set an endurance record of 51 hours, 11 minutes, and 25 seconds in the air. He later flew in the Spanish Civil War in the Yankee Squadron. He was known as the "bad boy of the air". He received numerous fines and suspensions for flying stunts such as flying under bridges or flying too close to buildings.

== Early life ==
Acosta was born in San Diego, California, to Miguel Aphonse Ferdinand Acosta and Martha Blanche Reilly-Snook. He attended the Throop Polytechnic Institute in Pasadena, California, from 1912 to 1914.

He taught himself to fly in August 1910 and built experimental airplanes up until 1912 when he began work for Glenn Curtiss as an apprentice on a hydroplane project. In 1915 he worked as a flying instructor. He went to Canada and worked as an instructor for the Royal Flying Corps and Royal Naval Air Service in Toronto. In 1917 he was appointed chief instructor, Aviation Section, U.S. Signal Corps at Hazelhurst Field, Long Island where he test flew early open-cockpit aircraft such as the Continental KB-1 over New York in below freezing conditions.

Acosta married Mary Louise Brumley (1886–1962) in 1918 but they divorced in 1920. He won The Pulitzer Trophy Race in 1921 and the same year set an airspeed record of 176.9 miles an hour. In 1922 he served as a test pilot for the Stout Batwing Limousine, Stout's forerunner to the Ford Trimotor. In 1925 he was a lieutenant in the U.S. Navy and was living at 1 Winslow Court in Naugatuck, Connecticut. He married Helen Belmont Pearsoll, on August 3, 1921. They eventually separated but never divorced.

== Endurance record ==
In April 1927, he and Clarence D. Chamberlin set an endurance record of 51 hours, 11 minutes, and 25 seconds in the air. Time magazine reported on April 25, 1927:

Engineer Giuseppe M. Bellanca of the Columbia Aircraft Corporation had conditioned an elderly yellow-winged monoplane with one Wright motor, and scouted around for pilots. Lieut. Leigh Wade, round-the-world flyer, declined the invitation, saying Mr. Bellanca's plans were too stunt-like, not scientific. Shrugging, Mr. Bellanca engaged Pilots Clarence Duncan Chamberlin and burly Bert Acosta, onetime auto speedster, to test his ship's endurance. Up they put from Mitchel Field, Long Island, with 385 gallons of ethylated (high power) gasoline. All day they droned back and forth over suburbia, circled the Woolworth Building, hovered over Hadley Field, New Jersey, swung back to drop notes on Mitchel Field. All that starry night they wandered slowly around the sky, and all the next day, and through the next night, a muggy, cloudy one. Newsgatherers flew up alongside to shout unintelligible things through megaphones. Messrs. Acosta and Chamberlain were looking tired and oil-blobbed. They swallowed soup and sandwiches, caught catnaps on the mattressed fuel tank, while on and on they droned, almost lazily (about 80 m.p.h.) for they were cruising against time. Not for 51 hours, 11 minutes, 25 seconds, did they coast to earth, having broken the U.S. and world's records for protracted flight. In the same time, conditions favoring, they could have flown from Manhattan to Vienna. They had covered 4,100 miles. To Paris it is 3,600 miles from Manhattan. Jubilant, Engineer Bellanca's employers offered competitors a three-hour headstart in the race to Paris. The Bellanca monoplane's normal cruising speed is 110 m.p.h. She would require only some 35 hours to reach Paris—if she could stay up that long again.

== Orteig Prize attempt ==
Columbia Aircraft Corp president Charles Levine planned on using Clarence Chamberlin or Bert Acosta as pilot with Lloyd W. Bertaud as copilot on their attempt at the Orteig Prize in the Wright-Bellanca WB-2 Columbia. Levine bumped Bertaud from the copilot position, prompting an injunction preventing any Orteig record flight. Charles Lindbergh arrived on May 5, 1927. While Chamberlin waited for the injunction to be lifted, his other competition, Admiral Byrd's team was repairing his Fokker C-2 Trimotor, the "America" after a practice run crash. On May 20–21, 1927, Lindbergh left Roosevelt Field and crossing the Atlantic, while leaving the 'Columbia' and 'Atlantic' behind at the adjacent Curtiss Field.

== Transatlantic flight ==
On June 29, 1927, thirty-three days after Charles Lindbergh's record setting transatlantic flight, Acosta flew from Roosevelt Field on Long Island to France with Commander Richard E. Byrd, Lieutenant George O. Noville and Bernt Balchen aboard the America. A short film of Acosta, Byrd, George Noville, and Grover Whalen giving a farewell speech was filmed in the Phonofilm sound-on-film process on June 29 and released as America's Flyers. During the flight, the (perhaps apocryphal) story was that Byrd had to hit Acosta over the head with a fire extinguisher or a flashlight when he got out of control from drinking during their flight.

== Bad boy persona ==
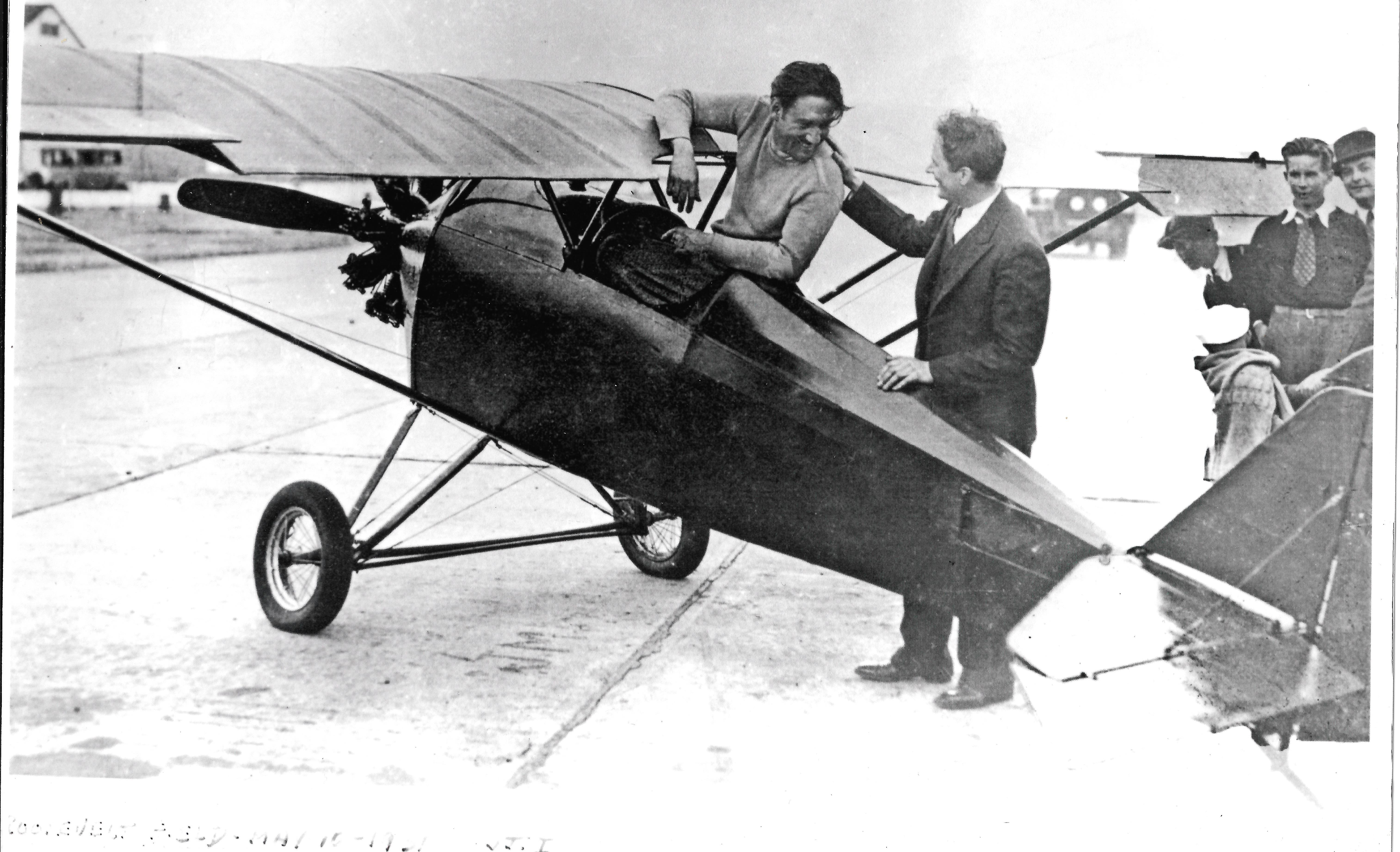
Acosta (left) with Joseph Terleph in c. 1931 following the successful first flight of the Terle Sportplane

In 1928 Connecticut suspended his pilot license for trying to fly under the Whittemore Memorial Bridge in Naugatuck. According to local Naugatuck tradition, the wing span of his aircraft was much longer than the width of the center arch of the bridge. The flight may have been a publicity stunt, as there was an advertisement for Splitdorf Spark Plugs on the fuselage.

In 1929 he was fined $500 for low flying and stunting. When he failed to pay the fine, the Department of Commerce revoked his pilot license. He was arrested by Connecticut State troopers in 1930 for flying without a license.

A new Terle Sportplane was being tested at Roosevelt Field in New York in 1931, but the CAA did not register it as a licensed aircraft. The aircraft was later test flown by Acosta, who found it perfect for his use since he was currently grounded from flying licensed aircraft from a previous infraction. After performing aerobatics with the aircraft to a large crowd, Acosta and designer Joseph Terle planned to produce the aircraft together as the "Acosterle Wild Cet". The aircraft was test flown for two years, but could not meet certification requirements.

In 1931 he planned to fly from New York to Honduras with Captain Lisandro Garay of the Honduran Air Force in a Bellanca CH-300. Acosta disappeared before a fully loaded "test flight" with 360 gallons of gasoline. Instead, Garay departed from Floyd Bennett Field without him, making it as far as Cape Hatteras, NC, where due to a storm he was forced to land at sea.

== Spanish Civil War ==
In 1936 Acosta was head of the Yankee Squadron in the Spanish Civil War with Eddie August Schneider and Frederic Ives Lord.

Time magazine wrote on December 21, 1936:

Hilariously celebrating in the ship's bar of the Normandie with their first advance pay checks from Spain's Radical Government, six able U.S. aviators were en route last week for Madrid to join Bert Acosta, pilot of Admiral Byrd's transatlantic flight, in doing battle against Generalísimo Francisco Franco's White planes. Payment for their services: $1,500 a month plus $1,000 for each White plane brought down.

Time magazine wrote on January 4, 1937, although the attack was later determined to be propaganda:

On Christmas Eve the "Yankee Squadron" of famed U.S. aviators headed by Bert Acosta, pilot of Admiral Byrd's transatlantic flight, at the last minute abandoned plans for a whoopee party with their wives at Biarritz, swank French resort across the Spanish frontier. They decided that they would rather raid Burgos, Generalísimo Franco's headquarters. The hundreds of incendiary bombs that they dropped on White hangars and munition dumps they jokingly described as "Messages of Christmas Cheer for the boys in Burgos."

== Death ==
In December 1951 Acosta collapsed in a New York City bar and was hospitalized with tuberculosis. He died at the Jewish Consumptive's Relief Society sanatorium in Colorado in 1954. He was 59. Acosta was buried at the Portal of the Folded Wings Shrine to Aviation at Valhalla Memorial Park Cemetery in North Hollywood, California.

== Legacy ==
In 2014, Acosta was posthumously inducted into the National Aviation Hall of Fame, along with pilot and astronaut James McDivitt, the first female airline captain Emily Warner, Cirrus founders and designers Dale and Alan Klapmeier, and homebuilt aircraft racer and engineer Steve Wittman.

== See also ==
- Flight airspeed record

Preceded by Clarence Duncan Chamberlin	Transatlantic flight 1927	Succeeded by James Fitzmaurice
