= Frederic Ives Lord =

- circa 1918–1920
- Born: April 18, 1897; Manitowoc, Wisconsin, United States
- Died: July 21, 1967 (aged 70); Apple Valley, California
- Burial place: Victor Valley Memorial Park, Victorville, California
- Military career
- Allegiance: United States; United Kingdom; Spanish Republic
- Branch: Royal Air Force; Republican Air Force
- Rank: Captain
- Units: No. 79 Squadron RAF; Yankee Squadron
- Conflicts: World War I Russian Civil War; Mexican Revolution; Spanish Civil War; World War II
- Awards: Distinguished Flying Cross; Order of Saint Stanislas

Frederic Ives Lord (April 18, 1897 – July 21, 1967) or sometimes Frederick Ives Lord, was a captain, a World War I flying ace, and a soldier of fortune who fought in five wars.

== Early years ==
He was born on April 18, 1897 in Manitowoc, Wisconsin, to Alma Mueller (1876–?) and Alman Ivory Lord (1859–?). Some sources list his birth as April 8, 1900. He had two siblings: Lucia Lord (1902–?); and Zayda Lord (1905–?). By 1910 he was living with his maternal grandparents: Lena (1856–?) and Fred Mueller (1847–?). By 1917 Fred and his mother and siblings were living in Houston, Texas, and by 1920 his mother was a widow.

== World War I ==
Lord circa 1914-1918

Lord with his Sopwith Dolphin in April 1918

According to one story, Lord enlisted in the U.S. Army in 1917, but was discharged from the 3rd Texas Infantry when it was learned that he was only 17 years old. However, in 1917, he would have been 20. Whatever his reason, he went to Toronto, Ontario, Canada where he joined the Royal Flying Corps. He had to renounce his American citizenship on May 25, 1917:

I was born in the town of Manitowoc in the state of Wisconsin, one of the United States of America ... I have come to the city of Toronto from Houston, Texas, for the express purpose of enlisting and entering the Royal Flying Corps of the Canadian Army for service overseas. And I do hereby solemnly declare my purpose and intention to become a British subject and I do hereby renounce my citizenship as a Citizen of the United States of America. ...

After completing his training in England, he joined 79 Squadron in France. Flying a Sopwith Dolphin, Lord became an ace along with four other pilots in the squadron: Francis W. Gillet, Ronald Bannerman, John McNeaney, and Edgar Taylor. On June 27, 1918, Lord shot down an Albatros D.V as his third kill. On his return to the airfield, he saw an allied formation engaged with several Pfalz scouts. He joined in and shot down a Fokker Dr.I, and was awarded the Distinguished Flying Cross. He rose to the position of flight commander before being wounded in October. His final score in World War I was an observation balloon and eight aircraft claimed destroyed, three 'out of control'.

== Russian Civil War ==
He served with RAF forces during the Allied Intervention in Russia in 1919, earning a bar to his Distinguished Flying Cross when on June 27, 1919, he was piloting an RE.8 and found the position of the enemy on the Pinega River, four versts from Pilegori, and "attacked the moving columns from a height of 200 feet with such effect that their transport was stampeded and their expected attack broke down, without any casualties being sustained by our forces."

== Mexican Revolution ==
Leaving the RAF in November 1919, between the wars, he was a barnstormer and an aide to the Mexican air force during the Mexican Revolution. By 1927, he was living in New York City and was using the Chrysler Building as his address. Traveling with him was Constance E. (1901–?) who was listed as his wife. By July 1937, he was married to a woman named Mildred.

== Spanish Civil War ==
He flew on the Republican side in the Spanish Civil War with Bert Acosta and Eddie August Schneider in the Yankee Squadron, flying Breguet two-seaters through 1936.

I've had a wing fold up at a thousand feet while sitting on a dud parachute. I've been backed up against a wall looking down the rifle barrels of a firing squad. I've felt the automatic of my own commanding officer poked in my ribs. While being smuggled from Spain into France to visit my wife, I've had a speed boat pilot killed by Fascist bullets in the Bay of Biscay. I've fought half a dozen German pursuit planes in the air with an orchestra leader as a gunner. And of all places to be during a bomb raid I was there - locked up in jail - and with my wife. And these events have not been an accumulation of my war service in France, or Russia, or Mexico, but happened during the past few months while serving as a pilot with the Government forces in Spain. ... A Spanish pilot, Jose Galarza, bailed out from a crippled ship, during a fight, and landed safely in Franco's line. But the next day a Junker bomber droned over our field and dropped a box. It contained the chopped up cadaver of Jose ... Lafayette! Pulaski! Rochambeau! Who were they? Glorious foreign volunteers who aided us in time of need. We name bridges, boats, and towns after them now. Our kids read about them in our histories. ... And over in Spain foreign volunteers are fighting that a friendly democratic nation may survive. In most instances those volunteers came from the army of unemployed in their countries where they were without hope. In all cases they are highly skilled technical men. Their hope is a new lease on life; but the usual reward has been a nameless grave. ...

== World War II ==
During World War II, he tried to join the RAF again; it is said he got so far as to be assigned to his old squadron before the authorities caught up with him. Instead, he joined the Air Transport Auxiliary (ATA) that transported aircraft around Britain. On January 3, 1941, he wrote his sister Lucia discussing his upcoming eye surgery:

... and in less than a week now, I get the eye sliced up. And I know it'll be a success. Pray for me at 4pm on the tenth, will you. So here's hoping that when they take the bandages off on about the 20th, my eye will function… Ah just ain't got the dough for the hospital on the tenth. If can't get it - well, then no operation as can't ask the doctor to actually fork out money for me in addition. So, sister, please see what you can do in addition to the usual ten-spot, will you please? And let me have it by Wednesday." [Lord goes on to explain that he will soon be able to pay her back and will no longer be a financial burden to her because] a group of Chinese saw me today and want to take lessons from me and will even pay for a ship as soon as the eye is okay. Private flying, govt. jobs, city and state jobs - all waiting.

He served as a Pilot First Officer in the ATA from 21 April 1941 until 20 April 1943.

== Death ==
In 1967, he was murdered by a vagrant in Apple Valley, California.

== Archive ==
- His archive was held by the Raab Collection. There are over a hundred photographs taken during the 1917-1919 period, some showing Lord with his plane; and a typescript entitled The Pilot and the Farmer's Daughter, which is an article about a love affair he had with a French woman while stationed in France during World War I. Lord was keen to write, and penned several articles on his experiences during the many wars in which he participated. There is no evidence any of these pieces were ever published. This manuscript, entitled So I'm a Military Prostitute, chronicles his experiences as a so-called soldier for hire (but actually a dedicated sympathizer) fighting alongside the Republican forces in the Spanish Civil War. Later in his life, he also approached movie production companies in the hopes that his story would be turned into a feature film.

== Publications ==
- More Close Calls in Russia, Flying Aces magazine, March 1937. Describes his exploits in Russia before the Armistice.
- I Dabbled With Death in Russia, Flying Aces magazine, December 1936.
- I Faced Death in Spanish Skies, Flying Aces magazine, July 1937
- Spain HAS Witnessed a Modern Air War! Flying Aces magazine, August 1938

== See also ==
- List of World War I flying aces from the United States

== Bibliography ==
American Aces of World War 1 Harry Dempsey. Osprey Publishing, 2001. ISBN 1-84176-375-6, ISBN 978-1-84176-375-0.
