= Richard James (aviator) =

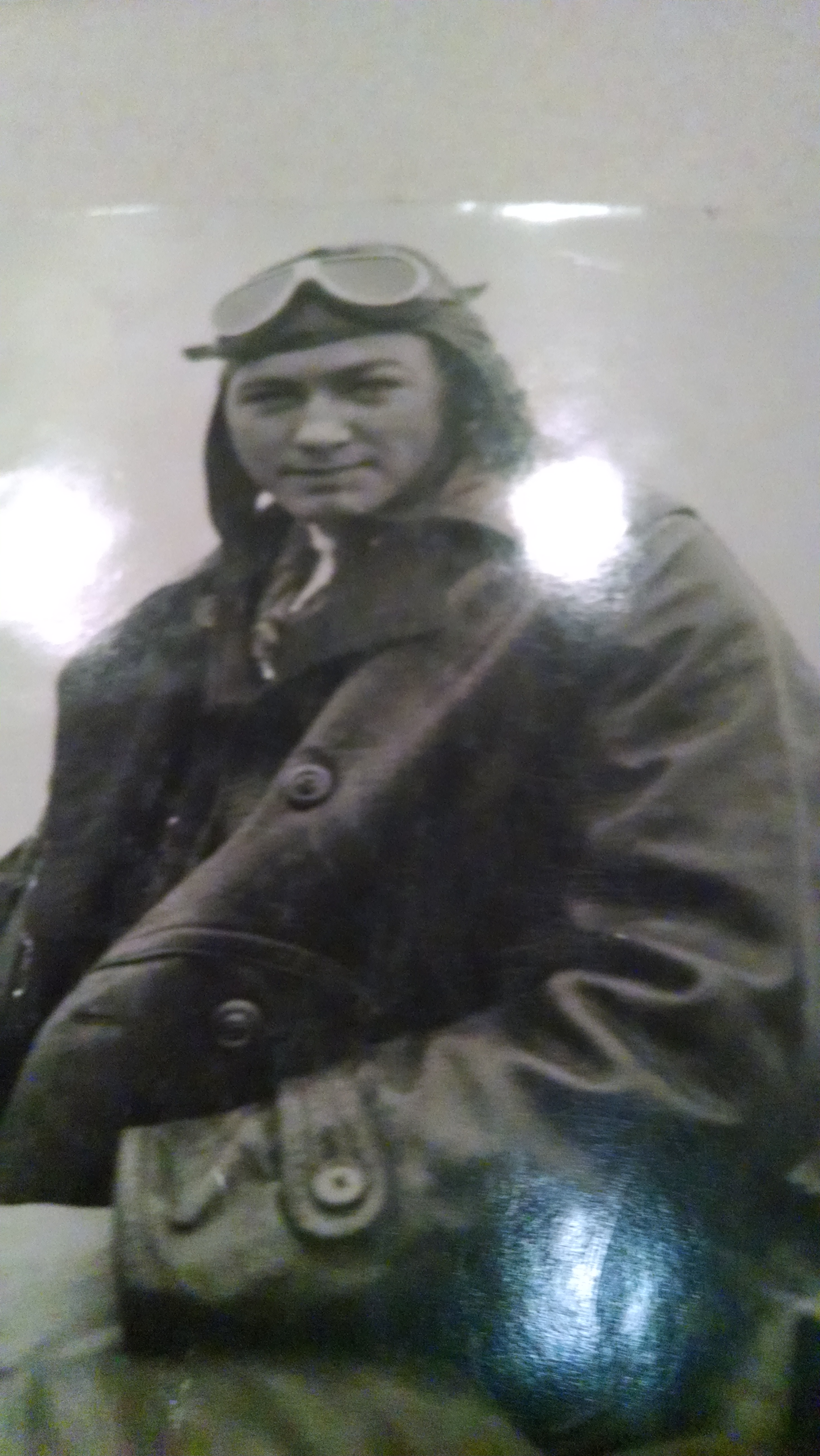
Dick James

Richard James (1911–1989) set the junior transcontinental air speed record in 1928. He completed the flight on December 15, 1928, arriving in New York. He had left from San Francisco. The elapsed flying time was 48 hours, spread over one month. The contest was sponsored by the Society for the Promotion of Aviation. Dick James, as he was known to friends and family, was also awarded the National Clifford B. Harmon Award for 1928, and received a silver loving cup made by Tiffany & Company as well as having a ticker-tape parade in New York City.

His record stood till 1930, when it was broken by Frank Goldsborough. He was born in Terre Haute, Indiana and flew a Travel Air 9000.
