= David Vincent Stratton =

American Engineer

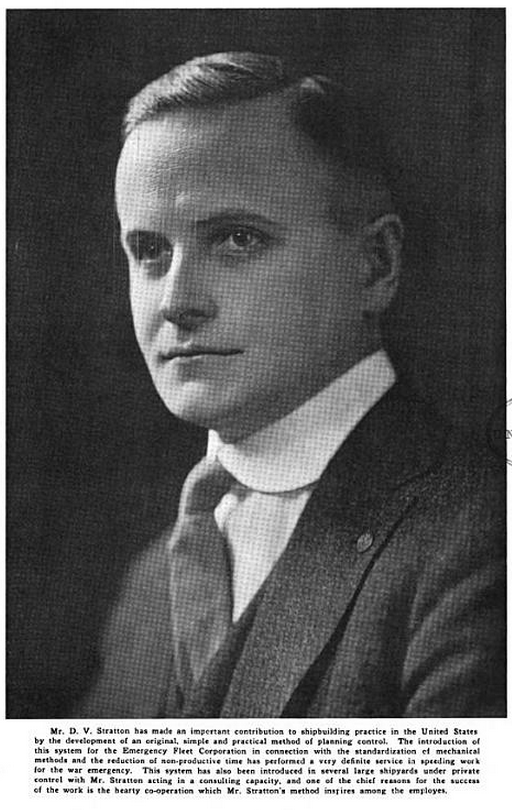
- Stratton in 1919
- Born: October 14, 1884; Altoona, South Dakota, United States
- Died: February 25, 1968 (aged 83); Sacramento, California
- Occupations: Industrial engineer and business executive
- Known for: His contributions to shipbuilding in the United States through the development of time and motion study

David Vincent Stratton (October 14, 1884 – February 25, 1968) was an American industrial engineer and business executive. He was vice president of the Great Lakes Aircraft Company in 1930 and in 1931 was president of the Johnson Motor Company. He made important contributions to shipbuilding in the United States by the development of time and motion study.

== Early life ==
He was born on October 14, 1884, in Altoona, South Dakota, now part of Hitchcock, South Dakota.

== Career ==
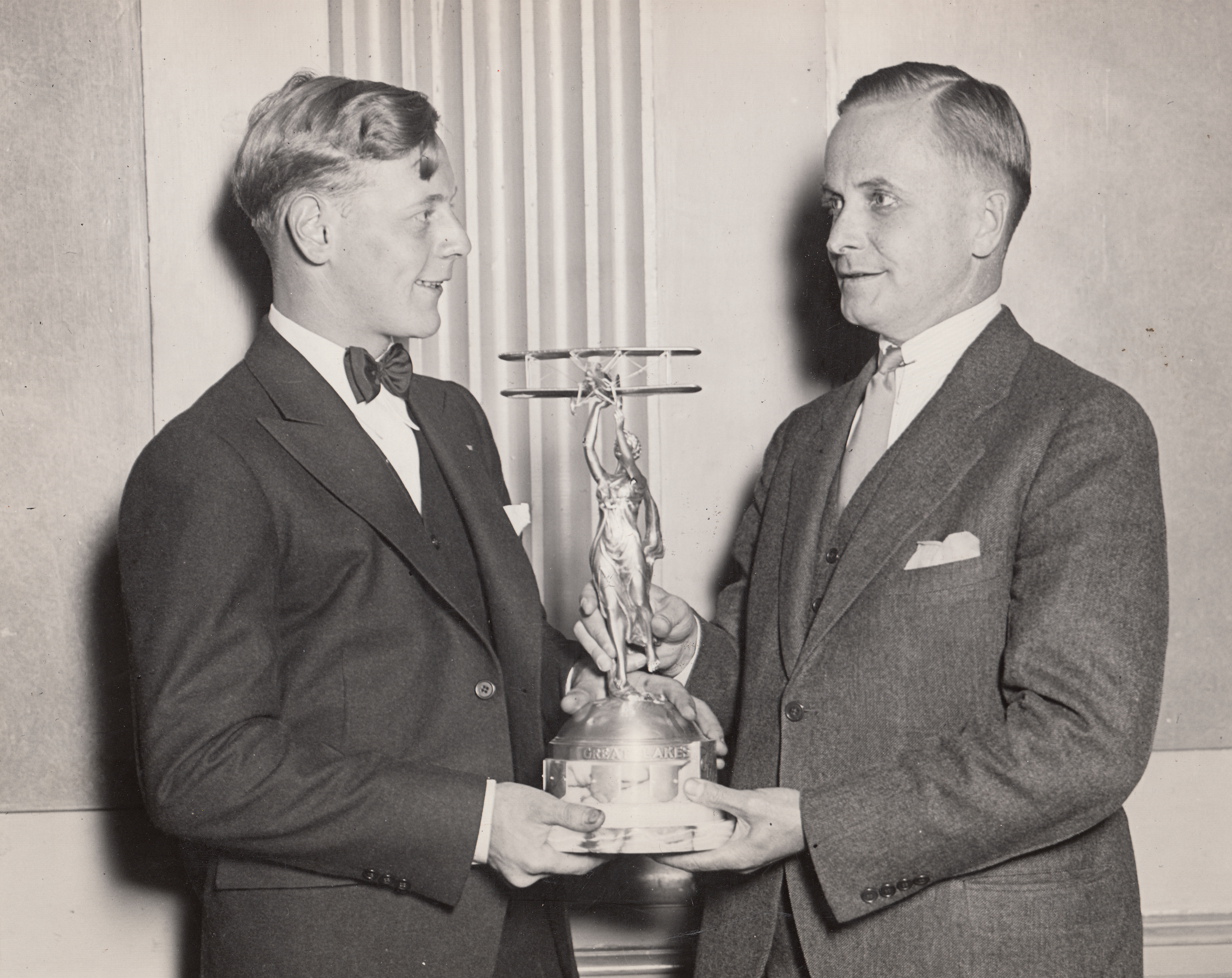
Eddie August Schneider on September 27, 1930, accepting the Great Lakes Trophy in Detroit, Michigan, from David Vincent Stratton of the Great Lakes Aircraft Corporation

In 1908 he became the chief clerk to the division engineer in charge of La Boca Dredging Division of the Panama Canal.

By 1924 he was president of New York Harbor Dry Dock, replacing George C. Clark. In 1930 he became vice president of the Great Lakes Aircraft Corporation.

In 1931 he was appointed as president of the Johnson Motor Company in Waukegan, Illinois.

By 1942 he was working as an independent consultant. In 1944 he was working for the Merco - Nordstrom Valve Company in Oakland, California.

== Personal life and death ==
He died on February 25, 1968, in Sacramento, California.
