= Richard Bronaugh Barnitz =

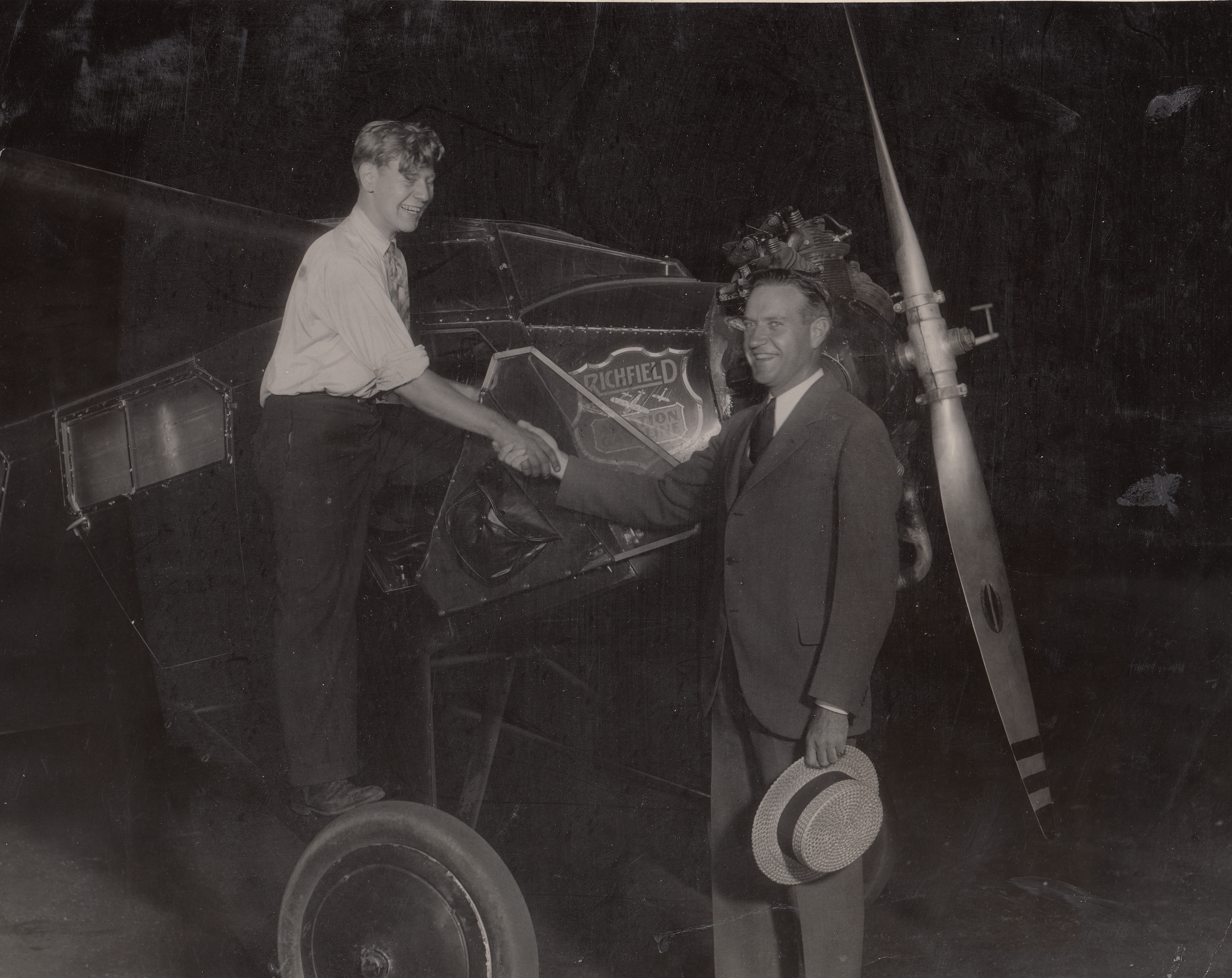
Eddie August Schneider (1911–1940) shaking the hand of Barnitz in Los Angeles on August 21, 1930

Richard Bronaugh Barnitz (November 25, 1891 – December 22, 1960) was a lieutenant colonel in the US Army and the manager of the Los Angeles Airport from about 1930 until 1940.

== Biography ==
He was born on November 25, 1891, in San Antonio, Texas to Wilhelmina Magill (1853-c.1919) and Harry Dagerfield Barnitz (1855–1916). He was an early proponent of having a nationwide system of municipally owned airports, and he managed the Los Angeles Airport from at least 1930 until he retired in 1940. He died on December 22, 1960, and was buried in Fort Sam Houston National Cemetery under the name "Richard Bronaugh Barnitz".
