= Great Lakes Aircraft Company =

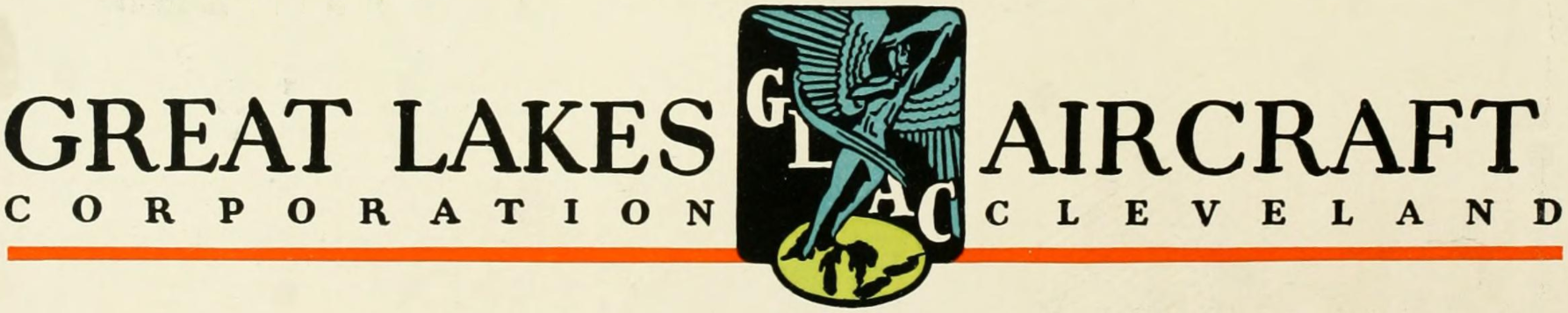

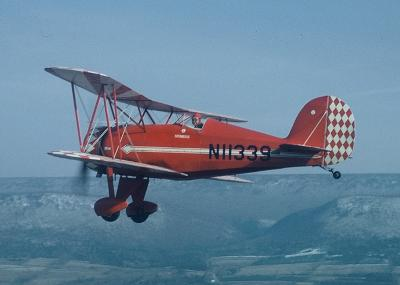
- 1932 Great Lakes 2T-1A
- Industry: Aerospace
- Founded: 1929 in Cleveland, Ohio
- Founder: John Duncan
- Headquarters: Palmer Lake, Colorado, United States
- Website: greatlakesaircraftcompany.com

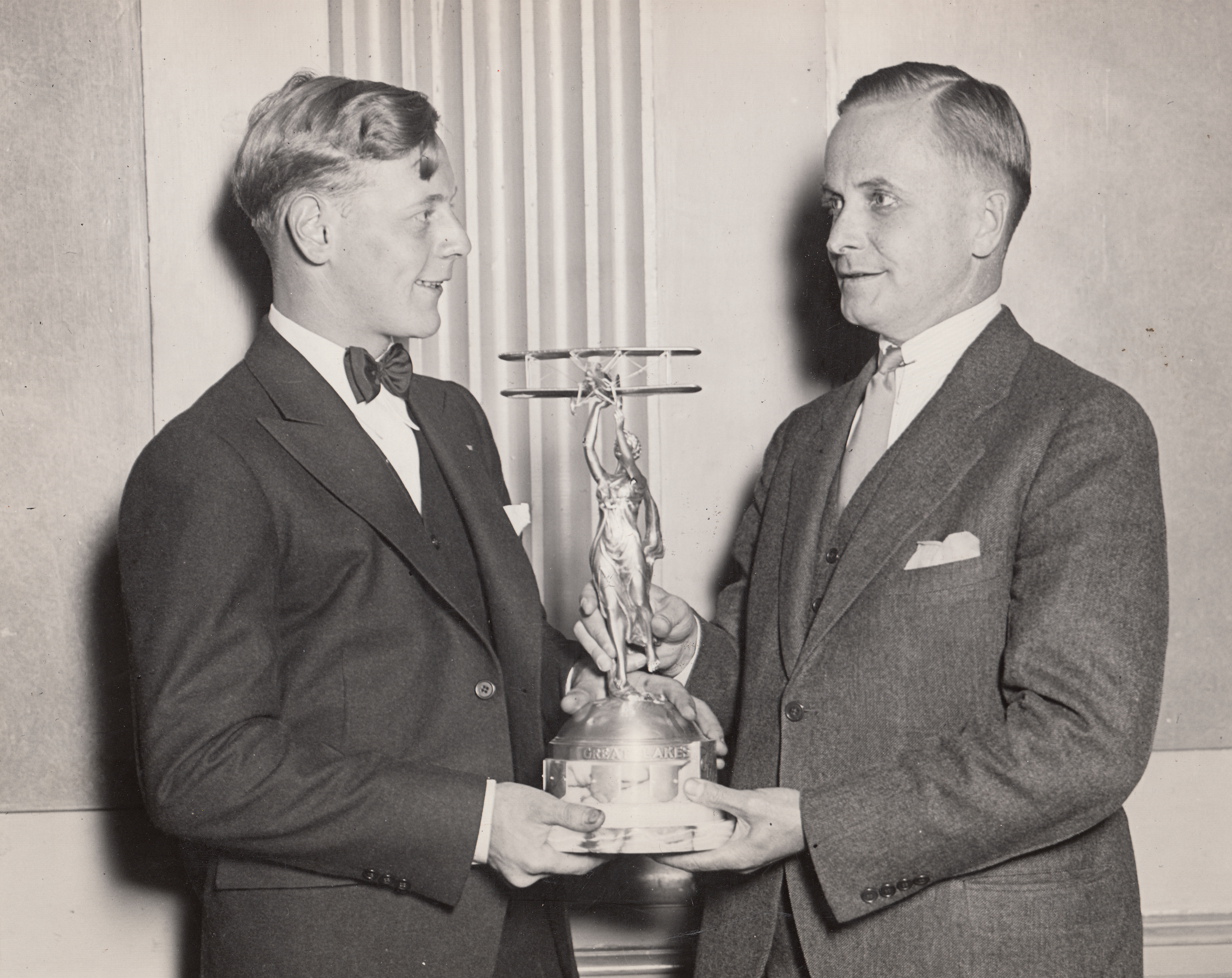
Eddie August Schneider on September 27, 1930 accepting the Great Lakes Trophy in Detroit, Michigan from David Vincent Stratton of the Great Lakes Aircraft Corporation

The Great Lakes Aircraft Company was an aircraft manufacturer which came into being in October 1928, after the Glenn L. Martin Company relocated from Cleveland, Ohio to Baltimore, Maryland. The new company purchased Martin's former Cleveland factory, inheriting with it production jigs for Martin's T4M torpedo bomber; because of this, when the Navy decided that it needed additional examples of this type, it ordered them from Great Lakes, as the Great Lakes TG. The company went on to develop a biplane dive bomber (the BG) for the Navy, but is best remembered for a series of sport and aerobatic planes developed for the civilian market, most notably the 2T-1A Sport Trainer.

The original company did not last long, folding in 1935 after failing to gain further military contracts, and after seeing the private plane market collapse because of the Great Depression. However, interest in its sport and aerobatic planes has continued through the years, and since the 1960s several companies have placed variants of these Great Lakes types back in production for fairly brief periods.

== History ==
The Great Lakes Aircraft Company was founded in October 1928 as a subsidiary of an aviation industry holding company, Allied Motor Industries; William Roberts Wilson served as Chairman of the Board of both Allied and Great Lakes, with P.B. "Zeke" Rogers as Chief Engineer for Great Lakes. By 2 January 1929 the old Martin assembly line was back in operation, churning out a minimally modified version of Martin's T4M torpedo bomber as the Great Lakes TG-1.

== Aircraft ==
Between 1929 and 1935 the company (sometimes abbreviated as GLAC) built biplane aircraft for both the civilian and military markets. In 1933, the company was reportedly working on a steam power plant for driving aircraft turbines.

Model name	First flight	Number built	Type
Great Lakes BG	1933	61	Dive bomber
Great Lakes B2G		1	BG with retractable landing gear and enclosed bomb bay
Great Lakes TG-1		18	License built T4M
Great Lakes TG-1 Commercial		2	Civilian version of TG
Great Lakes TG-2		32	Reengined version of TG-1
Great Lakes XSG	1931	1	Prototype biplane observation flying boat
Great Lakes TBG		1	Prototype torpedo bomber
Great Lakes 2-S-W			
Great Lakes 2-T-1		~240	Training biplane
Great Lakes 2-T-2 Speedster		1	Racing version of 2-T-1-A
Great Lakes 4-A-1		3	Twin engine flying boat
Great Lakes 41		1	Development of Inland Model T
Great Lakes X		1	Reengined version of 2-T-1E

=== Military Aircraft ===
After the completion of 18 TG-1s, an improved TG-2 model was produced, as were 61 examples of an original Great Lakes design, the BG heavy dive bomber, from 1933 onward. However, several later prototypes for the U.S. Navy attracted no production orders.

=== Sport Trainer (2T Series) ===
From its earliest days the company focused on the development of aircraft for private owners. The model that most people think of today when someone says, "Great Lakes Aircraft," is the enduring 2T biplane, also known as the Great Lakes Sport Trainer. It was designed and sold as a two-place, open cockpit biplane. The 2T biplane was notably smaller than some competing models manufactured by Stearman, WACO and Travel Air.

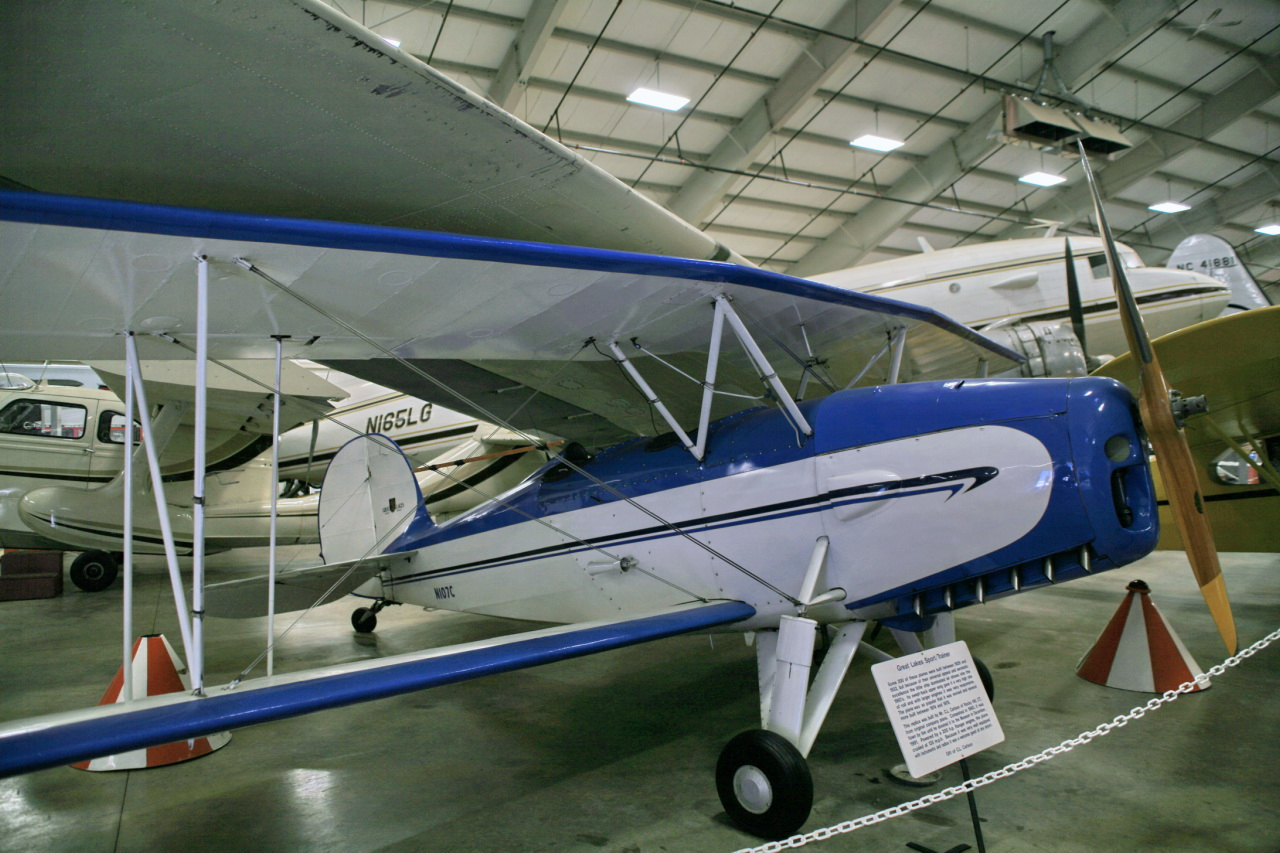
Great Lakes 2T-1A Sportster

At its peak, Great Lakes had received as many as 650 deposits toward tentative orders for new aircraft. With the onset of the Great Depression, however, more than half these orders disappeared, and in the final tally he company ended up building just 264 Sport Trainers. The company ceased operations in 1935, with the remaining stock of aircraft parts, as well as a complete set of drawings, being sold at a bankruptcy sale to Charles E. Smith of Willoughby, Ohio.

=== Aerobatic Use ===
As the years went by, many of the originally installed American Cirrus III engines were replaced by Warner radials, inline Menascos or Fairchild-Rangers, and horizontally opposed Lycomings, Franklins, or Continentals. Tex Rankin, a stunt pilot of the 1930s and 1940s, made the Great Lakes Sport Trainer famous. He had one specially modified and installed a 150 hp supercharged Menasco engine. It was painted red, white and blue with his name upright on one side, and upside down in the other, so folks would know who he was when he flew by upside down. Tex's airplane is being restored by the Oregon Aviation Museum.

For about 30 years, until the late 1960s, the Great Lakes Sport Trainer was the top American-made acro plane. Other pilots who made the Great Lakes reputation famous were: Hal Krier, Hank Kennedy, Bob "Tiger" Nance, Lindsay Parsons, Dorothy Hester, Betty Skelton, Charley Hillard, and Frank Price. The first United States entry in a world aerobatics contest was a Great Lakes biplane that Frank Price of Texas took to Eastern Europe in 1960.

== Great Lakes Trophy ==
From 1925 through 1931 the Ford Motor Company, having become involved in aviation through its Stout Metal Aircraft Division, sponsored a series of annual air races, the Ford National Reliability Air Tour, in which emphasis was placed on travelling long distances (eventually thousands of miles) without breaking down. Ford issued a trophy, the Edsel B. Ford Reliability Trophy, to each year's winner; however, over the last two years of the event the Great Lakes Company issued a second award, the Great Lakes Trophy, to the fastest plane with an engine of 510 cubic inches or less that participated in the race.

== Successors to the Company ==
During the 1960s, Harvey Swack of Cleveland obtained the rights to the Sport Trainer design and all the factory drawings for it. Based on these he designed a downsized, single-seat derivative called the "Baby Great Lakes," and then sold plans for both this and the full-sized 2T-1 to homebuilders until 1990, when he sold off the plans business to Steen Aero Lab of Palm Bay, Florida. A great number of homebuilt Great Lakes Sport Trainers has been built over the years, which kept interest in this old biplane alive.

In 1972 a man named Doug Champlin acquired rights to the original Sport Trainer design, set up operations as a new Great Lakes Aircraft Company, and produced a total of 137 examples of slightly modified versions (the 2T-1A-1 and, from 1974, the 2T-1A-2) at factories in Wichita, Kansas and Enid, Oklahoma. Champlin also built one Turbine powered Great Lakes 2T. With 420 hp (310 kW), it was quite a show stopper.

In 1979, Dean Franklin bought Champlin out, keeping the company name and setting up a new factoty in Eastman, Georgia. He took several partially built airframes there for completion. These, and ten new-build aircraft (Serial Numbers 1001 through 1010), were completed between 1980 and 1982. Then, in 1983, Franklin sold his interests to a group headed by John LaBelle, who constructed a small number of aircraft at Claremont, New Hampshire before closing in 1985.

In 2000, John Duncan of Palmer Lake, Colorado, bought the Great Lakes Sport Trainer type certificate and tooling, and set up yet another Great Lakes Aircraft Company. In 2006 he expressed an intention to bring the Sport Trainer back into production, but it is not clear that he ever did so. What is known is that, in 2011, the WACO Classic Aircraft Company acquired the right to build the 2T-1A-1 and -2 variants, and that, by 2022, they had produced 20 examples.
