= Robert N. Buck =

American aviator (1914–2007)

Robert Nietzel Buck
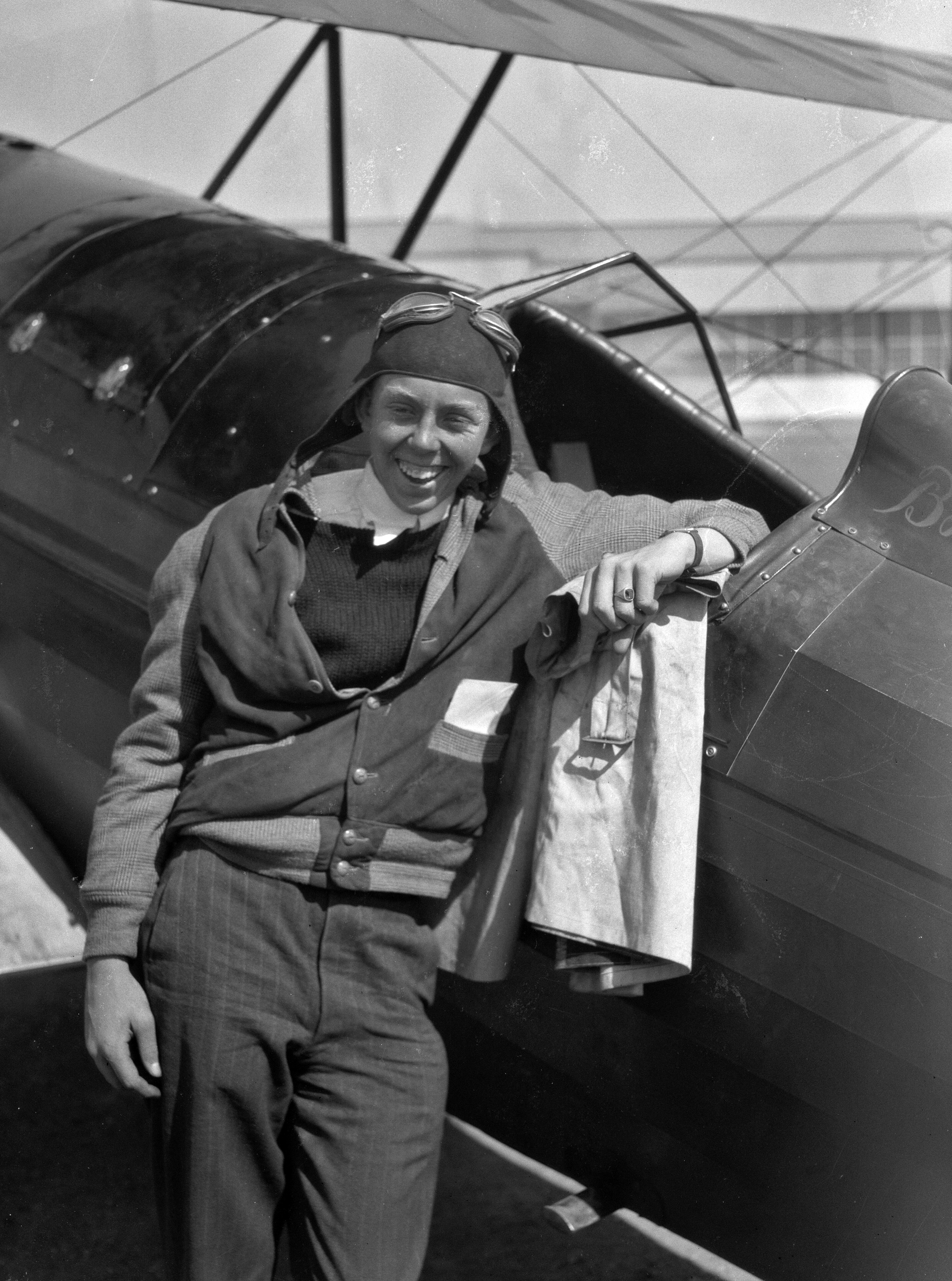
- Buck after his record-breaking flight
- Born: January 29, 1914; Elizabeth, New Jersey, US
- Died: April 14, 2007 (aged 93); Berlin, Vermont, US
- Occupation: Aviator

Robert Nietzel Buck (January 29, 1914 – April 14, 2007) broke the junior transcontinental air speed record in 1930 and for a time was the youngest licensed pilot in the United States.

== Early life ==
He was born in Elizabeth, New Jersey, on January 29, 1914, to Abijah Orange Buck (1869–1932) and Emily Nietzel. Emily was Abija's second wife, and she was the daughter of Elizabeth Bellingrath.

In 1930 at age 16 he took lessons in a Fleet Aircraft using a Kinner engine. He received the United States Department of Commerce license #13478.

On October 4, 1930, he beat the junior transcontinental airspeed record of Eddie August Schneider in his PA-6 Pitcairn Mailwing he named "Yankee Clipper". His time was 23 hours and 47 minutes of elapsed flying time. The junior record only counts time in the air and excludes time spent on the ground.

In December 1933, he flew to the Yucatan with Bob Nixon. As part of that trip, they stopped in Los Angeles and spoke at a meeting of Alpha Eta Rho, an aviation fraternity. They also participated in a cattle round up in Santa Rose, New Mexico.

== Career ==
In 1937 he began flying for TWA. Buck became a Captain in 1940, then was promoted to TWA's chief pilot in 1945. In September 1957, Buck piloted the first nonstop flight from Los Angeles to London, flying the long-range Lockheed L-1649 Starliner. The following year, he wrote an extensive description of the flight published by Air Facts magazine.

In 1965, he flew around the world from pole to pole in a Boeing 707. This was done with several other pilots in shifts. In 1970, he flew TWA's first Boeing 747 on Flight 800 from New York City to Paris, and in the same year wrote Weather Flying.

== Personal life ==
Buck married Jean Pearsall in 1938. He retired from TWA at age 60 on January 28, 1974 and moved to Vermont, where he wrote Flying Know-How, Art of Flying, and Pilot's Burden.

He died on April 14, 2007, in Berlin, Vermont, after complications from an accidental fall.

== Legacy ==
He was inducted into the Aviation Hall of Fame of New Jersey in 1981.

== Publications ==
- Flying Know-How. New York, N.Y.: Delacorte Press/E. Friede. 1975. ISBN 0-440-04934-2.
- The Art of Flying. New York: Macmillan. 1984. ISBN 0-02-518220-X.
- The Pilot's Burden: Flight Safety and the Roots of Pilot Error. Ames: Iowa State University. 1994. ISBN 0-8138-2357-9.
- Weather Flying. New York: McGraw-Hill. 1998. ISBN 0-07-008761-X.
- North Star Over my Shoulder: A Flying Life. New York: Simon & Schuster. 2002. ISBN 0-7432-1964-3.
