= Tribby Peak =

Mountain in Antarctica

Map of Thurston Island

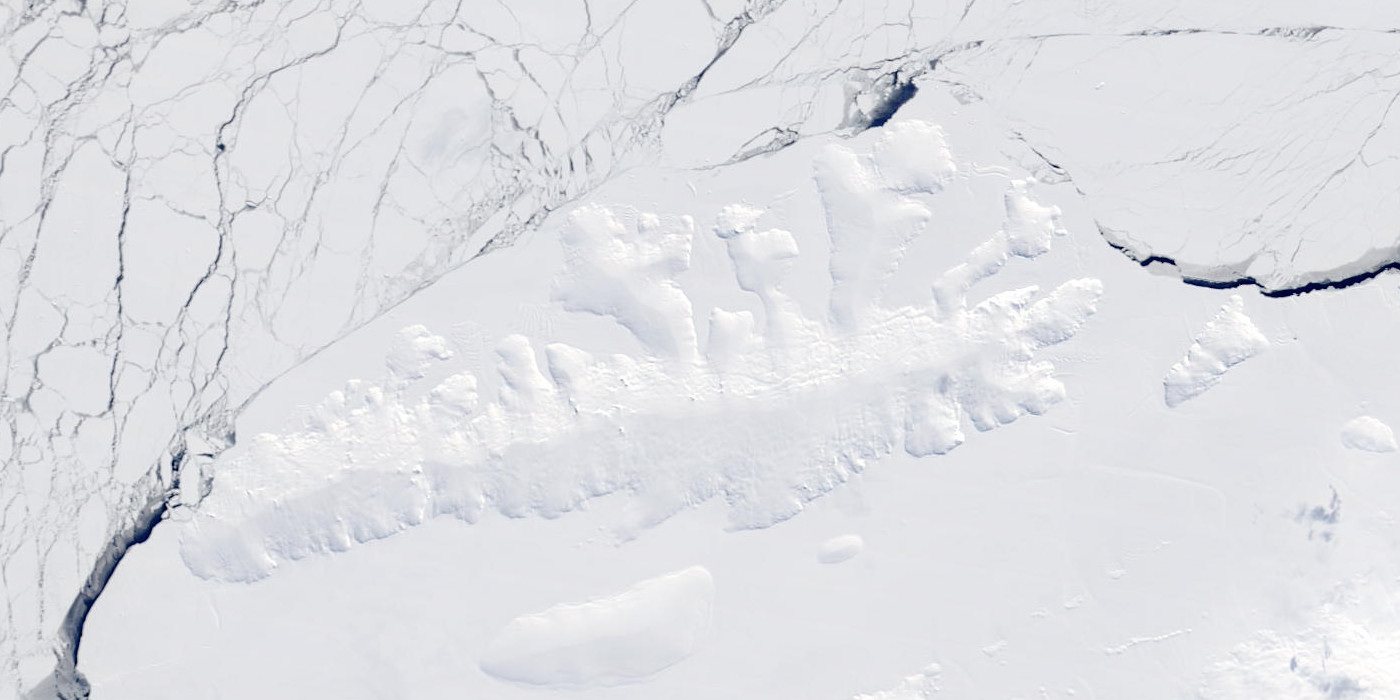
Satellite image of Thurston Island

Tribby Peak (71°56′S 97°48′W) is a peak 1.5 nautical miles (2.8 km; 1.7 mi) west of Mount Bubier on Edwards Peninsula, Thurston Island. It was named by the Advisory Committee on Antarctic Names (US-ACAN) after Osborne M. Tribby, the Pharmacist's Mate in the Eastern Group of U.S. Navy Operation Highjump and an aircrewman on the PBM Mariner flight to Noville Peninsula on January 11–12, 1947, in which survivors of the December 30 PBM crash were rescued and returned to the seaplane tender Pine Island.

== Maps ==
- Thurston Island – Jones Mountains. 1:500000 Antarctica Sketch Map. US Geological Survey, 1967.
- Antarctic Digital Database (ADD). Scale 1:250000 topographic map of Antarctica. Scientific Committee on Antarctic Research (SCAR). Since 1993, regularly upgraded and updated.
