= Mount Gimber =

Mountain in Ellsworth Land, Antarctica

Highest point
- Coordinates: 72°1′S 102°0′W

Geography
- Location: Thurston Island, Ellsworth Land, Antarctica
- Parent range: Walker Mountains

Map of Thurston Island.

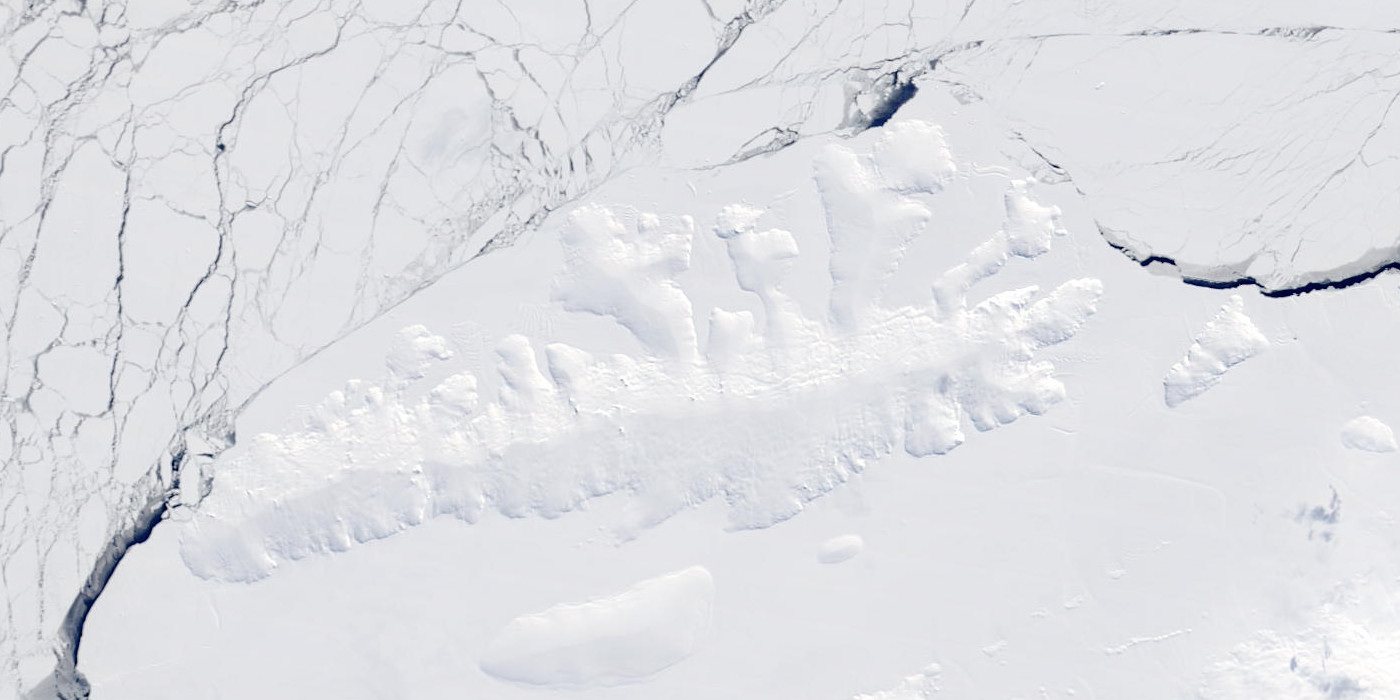
Satellite image of Thurston Island.

Mount Gimber (72°1′S 102°0′W) is an ice-covered mountain 0.5 nautical miles (0.93 km) southeast of Landfall Peak in the extreme west part of Thurston Island, Ellsworth Land, Antarctica. It was named by the Advisory Committee on Antarctic Names (US-ACAN) after Commander H.M.S. Gimber, the captain of the destroyer Brownson in the Eastern Group of U.S. Navy Operation Highjump, 1946–47.

== See also ==
- Mountains in Antarctica

== Maps ==
- Thurston Island – Jones Mountains. 1:500000 Antarctica Sketch Map. US Geological Survey, 1967.
- Antarctic Digital Database (ADD). Scale 1:250000 topographic map of Antarctica. Scientific Committee on Antarctic Research (SCAR), 1993–2016.
