= Floyd Bennett =

United States Navy Medal of Honor recipient (1890–1928)

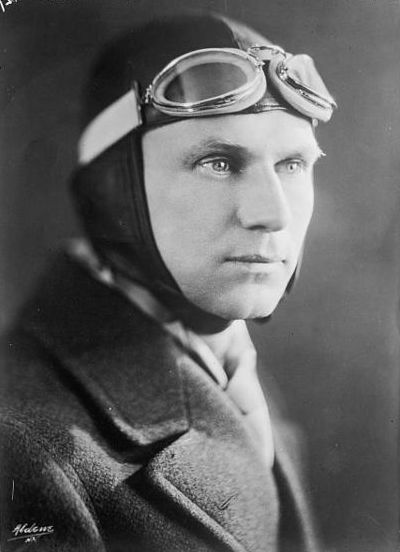
- Born: October 25, 1890; Warrensburg, New York, US
- Died: April 25, 1928 (aged 37); Quebec City, Quebec, Canada
- Burial place: Arlington National Cemetery
- Military career
- Allegiance: United States of America
- Branch: United States Navy
- Service years: 1917–1928
- Rank: Warrant Officer
- Awards: Medal of Honor

Floyd Bennett (October 25, 1890 – April 25, 1928) was a United States Naval Aviator who, along with then USN Commander Richard E. Byrd, made the first flight to the North Pole in May 1926. However, their claim to have reached the pole is disputed.

== Biography ==
Bennett was born in Warrensburg, New York, in 1890. He was an automobile mechanic before he enlisted in the Navy in 1917, during World War I. Bennett attended flight school, learned to fly and was rated as an Aviation Pilot. Bennett served with Richard E. Byrd on an aviation survey of Greenland in 1925, on which Byrd came to respect his ability as a pilot.

=== North Pole flight ===
Byrd named Bennett as his pilot for an attempt to reach the North Pole by air in 1926. The expedition was financed by John D. Rockefeller Jr., Edsel Ford, Vincent Astor, Rodman Wanamaker and T.F. Ryan.

Bennett was at the controls on May 9 as the two men made their attempt, in a Fokker tri-motor called the Josephine Ford. They returned to their airfield in Spitzbergen on that day. During the flight, one of the aircraft's engines developed an oil leak. Bennett advised turning back but Byrd decided to continue the flight. Although members of the European press were skeptical of their claim (because it seemed that the plane had been away from Spitzbergen too briefly to have reached the North Pole), Byrd and Bennett were lionized as heroes in America.

Both Bennett and Byrd received the Medal of Honor, as well as the Navy Distinguished Service Medal for this feat. Upon their arrival in the United States, Byrd was awarded the Hubbard Medal of the National Geographic Society and Bennett was awarded a gold medal from the society in recognition of their achievement. The subsequent discovery of Byrd's diary of the flight, with erased (but still legible) sextant readings, has been considered as evidence they might not have reached the North Pole.

=== Post North Pole flight ===
After returning to the United States, Bennett flew the Josephine Ford on a goodwill tour of America, with Bernt Balchen as his co-pilot. Later in his life Balchen claimed that Bennett confessed to him that he and Byrd did not reach the North Pole but, instead, flew around in circles. Balchen would go on to pilot Byrd to the South Pole in 1929, became a highly decorated Army Air Forces officer during the Second World War and retired from the United States Air Force as a colonel.

Byrd and his team had been leading candidates to win the large Orteig Prize in 1927, to be awarded for the first nonstop flight between France and the United States. Once again, Byrd named Bennett as his pilot for the attempt. However, Bennett was seriously injured during a practice flight and the airplane, a Fokker F-VIIb-3m named America, was badly damaged when it crashed on take-off. Byrd and his fellow pilot George O. Noville were also slightly injured in the crash. Following this failure by Bennett and Byrd, Charles Lindbergh won the Orteig Prize, flying from Long Island, New York, nonstop to Paris, France.

=== Bremen Flyers and Death ===
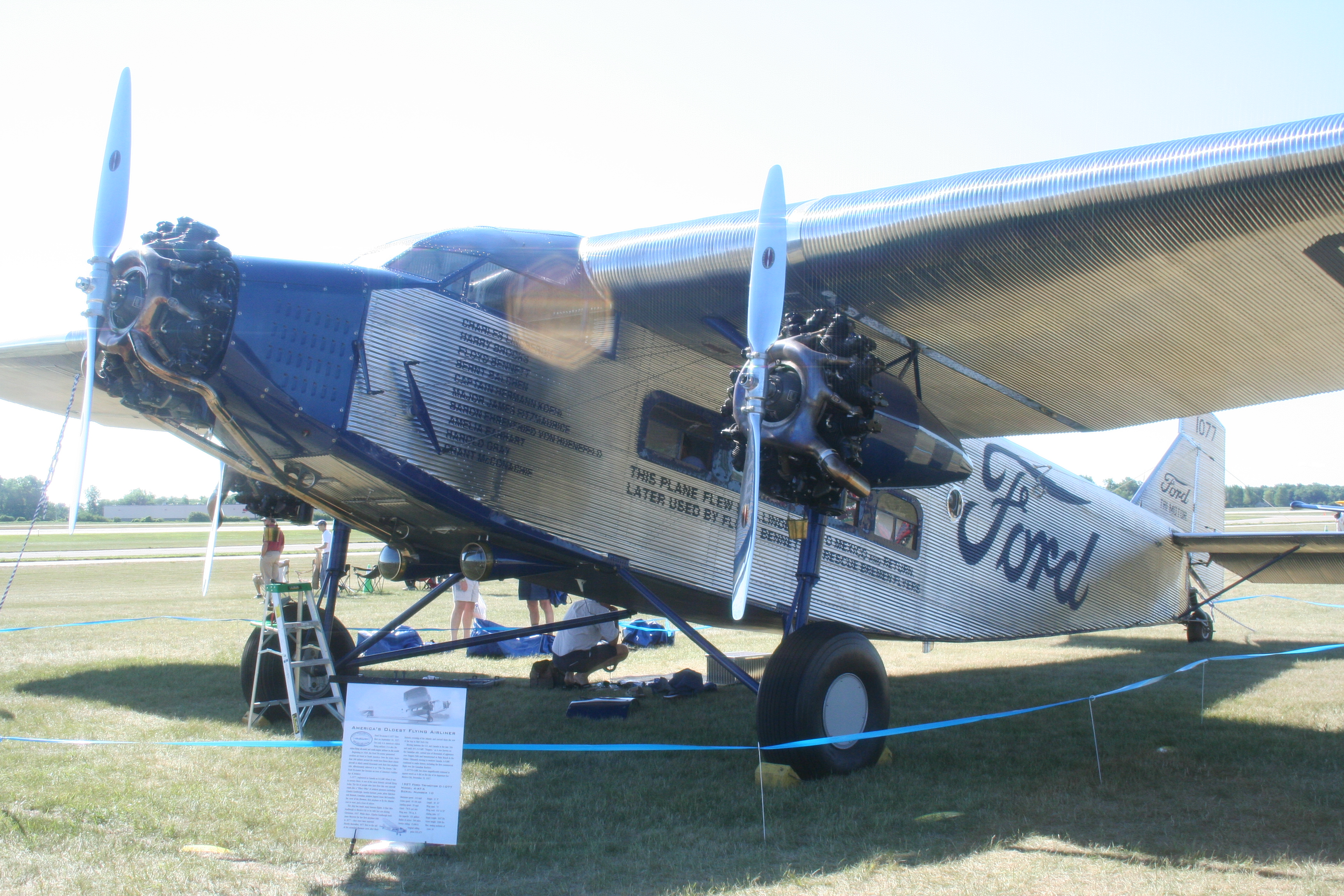
The Ford Trimotor used in the Bremen Rescue

The Bremen was a German aircraft which had just completed the first successful transatlantic aeroplane flight from east to west, but was damaged and unflyable after a landing on a peat bog on Greenly Island, Canada at the end of that non-stop flight from Europe, on April 13, 1928. Floyd Bennett and Bernt Balchen flew a Ford Trimotor to pick up the three stranded Bremen Flyers.

Bennett had developed pneumonia following a previous crash. His condition worsened during the rescue, and he died shortly afterward, while in hospital in Quebec City, on April 25, 1928. Balchen was paid $10,000 ($188,000 today) for the effort, an amount that was passed to Bennett's widow. He was buried at Arlington National Cemetery, in Arlington County, Virginia.

== Honors ==
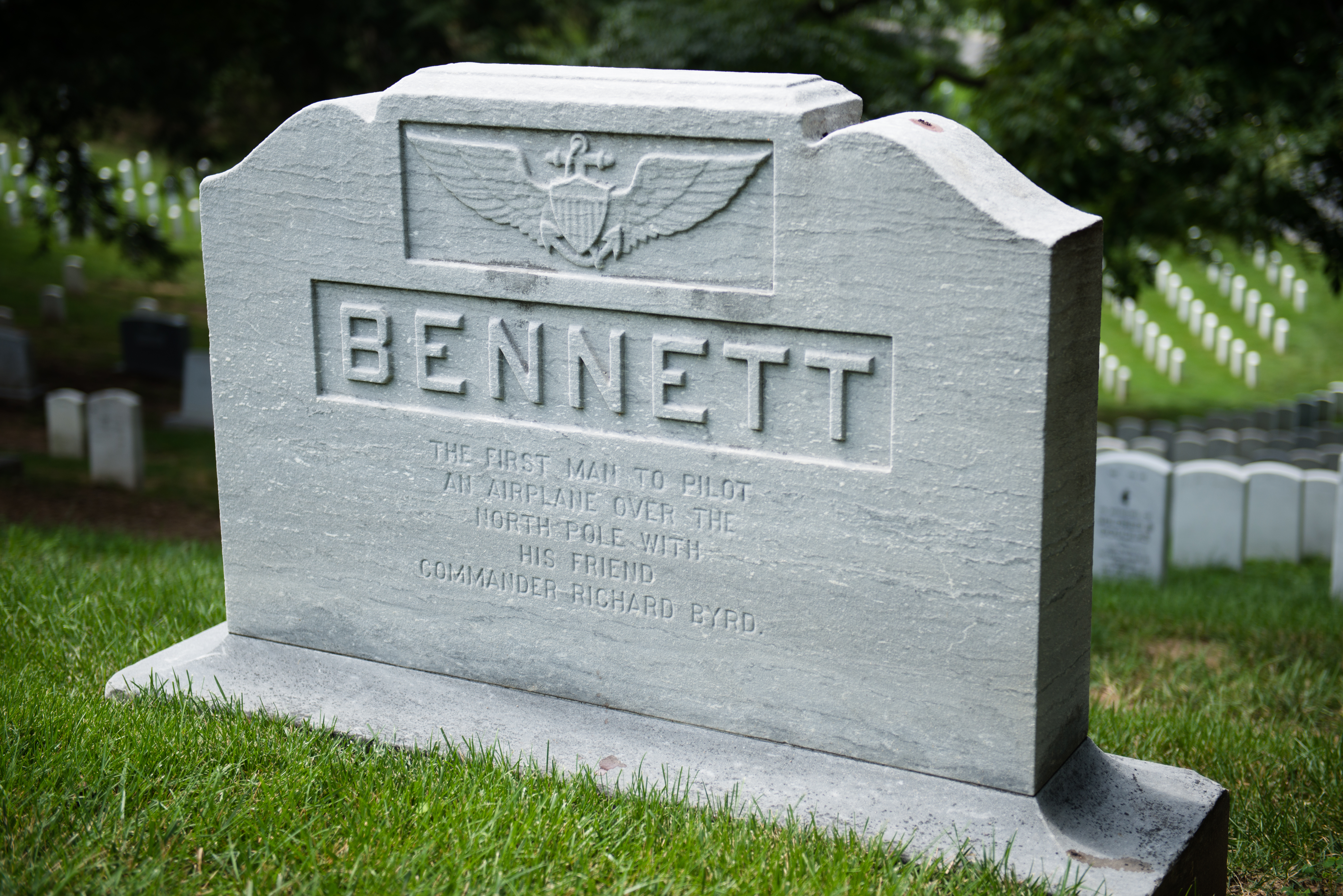
Grave at Arlington National Cemetery

Bennett and Byrd became national heroes upon their return from the Arctic when they arrived in New York on June 22, 1926. They received numerous honors from both governments and private organizations. Congress voted to award both men the Medal of Honor by a special act passed on December 21, 1926. The medals were presented to Byrd and Bennett at the White House by President Coolidge on February 25, 1927. Shortly after his return to the United States, Bennett was promoted from Chief Aviation Pilot to the warrant officer rank of Machinist. Bennett's date of rank as a warrant officer was May 9, 1926 – the date of his historic flight.

Bennett received the following awards during his career in the Navy:

- Medal of Honor
- Distinguished Service Medal
- Good Conduct Medal
- World War I Victory Medal

=== Medal of Honor citation ===
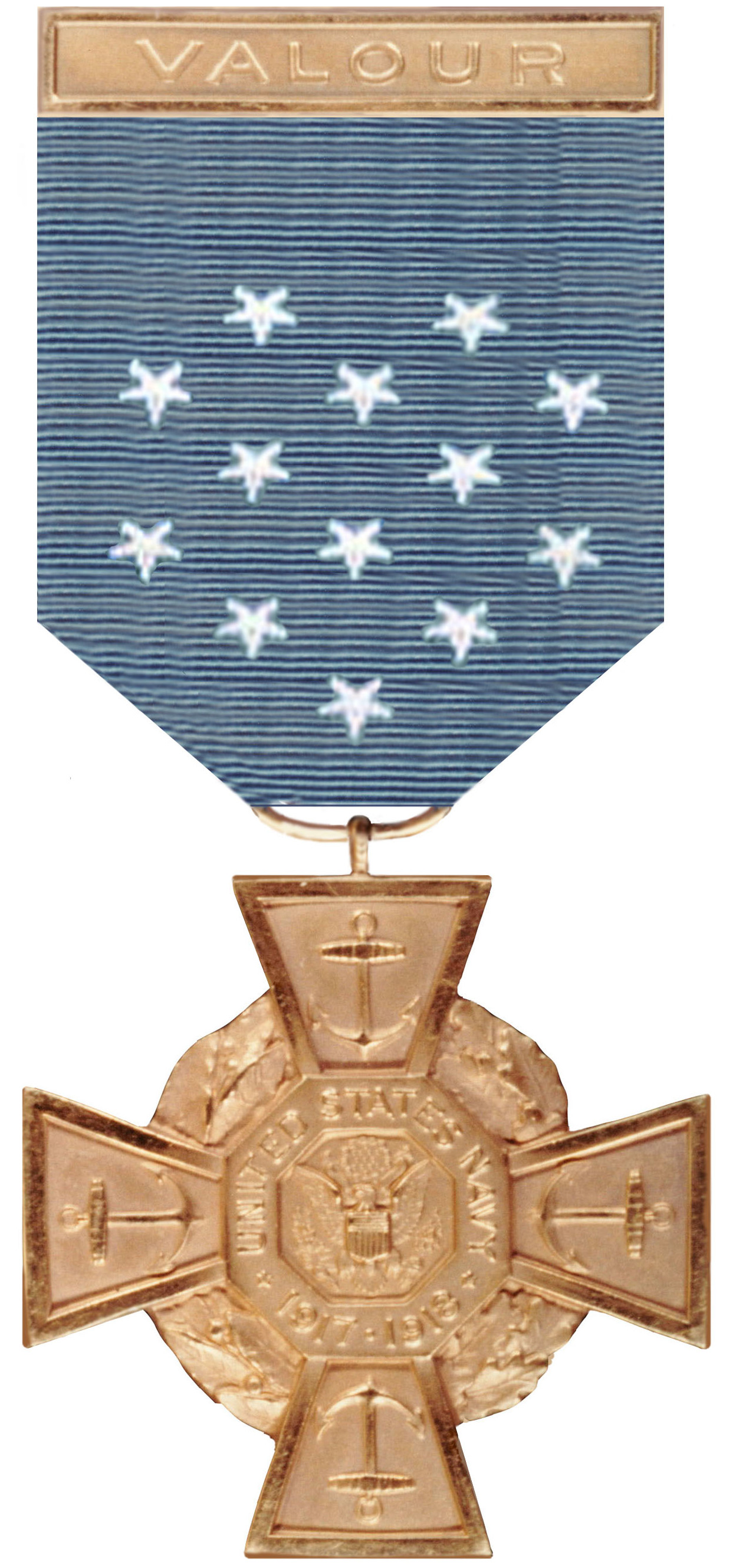
Medal of Honor

Rank and organization: Machinist, U.S. Navy. Born: October 25, 1890, Warrensburg, N.Y. Accredited to: New York. Other Navy award: Distinguished Service Medal.

Citation:

For distinguishing himself conspicuously by courage and intrepidity at the risk of his life as a member of the Byrd Arctic Expedition and thus contributing largely to the success of the first heavier-than-air flight to the North Pole and return.

=== Distinguished Service Medal citation ===
The President of the United States of America takes pleasure in presenting the Navy Distinguished Service Medal to Aviation Pilot Floyd Bennett, United States Navy, for exceptionally meritorious and distinguished service in a position of great responsibility to the Government of the United States. His courage and ability contributed largely to the success of the first heavier-than-air craft flight to the North Pole and return.

== Legacy ==
- Two airports in New York state are named in honor of Floyd Bennett: Floyd Bennett Field, New York City's first municipal airport, and Floyd Bennett Memorial Airport in Queensbury, New York, near his birthplace. Floyd Bennett Field is now part of the Gateway National Recreation Area.
- The destroyer USS Bennett (DD-473) was also named in his honor.
- On his flight to the South Pole in 1929, Commander Byrd named his Ford Tri-motor airplane the Floyd Bennett in his honor. The Floyd Bennett is on display at the Henry Ford Museum in Dearborn, Michigan.
- In his hometown of Warrensburg is the Floyd Bennett Park and Bandstand.
- PS 203 in New York City is named Floyd Bennett School.
- The Bennett Platform, an Antarctic mesa, was named in Bennett's honor.

== See also ==
- List of Medal of Honor recipients in non-combat incidents
