= Glaciers on Thurston Island =

Map of Thurston Island.

This is a list of glaciers on Thurston Island, an ice-covered, glacially dissected island, 215 km (134 mi) long, 90 km (56 mi) wide and 15,700 km^{2} (6,062 sq mi) in area, lying a short way off the northwest end of Ellsworth Land, Antarctica. It is the third-largest island of Antarctica, after Alexander Island and Berkner Island.

== Northwest ==
Thurston Island in north of map

Glacier flowing north, to the west of Noville Peninsula, from west to east

=== Foley Glacier ===
71.9666667°S 101.1666667°W. Glacier about 4 nautical miles (7.4 km; 4.6 mi) long flowing north from the western end of Thurston Island just east of Cape Petersen. Named by the United States Advisory Committee on Antarctic Names (US-ACAN) after Kevin M. Foley, United States Geological Survey (USGS), Reston, Virginia, computer specialist, team member of the Glaciological and Coastal-Change Maps of Antarctica Project.

=== Sessums Glacier ===
72°S 100.55°W. A glacier flowing into the head of Henry Inlet on the north side of Thurston Island. Named by US-ACAN after Lieutenant Commander Walter Sessums, helicopter pilot in the Eastern Group of United States Navy (United States Navy) Operation Highjump, which obtained aerial photographs of Thurston Island and adjacent coastal areas, 1946-47.

=== Rexford Glacier ===
72.0833333°S 100.0666667°W. A glacier flowing northeast into the head of Wagoner Inlet on the north side of Thurston Island. Named by US-ACAN after Aviation Radioman Phillip W. Rexford, PBM Mariner aircrewman in the Eastern Group of United States Navy (United States Navy) Operation Highjump, which obtained aerial photographs of this glacier and adjoining coastal areas, 1946-47.

=== Litz Glacier ===
72.1166667°S 99.0666667°W. A glacier flowing northeast from the vicinity of Smith Peak and Litz Bluff in north-central Thurston Island. The glacier enters the west part of Peale Inlet north of Guy Peaks. Named by Advisory Committee on Antarctic Names (US-ACAN) after A.K. Litz, Chief Photographer's Mate in the Eastern Group of Operation Highjump, which obtained aerial photographs of this glacier and adjacent coastal areas, 1946-47.

=== Robbins Glacier ===
72.1666667°S 98.6833333°W. A broad glacier flowing into the head of Peale Inlet on the north side of Thurston Island. Named by Advisory Committee on Antarctic Names (US-ACAN) after Aviation Radarman James Haskin Robbins of the Eastern Group of United States Navy (United States Navy) Operation Highjump, aircrewman in the PBM Mariner seaplane that crashed on adjacent Noville Peninsula, 30 December 1946. His energy and initiative contributed to the well-being of six survivors who were rescued 12 January 1947 (Ball Peninsula, Mount Howell, q.v.).

== Noville Peninsula ==
From north to south

=== Sikorski Glacier ===
71°44′S 98°30′W. Small glacier in the northeast part of the Noville Peninsula. It flows northeast to the Bellingshausen Sea between Mount Palmer and Mount Feury. First roughly delineated from air photos taken by United States Navy Operation Highjump (OpHjp), 1946-47. Named by US-ACAN for Stephen Sikorski, electronics technician on the USS Glacier, who assisted in setting up an automatic weather station on Thurston Island during the United States Navy Bellingshausen Sea Expedition in February 1960.

=== Frankenfield Glacier ===
71°46′S 98°18′W. Small glacier in the northeast part of Noville Peninsula. It flows east-northeast to Bellingshausen Sea between Mount Feury and Mulroy Island. First roughly delineated from air photos taken by United States Navy OpHjp in December 1946. Named by US-ACAN for Lieutenant (j.g.) Chester Frankenfield, meteorologist on the United States Navy Bellingshausen Sea Expedition, who established an automatic weather station on Thurston Island in February 1960.

=== Pelter Glacier ===
71.95°S 98.3666667°W. A glacier about 5 nautical miles (9.3 km; 5.8 mi) long, flowing from the east side of the Noville Peninsula into the west side of Murphy Inlet. Delineated from air photos taken by United States Navy (United States Navy) Squadron VX-6 in January 1960. Named by Advisory Committee on Antarctic Names (US-ACAN) for J.A. Pelter, aerial photographer with the Byrd Antarctic Expedition (ByrdAE) in 1933-35.

== Northeast ==
Glacier to the east of Noville Peninsula on the north side of the island, from west to east

=== Warr Glacier ===
72.1833333°S 98.3166667°W. A broad glacier flowing north into the southwest arm of Murphy Inlet. Named by Advisory Committee on Antarctic Names (US-ACAN) after William Warr, Aviation Machinist's Mate in the Eastern Group of United States Navy (United States Navy) Operation Highjump, 1946-47. Warr and five others survived the 30 December 1946 crash of a PBM Mariner seaplane on adjacent Noville Peninsula.

=== Mincer Glacier ===
72.1666667°S 97.9166667°W. A broad glacier flowing from Zuhn Bluff into the southeast arm of Murphy Inlet on the north side of Thurston Island. Named by Advisory Committee on Antarctic Names (US-ACAN) after Lieutenant Dale F. Mincer, co-pilot of PBM Mariner aircraft in the Eastern Group of United States Navy (United States Navy) Operation Highjump, which obtained aerial photographs of Thurston Island and adjacent coastal areas, 1946-47.

=== Goff Glacier ===
72.2333333°S 97.4333333°W. A broad glacier flowing from Parker Peak into the head of Koether Inlet on the north side of Thurston Island. Named by Advisory Committee on Antarctic Names (US-ACAN) after Lieutenant (jg) Robert G. Goff, co-pilot of PBM Mariner aircraft in the Eastern Group of United States Navy (United States Navy) Operation Highjump, which obtained aerial photographs of Thurston Island and adjacent coastal areas, 1946-47.

=== Payne Glacier ===
71.9166667°S 96.7°W. A glacier in the north part of Evans Peninsula, Thurston Island. It flows into the sea east of Cape Walden. Named by Advisory Committee on Antarctic Names (US-ACAN) after Photographer's Mate J.B. Payne, aircrewman in the Eastern Group of United States Navy (United States Navy) Operation Highjump, which obtained aerial photographs of Thurston Island and adjacent coastal areas, 1946-47.

=== Deadmond Glacier ===
71°58′S 96°20′W. Glacier about 6 nautical miles (11 km; 6.9 mi) long, flowing from the east side of Evans Peninsula on Thurston Island into Cadwalader Inlet. Discovered by the United States Navy Bellingshausen Sea Expedition in February 1960. Named by US-ACAN for Lieutenant Commander Robert B. Deadmond, executive officer of the USS Burton Island, forming part of this expedition.

=== Marck Glacier ===
72.2666667°S 97.0333333°W. A glacier flowing into the southwest extremity of Cadwalader Inlet on the north side of Thurston Island. Named by Advisory Committee on Antarctic Names (US-ACAN) after Aviation Machinist's Mate George H. Marck, aircrewman in the Eastern Group of United States Navy (United States Navy) Operation Highjump, which obtained aerial photographs of Thurston Island and adjacent coastal areas, 1946-47.

=== Mahaffey Glacier ===
72.3°S 96.4333333°W. A glacier flowing into the head of Morgan Inlet at the east end of Thurston Island. Named by Advisory Committee on Antarctic Names (US-ACAN) after J.S. Mahaffey, Photographer's Mate in the Eastern Group of United States Navy (United States Navy) Operation Highjump, which obtained aerial photographs of Thurston Island and adjacent coastal areas, 1946-47.

== Southwest coast ==
Glaciers to the west of Von der Wall Point, from west to east:

=== Kannheiser Glacier ===
72°10′S 101°52′W. A glacier about 4 nautical miles (7.4 km; 4.6 mi) long, lying 12 nautical miles (22 km; 14 mi) east-southeast of Cape Flying Fish on Thurston Island and flowing south into Abbot Ice Shelf. First delineated from air photos taken by United States Navy OpHjp in December 1946. Named by US-ACAN for Lieutenant Commander William Kannheiser, United States Navy, helicopter pilot aboard the USS Glacier, who explored and photographed new Thurston Island features in February 1960.

=== Craft Glacier ===
72°11′S 101°33′W. A valley glacier about 5 nautical miles (9.3 km; 5.8 mi) long, lying west of Hendersin Knob on Thurston Island and flowing south to Abbot Ice Shelf in Peacock Sound. First delineated from air photos taken by United States Navy OpHjp in December 1946. Named by US-ACAN for Ens. Charles Craft, United States Navy, helicopter pilot on USS Glacier who made exploratory flights at Thurston Island in February 1960.

=== Rochray Glacier ===
72°11′S 101°21′W. A glacier about 5 nautical miles (9.3 km; 5.8 mi) long, located just east of Hendersin Knob on Thurston Island and flowing south to Abbot Ice Shelf in Peacock Sound. First delineated from air photos taken by United States Navy OpHjp in December 1946. Named by US-ACAN for Lieutenant (j.g.) Samuel Rochray, United States Navy, helicopter pilot on USS Glacier in February 1960, who made several flights in which new parts of Thurston Island were discovered.

=== Cox Clacier ===
72°11′S 101°15′W. A small glacier immediately east of Rochray Glacier on Thurston Island, flowing south to Abbot Ice Shelf in Peacock Sound. Delineated from air photos taken by United States Navy Squadron VX-6 in January 1960. Named by US-ACAN for Lieutenant (j-g.) Jerry G. Cox, United States Navy, helicopter pilot aboard the USS Burton Island, who made exploratory flights to Thurston Island in February 1960.

=== Hale Glacier ===
72°12′S 100°48′W. A glacier about 6 nautical miles (11 km; 6.9 mi) long, located just east of Mount Simpson on Thurston Island and flowing southwest to Abbot Ice Shelf in Peacock Sound. Delineated from air photos taken by United States Navy Squadron VX-6 in January 1960. Named by US-ACAN for Lieutenant (j-g.) Bill J. Hale, United States Navy, helicopter pilot aboard USS Burton Island who made exploratory flights to Thurston Island in February 1960.

=== Myers Glacier ===
72°14′S 100°18′W. A valley glacier about 7 nautical miles (13 km; 8.1 mi) long, flowing southwest from Mount Noxon on Thurston Island to Abbot Ice Shelf in Peacock Sound. Delineated from aerial photographs taken by United States Navy Squadron VX-6 in January 1960. Named by US-ACAN for Lieutenant (j.g.) Dale P. Myers, United States Navy, helicopter pilot aboard USS Burton Island who made exploratory flights to Thurston Island in February 1960.

=== Bellisime Glacier ===
72.3166667°S 99.8833333°W. A glacier about 4 nautical miles (7.4 km; 4.6 mi) long flowing south from Thurston Island east of Myers Glacier. Named by Advisory Committee on Antarctic Names (US-ACAN) after Lynda B. Bellisime, United States Geological Survey (USGS), Flagstaff, Arizona, part of the United States Geological Survey (USGS) team that compiled the 1:5,000,000-scale Advanced Very High Resolution Radiometer maps of Antarctica and the 1: 250,000-scale Landsat TM image maps of the Siple Coast area in the 1990s.

=== Bearman Glacier ===
72.35°S 99.1666667°W. A glacier whose head is east of Mount Howell in central Thurston Island. The glacier flows south into Schwartz Cove on the south side of the island. Named by Advisory Committee on Antarctic Names (US-ACAN) after F.O. Bearman, Photographer's Mate in the Eastern Group of United States Navy (United States Navy) Operation Highjump, which obtained aerial photographs of this glacier and adjacent coastal areas, 1946-47.

=== Bulbur Glacier ===
72.45°S 98.55°W. A glacier in south-central Thurston Island; it flows south along the west side of Boker Rocks into O'Dowd Cove. Named by Advisory Committee on Antarctic Names (US-ACAN) after E.R. Bulbur, Photographer's Mate in the Eastern Group of United States Navy (United States Navy) Operation Highjump, which obtained aerial photographs of Thurston Island and adjacent coastal areas, 1946-47.

== Southeast coast ==
Glaciers to the east of Von der Wall Point, from west to east:

=== Hlubeck Glacier ===
72.5°S 97.15°W. A glacier 9 nautical miles (17 km; 10 mi) west of Long Glacier in southeast Thurston Island. It flows south along the east side of Shelton head into Abbot Ice Shelf. Named by Advisory Committee on Antarctic Names (US-ACAN) after Aviation Radioman Vernon R. Hlubeck, PBM Mariner aircrewman in the Eastern Group of United States Navy (United States Navy) Operation Highjump, which obtained aerial photographs of Thurston Island and adjoining coastal areas, 1946-47.

=== Long Glacier ===
72°30′S 96°47′W. Glacier about 8 nautical miles (15 km; 9.2 mi) long in the southeast part of Thurston Island. It flows south to Abbot Ice Shelf, 14 nautical miles (26 km; 16 mi) west of Harrison Nunatak. Mapped by USGS from surveys and United States Navy air photos, 1960-66. Named by US-ACAN for Fred A. Long, Jr., aviation machinist of United States Navy Squadron VX-6, who wintered at Little American V in 1957 and was in Antarctica in the 1960-61 and 1962-63 seasons.

=== Savage Glacier ===
72°25′S 96°05′W. Glacier at the east end of Thurston Island, lying south of Tierney Peninsula and flowing east to Seraph Bay. Discovered on helicopter flights from the USS Glacier and Burton Island by personnel of the United States Navy Bellingshausen Sea Expedition in February 1960. Named by US-ACAN for Lieutenant John Savage, United States Navy, Dental Officer aboard the Glacier who assisted in establishing geodetic control points in the area.

=== Levko Glacier ===
72.4166667°S 96.0333333°W. A glacier flowing from Pallid Crest to the east end of Thurston Island. It enters Seraph Bay between Tierney Peninsula and Simpson Bluff. Named by Advisory Committee on Antarctic Names (US-ACAN) after G. Levko, Photographer's Mate in the Eastern Group of United States Navy (United States Navy) Operation Highjump, which obtained aerial photographs of Thurston Island and adjacent coastal areas, 1946-47.

== Sources ==
- Alberts, Fred G., ed. (1995), Geographic Names of the Antarctic (PDF) (2 ed.), United States Board on Geographic Names This article incorporates public domain material from websites or documents of the United States Board on Geographic Names.
- "Bearman Glacier", Geographic Names Information System, United States Geological Survey, United States Department of the Interior
- "Bellisime Glacier", Geographic Names Information System, United States Geological Survey, United States Department of the Interior
- "Bulbur Glacier", Geographic Names Information System, United States Geological Survey, United States Department of the Interior
- "Foley Glacier", Geographic Names Information System, United States Geological Survey, United States Department of the Interior
- "Goff Glacier", Geographic Names Information System, United States Geological Survey, United States Department of the Interior
- "Hlubeck Glacier", Geographic Names Information System, United States Geological Survey, United States Department of the Interior
- "Levko Glacier", Geographic Names Information System, United States Geological Survey, United States Department of the Interior
- "Litz Glacier", Geographic Names Information System, United States Geological Survey, United States Department of the Interior
- "Mahaffey Glacier", Geographic Names Information System, United States Geological Survey, United States Department of the Interior
- "Marck Glacier", Geographic Names Information System, United States Geological Survey, United States Department of the Interior
- "Mincer Glacier", Geographic Names Information System, United States Geological Survey, United States Department of the Interior
- "Payne Glacier", Geographic Names Information System, United States Geological Survey, United States Department of the Interior
- "Pelter Glacier", Geographic Names Information System, United States Geological Survey, United States Department of the Interior
- "Rexford Glacier", Geographic Names Information System, United States Geological Survey, United States Department of the Interior
- "Robbins Glacier", Geographic Names Information System, United States Geological Survey, United States Department of the Interior
- "Sessums Glacier", Geographic Names Information System, United States Geological Survey, United States Department of the Interior
- "Warr Glacier", Geographic Names Information System, United States Geological Survey, United States Department of the Interior

This article incorporates public domain material from websites or documents of the United States Geological Survey.
