= Howell Mountain =

Howell Mountain may refer to:

- Howell Mountain, California
- Howell Mountain AVA
- Howell Mountain, a summit of the San Francisco Bay Area

== See also ==
- Mount Howell, a mountain of Ellsworth Land
