= George Otto Noville =

Aviation pioneer (1890–1963)

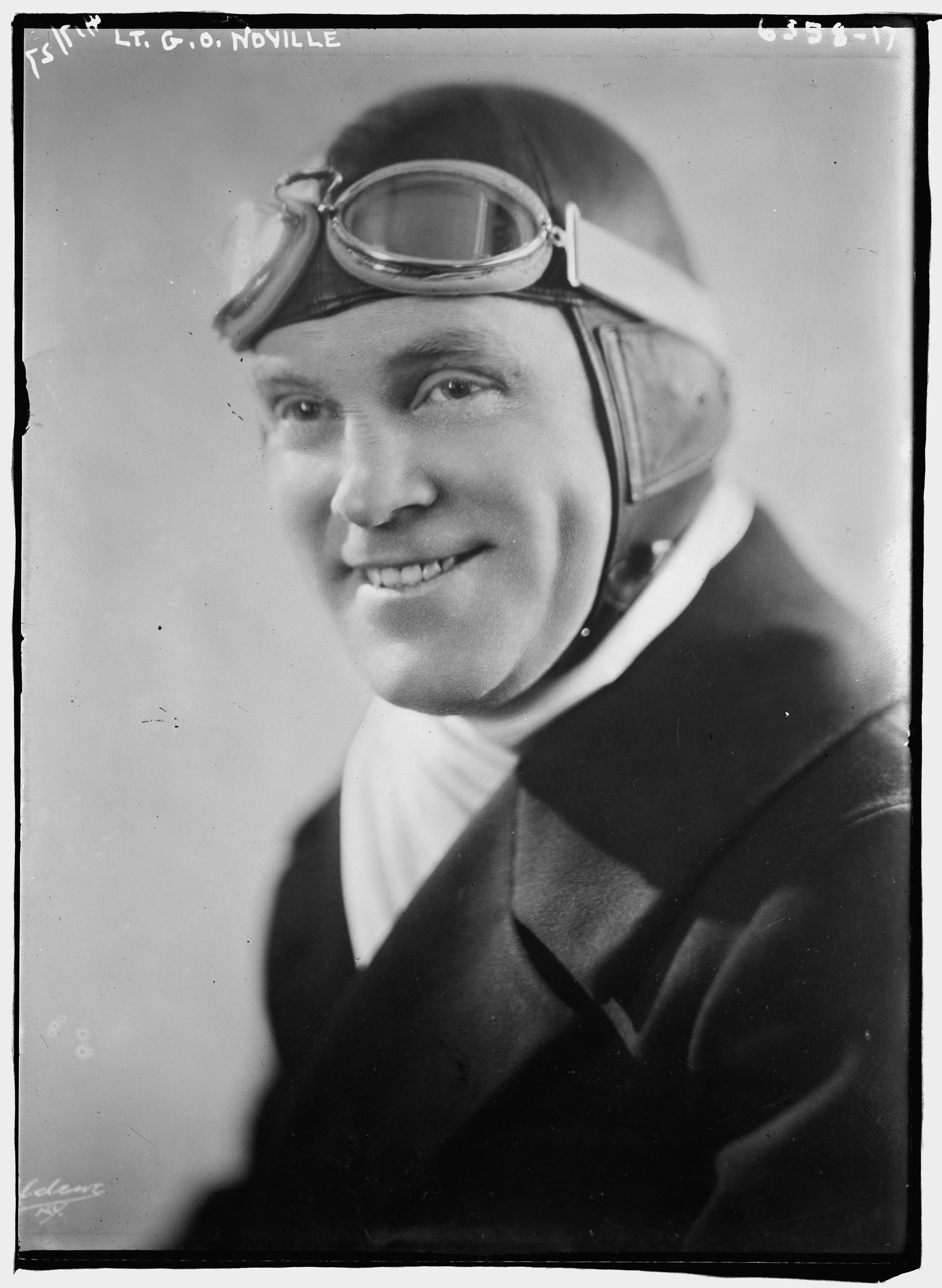
George Otto Noville

George Otto Noville (April 24, 1890 – January 1, 1963), also known as "Noville" and "Rex," was a pioneer in polar and trans-Atlantic aviation in the 1920s, and winner of the Distinguished Flying Cross. He served with Commander Richard E. Byrd on the historic (but controversial) 1926 flight to the North Pole, as third in command. He was flight engineer on the America (the third plane to fly non stop over the Atlantic Ocean), and was executive officer of Byrd's Second Antarctic Exploration 1933-35. Mount Noville and Noville Peninsula in Antarctica are named after him.

== Biography ==
George Noville was born on April 24, 1890, in Cleveland, Ohio. He was the son of Otto J. Noville , a rich and well-known hat manufacturer. He was an officer in the United States Naval Reserve and was promoted to the rank of lieutenant commander on December 17, 1927.

=== Transatlantic flight ===
In 1927, in a trimotor Fokker C-2 monoplane, named America he flew with Richard E. Byrd, Bernt Balchen, and Bert Acosta on their record-setting transatlantic flight.

In 1927, Byrd decided to partner with Floyd Bennett (his co-pilot on the North Pole flight), and attempt to win the Orteig Prize which offered a $25,000 reward for the first non-stop flight from New York City to Paris. The plane chosen for this flight was a Fokker C-2 monoplane named America. George O. Noville was selected as the flight and fuel engineer. On April 20, 1927, during a test flight in Hasbrouck Heights, New Jersey, the plane somersaulted when landing, breaking Byrd's arm and knocking him unconscious. The crash also injured Bennett and Noville required surgery for internal injuries. A fourth person on America, aircraft designer Anthony Fokker, was not injured.

Fokker later told Bennett that he should have refused to conduct the test flight with Byrd, Bennett, and Noville on board because there was no load in the rear of the plane. As a result, the plane was nose-heavy.

While Byrd and his crew regrouped from the accident, Charles Lindbergh won the Orteig Prize when he landed in Paris on May 21, 1927. According to The Big Aviation Book for Boys by Richard E. Byrd, Noville was one of the group who gathered to wish Lindbergh godspeed right before his historic flight.

After several delays, Byrd's America took off for Paris on June 29, 1927, with Noville and two relief pilots, Bert Acosta and Bernt Balchen. The weather was terrible during the flight. Rain and strong winds made navigating near impossible. When America reached Paris after 40 hours, a heavy fog prevented it from landing. Byrd and his crew flew around Paris for about six hours waiting for the fog to lift. When it failed to do so, they flew west and ditched themselves in the ocean near the beach of Ver-sur-Mer (later known as the Gold Beach sector of D-Day, in Normandy) without fatalities on July 1, 1927. Byrd, Acosta, Balchen and Noville ended up entering France in a rubber life raft as America sank after landing on the water.

Popular Science magazine, August 1928, featured an extensive article with photos about this flight, "Dick Byrd— Adventurer. The Absorbing Story of the America's Flight across the Atlantic – a Valiant Escape from Death in Blinding Fog"

Upon return to the U.S., Byrd and Noville were awarded the Distinguished Flying Cross by Secretary of the Navy Wilbur on July 19. On November 14, Noville and other "Air Heroes of 1927" were honored at the White House by President Calvin Coolidge.

Noville once again joined an adventure with Byrd, serving as executive officer of Byrd's Second Antarctic Exploration 1933-35.

=== Personal life and death ===
Noville was married four times. He married Violet E. Wade in 1914, and Lilian Grace MacMurchey in 1918. His third wife was Sigrid Erika Matteson (1893-1976) in 1926. He married his fourth and final wife, Lucy Vacheron, in 1953.

Noville committed suicide by gunshot on January 1, 1963.

== Legacy ==
The Noville Peninsula (71°56′S 98°35′W), a high ice-covered peninsula about 30 nautical miles (60 km) long, between Peale and Murphy Inlets on the north side of Thurston Island, and Mount Noville (86°26′S 146°10′W), in the Queen Maud Mountains, were named for Noville.
