= Bernt Balchen =

United States Army Air Forces officer (1899–1973)

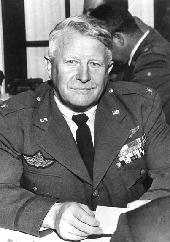
- Bernt Balchen, c. 1950
- Born: 23 October 1899; Tveit, Kristiansand, Norway
- Died: 17 October 1973 (aged 73); Mount Kisco, New York, U.S.
- Occupations: Aviator, navigator, engineer, military leader
- Spouses: Emmy Alvhilde (née Sorlie), Inger (née Engelbrethsen), Audrey (née Schipper)
- Children: Bernt Jr, Lauritz
- Parent(s): Lauritz, Dagny (née Dietrechson)

Bernt Balchen (23 October 1899 – 17 October 1973) was a Norwegian pioneer polar aviator, navigator, aircraft mechanical engineer and military leader. A Norwegian native, he later became an American citizen and was a recipient of the Distinguished Flying Cross.

His service in the U.S. Army Air Forces during World War II made use of his Arctic exploration expertise to help the Allies over Scandinavia and Northern Europe. After the war, Balchen continued to be an influential leader with the U.S. Air Force, as well as a highly regarded private consultant in projects involving the Arctic and aviation.

== Early years ==
The son of a country doctor, Balchen was born at the farm Myren in Tveit, just outside Kristiansand, Norway. After having finished Norwegian middle school in 1916, he attended a Forestry School from 1917 to 1918. Next he enrolled in the French Foreign Legion, and his unit was assigned to the Verdun front in World War I. In 1918, before seeing action, Balchen was recalled to Norway. He transferred to the Norwegian Army, and was sent to an artillery school, where he graduated shortly after.

Under an assumed name, Balchen fought as a cavalryman with the White Guards in the Finnish Civil War. During a cavalry charge, his horse was shot from under him and he was left for dead on the battlefield. Having received serious wounds that required a lengthy convalescence, Balchen turned to an early interest in athletics and trained strenuously as a boxer to represent Norway in the 1920 Olympics. Besides being a championship boxer, he was also an expert marksman and an accomplished skier. Balchen was very knowledgeable about wilderness and northern survival, skills that he would later exploit.

While waiting for his acceptance as an Olympian, Balchen received word that he also qualified for flight training, resulting in his decision to become a pilot in the Royal Norwegian Navy Air Service in 1921.

== Aviation ==
=== Amundsen-Ellsworth Relief Expedition ===
Gaining recognition as an accomplished pilot, the Norwegian Defense Department selected Balchen in 1925 to become part of the Amundsen-Ellsworth Relief Expedition, a rescue mission for the missing explorer Roald Amundsen under the command of Flight Lieutenant Lützow-Holm. The expedition consisting of two seaplanes, was sent to Spitsbergen on the Svalbard archipelago. This assignment would make Amundsen, already a family friend, a lifelong friend and confidant.

During the next year, Balchen became part of a ground party led by Lieutenant J. Höver, providing technical services for the Roald Amundsen, Lincoln Ellsworth and Umberto Nobile Arctic Expedition, ultimately a successful attempt to fly the lighter-than-air airship, Norge, over the North Pole from Svalbard to Teller, Alaska. Although he was a highly regarded mechanic, Balchen's main role was to provide survival training to the Italian crew members as well as to teach them to ski. In a last-minute decision by Amundsen, he was not chosen to be on the record-breaking dirigible flight as Nobile was in charge of picking the crew, which already had a complement of 23.

=== Support of Byrd's North Pole flight ===
After observing the crash of the Fokker trimotor, Josephine Ford, belonging to one of his competitors, Lieutenant Commander Richard E. Byrd of the U.S. Navy, Amundsen asked Balchen to help in preparing the airplane for a flight to the North Pole. Under Balchen's supervision, the damaged aircraft skis were repaired with improvised wooden supports from a lifeboat's oars and some survival gear was loaned to Byrd for the flight. This enabled Byrd and his pilot, Floyd Bennett to continue with their attempt to fly to the North Pole and back on 9 May 1926.

In 1926, under the sponsorship of Joseph Wanamaker, Balchen officially joined the Byrd party, as the co-pilot and navigator, with the pilot Floyd Bennett, flying the Josephine Ford on a tour to more than 50 American cities, thereby promoting commercial aviation as a safe, reliable and practical means of transportation. Following this tour Balchen was hired by Anthony Fokker as a test pilot for the Fokker Aircraft Company at the Teterboro Airport, New Jersey.

=== Trans-Atlantic Flight ===
On 29 June 1927, Balchen, as the co-pilot with the chief pilot Bert Acosta; the flight engineer, George Otto Noville and the navigator and air flight organizer, Commander Byrd, flew a U.S. Post Office airmail aircraft, Fokker trimotor America, across the Atlantic Ocean from Roosevelt Field on Long Island.

Due to Acosta's reported lack of ability to successfully fly via aircraft instruments, and the foul weather for most of this flight, Balchen did most of the flying. Bad weather and low visibility over France made landing at the Paris airport impractical, despite their repeated attempts. When their aircraft was running low on aviation gasoline, Balchen decided to fly back to the western coast of France, and there he landed the Fokker Trimotor —-which was not designed for a water landing —- on the ocean with no injury to the occupants.

=== Bremen rescue ===
In late April 1928 the three-man crew of the aircraft Bremen was stranded on Greenly Island, Canada following the first east to west non-stop flight across the Atlantic Ocean from Europe. Balchen and Floyd Bennett flew a Ford Trimotor to provide relief to the downed pilots. Bennett had developed pneumonia following a previous crash. Bennett succumbed to his fever while in flight on 25 April. Balchen flew the remaining eight hours, and he was paid $10,000 for the effort. Balchen donated the money to Bennett's widow.

=== South Pole flight ===
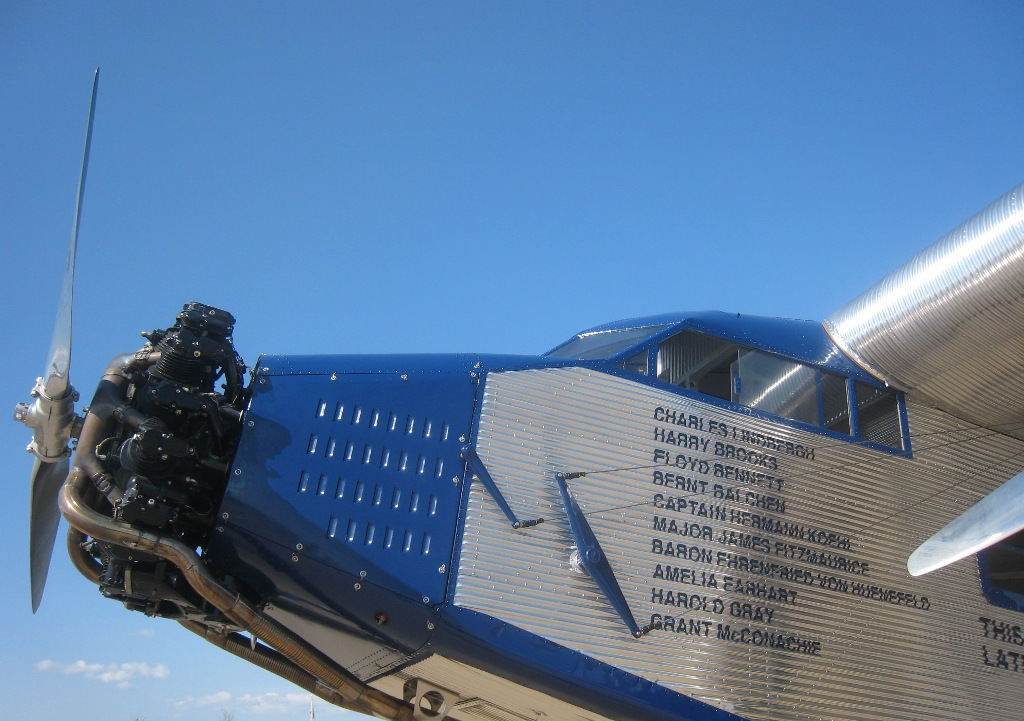
A Ford Trimotor once flown by Balchen

On 28–29 November 1929, as the pilot of a modified Ford 4-AT Trimotor named Floyd Bennett, Balchen became one of the first four men to fly over the South Pole. Balchen was the chief pilot, and he was accompanied by Harold June, his co-pilot and radio operator; Ashley McKinley, the flight's photographer; and Commander Richard E. Byrd, the plane's navigator and leader of his First Antarctic Expedition. The flight was considered one of the greatest aviation achievements in history.

=== Amelia Earhart ===
Due to his reputation as a polar, transatlantic and aviation expert, Balchen was hired in 1931 by Amelia Earhart as a technical adviser for a planned solo transatlantic flight. In an attempt to throw off the press, Earhart turned over her repaired Lockheed Vega to Balchen who was assumed to be planning an Antarctic flight. Balchen flew the Vega to the Fokker Aircraft Company plant at Hasbrouck Heights, New Jersey. There, he and the mechanics Frank Nagle and Eddie Gorski reconditioned the Vega for the upcoming record flight. Its fuselage was strengthened to carry extra fuel tanks that were added to provide a 420-gallon capacity, and some additional flight instruments were also installed. After modifications had been made, Earhart flew this Lockheed Vega across the Atlantic Ocean on 20 May 1932, landing in Ireland. (Note: Quote: "Please tell Bernt Balchen how deeply I appreciate all that he did to make this flight possible. Of course he is about the finest flyer and technical expert in the world but beyond that it was his confidence in my ability which helped so much." Amelia Earhart, 22 May 1932.)

=== Norway ===
In the mid-1930s, Balchen returned to Norway to work with Norwegian Air Lines. Later, he was part of a team to create a Nordic Postal Union, and as war seemed inevitable in Europe, Balchen helped negotiate an aviation treaty with the United States. Balchen also worked with the airplane, The Valkyrien.

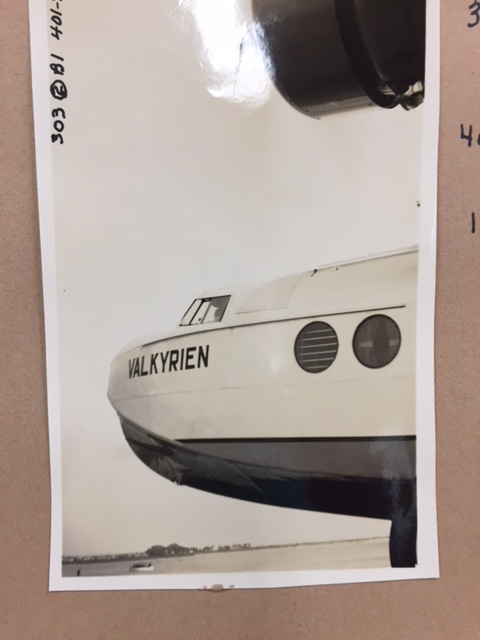
Image of Balchen's plane

== World War II ==
In 1939, Balchen was in Helsinki, working on a contract to provide U.S. fighter aircraft to Finland, when the Soviet attack on Finland took place. Enlisting with the Norwegian Air Force, he made his way to the United States on a crucial mission to negotiate "matters pertaining to aircraft ordnance and ammunition with the question of the Norwegian Government's possible purchase of such materials in the United States of America."

With his status of holding dual Norwegian and American citizenship and his extensive contacts in the aviation industry, his instruction from the Norwegian Government-in-exile in London changed to a new directive: to set up a training camp and school for expatriate Norwegian airmen and soldiers in Canada. Balchen negotiated directly with Canadian government officials to obtain an agreement to use available airport facilities at the Toronto Island airport on Lake Ontario known as "Little Norway". During the war, over 2,500 Norwegian aviators of all categories: pilots, navigators and mechanics, were trained in the various bases of "Little Norway".

During 1940, with the "Little Norway" facilities under construction and his administrative duties taken over by others, Balchen requested permission from the Norwegian Air Force to fly ferrying missions for the British, teaming with Clyde Pangborn, a contemporary record-breaking pilot of the era. In early 1941, while engaged in a ferrying mission, and on a layover in the Philippines, a representative of General Henry "Hap" Arnold sought out Balchen. Arnold asked Balchen to join the US Army Air Forces as a colonel to oversee the establishment of the USAAF polar airfields at Thule, and Sondre Stromfjord, Greenland. These highly secretive bases would serve to ferry fighter aircraft across the Atlantic by air, rather than having to disassemble them and send them overseas by cargo ship. The airfields also served as bases from which long-range Consolidated B-24 Liberator patrol aircraft could fly far out over the North Atlantic Ocean in search of the German Kriegsmarine U-boats that were menacing American, British, and Canadian ships taking war supplies and troops across the ocean in preparation for the then undecided location of the cross-channel invasion of Europe. This latter air base had the code name "Bluie West Eight" during its operational life.

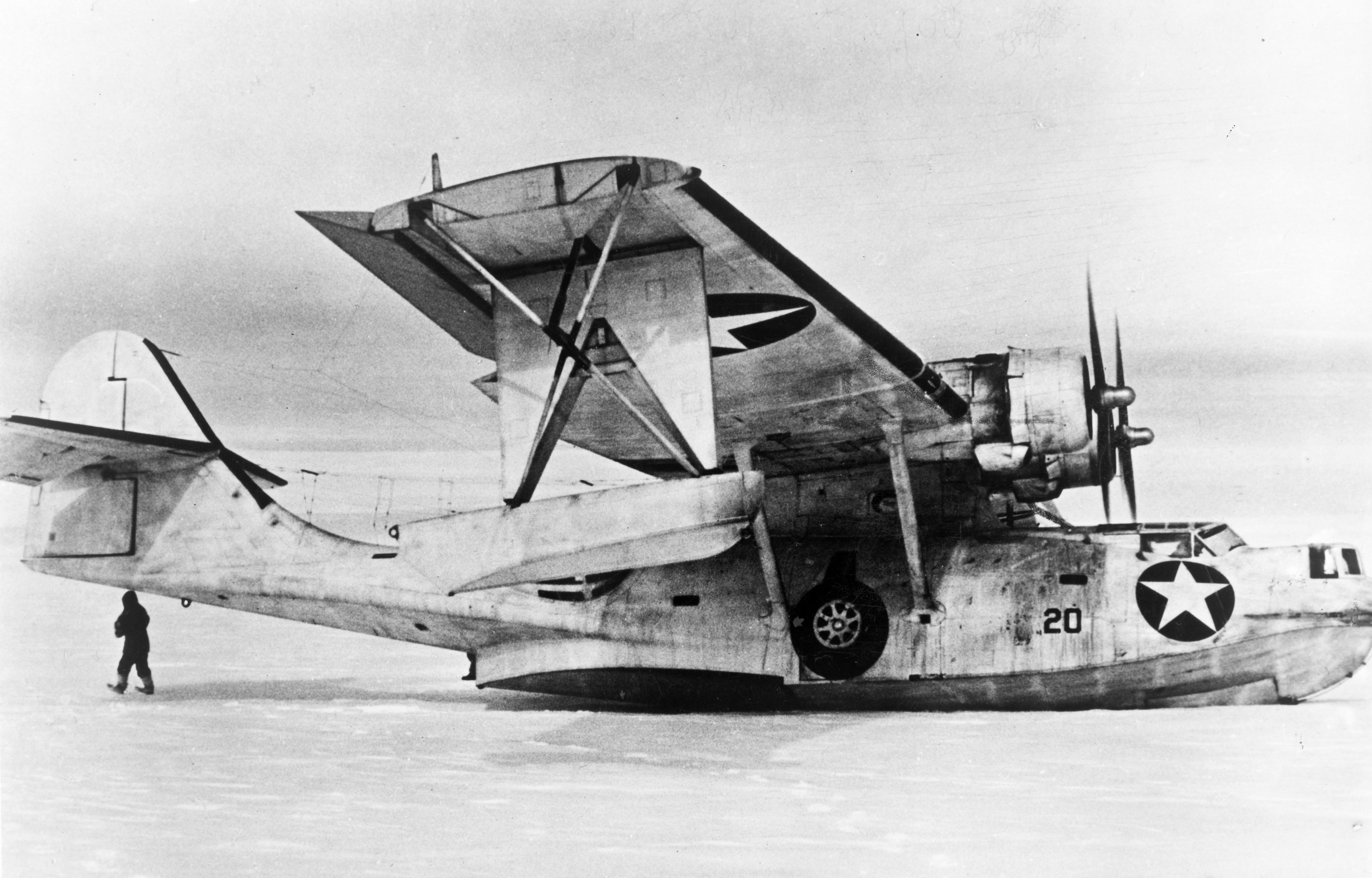
Balchen's Consolidated OA-10 Catalina on the ice in Greenland after a rescue

Between September 1941 and November 1943, Balchen trained his personnel in cold weather survival skills and rescue techniques which enabled them to carry out many rescues of downed airmen on the Greenland icecap. On 25 May 1943, flying in a Boeing B-17 Flying Fortress, Balchen led a bombing raid that destroyed the only German outpost remaining on Greenland, a forward station at Sabine Island on the eastern coast of that island. This destruction hindered the ability of the German armed forces to maintain a presence on Greenland that not only had been used to send deceptive radio messages to Allied aircraft as well as establishing a weather station required to provide accurate weather reports for the German forces operating in the North Atlantic.

Balchen then was posted to the European Theatre to run "Operation Where and When", based at Luleå-Kallax Air Base in northern Sweden. Balchen commanded a clandestine air transport operation, using 10 Douglas C-47s and helped to set up an escape route between the United Kingdom and Sweden that enabled numerous important diplomats and others to flee the Nazis. From March to December 1944, Balchen's "Operation Balder" using six B-24s manned with OSS crews, safely evacuated at least 2,000 Norwegians, 900 American internees and 150 internees of other nationalities from Sweden. Norwegian police troops were also airlifted from Sweden to Finnmark.

The air operation also shipped strategic freight; from July to October 1944, 64 tons of operational supplies such as ammunition were transported from Scotland to the underground in occupied Norway. Life necessities like bales of hay and fodder for livestock were brought to areas in the north of Sweden and Norway, once even paradropping a hospital complete with a doctor and nurse. Between November 1944 and April 1945, Balchen also transported 200 tons of Arctic equipment and operational supplies from England to Sweden that were used to make secret overland transport from Sweden to Norway possible. During winter 1945, Balchen shipped communications equipment into northern Norway that was of inestimable value to the Allied Expeditionary Force's intelligence operations. The leading Norwegian wartime ace Sven Heglund was acting military attaché and served with Balchen, later writing about his time at Kallax. Another Norwegian at Kallax during the same period, who became a good friend, was marine biologist and explorer-to-be Thor Heyerdahl, later of Ra I and II and Kon-Tiki fame.

== Postwar activities ==
1954 interview

From November 1948 to January 1951, Balchen commanded the 10th Rescue Squadron of the U.S. Air Force, which was located in southern Alaska but which operated across all of Alaska and northern Canada rescuing crashed airmen. Balchen led this squadron in the development of the techniques that became widely used in cold weather search and rescues. He was also directly responsible for persuading the U.S. Air Force to purchase the de Havilland Canada DHC-2 Beaver bush aircraft, one that became an important search and rescue aircraft for the Arctic. On 23 May 1949, while commanding the 10th Rescue Squadron, Balchen flew a Douglas C-54 Skymaster from Fairbanks, Alaska, via the North Pole to Thule Air Base, Greenland.

Balchen was primarily responsible for the pioneering and development of the strategic air base at Thule, Greenland, built secretly on his recommendation, in 1951 under severe weather conditions which, by extending the range of the Strategic Air Command, increased the capabilities that made the SAC a significant deterrent to Soviet aggression during the Cold War.

== Post-retirement ==
After retiring from the U.S. Air Force in 1956, Colonel Balchen continued to serve the Air Force on special assignments and aviation and energy industries as a consultant. He joined General Precision Laboratories as a consultant in 1959, as well as working with a host of other companies including Hughes Aircraft, General Dynamics, Canadair and the Electric Boat Company. Working for Canadair in 1966, then the parent company, General Dynamics, from 1966 to 1971, Balchen had authority over projects as diverse as ice-breakers, tankers, new epoxy materials for submarine construction, seagoing electronic weather systems and over-snow vehicles. In 1962, he also worked with the USAF presenting a proposal on the Apogee Intercept Defense System (AIDS) in 1962 and later, was the leading advocate for "Project Iceman", a proposed system of intermediate range ballistic missiles (IRBMs) stationed in Greenland.

Colonel Balchen was among 27 passengers on board the first circumnavigation of the Earth over both poles. The aircraft was a brand-new, chartered Flying Tiger Line Boeing 707-349C jet with U.S. registration N322F, which had been modified with additional fuel tanks installed in the front passenger cabin. The route taken, between 14 and 17 November 1965, was from Honolulu, over the North Pole, to London; Lisbon; Buenos Aires; before flying over the South Pole and continuing on to the last refueling stop at Christchurch before returning to Honolulu. Balchen was the only passenger allowed into the cockpit when the four pilots, who were all qualified Boeing 707 captains, performed four 360-degree loops over the South Geographic Pole. As well as being the first such flight, this would remain the fastest until succeeded by Pan Am Flight 50, a Boeing 747SP with U.S. registration N533PA, on October 28–30, 1977. (October 28, 1977 was the 50th anniversary of Pan Am's first (airmail) flight, from Key West, Florida to Havana, Cuba: about 90 miles.)

As one of the world's foremost Arctic experts, Balchen was sought out by numerous companies and government agencies including Canada and Norway. Balchen was hired as a consultant by Hercules Oil, then Phillips Petroleum and Moran Towing on plans to extract oil from Alaska using pipelines. According to a 1972 article in The Christian Science Monitor, Balchen asserted that "a general warming trend over the North Pole is melting the polar ice cap and may produce an ice-free Arctic Ocean by the year 2000."

In his native Norway, Balchen was a driving force in the establishment of Det Norske Luftfartselskap (D.N.L.) ("The Norwegian Airline Company"), with which he pioneered commercial Europe–US airline flights across the North Pole. D.N.L. later merged with Danish and Swedish airlines into the major carrier Scandinavian Airlines.

== Death and burial ==
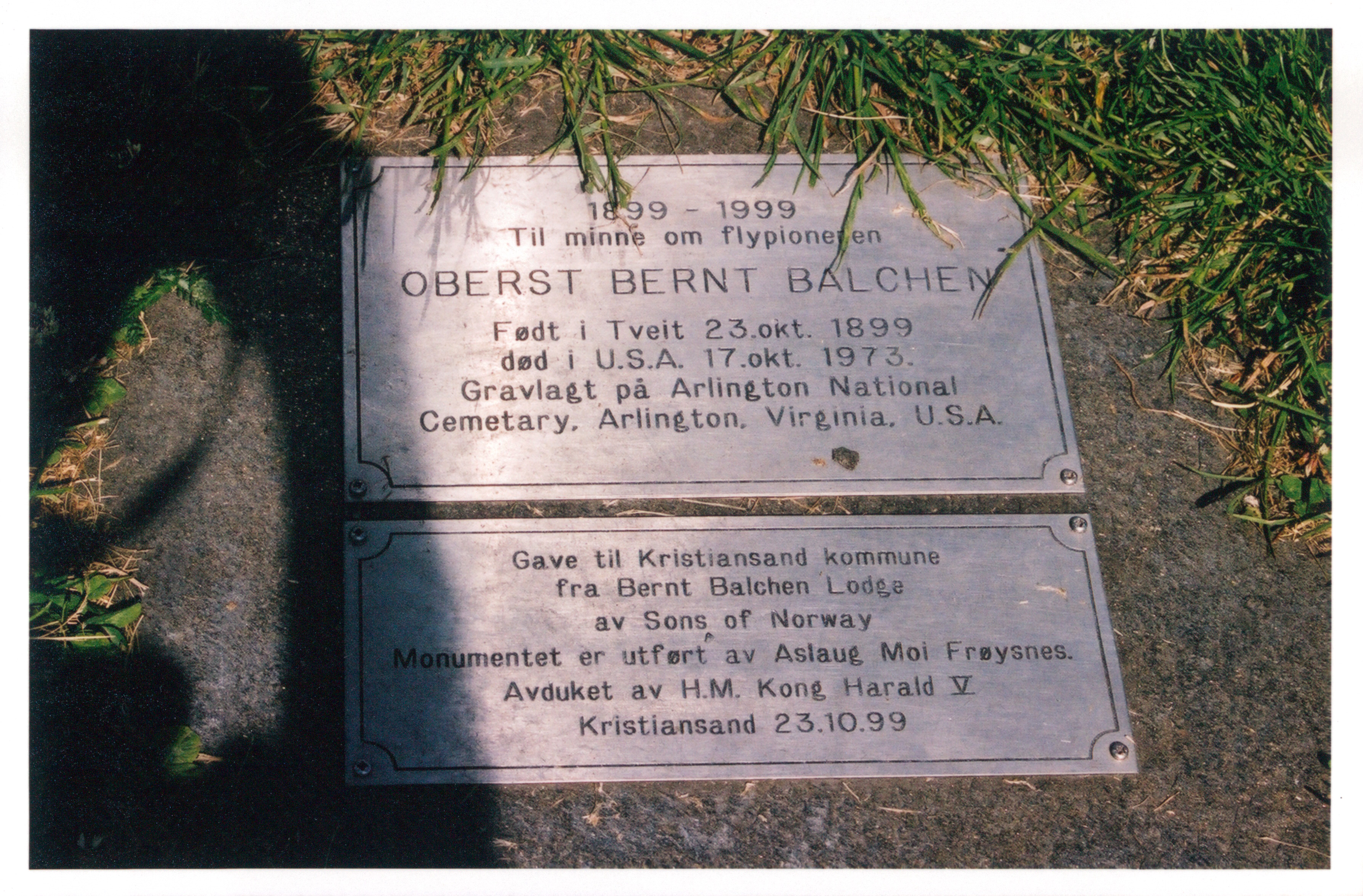
Memorial plaque to Bernt Balchen in Kristiansand

Balchen continued to work in consultancy until his death. In his final year, he was diagnosed with bone cancer, and he died at Mount Kisco, New York in 1973. Balchen was buried at the Arlington National Cemetery in Virginia. He is buried in Section 2, Grave 4969, next to Admiral Richard E. Byrd.

== Honors and tributes ==
Balchen received the Congressional Gold Medal in 1930 and the Harmon Trophy in 1956, both for his pioneering in aviation. He became honorary member of American Polar Society in 1966. The annual "International Aviation Snow Symposium", sponsored by the Northeast (U.S.) Chapter of the American Association of Airport Executives, created the Bernt Balchen Award in his memory in 1976 to recognize airports excelling in snow and ice control. In 1973, Balchen was inducted in the National Aviation Hall of Fame In 1974, Mount Balchen in Alaska was named after him, and there is a Mount Balchen in Antarctica also named in his honor. In 1976, Balchen was inducted into the International Air & Space Hall of Fame. October 23 1999, the centenary of Balchen's birthday, king Harald V unveiled a statue of Balchen in his home town Kristiansand. The Royal Norwegian Air Force’s school in Kjevik has a bronze relief of Balchen, a gift from Sons of Norway. In 2012, when the Norwegian Air Force celebrated their 100 year anniversary, «Norsk Militær Luftmakt 100 år», the first airshow was held at Kjevik outside Kristiansand and named «Bernt Balchen Airshow».

Balchen was also a recipient of the following military decorations:

=== United States decorations and medals ===
- Distinguished Service Medal
- Legion of Merit
- Distinguished Flying Cross
- Soldier's Medal with oak leaf cluster
- Air Medal with five oak leaf clusters
- Army Commendation Medal with two oak leaf clusters
- Byrd Antarctic Expedition Medal
- American Defense Service Medal with star
- American Campaign Medal
- European-African-Middle Eastern Campaign Medal with three campaign stars
- World War II Victory Medal
- National Defense Service Medal

=== International orders and medals ===
- Commander 1st Class The Royal Norwegian Order of St. Olav (Norway's highest civilian decoration)
- Norwegian Aero Club's medal of honor in gold (Norway)
- King Christian X's Liberty Medal (Denmark)
- Victory Medal (France)
- Verdun Medal (France)
- 1939–1945 Star (United Kingdom)
- War Medal 1939–1945 (United Kingdom)

=== Civil awards ===
- New York City Medal of Valor – two awards
- Medal of the City of Paris, gold (vermeil)

== See also ==
- Adventurers' Club of New York
- Aviation in Norway
- Balchen Glacier
- Marie Byrd Land
