= Mount Howell =

Mountain in Ellsworth Land, Antarctica

Map of Thurston Island.

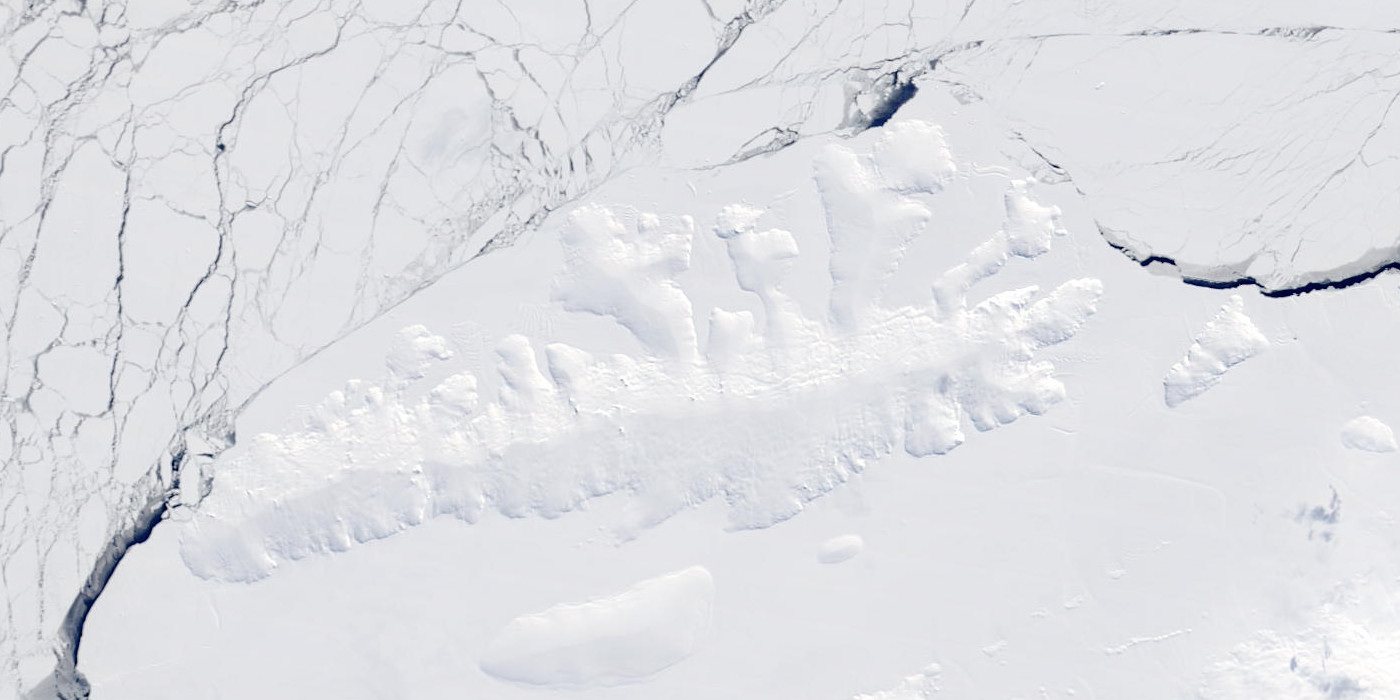
Satellite image of Thurston Island.

Mount Howell (72°14′S 99°3′W) is a mountain 3 nautical miles (6 km) south-southwest of Mount Borgeson in the Walker Mountains of Thurston Island, Antarctica. It was named by the Advisory Committee on Antarctic Names after Lieutenant Commander John D. Howell, a pilot and airplane commander in the Eastern Group of U.S. Navy Operation Highjump, which obtained aerial photographs of this mountain and coastal areas adjacent to Thurston Island in 1946–47. Commander Howell landed a PBM Mariner seaplane in the open water of eastern Glacier Bight on 11 January 1947 to rescue six survivors of a 30 December Mariner crash on Noville Peninsula.

== See also ==
- Mountains in Antarctica

== Maps ==
- Thurston Island – Jones Mountains. 1:500000 Antarctica Sketch Map. US Geological Survey, 1967.
- Antarctic Digital Database (ADD). Scale 1:250000 topographic map of Antarctica. Scientific Committee on Antarctic Research (SCAR). Since 1993, regularly upgraded and updated.
