= Sikorski Glacier =

Glacier in Antarctica

- Map of Thurston Island

- Location within Antarctica
- Location: Ellsworth Land
- Coordinates: 71°49′00″S 98°24′00″W
- Thickness: unknown
- Terminus: Bellingshausen Sea
- Status: unknown

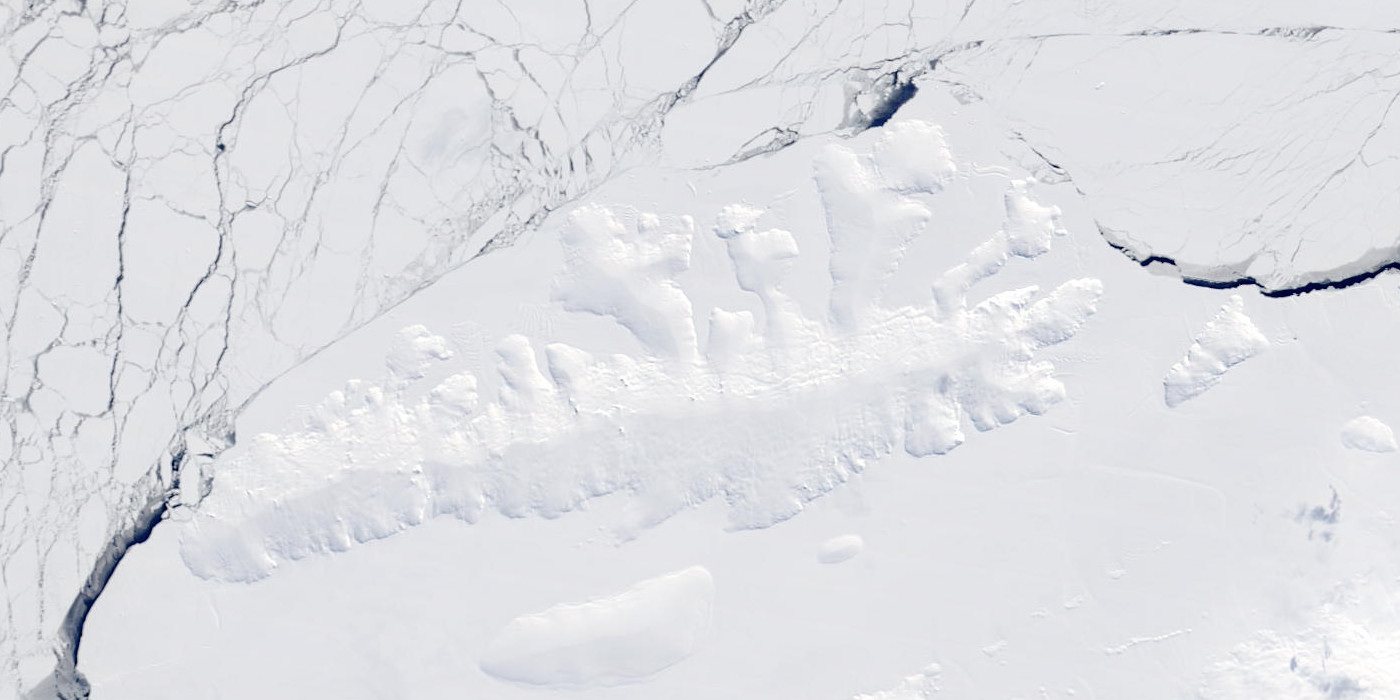
Satellite image of Thurston Island

The Sikorski Glacier is a small glacier in the north-eastern part of the Noville Peninsula, Thurston Island, Ellsworth Land, Antarctica. It flows north-east to the Bellingshausen Sea between Mount Palmer and Mount Feury. It was first roughly delineated from aerial photos taken by the USN's Operation Highjump in 1946–47. It was named by the Advisory Committee on Antarctic Names (US-ACAN) for Stephen Sikorski, electronics technician on USS Glacier, who assisted in setting up an automatic weather station on Thurston Island during the USN's Bellingshausen Sea Expedition in February 1960.

== Important Bird Area ==
A 316 ha site on fast ice north of the glacier has been designated an Important Bird Area (IBA) by BirdLife International because it supports a breeding colony of about 3,500 emperor penguins, based on 2009 satellite imagery.

== See also ==
- List of glaciers in the Antarctic
- Glaciology

== Maps ==
- Thurston Island – Jones Mountains. 1:500000 Antarctica Sketch Map. US Geological Survey, 1967.
- Antarctic Digital Database (ADD). Scale 1:250000 topographic map of Antarctica. Scientific Committee on Antarctic Research (SCAR), 1993–2016.
