= Noville Peninsula =

Peninsula in Ellsworthland, Antarctica

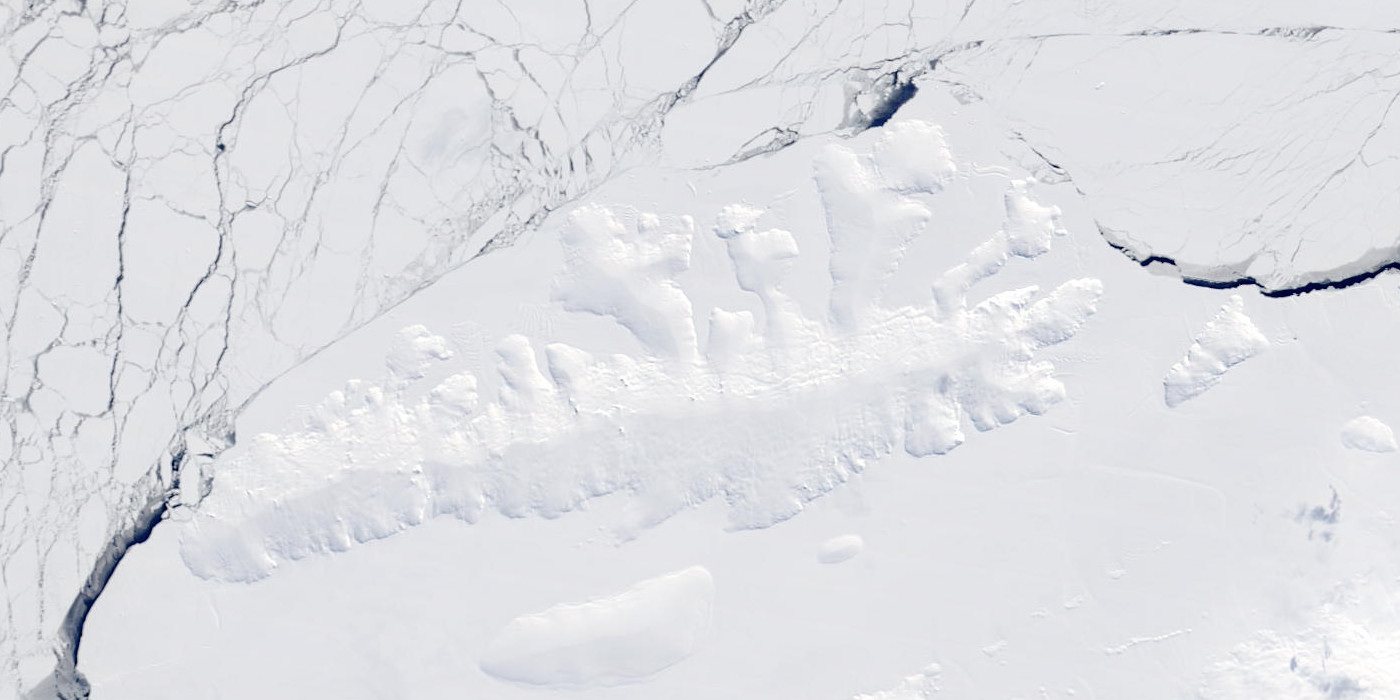
Satellite image of Thurston Island.

Noville Peninsula (71°50′S 98°46′W) is a high ice-covered peninsula about 30 nautical miles (56 km; 35 mi) long, between Peale Inlet and Murphy Inlet on the north side of Thurston Island, Antarctica.

== Location ==
Thurston Island in north of map. Noville Peninsula in center of north shore

The Noville Peninsula extends north from the center of the north shore of Thurston Island. Glacier Bight is to its west, and Porters Pinnacles are just offshore to the north. Peale Inlet defines its west side and Murphy Inlet defines its east side. Mount Hawthorne in the Walker Mountains defines the south end of the peninsula.

== Mapping and name ==
Noville Peninsula was delineated from aerial photographs made by United States Navy Operation Highjump in December 1946. It was named for George Otto Noville, executive officer of the Byrd Antarctic Expedition, 1933–35.

== Features ==
=== Porters Pinnacles ===
71°33′S 99°09′W. A group of low ice-covered rocks forming a menace to navigation along the north coast of Thurston Island, located about 4 nautical miles (7.4 km; 4.6 mi) north of the east extremity of Glacier Bight. Discovered by the United States Navy Bellingshausen Sea Expedition in February 1960, and named for Commander Philip W. Porter, Jr., United States Navy, commander of the icebreaker USS Glacier which made this discovery.

=== Cape LeBlanc ===
71.7333333°S 98.7666667°W. The ice-covered north extremity of Noville Peninsula, which is also the northernmost point of Thurston Island. Named by United States Advisory Committee on Antarctic Names (US-ACAN) after Lieutenant Ralph P. LeBlanc, U.S. Navy Reserve, plane commander of the Operation Highjump PBM Mariner seaplane that crashed 8 nautical miles (15 km; 9.2 mi) south of this cape on 30 December 1946. Severely injured, LeBlanc was among six of nine aboard that survived the crash. The survivors were rescued 12 January 1947 by Lieutenant Commander John D. Howell, who landed a PBM in open water off the northwest edge of Noville Peninsula.

=== Rescue Point ===
71.9°S 99.15°W. An ice-covered point forming the west extremity of Noville Peninsula. So named in remembrance of the Mariner seaplane crash on the peninsula during United States Navy Operation Highjump, and that six survivors were rescued near this point on 12 January 1947 (see also Ball Peninsula, Mount Howell).

=== Mount Palmer ===
71°40′S 98°52′W. An ice-covered mountain, visible from seaward, surmounting the north end of Noville Peninsula on Thurston Island. Delineated from aerial photographs taken by United States Navy in December 1946. Named by US-ACAN for James Troxall Palmer, acting surgeon on the ship Relief and later on the sloop of war Peacock of the USEE under Wilkes, 1838-42, and later Surgeon-General of the Navy.

=== Black Crag ===
71°46′S 98°06′W. A small steep cliff rock exposure at the northeast end of Noville Peninsula. The feature is just south of small Mulroy Island. Delineated from aerial photographs taken by United States Navy Squadron VX-6 in January 1960. Named by US-ACAN for George H. Black, supply officer of the ByrdAE in 1928-30.

=== Mount Feury ===
71°44′S 98°26′W. A mountain between Sikorski Glacier and Frankenfield Glacier on the northeast side of the Noville Peninsula. First delineated from air photos taken by United States Navy Noville Peninsula. Named by US-ACAN for James Feury, mechanic and snowmobile driver of the ByrdAE, 1928-30.

== See also ==
- List of glaciers on Thurston Island

== Sources ==
- Alberts, Fred G., ed. (1995), Geographic Names of the Antarctic (PDF) (2 ed.), United States Board on Geographic Names This article incorporates public domain material from websites or documents of the United States Board on Geographic Names.
- "Cape LeBlanc", Geographic Names Information System, United States Geological Survey, United States Department of the Interior
- "Rescue Point", Geographic Names Information System, United States Geological Survey, United States Department of the Interior
- Thurston Island (PDF), USGS: United States Geological Survey
- This article incorporates public domain material from websites or documents of the United States Geological Survey.
