= America (aircraft) =

Fokker C-2 trimoter monoplane flown on a transatlantic fight in 1927

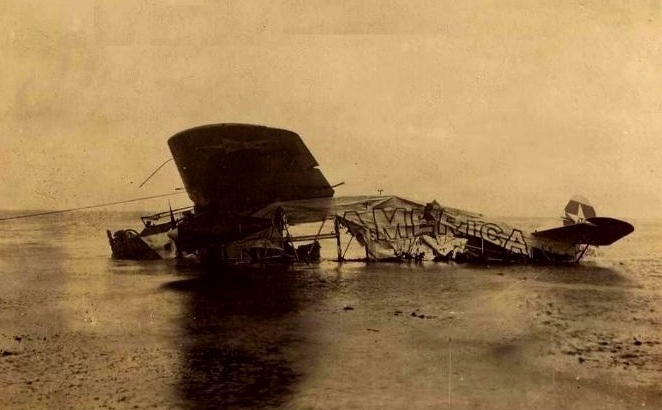
- The America at the end of its transatlantic flight in 1927, near Ver-sur-Mer

General information
- Other name: Fokker F.9
- Type: Fokker C-2
- Registration: NX206
- Flights: 1
- Total distance: 3,800 mi (6,116 km)

History
- Preserved at: machine written off
- Fate: Ditched near Ver-sur-Mer on 1 July 1927

The America was a Fokker C-2 trimotor monoplane that was flown in 1927 by Richard E. Byrd, Bernt Balchen, George Otto Noville, and Bert Acosta on their transatlantic flight.

== History ==
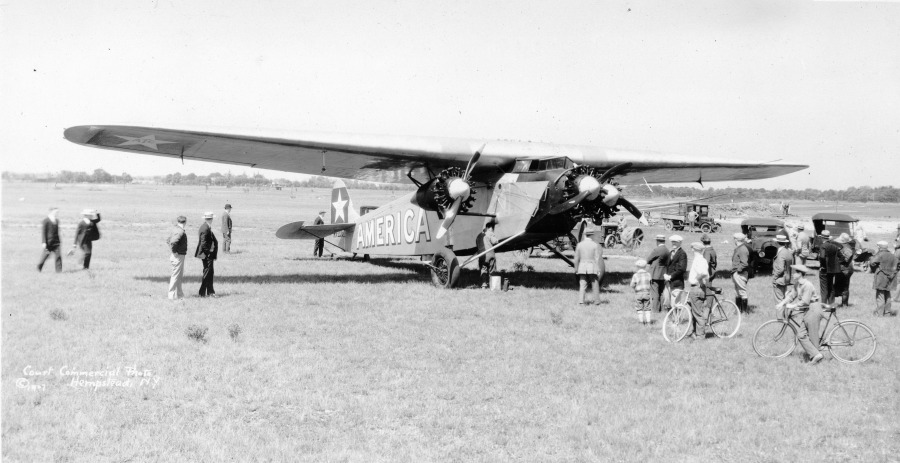
America before its journey across the Atlantic

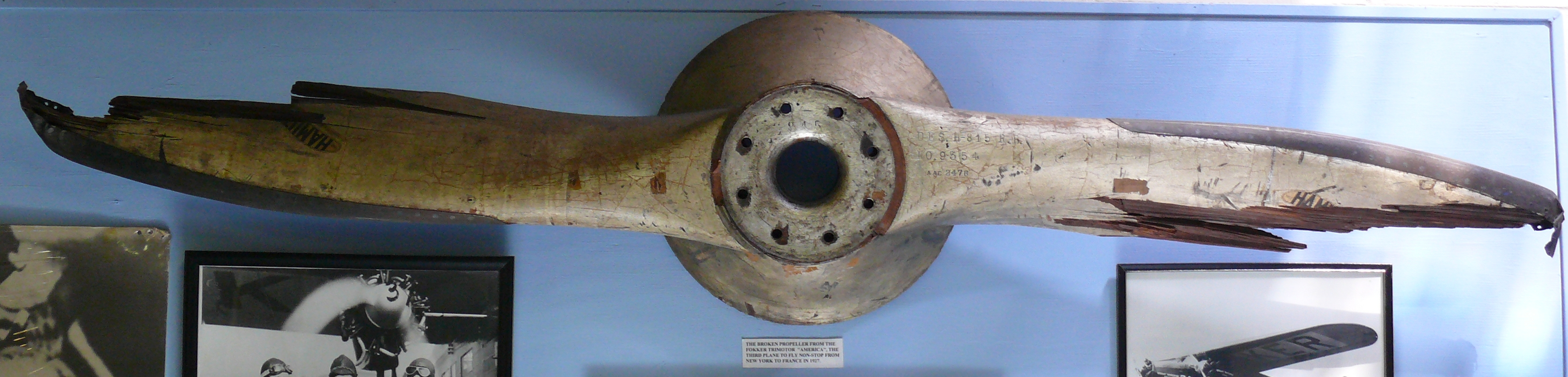
Broken propeller from the America in a museum

For eight years after the first non-stop heavier-than-air Atlantic crossing by a British Vickers Vimy in 1919, there were no further such flights. Then, in 1927, three crossings were made by American flyers, the America's being the third after Lindbergh's first solo crossing in the Spirit of St. Louis flight and Clarence Chamberlin's Columbia flight from New York to Berlin. All three were aspiring to win the Orteig Prize. It was also the first aircraft to carry official airmail across the Atlantic.

The America was destroyed after it was ditched near the French village of Ver-sur-Mer, having flown to Paris but being unable to land due to fog. Distance covered was about 3,800 miles not counting the time and distance spent at Paris waiting in vain for the fog to clear. After it was towed ashore, it was torn apart by souvenir hunters. Portions of the aircraft reside in several museums in Europe and in the United States.

The America is a subject of the America/Goldbeach Museum, located in Ver-sur-Mer.

== See also ==
- Rodman Wanamaker
- American Trans-Oceanic Company
