= Walker Mountains =

Range of peaks and nunataks in Antarctica

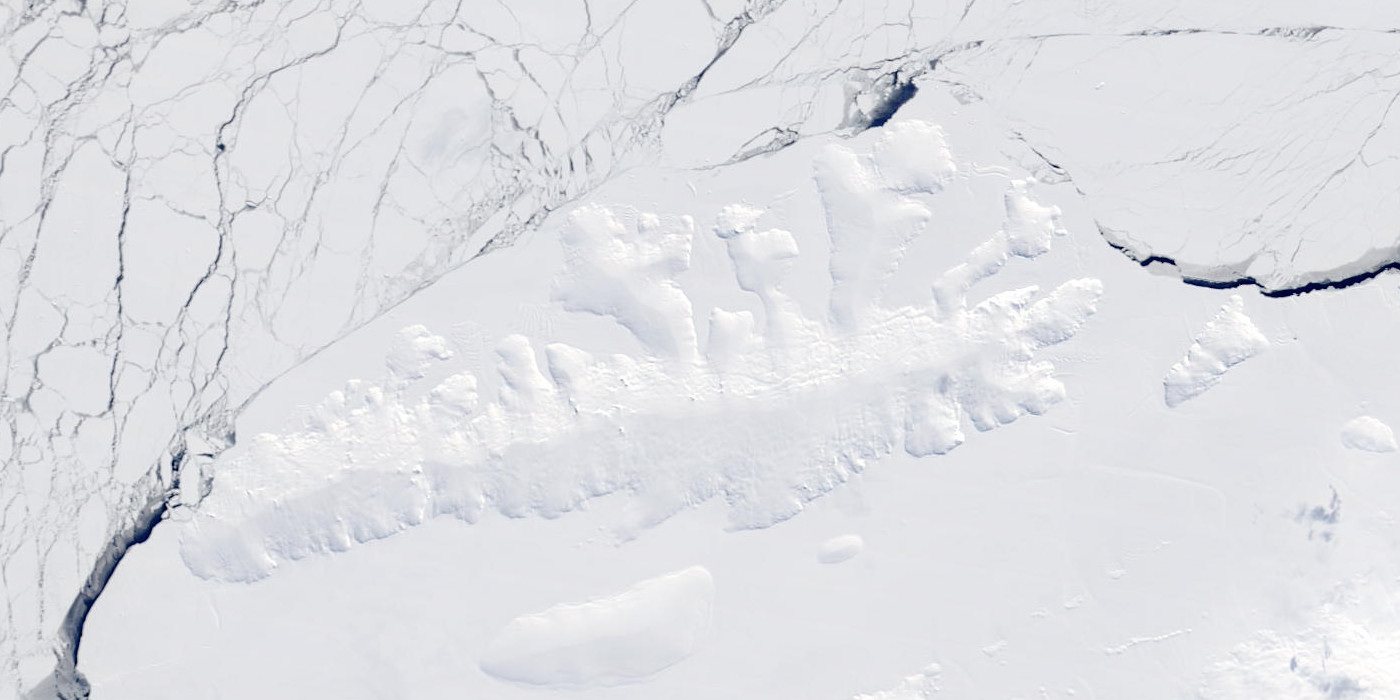
- Satellite image of Thurston Island

Geography
- Location within Antarctica
- Location: Thurston Island, Antarctica
- Range coordinates: 72°07′S 99°0′W

The Walker Mountains (72°07′S 99°0′W) are a range of peaks and nunataks which are fairly well separated but trend east–west to form the axis, or spine, of Thurston Island in Antarctica.

== Location ==
Thurston Island in north of map

The Walker Mountains form the spine of Thurston Island, running from west to east along the length of the island. Features, from west to east, include Landfall Peak, Mount Lopez, Mount Caldwell, Henderson Knob, Mount Kazukaitis, Mount Simpson, Mount Noxon, Mount Leech, Mount Hubbard, Smith Peak, Mount Borgeson, Guy Peaks, Mount Hawthorne, Mount Bramhall, Zuhn Bluff and Parker Peak.

== Discovery and name ==
The Walker Mountains were discovered by Rear Admiral Richard E. Byrd and members of the United States Antarctic Service (USAS) in a flight from the ship Bear on 27 February 1940. They were named by the United States Advisory Committee on Antarctic Names (US-SCAN) for Lt. William M. Walker, captain of the United States Exploring Expedition ship Flying Fish which reached a point 100 mi N of Thurston Island on 23 March 1839.

== Features ==
=== Landfall Peak ===
72°01′S 102°08′W. Prominent peak-shaped landmark near the extreme west end of Thurston Island, about 8 nautical miles (15 km; 9.2 mi) east-northeast of Cape Flying Fish. Discovered by members of the USAS in flights from the ship Bear in February 1940, and photographed at that time by E.B. Perce. The peak was plotted from air photos taken by United States Navy Operation Highjump (OpHjp) in December 1946, and was observed by personnel of the United States Navy Bellingshausen Sea Expedition in February 1960. So named by US-ACAN because rock exposures on the peak serve as a mark for ships approaching Thurston Island from the west.

=== Mount Lopez ===
72°01′S 101°53′W. A peak located 5 nautical miles (9.3 km; 5.8 mi) east of Landfall Peak in the west part of Thurston Island. Delineated from aerial photographs taken by Operation Highjump, 1946-47. Named by US-ACAN for Ens. Maxwell A. Lopez, United States Navy, a member of the expedition who lost his life in a seaplane crash at Thurston Island on 30 December 1946.

=== Mount Caldwell ===
72°04′S 101°46′W. A peak located 3 nautical miles (5.6 km; 3.5 mi) southeast of Mount Lopez. . Delineated from air photos taken by United States Navy Operation Highjump in December 1946. Named by US-ACAN for Captain Henry Howard Caldwell, United States Navy, captain of the seaplane tender Pine Island which explored the area during this expedition. Caldwell and five others survived a 30 December 1946 crash of a seaplane at Thurston Island.

=== Hendersin Knob ===
72°08′S 101°26′W. An ice-covered knob rising between the heads of Craft Glacier and Rochray Glacier in the southwest part of Thurston Island. First plotted from air photos taken by United States Navy Operation Highjump, 1946-47. Named by US-ACAN for aviation radioman Wendell K. Hendersin, United States Navy, a member of the expedition who lost his life in a seaplane crash at Thurston Island on 30 December 1946.

=== Mount Kazukaitis ===
72°01′S 101°09′W. A peak located at the base of Hughes Peninsula in the west part of Thurston Island. Delineated from air photos taken by United States Navy OpHjp in December 1946. Named by US-ACAN for Chief Photographer's Mate Frank Kazukaitis, United States Navy, who recorded features of the Walgreen Coast and Eights Coast on the United States Navy Bellingshausen Sea Expedition in February 1960. He served as photographer on several additional Navy Deep Freeze deployments to Antarctica.

=== Mount Simpson ===
72°06′S 100°45′W. A peak rising just west of the head of Hale Glacier. First mapped from air photos taken by United States Navy OpHjp in December 1946. Named by US-ACAN for Lieutenant B.L. Simpson, Jr., of United States Navy Squadron VX-6, pilot of the P2V Neptune airplane which took additional air photos of the area in January 1960.

=== Mount Noxon ===
72°08′S 100°06′W. A peak rising at the head of Myers Glacier. Delineated from air photos taken by United States Navy OpHjp in December 1946. Named by US-ACAN for Sergeant W.C. Noxon, USMC, who served as navigator on aerial photographic flights over this area by United States Navy Squadron VX-6 in January 1960.

=== Mount Leech ===
72°05′S 99°59′W. A peak standing 5 nautical miles (9.3 km; 5.8 mi) northwest of Mount Hubbard. Delineated from air photos taken by United States Navy OpHjp in December 1946. Named by US-ACAN for Robert E. Leech, entomologist who participated in a USARP airborne insect program in the Ross, Amundsen and Bellingshausen Sea areas in the 1959-60 season.

=== Mount Hubbard ===
72°08′S 99°45′W. A peak standing 6 nautical miles (11 km; 6.9 mi) east of Mount Noxon. First plotted from air photos taken by United States Navy OpHjp in December 1946. Named by US-ACAN for Harold A. Hubbard, USGS geologist aboard the icebreaker Burton Island, who made investigations in the area in February 1960 during the United States Navy Bellingshausen Sea Expedition.

=== Dickens Peak ===
72.1333333°S 99.3166667°W A peak 1.5 nautical miles (2.8 km; 1.7 mi) north-northwest of Smith Peak in north-central Thurston Island. Named by US-ACAN after Aviation Machinist's Mate J.D. Dickens, aircrewman in the Eastern Group of United States Navy (United States Navy) Operation Highjump, which obtained aerial photographs of this peak and adjacent coastal areas, 1946-47.

=== Smith Peak ===
72°05′S 99°28′W. A prominent peak rising southeast of the head of Potaka Inlet and 6 nautical miles (11 km; 6.9 mi) east-northeast of Mount Hubbard. Delineated from air photos taken by United States Navy OpHjp in December 1946. Named by US-ACAN for Dean C. Smith, aviation pilot of the ByrdAE in 1928-30.

=== Litz Bluff ===
72.1833333°S 99.1333333°W An ice-covered bluff 2 nautical miles (3.7 km; 2.3 mi) west of Mount Borgeson. Rock salients mark the face of the bluff. Named by US-ACAN after Ensign M. Eugene Litz, navigator and second pilot of PBM Mariner aircraft in the Eastern Group of United States Navy (United States Navy) Operation Highjump, which obtained aerial photographs of this bluff and coastal areas adjacent to Thurston Island, 1946-47.

=== Mount Borgeson ===
72°07′S 99°10′W. A peak 5 nautical miles (9.3 km; 5.8 mi) east-southeast of Smith Peak. First delineated from air photos taken by United States Navy OpHjp, 1946-47. Named by US-ACAN for Warren T. Borgeson, topographic engineer with the United States Navy Bellingshausen Sea Expedition, who established geodetic control points in this area in February 1960.

=== Lowe Nunataks ===
72.2166667°S 98.9333333°W A cluster of low peaks or nunataks 1.5 nautical miles (2.8 km; 1.7 mi) southeast of Mount Borgeson. Named by US-ACAN after Photographer's Mate W.L. Lowe, aircrewman in the Eastern Group of United States Navy (United States Navy) Operation Highjump, which obtained aerial photographs of this feature and coastal areas adjacent to Thurston Island, 1946-47.

=== Guy Peaks ===
72°04′S 99°04′W. A cluster of peaks located 3 nautical miles (5.6 km; 3.5 mi) northeast of Mount Borgeson, overlooking Peale Inlet. Mapped from air photos made by United States Navy OpHjp in December 1946. Named by US-ACAN for Arthur W. Guy, electrical engineer at Byrd Station, 1964-65.

=== Mount Hawthorne ===
72°10′S 98°39′W. A prominent mountain rising directly south of the base of Noville Peninsula. Discovered by R. Admiral Byrd and members of the USAS in a flight from the Bear on 27 February 1940. Named by Byrd for Roger Hawthorne, field representative for the USAS, 1939-41.

=== Mount Bramhall ===
72°10′S 98°24′W. A peak located 5 nautical miles (9.3 km; 5.8 mi) east of Mount Hawthorne. First delineated from aerial photographs taken by United States Navy OpHjp in December 1946. Named by US-ACAN for Doctor E.H. Bramhall, physicist of the ByrdAE in 1933-35.

=== Zuhn Bluff ===
72°13′S 98°08′W. Steep north-facing bluff standing about 5 nautical miles (9.3 km; 5.8 mi) east-southeast of Mount Bramhall. Delineated from air photos taken by United States Navy OpHjp in December 1946. Named by US-ACAN for Arthur A. Zuhn, physicist with the ByrdAE in 1933-35.

=== Parker Peak ===
72°14′S 97°30′W. A peak rising at the base of Evans Peninsula. Delineated from air photos taken by United States Navy Squadron VX-6 in January 1960. Named by US-ACAN for Alton N. Parker, aviation pilot of the ByrdAE in 1928-30.

== See also ==
- List of glaciers on Thurston Island

== Sources ==
- Alberts, Fred G., ed. (1995), Geographic Names of the Antarctic (PDF) (2 ed.), United States Board on Geographic Names This article incorporates public domain material from websites or documents of the United States Board on Geographic Names.
- "Dickens Peak", Geographic Names Information System, United States Geological Survey, United States Department of the Interior
- "Litz Bluff", Geographic Names Information System, United States Geological Survey, United States Department of the Interior
- "Lowe Nunataks", Geographic Names Information System, United States Geological Survey, United States Department of the Interior
- Thurston Island (PDF), USGS: United States Geological Survey
- This article incorporates public domain material from websites or documents of the United States Geological Survey.
