= Thurston Island =

Island in Ellsworth Land, Antarctica

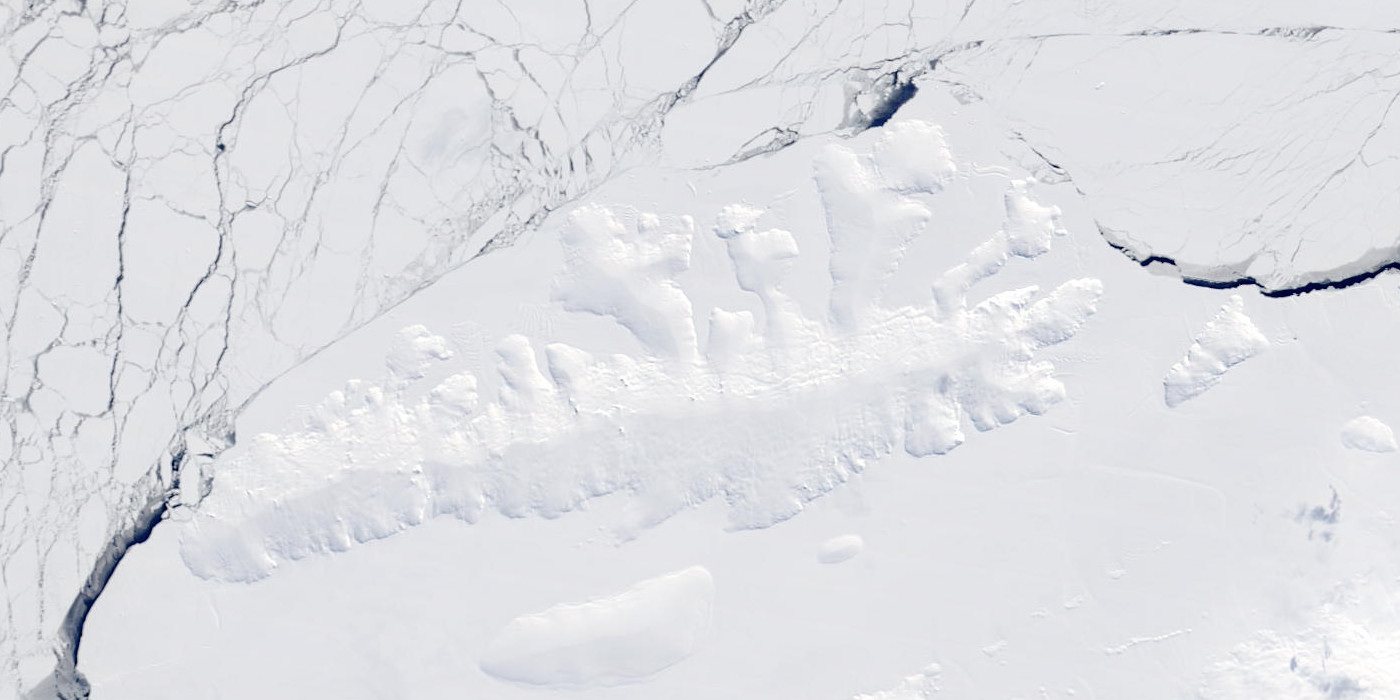
- Satellite image of the island (northeast-up oriented)

- Map of Thurston Island

- Location of Thurston Island

Geography
- Location: Antarctica
- Coordinates: 72°6′S 99°0′W
- Area: 15,700 km^{2} (6,100 sq mi)
- Area rank: 56th
- Length: 215 km (133.6 mi)
- Width: 90 km (56 mi)
- Highest elevation: 750 m (2460 ft)
- Highest point: Mount Howell

Administration
- Administered under the Antarctic Treaty System

Thurston Island (72°6′S 99°0′W) is a largely ice-covered, glacially dissected island, 135 nautical miles (250 km; 155 mi) long and 55 nautical miles (102 km; 63 mi) wide, lying between Amundsen Sea and Bellingshausen Sea a short way off the northwest end of Ellsworth Land, Antarctica. The island is separated from the mainland by Peacock Sound, which is occupied by the west portion of Abbot Ice Shelf.

== Geography ==
Thurston Island in north of map

Thurston Island is separated from the mainland by Peacock Sound, which is occupied by the western portion of Abbot Ice Shelf. It lies off the Eights Coast. Bellingshausen Sea lies the east and Amundsen Sea to the west. Sherman Island, Carpenter Island and Dustin Island in Seraph Bay lie to the south of Thurston Island. The Walker Mountains form the spine of the island. Peaks in that range include, from west to east, Landfall Peak, Mount Lopez, Mount Caldwell, Mount Kazukaitis, Mount Simpson, Mount Noxon, Mount Leech, Mount Hubbard, Smith Peak, Mount Borgesen, Guy Peaks, Mount Hawthorne, Mount Bramhall, Zuhn Bluff and Parker Peak.

The northwest side of the island consists of a series of capes, peninsulas and inlets. From west to east they include Cape Flying Fish, Cape Petersen, Williams Island, Jones Peninsula, Dyer Point, Cape Davies, Hughes Peninsula, Henry Inlet, Tinglof Peninsula, Wagoner Inlet, Starr Peninsula, Potaka Inlet, Kearns Peninsula, Peale Inlet, Glacier Bight, Noville Peninsula, Porters Pinnacles and Mount Palmer. Features of the north of the island include Sikorski Glacier, Mount Feury, Frankenfield Glacier, Mulroy Island, Black Crag, Pelter Glacier, Murphy Inlet, Linsley Peninsula, Ball Peninsula, Edwards Peninsula, Mount Bubier, Koether Inlet, Evans Peninsula, Cape Walden and Cape Braathen.

Features of the east coast include from north to south Cadwalader Inlet, Deadmond Glacier, Lofgren Peninsula, Cape Menzel, Barret Island, Morgan Inlet, Tierney Peninsula and Cape Annawan. Features of the southwest coast include, from west to east, Kannheiser Glacier, Craft Glacier, Hendersin Knob, Rochray Glacier, Cox Glacier, Hale Glacier, Myers Glacier, Sherman Island, Schwartz Cove, Williamson Peninsula, Trice Islands, O'Dowd Cove and Evans Point. Features of the southeast coast include, from west to east, Von der Wall Point, Boker Rocks, Mount Dowling, Belknap Nunatak, Prickly Ridge, Shelton Head, Long Glacier, Simpson Bluff, Baker Knob, Harrison Nunatak, Cape Walker and Savage Glacier.

== History ==
Thurston Island was discovered by Rear Admiral Richard E. Byrd and members of the United States Antarctic Service (USAS) in a flight from the Bear on 27 February 1940. Byrd named it for W. Harris Thurston, a New York textile manufacturer, designer of the windproof "Byrd Cloth" and contributor to the expedition. Originally charted as a peninsula, the feature was found to be an island by the USN Bellingshausen Sea Expedition in February 1960.

On 30 December 1946, Thurston Island was the site of Antarctica's first fatal plane crash. A Martin PBM-5 Mariner (59098) of the US Navy with the Byrd expedition hit a ridge and burned on the island, killing 3 of the 9 occupants. The 6 survivors were rescued 13 days later.

== Northwest features ==
=== Cape Flying Fish ===
72°06′S 102°29′W. An ice-covered cape which forms the west extremity of Thurston Island. Discovered by R. Admiral Byrd and members of the United States Antarctic Service (USAS) in a flight from the Bear, February 1940. Named by US-SCAN for the USEE ship Flying Fish, commanded by Lieutenant William M. Walker, United States Navy, which reached a point within 125 nautical miles (232 km; 144 mi) of this cape; the ship's position on the morning of 23 March 1839 was 70|00|S|100|16|W

=== Cape Petersen ===
71°56′S 101°46′W. A rounded ice-covered cape on the north side of Thurston Island, about 18 nautical miles (33 km; 21 mi) east-northeast of Cape Flying Fish. Delineated from air photos taken by United States Navy Operation Highjump in December 1946. Named by the United States Advisory Committee on Antarctic Names (US-ACAN) for Carl O. Petersen, radio engineer with the ByrdAE in 1928–30 and 1933–35.

=== Williams Island ===
71°54′S 101°26′W. Ice-covered island about 1 nautical mile (1.9 km; 1.2 mi) long, lying midway between Cape Petersen and Dyer Point and about 2 nautical miles (3.7 km; 2.3 mi) off the north coast of Thurston Island. Delineated from air photos taken by United States Navy Squadron VX-6 in January 1960. Named by US-ACAN for Frederick W. Williams, aviation machinist's mate with United States Navy Operation Highjump, who lost his life in a seaplane crash at Thurston Island on 30 December 1946.

=== Jones Peninsula ===
71.9166667°S 100.8333333°W An ice-covered peninsula 5 nautical miles (9.3 km; 5.8 mi) west of Hughes Peninsula in northwest Thurston Island. Named by Advisory Committee on Antarctic Names (US-ACAN) after Ensign Robert H. Jones, navigator and second pilot of PBM Mariner aircraft in the Eastern Group of United States Navy Operation Highjump, which obtained aerial photographs of this peninsula and coastal areas adjacent to Thurston Island, 1946–47.

=== Dyer Point ===
71°52′S 100°55′W. Ice-covered point just west of Hughes Peninsula on the north coast of Thurston Island. First plotted from air photos taken by United States Navy Operation Highjump in December 1946. Named by US-ACAN for J.N. Dyer, radio engineer with the ByrdAE in 1933–35.

=== Cape Davies ===
71°46′S 100°23′W. Ice-covered cape at the northeast end of Hughes Peninsula. First delineated from air photos taken by United States Navy Operation Highjump in December 1946. Named by US-ACAN for Frank Davies, physicist with the ByrdAE in 1928–30.

=== Hughes Peninsula ===
71°52′S 100°35′W. Ice-covered peninsula about 18 nautical miles (33 km; 21 mi) long, lying west of Henry Inlet. Plotted from air photos taken by United States Navy Operation Highjump in December 1946. Named by US-ACAN for Jerry Hughes, photographer's mate with the United States Navy Bellingshausen Sea Expedition in February 1960, who took aerial photographs of Thurston Island from helicopters.

=== Henry Inlet ===
71°54′S 100°20′W. Narrow, ice-filled inlet about 12 nautical miles (22 km; 14 mi) long, indenting the north coast of Thurston Island immediately east of Hughes Peninsula. First plotted from air photos taken by United States Navy Operation Highjump, 1946–47. Named by US-ACAN for Robert Henry, photographer's mate with the United States Navy Bellingshausen Sea Expedition, who in February 1960 recorded features along Eights Coast from helicopters.

=== Tinglof Peninsula ===
71°59′S 100°24′W. An ice-covered peninsula, 10 nautical miles (19 km; 12 mi) long, between Henry and Wagoner Inlets on the north side of Thurston Island. Delineated from aerial photographs taken by United States Navy Operation Highjump in December 1946. Named by US-ACAN for Ivor Tinglof, tractor mechanic of the ByrdAE in 1933–35, who built at Little America the first heavy cargo sleds for use in the Antarctic.

=== Smith Cliff ===
71.9833333°S 100.1333333°W. A rock cliff midway along the ice-covered northern shore of Tinglof Peninsula. Named by Advisory Committee on Antarctic Names (US-ACAN) after Aviation Radioman William F. Smith, aircrewman in the Eastern Group of U.S. Navy (USN) Operation Highjump, which obtained aerial photographs of this cliff and coastal areas adjacent to Thurston Island, 1946–47.

=== Wagoner Inlet ===
71°57′S 100°02′W. An ice-filled inlet between Tinglof and Starr Peninsulas on the north side of Thurston Island. Delineated from aerial photos taken by United States Navy Operation Highjump in December 1946. Named by US-ACAN for Charles Wagoner, seaman on the USS Glacier during the United States Navy Bellingshausen Sea Expedition, a member of the field party engaged in scientific work on Thurston Island in February 1960.

=== Starr Peninsula ===
71°56′S 99°46′W. An ice-covered peninsula about 10 nautical miles (19 km; 12 mi) long, between Wagoner and Potaka Inlets on the north side of Thurston Island. Delineated from aerial photographs taken by United States Navy Operation Highjump in December 1946. Named by US-ACAN for Robert B. Starr, oceanographer aboard the USS Glacier in this area during the United States Navy Bellingshausen Sea Expedition in February 1960.

=== Potaka Inlet ===
71°57′S 99°35′W. Narrow ice-filled inlet about 8 nautical miles (15 km; 9.2 mi) long, indenting the north side of Thurston Island immediately east of Starr Peninsula. First delineated from air photos taken by United States Navy Operation Highjump in December 1946. Named by US-ACAN for Doctor Louis H. Potaka, medical officer with the ByrdAE, 1933–35.

=== Kearns Peninsula ===
72.05°S 99.2166667°W. A broad ice-covered peninsula between Potaka Inlet and Peale Inlet on the north side of Thurston Island. Named by Advisory Committee on Antarctic Names (US-ACAN) after Lieutenant (jg) William H. Kearns, United States Navy Reserve (United States Navy Reserve), co-pilot of the Operation Highjump PBM Mariner seaplane that crashed on adjacent Noville Peninsula, 30 December 1946. Kearns and five other survivors were rescued on 12 January 1947.

=== Peale Inlet ===
71°55′S 99°12′W. Ice-filled inlet about 16 nautical miles (30 km; 18 mi) long, lying immediately west of Neville Peninsula and indenting the north side of Thurston Island. Delineated from aerial photographs taken by United States Navy Operation Highjump in December 1946. Named by US-ACAN for Titian Ramsay Peale, noted artist−naturalist who served on the sloop of war Peacock of the USEE under Wilkes, 1838-42. The Peacock, accompanied by the tender Flying Fish, sailed along the edge of the pack ice to the north of Thurston Island for several days in March 1839.

=== Glacier Bight ===
71°48′S 99°45′W. An open embayment about 22 nautical miles (41 km; 25 mi) wide, indenting the north coast of Thurston Island between Hughes and Noville Peninsulas. First delineated from air photos taken by United States Navy Operation Highjump in December 1946. Named by US-ACAN for the icebreaker USS Glacier the first ship ever to make its way to this coastal area, in February 1960.

=== Noville Peninsula ===
71°50′S 98°46′W. High ice-covered peninsula about 30 nautical miles (56 km; 35 mi) long, between Peale and Murphy Inlets on the north side of Thurston Island. Delineated from aerial photographs made by United States Navy Operation Highjump in December 1946. Named for George O. Noville, executive officer of ByrdAE, 1933–35.

== Northeast features ==
=== Mulroy Island ===
71°45′S 98°06′W. Small island which lies just off Black Crag, the east extremity of Noville Peninsula. Discovered by the United States Navy Bellingshausen Sea Expedition in February 1960. Named by US-ACAN for Thomas B. Mulroy, fuel engineer with ByrdAE in 1928–30.

=== Murphy Inlet ===
71°56′S 98°03′W. Ice-filled inlet about 18 nautical miles (33 km; 21 mi) long, with two parallel branches at the head, lying between Noville and Edwards Peninsulas. Delineated from aerial photographs taken by United States Navy OpHjp in December 1946. Named by US-ACAN for Charles J.V. Murphy, assistant to R. Admiral Byrd after ByrdAE of 1928–30, and member of the wintering party of ByrdAE of 1933–35.

=== Linsley Peninsula ===
72°03′S 98°11′W. A broad, roughly rectangular ice-covered peninsula which protrudes into the south part of Murphy Inlet, dividing the inlet into two arms at the head. The peninsula was first plotted from air photos taken by United States Navy OpHjp, 1946–47. Named by US-ACAN for Lieutenant Commander Richard G. Linsley, United States Navy, pilot of LC-130 Hercules aircraft who made flights in support of the USARP geological party working at Thurston Island in the 1968–69 season.

=== Ball Peninsula ===
72.1333333°S 98.05°W. A broad ice-covered peninsula. It extends into Murphy Inlet between Noville Peninsula and Edwards Peninsula. Named by Advisory Committee on Antarctic Names (US-ACAN) after Lieutenant (jg) James L. Ball, PBM Mariner pilot in the Eastern Group of United States Navy (United States Navy) Operation Highjump, which obtained aerial photographs of this peninsula and adjacent coastal areas, 1946–47. Ball commanded the 11 January 1947 search plane which, after 12 days of uncertainty, found the burned wreck and survivors of the Mariner crash on Noville Peninsula.

=== Edwards Peninsula ===
71°55′S 97°46′W. Ice-covered peninsula about 20 nautical miles (37 km; 23 mi) long, between Murphy and Koether Inlets. Delineated from aerial photographs made by United States Navy OpHjp in December 1946 and by United States Navy Squadron VX-6 in January 1960. Named by US-ACAN for Lieutenant Donald L. Edwards, navigator of USS Burton Island on the United States Navy Bellingshausen Sea Expedition to this area in February 1960.

=== Mount Bubier ===
71°51′S 97°48′W. Mountain visible from seaward, its summit about 4 nautical miles (7.4 km; 4.6 mi) south of the north tip of Edwards Peninsula. First delineated from air photos taken by United States Navy OpHjp in December 1946. Named by US-ACAN for Kennard F. Bubier, aviation mechanic on ByrdAE in 1928–30.

=== Koether Inlet ===
71°56′S 97°20′W. Ice-filled inlet about 18 nautical miles (33 km; 21 mi) long, indenting the coast between Edwards Peninsula and Evans Peninsula. Delineated from air photos taken by United States Navy Squadron VX-6 in January 1960. Named by US-ACAN for Ens. Bernard Koether, navigator of USS Glacier on the United States Navy Bellingshausen Sea Expedition, who in February 1960 assisted in the charting of the Thurston Island coastline and in the accurate location of soundings.

=== Evans Peninsula ===
71°58′S 96°42′W. Ice-covered peninsula about 30 nautical miles (56 km; 35 mi) long, between Koether Inlet and Cadwalader Inlet. Discovered in flights from the USS Burton Island and Glacier by personnel of the United States Navy Bellingshausen Sea Expedition in February 1960. Named by US-ACAN for Commander Griffith Evans, Jr., commander of the icebreaker Burton Island during this expedition.

=== Cape Walden ===
71°44′S 96°55′W. Ice-covered cape at the northwest termination of Evans Peninsula, marking the east entrance of Koether Inlet. Delineated from air photos taken by United States Navy Squadron VX-6 in January 1960. Named by US-ACAN for Arthur T. Walden, dog driver and leader of the Queen Maud Mountains Supporting Party of the ByrdAE in 1928–30.

=== Cape Braathen ===
71°48′S 96°05′W. Ice-covered cape at the northwest termination of Evans Peninsula. Delineated from aerial photographs taken by United States Navy Squadron VX-6 in January 1960. Named by US-ACAN for Christoffer Braathen, ski expert and dog driver with the ByrdAE of 1928–30.

== Eastern features ==
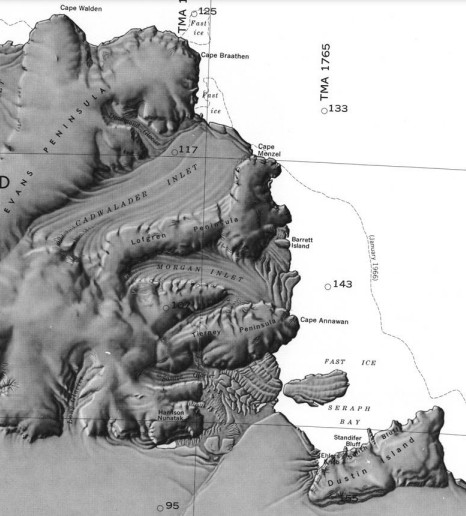
East of Thurston Island

=== Cadwalader Inlet ===
72°04′S 96°18′W. Ice-filled inlet about 22 nautical miles (41 km; 25 mi) long, indenting the northeast coast of Thurston Island between Evans and Lofgren Peninsulas. Discovered on helicopter flights from the USS Burton Island and Glacier by personnel of United States Navy Bellingshausen Sea Expedition in February 1960. Named by US-ACAN for Captain John Cadwalader, United States Navy, chief of staff to United States Antarctic Projects Officer and representative of Task Unit Commander aboard the Burton Island in February 1960.

=== Lofgren Peninsula ===
72°08′S 96°00′W. An ice-covered peninsula about 22 nautical miles (41 km; 25 mi) long, projecting between Cadwalader and Morgan Inlets on the northeast side of Thurston Island. Discovered in helicopter flights from the USS Glacier and Burton Island by personnel of the United States Navy Bellingshausen Sea Expedition in February 1960. Named by US-ACAN for Charles E. Lofgren, personnel officer with the ByrdAE, 1928–30.

=== Morgan Inlet ===
72°12′S 96°00′W. Ice-filled inlet about 18 nautical miles (33 km; 21 mi) long, with two branches, indenting the east end of Thurston Island between Lofgren and Tierney Peninsulas. Discovered in helicopter flights from USS Glacier and Burton Island by personnel of the United States Navy Bellingshausen Sea Expedition in February 1960. Named by US-ACAN for Lieutenant Commander Joseph R. Morgan, United States Navy, hydrographic and oceanographic officer of United States Navy Task Force 43 during this expedition.

=== Ryan Point ===
72.3°S 95.85°W. A bold coastal point in ice-filled Morgan Inlet at the east end of Thurston Island. The point forms the east extremity of the wedge-shaped promontory between Lofgren Peninsula and Tierney Peninsula. Named by US-ACAN after A.E. Ryan, Chief Photographer's Mate in the Eastern Group of U.S. Navy (USN) Operation Highjump, which obtained aerial photographs of Thurston Island and adjacent coastal areas, 1946–47.

=== King Cliffs ===
72°14′S 96°10′W. Ice-covered cliffs, with numerous rock exposures, forming the south side of the larger north arm of Morgan Inlet, on Thurston Island. The cliffs were first investigated by geologists with the United States Navy Bellingshausen Sea Expedition in February 1960. Named by US-ACAN for Charles E. King, geologist, member of the Ellsworth Land Survey which worked at the cliffs in the 1968–69 season.

=== Tierney Peninsula ===
72°20′S 95°45′W. An ice-covered peninsula about 14 nautical miles (26 km; 16 mi) long, between Savage Glacier and Morgan Inlet in.the east end of Thurston Island. Discovered on helicopter flights from the USS Burton Island and Glacier of the United States Navy Bellingshausen Sea Expedition in February 1960. Named by US-ACAN for J.Q. Tierney, oceanographer aboard the Burton Island on this expedition.

=== Cape Annawan ===
72°18′S 95°24′W. An ice-covered cape which marks the east extremity of Thurston Island and the northwest entrance to Seraph Bay. Discovered in helicopter flights from the USS Burton Island and Glacier by personnel of the United States Navy Bellingshausen Sea Expedition in February 1960. Named by US-ACAN for the ship Annawan, of the United States Expedition of 1829-31, which with the Penguin sailed west from the South Shetland Islands in February 1830, holding a course between 62°S and 58°S and exploring as far as 103°W, northward of this cape.

=== Pallid Crest ===
72.3833333°S 96.2166667°W. A solitary ice-covered ridge 2 nautical miles (3.7 km; 2.3 mi) west of the base of Tierney Peninsula. The feature is visible from a considerable distance and various directions. So named by US-ACAN because of its whitish appearance.

== Southwestern features ==
=== Jordan Nunatak ===
72°09′S 101°16′W. A nunatak standing between the heads of Rochray Glacier and Cox Glacier in the southwest part of Thurston Island. Mapped by USGS from ground surveys and United States Navy air photos, 1960-66. Named by US-ACAN for Specialist 6 Joe Jordan, United States Army Aviation Detachment, a helicopter mechanic on the Ellsworth Land Survey, 1968–69 season.

=== Gould Knoll ===
72.2333333°S 100.5833333°W. A mostly ice-covered rock knoll that rises on the east margin of Hale Glacier at the point the glacier enters Abbot Ice Shelf. Named by US-ACAN after William G. Gould, NOAA specialist, 1960s to the mid 1990s, in the archiving of Advanced Very High Resolution Radiometer satellite images of the world, including those used for AVHRR image maps of the Antarctic continent.

=== Schwartz Cove ===
72.4°S 99.4666667°W. An ice-filled cove of Abbot Ice Shelf located west of Williamson Peninsula on the south side of Thurston Island. Trice Islands lie at the cove entrance. Named by Advisory Committee on Antarctic Names (US-ACAN) after Commander Isidor J. Schwartz, Executive Officer of the seaplane tender USS Pine Island in the Eastern Group of United States Navy (United States Navy) Operation Highjump, 1946–47.

=== Williamson Peninsula ===
72.45°S 99.3°W. An ice-covered peninsula midway along the south side of Thurston Island. It extends southwest into Abbot Ice Shelf between Schwartz Cove and O'Dowd Cove. Named by Advisory Committee on Antarctic Names (US-ACAN) after Lieutenant Commander H. E. Williamson, Medical Officer of the seaplane tender Pine Island in the Eastern Group of United States Navy (United States Navy) Operation Highjump, 1946–47.

=== O'Dowd Cove ===
72.5°S 98.9166667°W. An ice-filled cove of Abbot Ice Shelf between Williamson Peninsula and Von der Wall Point on the south side of Thurston Island. Named by Advisory Committee on Antarctic Names (US-ACAN) after Commander William O'Dowd, Aviation Officer of the seaplane tender USS Pine Island in the Eastern Group of United States Navy (United States Navy) Operation Highjump, 1946–47.

=== Evans Point ===
72°26′S 99°39′W. An ice-covered point fronting on Peacock Sound, lying 15 nautical miles (28 km; 17 mi) west-northwest of Von der Wall Point. First plotted from air photos taken by United States Navy OpHjp in December 1946. Named by US-ACAN for Richard Evans, an oceanographer on the USS Burton Island in this area during the United States Navy Bellingshausen Sea Expedition, February 1960.

== Southeastern features ==
=== Von der Wall Point ===
72°29′S 98°50′W. A low ice-covered point on the south side of Thurston Island. It extends into Peacock Sound toward the northeast extremity of Sherman Island. Delineated from aerial photos taken by United States Navy OpHjp in December 1946. Named by US-ACAN for J.H. Von der Wall, tractor driver and mechanic with the ByrdAE in 1933–35.

=== Boker Rocks ===
72°25′S 98°40′W. A rocky exposure located 5 nautical miles (9.3 km; 5.8 mi) northeast of Von der Wall Point. Mapped by USGS from surveys and United States Navy air photos, 1960-66. Named by US-ACAN for Helmut C. Boker, meteorologist at Byrd Station, 1964-65.

=== Mount Dowling ===
72°27′S 98°08′W. Small mountain overlooking the south coast of Thurston Island, about 13 nautical miles (24 km; 15 mi) east of Von der Wall Point. Mapped by USGS from surveys and USN air photos, 1960-66. Named by US-ACAN for Forrest L. Dowling, geophysicist at Byrd Station, 1960-61.

=== Belknap Nunatak ===
72°26′S 97°45′W. A nunatak about 6 nautical miles (11 km; 6.9 mi) west-northwest of Shelton Head, surmounting an ice-covered spur on the south coast of Thurston Island. Mapped by USGS from surveys and United States Navy air photos, 1960-66. Named by US-ACAN for William Belknap, field assistant at Byrd Station, 1964-65.

=== Prickly Ridge ===
72.5166667°S 97.5666667°W. A rounded ice-covered ridge 4 nautical miles (7.4 km; 4.6 mi) west of Shelton Head on the south side of Thurston Island. Belknap Nunatak is the largest outcrop on the ridge. The descriptive name was given by Advisory Committee on Antarctic Names (US-ACAN); small dispersed nunataks rise above the ice surface giving the feature a prickly appearance.

=== Shelton Head ===
72°28′S 97°25′W. A headland marked by exposed rock, located 12 nautical miles (22 km; 14 mi) west of Long Glacier on the south coast of Thurston Island. Mapped by USGS from surveys and United States Navy air photos, 1960-66. Named by US-ACAN for John A. Shelton meteorologist at Byrd Station, 1963-64.

=== Long Bluff ===
72.5333333°S 96.7666667°W. A conspicuous rock bluff on the west side of Long Glacier in southeast Thurston Island. Named by US-ACAN after W.A. Long, Chief Pharmacist's Mate in the Eastern Group of U.S. Navy (USN) Operation Highjump, 1946–47. Assigned to the 11 January 1947 search flight commanded by Lieutenant (jg) James L. Ball, Long was first to sight the wreck of PBM Mariner seaplane George One on Noville Peninsula, leading to the rescue of its survivors.

=== Simpson Bluff ===
72.45°S 96.1°W. A broad ice-covered bluff at the east end of Thurston Island. The bluff stands between Levko Glacier and Savage Glacier where they enter Seraph Bay. Named by Advisory Committee on Antarctic Names (US-ACAN) after Photographer's Mate R.M. Simpson, aircrewman in the Eastern Group of United States Navy (United States Navy) Operation Highjump, which obtained aerial photographs of Thurston Island and adjacent coastal areas, 1946–47.

=== Baker Knob ===
72.5°S 96.0166667°W. A small rounded coastal elevation which has an abrupt east face, standing 2 nautical miles (3.7 km; 2.3 mi) north of Harrison Nunatak at the east end of Thurston Island. Named by Advisory Committee on Antarctic Names (US-ACAN) after T.W. Baker, Photographer's Mate in the Eastern Group of United States Navy (United States Navy) Operation Highjump, which obtained aerial photographs of Thurston Island and adjacent coastal areas, 1946–47.

=== Harrison Nunatak ===
72°29′S 96°05′W. A snow-covered nunatak, with rock exposure to the SE, located 4 nautical miles (7.4 km; 4.6 mi) south of Savage Glacier in the extreme southeast part of Thurston Island. Discovered on helicopter flights from the USS Burton Island and Glacier during the United States Navy Bellinghausen Sea Expedition in February 1960. Named by US-ACAN for Henry T. Harrison, Jr., United States Weather Bureau meteorologist with the ByrdAE in 1928–30.

=== Cape Walker ===
72.55°S 95.95°W. An ice-covered cape which forms the southeast end of Thurston Island. Named by Advisory Committee on Antarctic Names (US-ACAN) after Captain Edward K. Walker, captain of the Canisteo, a tanker in the Eastern Group of United States Navy (United States Navy) Operation Highjump, 1946–47.

== See also ==
- List of glaciers on Thurston Island

== Sources ==
- Alberts, Fred G., ed. (1995), Geographic Names of the Antarctic (PDF) (2 ed.), United States Board on Geographic Names This article incorporates public domain material from websites or documents of the United States Board on Geographic Names.
- "ASN Aircraft accident Martin PBM-5 Mariner 59098 Thurston Island", aviation-safety.net
- "Ball Peninsula", Geographic Names Information System, United States Geological Survey, United States Department of the Interior
- "Baker Knob", Geographic Names Information System, United States Geological Survey, United States Department of the Interior
- "Cape Walker", Geographic Names Information System, United States Geological Survey, United States Department of the Interior
- "Gould Knoll", Geographic Names Information System, United States Geological Survey, United States Department of the Interior
- "Jones Peninsula", Geographic Names Information System, United States Geological Survey, United States Department of the Interior
- "Kearns Peninsula", Geographic Names Information System, United States Geological Survey, United States Department of the Interior
- "Long Bluff", Geographic Names Information System, United States Geological Survey, United States Department of the Interior
- "O'Dowd Cove", Geographic Names Information System, United States Geological Survey, United States Department of the Interior
- "Pallid Crest", Geographic Names Information System, United States Geological Survey, United States Department of the Interior
- "Prickly Ridge", Geographic Names Information System, United States Geological Survey, United States Department of the Interior
- "Ryan Point", Geographic Names Information System, United States Geological Survey, United States Department of the Interior
- "Schwartz Cove", Geographic Names Information System, United States Geological Survey, United States Department of the Interior
- "Simpson Bluff", Geographic Names Information System, United States Geological Survey, United States Department of the Interior
- "Smith Cliff", Geographic Names Information System, United States Geological Survey, United States Department of the Interior
- Thurston Island (PDF), USGS: United States Geological Survey
- "Williamson Peninsula", Geographic Names Information System, United States Geological Survey, United States Department of the Interior
- This article incorporates public domain material from websites or documents of the United States Geological Survey.
