= Jonna =

Jonna may refer to:

- Jonna Adlerteg (born 1995), Swedish gymnast
- Jonna Andersson (born 1993), Swedish football defender
- Jonna Fitzgerald, American beauty pageant titleholder and musical entertainer
- Jonna Doolittle Hoppes, American author whose works include oral histories and biographies
- Jonna Dwinger, Danish journalist and food critic
- Jonna Lee (actress) (born 1963), American television and film actress
- Jonna Lee (singer) (born 1981), Swedish singer, songwriter, record producer and visual director
- Jonna Liljendahl (born 1970), Swedish former child actress, played Madicken (by Astrid Lindgren)
- Jonna Mannion (born 1988), American reality TV personality
- Jonna Mazet (born 1967), American epidemiologist, Executive Director of the University of California, Davis One Health Institute
- Jonna Mendes (born 1979), former World Cup alpine ski racer from the United States
- Jonna Mendez (born 1945), the former Chief of Disguise in the CIA’s Office of Technical Service
- Lena Maria Jonna Olin (born 1955), Swedish actress
- Jonna Pirinen (born 1982), pop and R&B singer/songwriter from Finland
- Jonna Tervomaa (born 1973), Finnish pop singer and songwriter
- Jonna Tilgner (born 1984), German sprinter and hurdler who specialized in the 400 metres
- Jonna de Vries (born 1990), Dutch rower

== See also ==
- Joanna
- Joannas
- Jona (disambiguation)
- Jonn
