= Dwinger =

Dwinger may refer to:

- Edwin Erich Dwinger (1898-1981), Russian-German novelist and SS-Obersturmführer; Wilhelm Wien's son-in-law
- Ida Dwinger, Danish actress
- Jonna Dwinger, Danish journalist and food critic
- Max Dwinger (fencer born 1870) (1870-1939), Dutch fencer
- Max Dwinger (fencer born 1943), Dutch fencer, grandson of the above
