= Jimmy Doolittle =

American general and aviator (1896–1993)

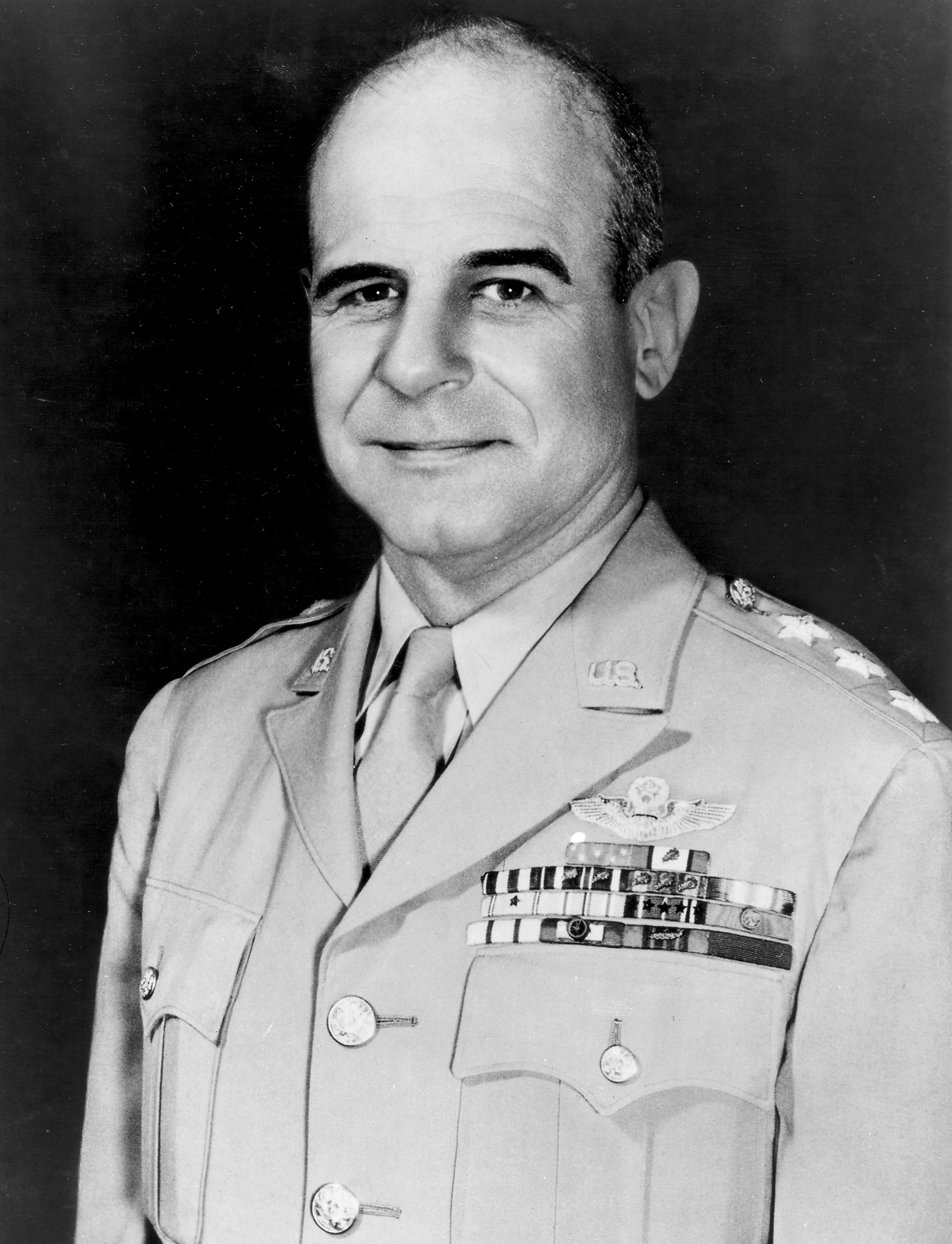
- Born: December 14, 1896; Alameda, California, U.S.
- Died: September 27, 1993 (aged 96); Pebble Beach, California, U.S.
- Burial place: Arlington National Cemetery
- Spouse: Josephine Daniels (m. 1917; died 1988)
- Children: 2
- Military career
- Allegiance: United States
- Branch: United States Army (1917–1918); United States Army Air Corps (1918–1941); United States Army Air Force (1941–1947); United States Air Force (1947–1959)
- Service years: 1917–1959
- Rank: General (Honorary)
- Commands: Eighth Air Force; Fifteenth Air Force; Twelfth Air Force
- Conflicts: World War I; Mexican Border Service; World War II; Pacific Theater; Doolittle Raid; Mediterranean Theater; European Theater; Pearl Harbor
- Awards: Medal of Honor; Army Distinguished Service Medal (2); Silver Star; Distinguished Flying Cross (3); Bronze Star Medal; Air Medal (4); Presidential Medal of Freedom; The Explorers Club Medal
- Other work: Air race pilot, test pilot, Shell Oil Company VP and director, chairman of Space Technology Laboratories and NACA

James Harold "Jimmy" Doolittle (December 14, 1896 – September 27, 1993) was an American military general and aviation pioneer who received the Medal of Honor for his raid on Japan during World War II, known as the Doolittle Raid in his honor. He made early coast-to-coast flights and record-breaking speed flights, won many flying races, and helped develop and flight-test instrument flying. According to the FAA, he was the first pilot ever to perform a successful instrument flight.

Doolittle grew up in Nome, Alaska. He attended the University of California, Berkeley, where he graduated with a Bachelor of Arts in 1922. That year, he made the first cross-country flight in an Airco DH.4, and in 1925, was awarded a doctorate in aeronautics from the Massachusetts Institute of Technology, the first such doctorate degree issued in the United States. In 1927, he performed the first outside loop, thought at the time to be a fatal aerobatic maneuver, and two years later, in 1929, pioneered the use of "blind flying", where a pilot relies on flight instruments alone, which later won him the Harmon Trophy and made all-weather airline operations practical.

Doolittle was a flying instructor during World War I and a reserve officer in the United States Army Air Corps, but was recalled to active duty during World War II. He was awarded the Medal of Honor for personal valor and leadership as commander of the Doolittle Raid, a bold long-range retaliatory air raid on some of the Japanese main islands on April 18, 1942, four months after the attack on Pearl Harbor. The raid used 16 North American B-25B Mitchell medium bombers with reduced armament to decrease weight and increase range, each with a crew of five and no escort fighter aircraft. It was a major morale booster for the United States and Doolittle was celebrated as a hero, making him one of the most important national figures of the war.

Doolittle was promoted to lieutenant general and commanded the Twelfth Air Force over North Africa, the Fifteenth Air Force over the Mediterranean, and the Eighth Air Force over Europe. He retired from the Air Force in 1959 but remained active in many technical fields. Doolittle was inducted into the National Aviation Hall of Fame in 1967, eight years after retirement and only five years after the Hall was founded. He was eventually promoted to general in 1985, presented to him by President Ronald Reagan 43 years after the Doolittle Raid. In 2003, he topped Air & Space/Smithsonian magazine's list of the greatest pilots of all time, and ten years later, Flying magazine ranked Doolittle sixth on its list of the 51 Heroes of Aviation. He died in 1993 at the age of 96, and was buried at Arlington National Cemetery.

== Early life and education ==
Doolittle was born December 14, 1896, in Alameda, California. He spent his youth in Nome, Alaska, where he earned a reputation as a boxer. His parents were Frank Henry Doolittle and Rosa (Rose) Cerenah Doolittle (née Shephard). By 1910, Jimmy Doolittle was attending school in Los Angeles. When his school attended the 1910 Los Angeles International Air Meet at Dominguez Field, Doolittle saw his first airplane.

He attended Los Angeles City College after graduating from Manual Arts High School, together with later film director Frank Capra, in Los Angeles. He entered the University of California, Berkeley, where he studied at the College of Mines. He was a member of Theta Kappa Nu fraternity, which later merged into Lambda Chi Alpha during the later stages of the Great Depression.

== Military career ==
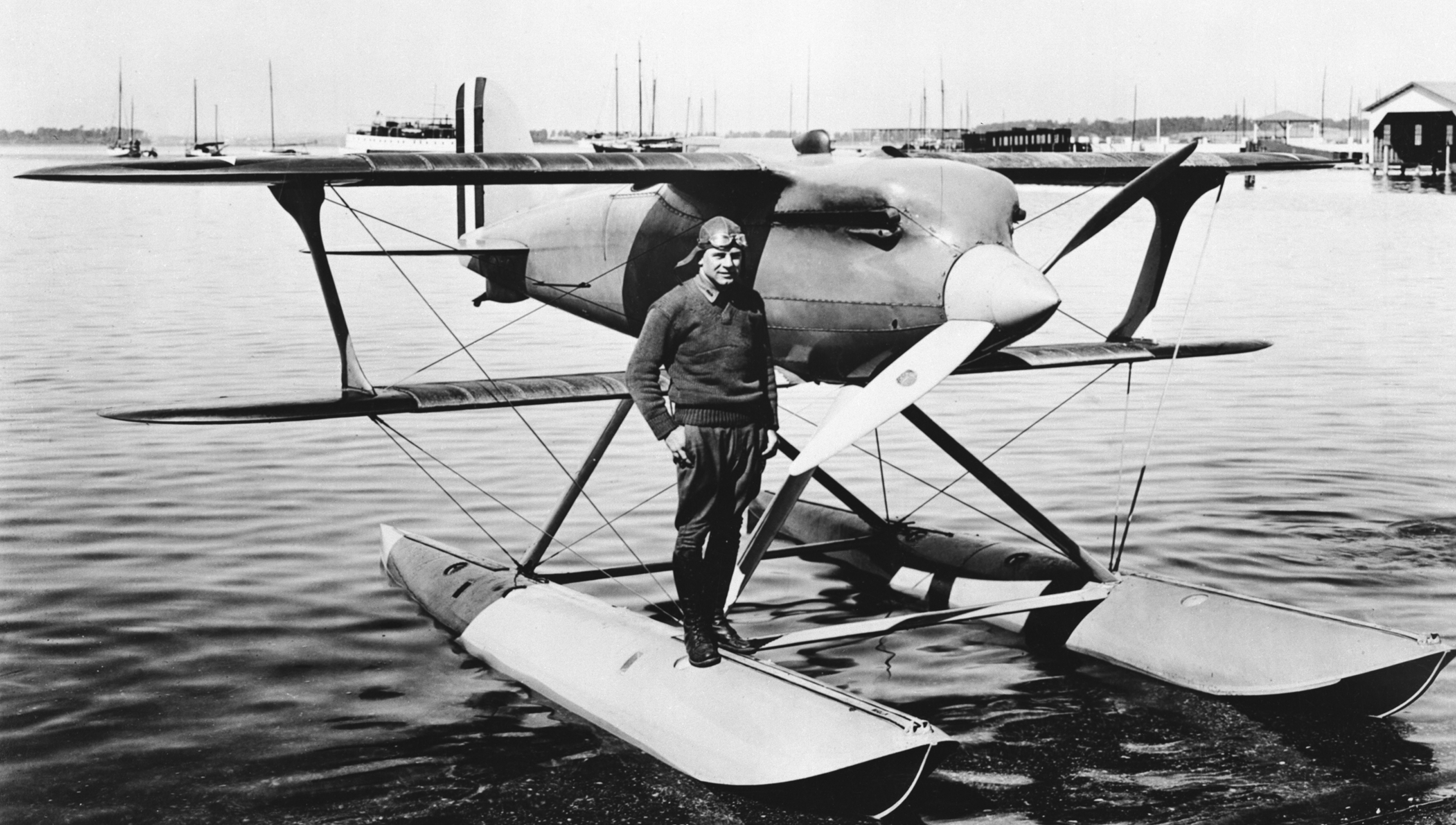
Doolittle on his Curtiss R3C-2 Racer, the plane in which he won the Schneider Trophy in 1925

Doolittle took a leave of absence in October 1917 to enlist in the Signal Corps Reserve as a flying cadet; he received ground training at the School of Military Aeronautics (an Army school) on the campus of the University of California, and flight-trained at Rockwell Field, California. Doolittle received his Reserve Military Aviator rating and was commissioned a second lieutenant in the Signal Officers Reserve Corps of the U.S. Army on March 11, 1918.

During World War I, Doolittle stayed in the United States as a flight instructor and performed his war service at Camp John Dick Aviation Concentration Center ("Camp Dick"), Texas; Wright Field, Ohio; Gerstner Field, Louisiana; Rockwell Field, Coronado, California; Kelly Field, Texas, and Eagle Pass, Texas.

Doolittle served at Rockwell as a flight leader and gunnery instructor. At Kelly Field, he served with the 104th Aero Squadron and with the 90th Aero Squadron of the 1st Surveillance Group. His detachment of the 90th Aero Squadron was based at Eagle Pass, patrolling the Mexican border. Recommended by three officers for retention in the Air Service during demobilization at the end of the war, Doolittle qualified by examination and received a Regular Army commission as a 1st Lieutenant, Air Service, on July 1, 1920.

On May 10, 1921, he was engineering officer and pilot for an expedition recovering a plane that had force-landed in a Mexican canyon on February 10 during a transcontinental flight attempt by Alexander Pearson Jr. Doolittle reached the plane on May 3 and found it serviceable, then returned May 8 with a replacement motor and four mechanics. The oil pressure of the new motor was inadequate, and Doolittle requested two pressure gauges, using carrier pigeons to communicate. The additional parts were dropped by air and installed, and Doolittle flew the plane to Del Rio, Texas, himself, taking off from a 400-yard (370 m) airstrip hacked out of the canyon floor.

Subsequently, he attended the Air Service Mechanical School at Kelly Field and the Aeronautical Engineering Course at McCook Field, Ohio. Having at last returned to complete his college degree, he earned a Bachelor of Arts from the University of California, Berkeley in 1922, and joined the Lambda Chi Alpha fraternity.

Doolittle was one of the most famous pilots during the inter-war period. On September 4, 1922, he made the first of many pioneering flights, flying a de Havilland DH-4—which was equipped with early navigational instruments—in the first cross-country flight, from Pablo Beach (now Jacksonville Beach), Florida, to Rockwell Field, Coronado, California, in 21 hours and 19 minutes, making only one refueling stop at Kelly Field. The U.S. Army awarded him the Distinguished Flying Cross.

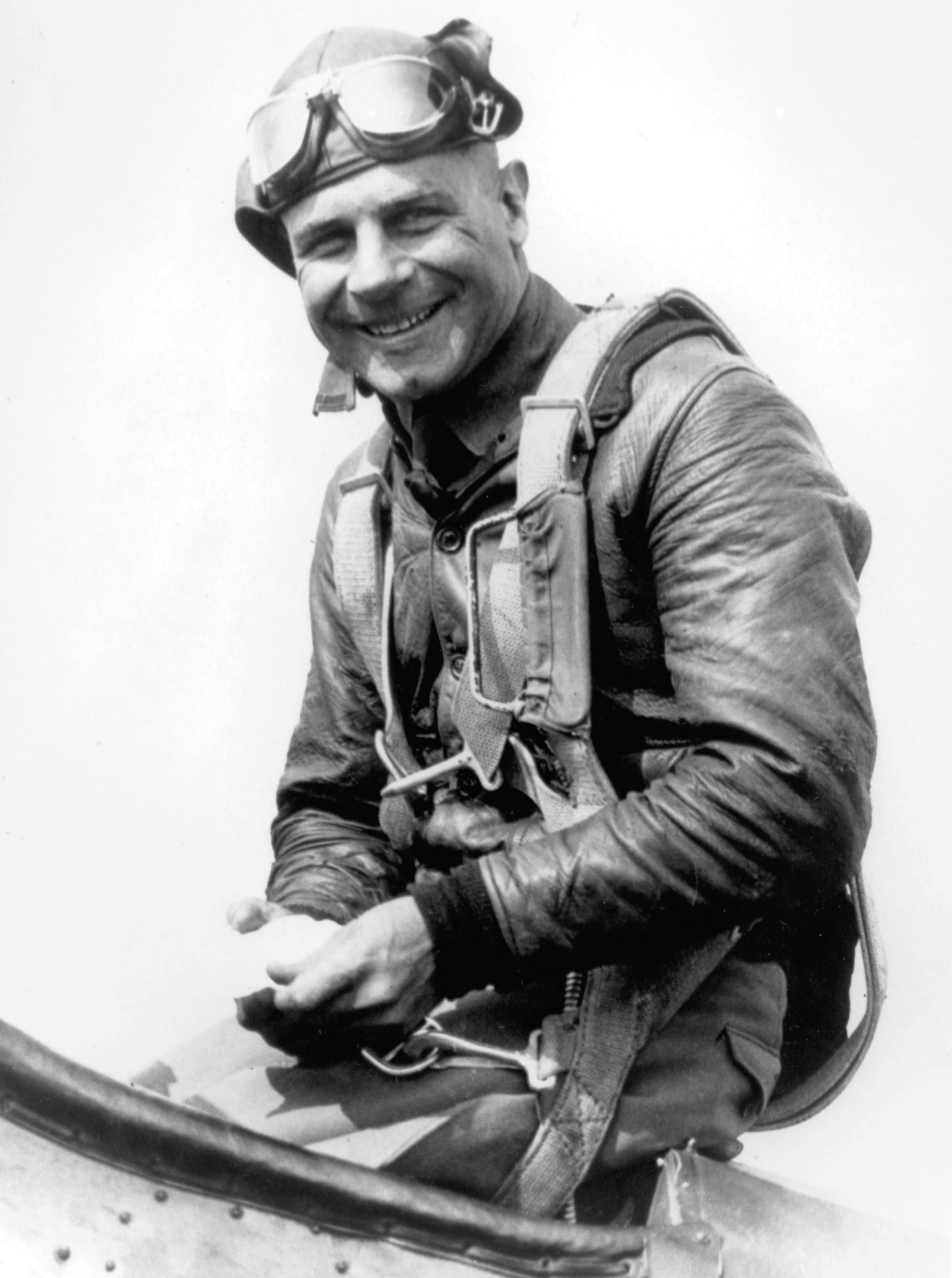
Doolittle in a pre–World War II photo

Within days after the transcontinental flight, he was at the Air Service Engineering School (a precursor to the Air Force Institute of Technology) at McCook Field, Dayton, Ohio. For Doolittle, the school assignment had special significance: "I had applied for the Engineering School because I thought there should be a better rapport between the aeronautical engineer and the pilot. It seemed to me that the engineers felt pilots were all a little crazy or else they wouldn't be pilots. The pilots felt the engineers as a group were, if not incompetent, at least not thoroughly acquainted with the pilot's viewpoint—that all the engineers did was zip slide rules back and forth and come out with erroneous results and bad aircraft. I thought from a philosophical point of view that it would be good to have engineers and pilots understand one another better. It seemed desirable to marry these two capabilities in one person—and I wanted to be that person."

In July 1923, after serving as a test pilot and aeronautical engineer at McCook Field, Doolittle entered the Massachusetts Institute of Technology. In March 1924, he conducted aircraft acceleration tests at McCook Field, which became the basis of his master's thesis and led to his second Distinguished Flying Cross. He received his SM degree in Aeronautics from MIT in June 1924. Because the Army had given him two years to get his degree and he had done it in just one, he immediately started working on his Sc.D. in Aeronautics, which he received in June 1925. His doctorate in aeronautical engineering was the first issued in the United States. He said that he considered his master's work more significant than his doctorate.

Following graduation, Doolittle attended special training in high-speed seaplanes at Naval Air Station Anacostia in Washington, D.C. He also served with the Naval Test Board at Mitchel Field, Long Island, New York, and was a familiar figure in air speed record attempts in the New York area. He won the Schneider Cup race in a Curtiss R3C in 1925 with an average speed of 232 miles per hour (373 km/h). For that feat, Doolittle was awarded the Mackay Trophy in 1926.

In April 1926, Doolittle was given a leave of absence to go to South America to perform demonstration flights for Curtiss Aircraft. In Chile, he broke both ankles while demonstrating his acrobatic abilities in an incident that was known as Night of the Pisco Sours. Despite having both ankles in casts, Doolittle put his Curtiss P-1 Hawk through aerial maneuvers that outdid the competition. He returned to the United States and was confined to Walter Reed Army Hospital for his injuries until April 1927. He was then assigned to McCook Field for experimental work, with additional duty as an instructor pilot to the 385th Bomb Squadron of the Air Corps Reserve. During this time, in 1927 he was the first to perform an outside loop, previously thought to be a fatal maneuver. Carried out in a Curtiss fighter at Wright Field in Ohio, Doolittle executed the dive from 10,000 feet (3,000 m), reached 280 miles per hour (450 km/h), bottomed out upside down, then climbed and completed the loop.

=== Instrument flight ===
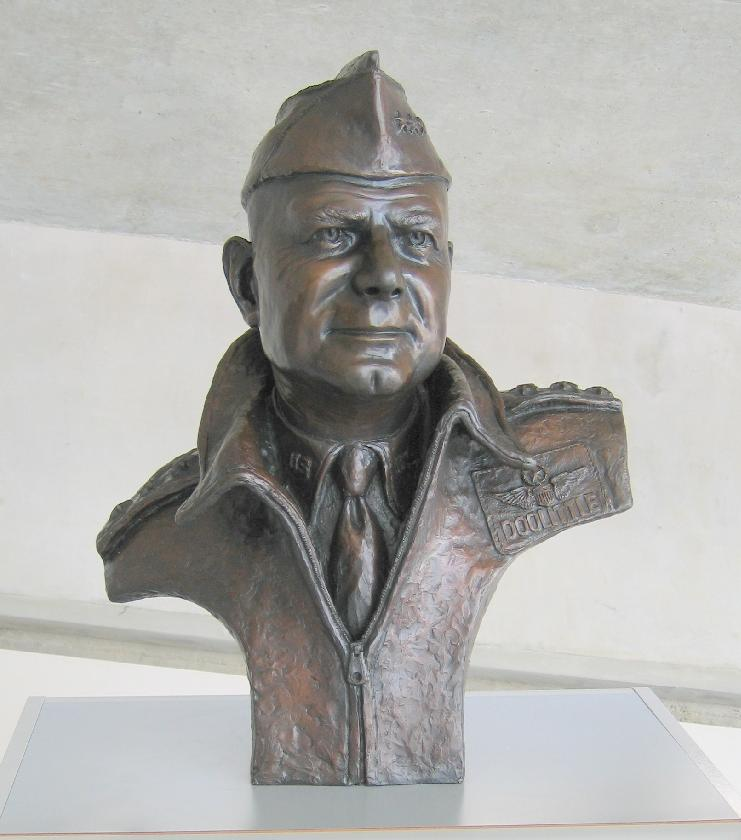
Bust of General Doolittle at the Imperial War Museum, Duxford

Doolittle's most important contribution to aeronautical technology was his early advancement of instrument flying. He was the first to recognize that true operational freedom in the air could not be achieved until pilots developed the ability to control and navigate aircraft in flight from takeoff run to landing rollout, regardless of the range of vision from the cockpit. Doolittle was the first to envision that a pilot could be trained to use instruments to fly through fog, clouds, precipitation of all forms, darkness, or any other impediment to visibility, and in spite of the pilot's own possibly convoluted motion sense inputs. Even at this early stage, the ability to control aircraft was getting beyond the motion sense capability of the pilot. That is, as aircraft became faster and more maneuverable, pilots could become seriously disoriented without visual cues from outside the cockpit, because aircraft could move in ways that pilots' senses could not accurately decipher.

Doolittle was also the first to recognize these psycho-physiological limitations of the human senses (particularly the motion sense inputs, i.e., up, down, left, right). He initiated the study of the relationships between the psychological effects of visual cues and motion senses. His research resulted in programs that trained pilots to read and understand navigational instruments. A pilot learned to "trust his instruments," not his senses, as visual cues and his motion sense inputs (what he sensed and "felt") could be incorrect or unreliable.

In 1929, he became the first pilot to take off, fly and land an airplane using instruments alone, without a view outside the cockpit. Having returned to Mitchell Field that September, he helped develop blind-flying equipment. He helped develop, and was then the first to test, the now universally used artificial horizon and directional gyroscope. He attracted wide newspaper attention with this feat of "blind" flying and later received the Harmon Trophy for conducting the experiments. These accomplishments made all-weather airline operations practical.

=== Reserve status ===
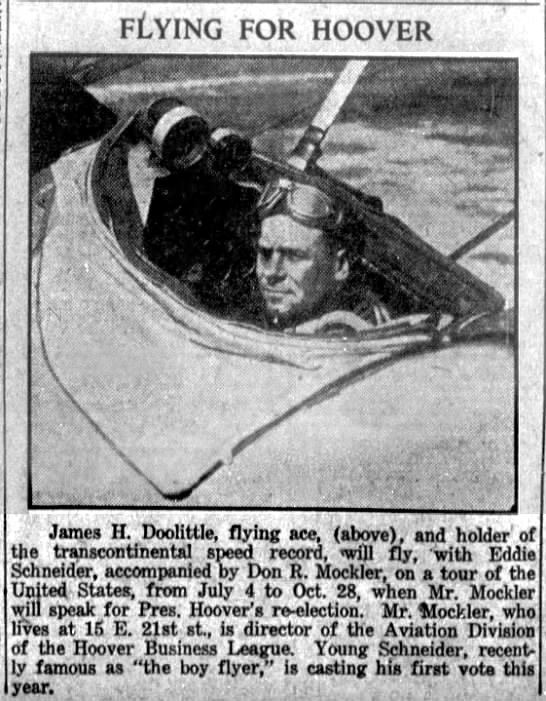
1932, flying for the Hoover League

In January 1930, Doolittle advised the Army on the construction of Floyd Bennett Field in New York City. Doolittle resigned his regular commission on February 15, 1930, and was commissioned a Major in the Air Reserve Corps a month later, being named manager of the Aviation Department of Shell Oil Company, in which capacity he conducted numerous aviation tests. While in the Reserve, he also returned to temporary active duty with the Army frequently to conduct tests.

Doolittle helped influence Shell Oil Company to produce the first quantities of 100 octane aviation gasoline. High octane fuel was crucial to the high-performance planes that were developed in the late 1930s.

In 1931, Doolittle won the first Bendix Trophy race from Burbank, California, to Cleveland, in a Laird Super Solution biplane.

In 1932, Doolittle set the world's high-speed record for land planes at 296 miles per hour (476 km/h) in the Shell Speed Dash. Later, he took the Thompson Trophy race at Cleveland in the notorious Gee Bee R-1 racer with a speed averaging 252 miles per hour (406 km/h). After having won the three big air racing trophies of the time, the Schneider, Bendix, and Thompson, he officially retired from air racing, stating, "I have yet to hear anyone engaged in this work dying of old age."

In April 1934, Doolittle was selected to be a member of the Baker Board. Chaired by former Secretary of War Newton D. Baker, the board was convened during the Air Mail scandal to study Air Corps organization. In 1940, he became president of the Institute of Aeronautical Science.

The development of 100-octane aviation gasoline on an economic scale was due in part to Doolittle, who had become aviation manager of Shell Oil Company. Around 1935 he convinced Shell to invest in refining capacity to produce 100-octane fuel on a scale that nobody needed since no aircraft existed that required a fuel that nobody made. Some fellow employees would call his effort "Doolittle's million-dollar blunder" but time would prove him correct. Before this the Army had considered 100-octane tests using pure octane but at $25 a gallon it did not happen. By 1936 tests at Wright Field using a cheaper alternative to pure octane proved the value of the fuel and both Shell and Standard Oil of New Jersey would win the contract to supply test quantities for the Army. By 1938 the price was down to 17.5 cents a gallon, only 2.5 cents more than 87 octane fuel. By the end of WW II, the price would be down to 16 cents a gallon and the U.S. armed forces would be consuming 20 million gallons a day.

Doolittle returned to active duty in the U.S. Army Air Corps on July 1, 1940, with the rank of Major. He was assigned as the assistant district supervisor of the Central Air Corps Procurement District at Indianapolis and Detroit, where he worked with large auto manufacturers on the conversion of their plants to aircraft production. The following August, he went to England as a member of a special mission and brought back information about other countries' air forces and military build-ups.

== Doolittle Raid ==
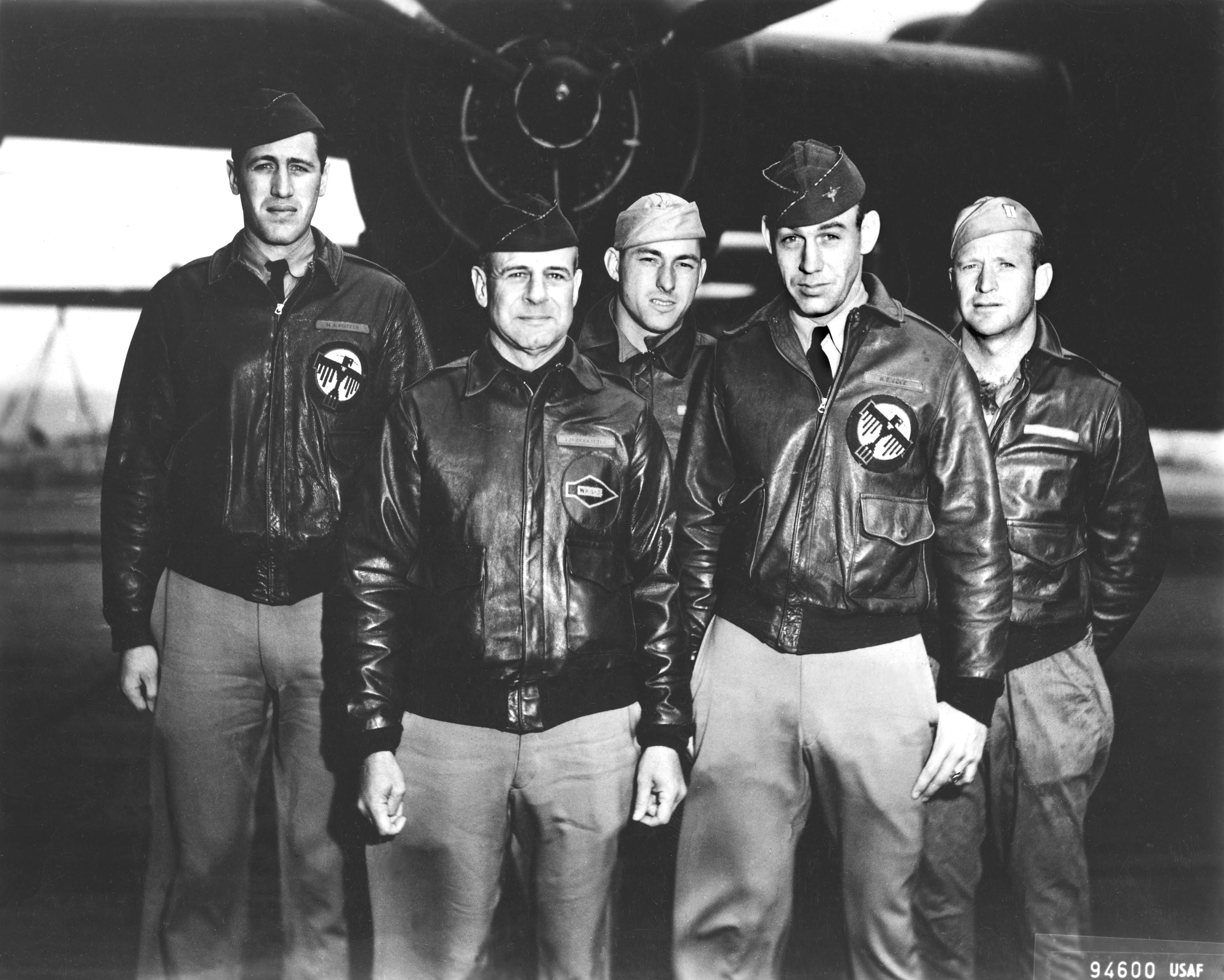
Doolittle and his crew just before takeoff for the mission. From left to right: Lt. Henry A. Potter, navigator; Doolittle, pilot; SSgt. Fred A. Braemer, bombardier; Lt. Richard E. Cole, copilot; SSgt. Paul J. Leonard, flight engineer/gunner. On USS Hornet (CV-8), 18 April 1942.

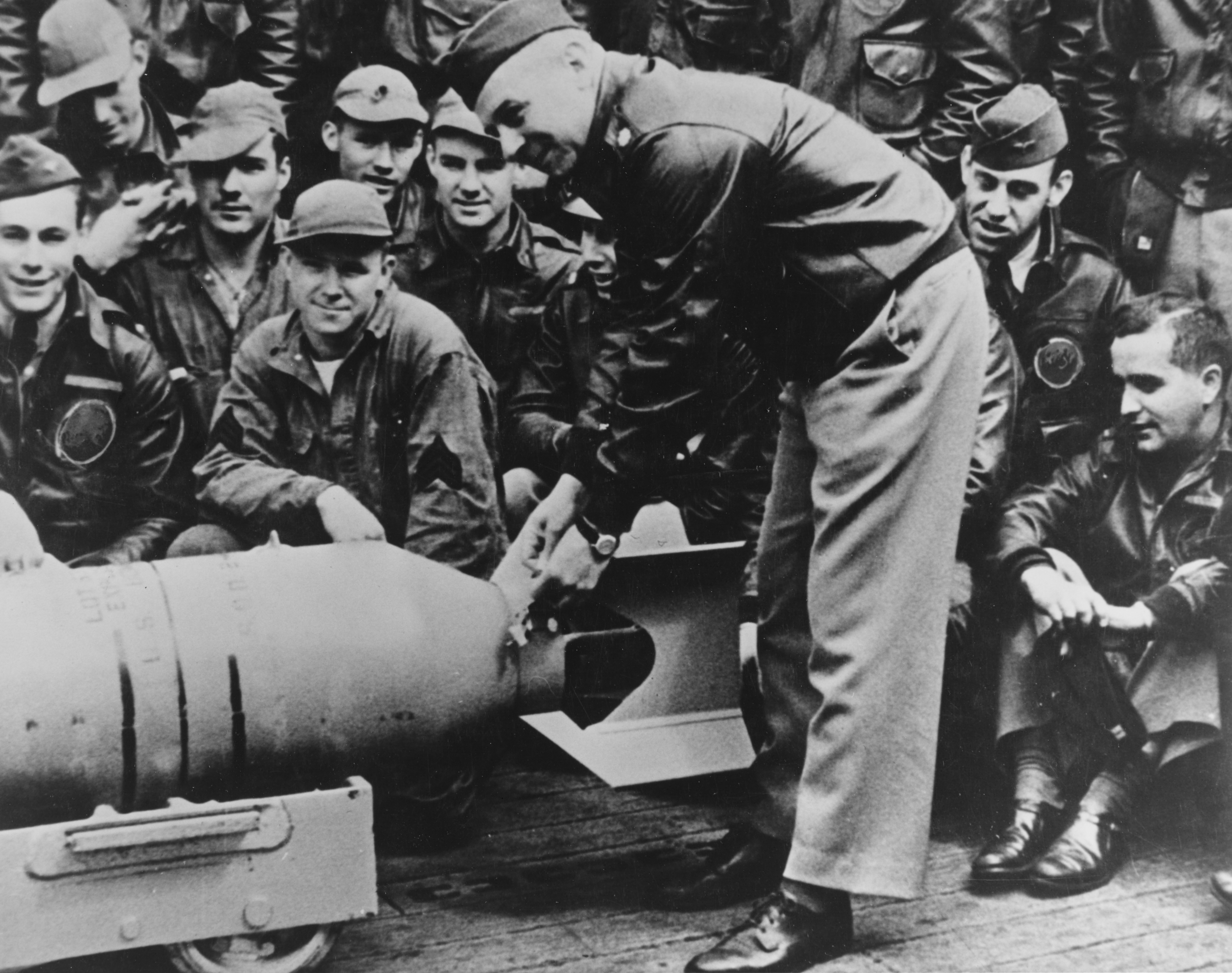
Doolittle on the flight deck of USS Hornet (CV-8)

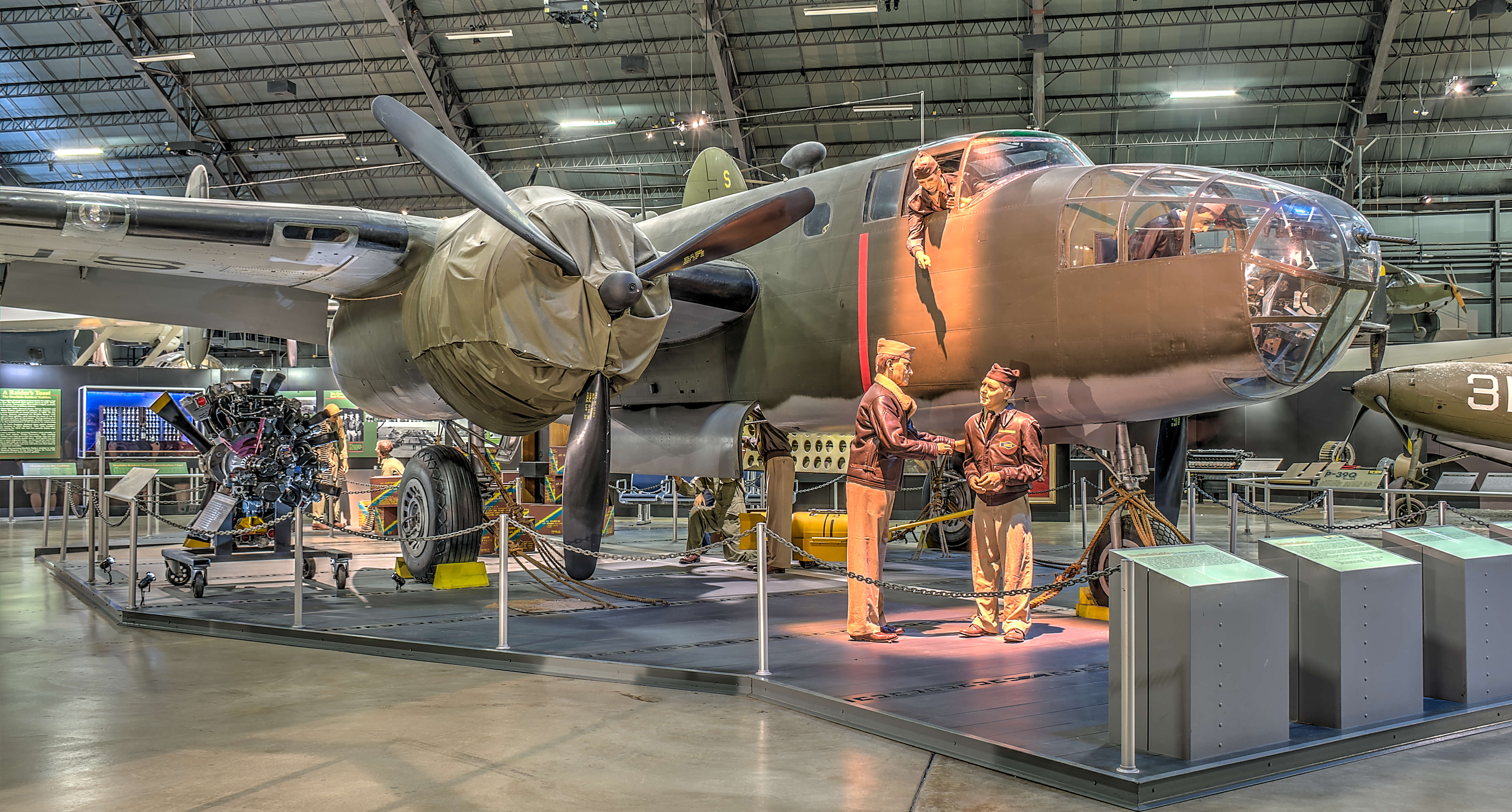
Exhibit at USAF Museum depicting a B-25B Mitchell in preparation for the Doolittle Raid.

Following the reorganization of the Army Air Corps into the USAAF in June 1941, Doolittle was promoted to lieutenant colonel on January 2, 1942, and assigned to Army Air Forces Headquarters to plan the first retaliatory air raid on the Japanese homeland following the attack on Pearl Harbor. He volunteered for and received General H.H. Arnold's approval to lead the top-secret attack of 16 North American B-25 Mitchell medium bombers from the aircraft carrier USS Hornet, with targets in Tokyo, Kobe, Yokohama, Osaka and Nagoya.

After training at Eglin Field and Wagner Field in northwest Florida, Doolittle, his aircraft, and volunteer flight crews proceeded to McClellan Field, California for aircraft modifications at the Sacramento Air Depot, followed by a short final flight to Naval Air Station Alameda, California for embarkation aboard the aircraft carrier USS Hornet. On April 18, Doolittle and his 16 B-25 crews took off from Hornet, reached Japan, and bombed their targets. Fifteen of the planes then headed for their recovery airfield in China, while one crew chose to land in Russia due to their bomber's unusually high fuel consumption. As did most of the other crewmen who participated in the one-way mission, Doolittle and his crew bailed out safely over China when their B-25 ran out of fuel. By then, they had been flying for about 12 hours, it was nighttime, the weather was stormy, and Doolittle was unable to locate their landing field. Doolittle came down in a rice paddy (saving a previously injured ankle from breaking) near Quzhou. He and his crew linked up after the bailout and were helped through Japanese lines by Chinese guerrillas and American missionary John Birch. Other aircrews were not so fortunate, although most eventually reached safety with the help of friendly Chinese. Seven crew members lost their lives, four as a result of being captured and murdered by the Japanese and three due to an aircraft crash or while parachuting. Doolittle thought he would be court martialed due to having to launch the raid ahead of schedule after being spotted by a Japanese patrol boat and the loss of all the aircraft.

== Zhejiang-Jiangxi campaign ==
After the raid, the Japanese Imperial Army began the Zhejiang-Jiangxi campaign (also known as Operation Sei-go) to prevent these eastern coastal provinces of China from being used again for an attack on Japan and to take revenge on the Chinese people. An area of some 20,000 sq mi (50,000 km^{2}) was laid waste. "Like a swarm of locusts, they left behind nothing but destruction and chaos," eyewitness Father Wendelin Dunker wrote. The Japanese killed an estimated 10,000 Chinese civilians during their search for Doolittle's men. People who aided the airmen were tortured before they were killed. Father Dunker wrote of the destruction of the town of Ihwang: "They shot any man, woman, child, cow, hog, or just about anything that moved, They raped any woman from the ages of 10–65, and before burning the town they thoroughly looted it ... None of the humans shot were buried either ..." The Japanese entered Nancheng (Jiangxi), population 50,000 on June 11, "beginning a reign of terror so horrendous that missionaries would later dub it 'the Rape of Nancheng.' " evoking memories of the infamous Rape of Nanjing five years before. Less than a month later, the Japanese forces put what remained of the city to the torch. "This planned burning was carried on for three days," one Chinese newspaper reported, "and the city of Nancheng became charred earth."

When Japanese troops moved out of the Zhejiang and Jiangxi areas in mid-August, they left behind a trail of devastation. Chinese estimates put the civilian death toll at 250,000. The Imperial Japanese Army had also spread cholera, typhoid, plague infected fleas and dysentery pathogens. The Japanese biological warfare Unit 731 brought almost 300 pounds (140 kg) of paratyphoid and anthrax to be left in contaminated food and contaminated wells with the withdrawal of the army from areas around Yushan, Kinhwa and Futsin. Around 1,700 Japanese troops died out of a total 10,000 Japanese soldiers who fell ill with disease when their biological weapons attack rebounded on their own forces.

Doolittle went on to fly more combat missions as commander of the 12th Air Force in North Africa, for which he was awarded four Air Medals. He later commanded the 12th, 15th and 8th Air Forces in Europe. The other surviving members of the Doolittle raid also went on to new assignments.

Doolittle received the Medal of Honor from President Franklin D. Roosevelt at the White House for planning and leading his raid on Japan. His citation reads: "For conspicuous leadership above and beyond the call of duty, involving personal valor and intrepidity at an extreme hazard to life. With the apparent certainty of being forced to land in enemy territory or to perish at sea, Lt. Col. Doolittle personally led a squadron of Army bombers, manned by volunteer crews, in a highly destructive raid on the Japanese mainland." He was also promoted to brigadier general.

The Doolittle Raid is viewed by historians as a major morale-building victory for the United States. Although the damage done to Japanese war industry was minor, the raid showed the Japanese that their homeland was vulnerable to air attack, and forced them to withdraw several front-line fighter units from Pacific war zones for homeland defense. More significantly, Japanese commanders considered the raid deeply embarrassing, and their attempt to close the perceived gap in their Pacific defense perimeter led directly to the decisive American victory at the Battle of Midway in June 1942.

When asked from where the Tokyo raid was launched, President Roosevelt coyly said its base was Shangri-La, a fictional paradise from the popular novel and film Lost Horizon. In the same vein, the U.S. Navy named one of its Essex-class fleet carriers USS Shangri-La.

== World War II, post-raid ==
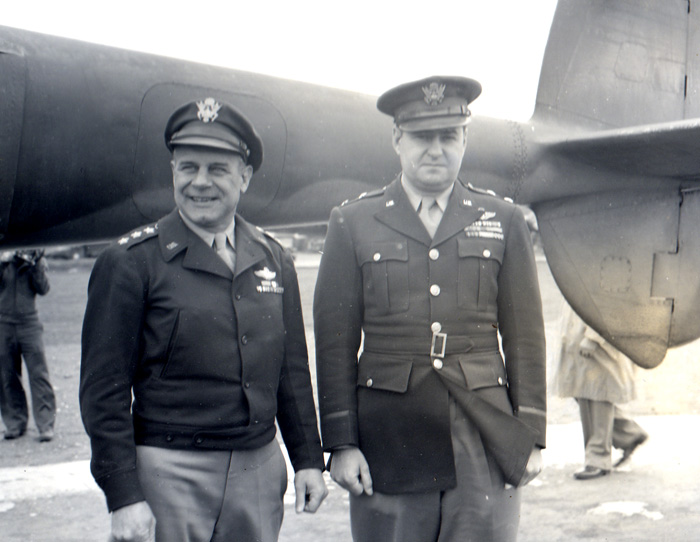
Lt. Gen. Jimmy Doolittle (left) with Maj. Gen. Curtis LeMay (right), standing between tail booms of a Lockheed P-38 Lightning in Britain, 1944

In July 1942, as a brigadier general—he had been promoted by two grades on the day after the Tokyo attack, bypassing the rank of full colonel—Doolittle was assigned to the nascent Eighth Air Force. This followed his rejection by General Douglas MacArthur as commander of the South West Pacific Area to replace Major General George Brett. Major General Frank Andrews first turned down the position and offered a choice between George Kenney and Doolittle, MacArthur chose Kenney. In September, Doolittle became commanding general of the Twelfth Air Force, soon to be operating in North Africa. He was promoted to major general in November 1942, and in March 1943 became commanding general of the Northwest African Strategic Air Force, a unified command of U.S. Army Air Force and Royal Air Force units. In September, he commanded a raid against the Italian town of Battipaglia that was so thorough in its destruction that General Carl Andrew Spaatz sent him a joking message: "You're slipping Jimmy. There's one crabapple tree and one stable still standing."

Maj. Gen. Doolittle took command of the Fifteenth Air Force in the Mediterranean Theater of Operations in November 1943. On June 10, he flew as co-pilot with Jack Sims, fellow Tokyo Raider, in a Martin B-26 Marauder of the 320th Bombardment Group, 442nd Bombardment Squadron on a mission to attack gun emplacements at Pantelleria. Doolittle continued to fly, despite the risk of capture, while being privy to the Ultra secret, which was that the German encryption systems had been broken by the British. From January 1944 to September 1945, he held his largest command, the Eighth Air Force (8 AF) in England as a lieutenant general, his promotion date being March 13, 1944, and the highest rank ever held by an active reserve officer in modern times.

=== Escort fighter tactics ===
Doolittle's major influence on the European air war occurred late in 1943—and primarily after he took command of the Eighth Air Force on January 6, 1944—when he changed the policy of requiring escorting fighters to remain with their bombers at all times. Instead, he permitted escort fighters to fly far ahead of the bombers' combat box formations, allowing them to freely engage the German fighters lying in wait for the bombers. Throughout most of 1944, this tactic negated the effectiveness of the twin-engined Zerstörergeschwader heavy fighter wings and single-engined Sturmgruppen of heavily armed Fw 190As by clearing the Luftwaffe's bomber destroyers from ahead of the bomber formations. After the bombers had hit their targets, the American fighters were free to strafe German airfields, transportation, and other "targets of opportunity" on their return flight to base. These tasks were initially performed with Lockheed P-38 Lightnings and Republic P-47 Thunderbolts through the end of 1943. They were progressively replaced with the long-ranged North American P-51 Mustangs as the spring of 1944 wore on.

== Postwar ==
=== Doolittle Board ===
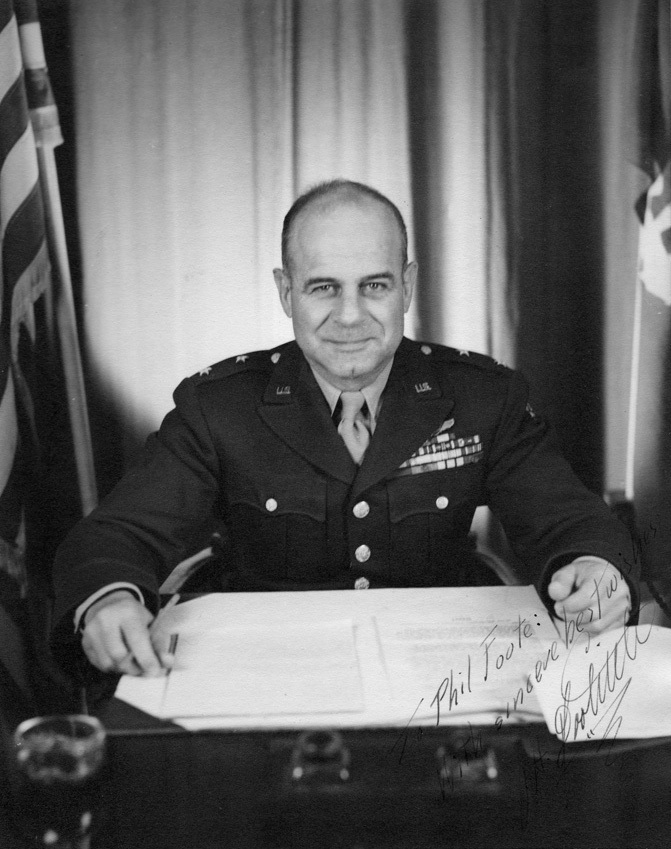
Personalized photo of then-Major General Jimmy Doolittle

Secretary of War Robert P. Patterson asked Doolittle on March 27, 1946, to head a commission on the relationships between officers and enlisted men in the Army called the "Doolittle Board" or the "GI Gripes Board". The Army implemented many of the board's recommendations in the postwar volunteer Army, though many professional officers and noncommissioned officers thought that the Board "destroyed the discipline of the Army". Columnist Hanson Baldwin said that the Doolittle Board "caused severe damage to service effectiveness by recommendations intended to 'democratize' the Army—a concept that is self-contradictory".

=== U.S. space program ===
Doolittle became acquainted with the field of space science in its infancy. He wrote in his autobiography, "I became interested in rocket development in the 1930s when I met Robert H. Goddard, who laid the foundation" in the US. "While with Shell [Oil] I worked with him on the development of a type of [rocket] fuel." Harry Guggenheim, whose foundation sponsored Goddard's work, and Charles Lindbergh, who encouraged Goddard's efforts, arranged for (then Major) Doolittle to discuss with Goddard a special blend of gasoline. In October 1938, Doolittle flew to Roswell, New Mexico, where he received a tour of Goddard's workshop and a "short course" in rocketry and space travel. He then wrote a memo, including a rather detailed description of Goddard's rocket. In closing, he said, "interplanetary transportation is probably a dream of the very distant future, but with the moon only a quarter of a million miles away—who knows!" In July 1941, he wrote Goddard that he was still interested in rocket propulsion research. The Army, however, was interested only in JATO at this point. Doolittle was concerned about the state of rocketry in the US and remained in touch with Goddard.

Shortly after World War II, Doolittle spoke about Goddard's work to a well-attended American Rocket Society conference. He later said that at that time the aeronautics field in the US "had not given much credence to the tremendous potential of rocketry.

In 1956, Doolittle was appointed chairman of the National Advisory Committee for Aeronautics (NACA) because the previous chairman, Jerome C. Hunsaker, thought Doolittle to be more sympathetic to the rocket, which was increasing in importance as a scientific tool as well as a weapon. The NACA Special Committee on Space Technology was organized in January 1958 and chaired by Guy Stever to determine the requirements of a national space program and what additions were needed to NACA technology. Doolittle, Dr. Hugh Dryden and Stever selected committee members including Dr. Wernher von Braun from the Army Ballistic Missile Agency, Sam Hoffman of Rocketdyne, Abe Hyatt of the Office of Naval Research and Colonel Norman Appold from the USAF missile program, considering their potential contributions to US space programs and ability to educate NACA people in space science.

=== Reserve status ===
On 5 January 1946, Doolittle reverted to inactive reserve status in the Army Air Forces in the grade of lieutenant general, a rarity in those days when reserve officers were usually limited to the rank of major general or rear admiral, a restriction that would not end in the US armed forces until the 21st century. He retired from the United States Army on 10 May 1946. On 18 September 1947, his reserve commission as a general officer was transferred to the newly established United States Air Force. Doolittle returned to Shell Oil as a vice president, and later as a director.

In the summer of 1946, Doolittle went to Stockholm where he consulted about the "ghost rockets" that had been observed over Scandinavia.

On January 24, 1946, Doolittle became the first president of the Air Force Association, an organization which he helped create.

In 1948, Doolittle advocated the desegregation of the US military. He wrote, "I am convinced that the solution to the situation is to forget that they are colored." Industry was in the process of integrating, Doolittle said, "and it is going to be forced on the military. You are merely postponing the inevitable and you might as well take it gracefully."

In March 1951, Doolittle was appointed a special assistant to the Chief of Staff of the Air Force, serving as a civilian in scientific matters which led to Air Force ballistic missile and space programs. In 1952, following a string of three air crashes in two months at Elizabeth, New Jersey, one of which killed Robert P. Patterson, the Secretary of War who created the Doolittle Commission, President Harry S. Truman appointed him to lead a presidential commission examining the safety of urban airports. The report "Airports and Their Neighbors" led to zoning requirements for buildings near approaches, early noise control requirements, and initial work on "super airports" with 10,000-foot (3,000 m) runways, suited to 150 ton aircraft.

Doolittle was appointed a life member of the MIT Corporation, the university's board of trustees, an uncommon permanent appointment, and served as an MIT Corporation Member for 40 years.

In 1954, President Dwight D. Eisenhower asked Doolittle to perform a study of the Central Intelligence Agency; the resulting work was known as the Doolittle Report, 1954, and was classified for a number of years.

From 1957 to 1958, he was chairman of the National Advisory Committee for Aeronautics (NACA). This period was during the events of Sputnik, Vanguard and Explorer. He was the last person to hold this position, as the NACA was superseded by NASA. Doolittle was asked to serve as the first NASA administrator, but he turned it down.

Doolittle retired from Air Force Reserve duty on February 28, 1959. He remained active in other capacities, including chairman of the board of TRW Space Technology Laboratories. Doolittle Drive at TRW's Space Park was named in his honor.

== Personal life ==
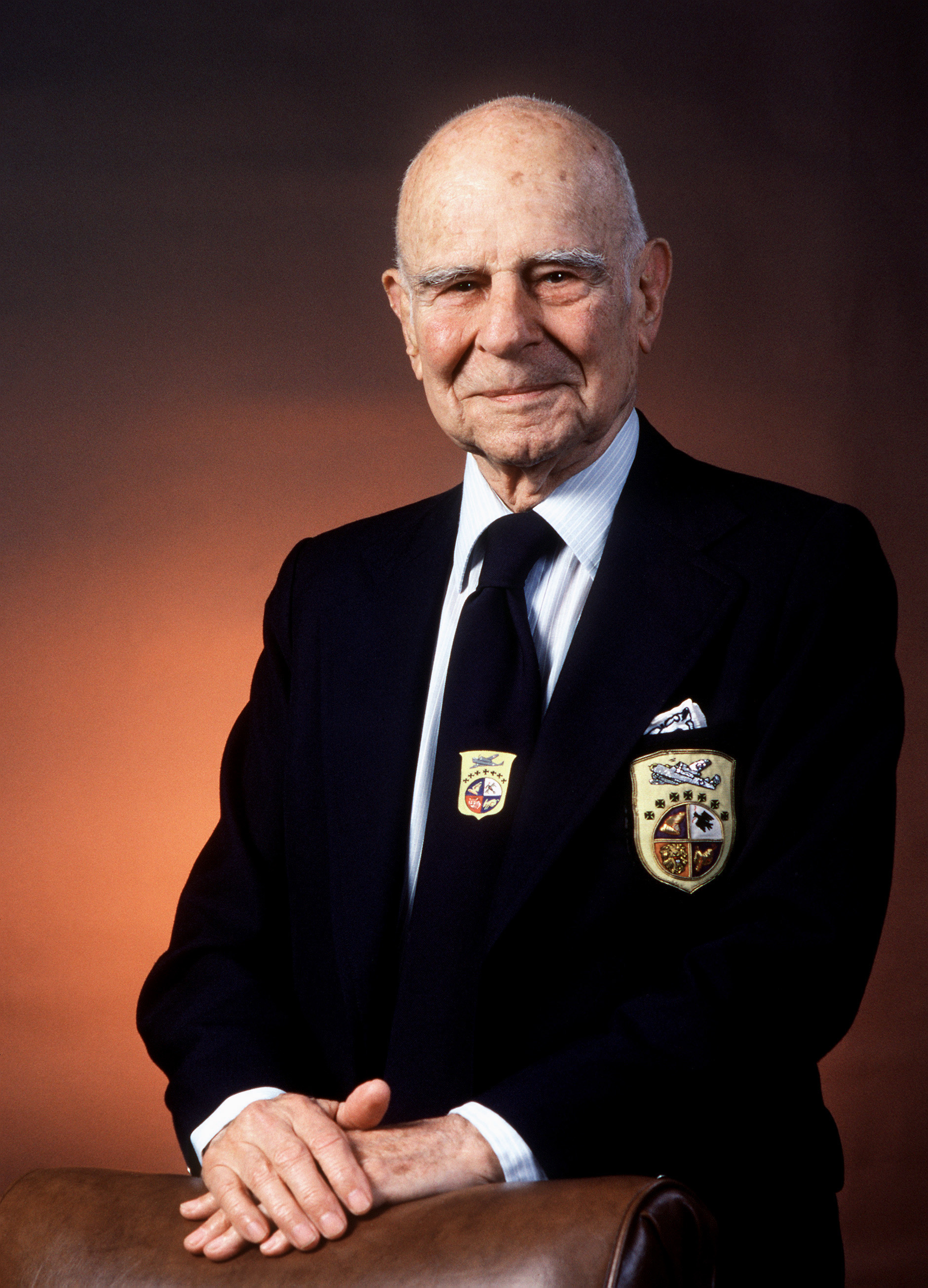
Doolittle photographed in 1986

Doolittle married Josephine "Joe" E. Daniels on December 24, 1917. At a dinner celebration after Jimmy Doolittle's first all-instrument flight in 1929, Josephine Doolittle asked her guests to sign her white damask tablecloth. Later, she embroidered the names in black. She continued this tradition, collecting hundreds of signatures from the aviation world. The tablecloth was donated to the Smithsonian Institution. Married for exactly 71 years, Josephine Doolittle died on December 24, 1988, five years before her husband.

The Doolittles had two sons, James Jr., and John. Both became military officers and pilots. James Jr. was an A-26 Invader pilot in the U.S. Army Air Forces during World War II and later a fighter pilot in the U.S. Air Force in the late 1940s through the late 1950s, reaching the rank of major and command of the 524th Fighter-Bomber Squadron, piloting the F-101 Voodoo. He died by suicide in 1958, aged 38.

The other son, John P. Doolittle, retired from the Air Force as a colonel, and his grandson, Colonel James H. Doolittle III, was the vice commander of the Air Force Flight Test Center at Edwards Air Force Base, California.

Doolittle senior died of a stroke at the age of 96 in Pebble Beach, California, on September 27, 1993, and is buried at Arlington National Cemetery in Virginia, near Washington, D.C., next to his wife. His funeral saw a flyover of a B-25 Mitchell ("Miss Mitchell") and USAF Eighth Air Force bombers from Barksdale Air Force Base, Louisiana. After a brief graveside service, fellow Doolittle Raider Bill Bower began the final tribute on the bugle. When emotion took over, Doolittle's great-grandson, Paul Dean Crane Jr., played Taps.

Doolittle was initiated to the Scottish Rite Freemasonry, where he took the 33rd degree, becoming also a Shriner.

== Dates of military rank ==
Insignia	Rank	Service and components	Date
No insignia	Aviation Cadet	United States Army Reserve (Officers Reserve Corps); Signal Corps (United States Army)	6 October 1917
No insignia	Private First Class	United States Army Reserve (Enlisted Reserve Corps)	10 November 1917
	Second Lieutenant	United States Army Reserve (Officers Reserve Corps) (Signal Corps)	11 March 1918
	Second Lieutenant	Regular Army (United States Army Air Service)	1 July (accepted 19 September) 1920
	First Lieutenant	Regular Army (United States Army Air Service)	1 July 1920; Resigned 15 February 1930
	Major	United States Army Reserve (Specialist Reserve Corps)	5 March 1930
	Major	United States Army Reserve (United States Army Air Corps)	1 July 1940
	Lieutenant Colonel	Army of the United States (United States Army Air Forces)	2 January 1942
	Brigadier General	Army of the United States (United States Army Air Forces)	23 April 1942
	Major General	Army of the United States (United States Army Air Forces)	20 November 1942
	Lieutenant General	Army of the United States (United States Army Air Forces)	13 March 1944
	Lieutenant General	Army of the United States (United States Army Air Forces Reserve)	5 January 1946
	Brigadier General	Regular Army (United States Army Air Forces)	1 May 1946
	Lieutenant General	United States Army Air Forces	10 May 1946
	Lieutenant General	United States Air Force Air Force Reserve Command	18 September 1947
	Lieutenant General	United States Air Force Air Force Reserve Command Retired List	28 February 1959
	General (Honorary)	United States Air Force Air Force Reserve Command Retired List	4 April 1985

== Honors and awards ==
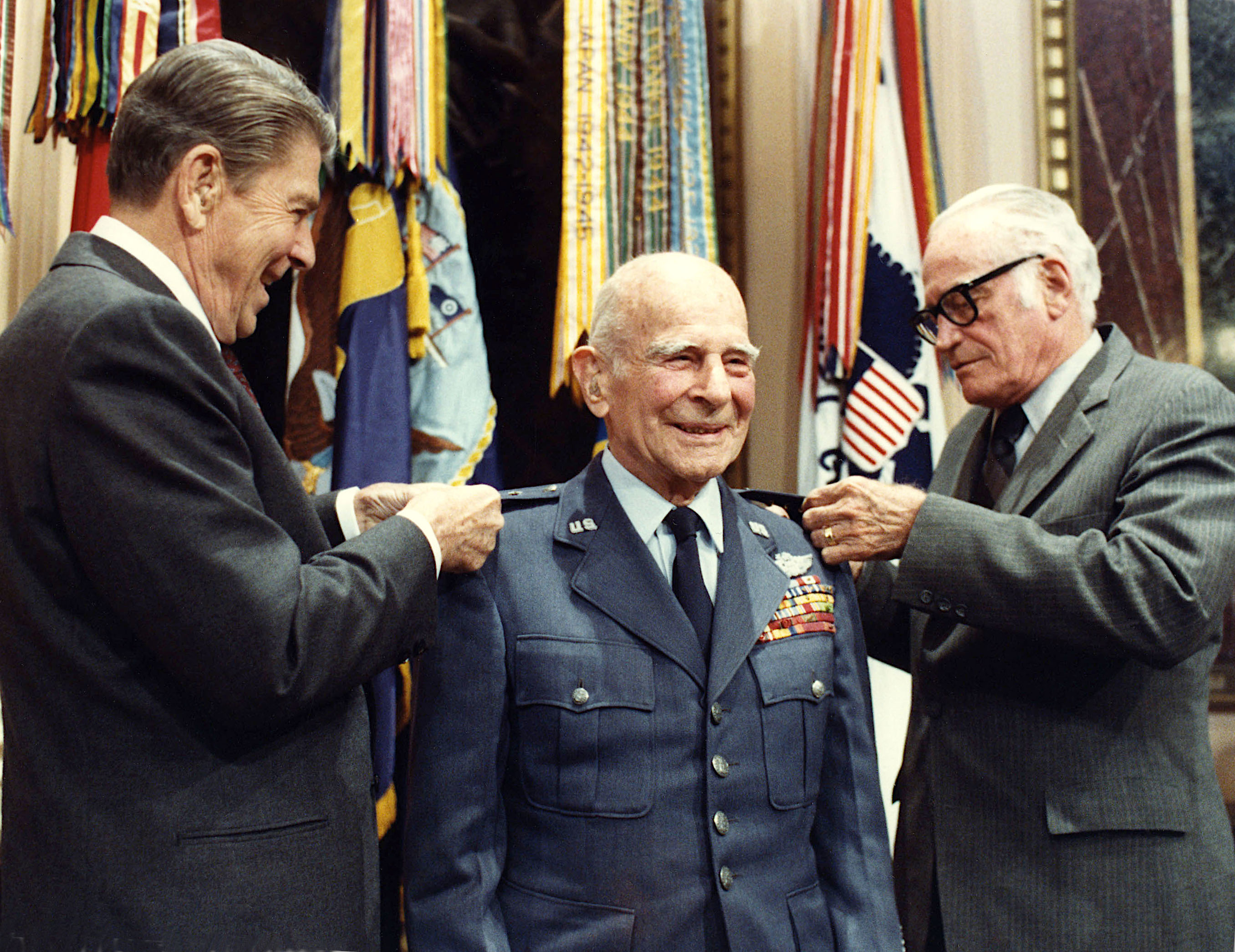
Doolittle is awarded a fourth star, pinned on by President Ronald Reagan (left) and Senator Barry Goldwater (right), April 10, 1985.

On April 4, 1985, President Ronald Reagan promoted Doolittle to the rank of full four-star general (O-10) on the U.S. Air Force retired list. Initially, Senator Barry Goldwater had sponsored legislation to waive Doolittle's ineligibility by statute, since he was ineligible for the rank as a reservist as well as for lack of being on active duty. However, the legislation stalled in the House, causing Goldwater to request that Reagan promote him with only Senate consent. This was arguably unlawful because of the Senate's inability to waive statutory restrictions. In a later ceremony, President Ronald Reagan and Senator and retired Air Force Reserve Major General Barry Goldwater pinned on Doolittle's four-star insignia. Later, in 1986, the Comptroller General ruled that the promotion was unlawful for pay or benefit purposes due to the lack of implementing legislation. This effectively made it entirely honorary.

In addition to his Medal of Honor for the Tokyo raid, Doolittle received the Presidential Medal of Freedom, two Distinguished Service Medals, the Silver Star, three Distinguished Flying Crosses, the Bronze Star Medal, four Air Medals, and decorations from Belgium, China, Ecuador, France, Great Britain, and Poland. He was the first American to be awarded both the Medal of Honor and the Medal of Freedom. He is also one of only two persons (the other being Douglas MacArthur) to receive both the Medal of Honor and a British knighthood, when he was appointed an honorary Knight Commander of the Order of the Bath.

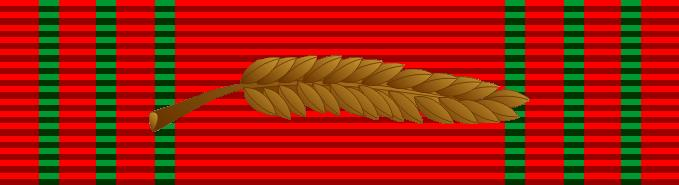

U.S. Air Force Command Pilot Badge
Honorary Naval Aviator Badge (1981)
Medal of Honor	Army Distinguished Service Medal with bronze oak leaf cluster	Silver Star
Distinguished Flying Cross with two bronze oak leaf clusters	Bronze Star	Air Medal with three bronze oak leaf clusters
Presidential Medal of Freedom	World War I Victory Medal	Army of Occupation of Germany Medal
American Defense Service Medal with one service star	American Campaign Medal	Asiatic-Pacific Campaign Medal with bronze campaign star
European-African-Middle Eastern Campaign Medal with one silver and three bronze campaign stars	World War II Victory Medal	Armed Forces Reserve Medal with bronze hourglass device
Air Force Longevity Service Award with four bronze oak leaf clusters	National Defense Service Medal	Order of the Bath; Knight Commander (KCB) (United Kingdom)
Order of the Condor of the Andes; Officer (Bolivia)	Order of Abdon Calderón; 1st Class (Ecuador)	Order of Ouissam Alaouite; Knight (Morocco)
Order of Polonia Restituta (Knight's Cross) (Poland)	Légion d'honneur Grand-Cross (France)	War Cross 1939–1945 with bronze Palm (France)
War Cross with bronze Palm (Belgium)	Order of the Cloud and Banner; 3rd Grade (Republic of China)	Medal of the Armed Forces; A-1 (Republic of China)

In 1972, Doolittle received the Tony Jannus Award for his distinguished contributions to commercial aviation, in recognition of the development of instrument flight.

Doolittle was awarded the Public Welfare Medal from the National Academy of Sciences in 1959. In 1983, he was awarded the United States Military Academy's Sylvanus Thayer Award. He was inducted in the Motorsports Hall of Fame of America as the only member of the air racing category in the inaugural class of 1989, and into the Aerospace Walk of Honor in the inaugural class of 1990.

=== Medal of Honor citation ===
For conspicuous leadership above the call of duty, involving personal valor and intrepidity at an extreme hazard to life. With the apparent certainty of being forced to land in enemy territory or to perish at sea, Gen. Doolittle personally led a squadron of Army bombers, manned by volunteer crews, in a highly destructive raid on the Japanese mainland.

Other awards

- In 1972, he was awarded the Horatio Alger Award, given to dedicated community leaders who demonstrate individual initiative and a commitment to excellence; as exemplified by remarkable achievements accomplished through honesty, hard work, self-reliance and perseverance over adversity. The Horatio Alger Association of Distinguished Americans, Inc. bears the name of the renowned author Horatio Alger, Jr., whose tales of overcoming adversity through unyielding perseverance and basic moral principles captivated the public in the late 19th century.
- In 1977, Doolittle received the Golden Plate Award of the American Academy of Achievement.
- On December 11, 1981, Doolittle was awarded Honorary Naval Aviator wings in recognition of his many years of support of military aviation by Chief of Naval Operations Admiral Thomas B. Hayward.
- In 1983, Doolittle was awarded the Sylvanus Thayer Award.

Honors

- The city of Doolittle, Missouri, located 5 miles west of Rolla was named in his honor after World War II.
- Doolittle was invested into the Sovereign Order of Cyprus and his medallion is now on display at the Smithsonian National Air and Space Museum.
- His Bolivian Order of the Condor of the Andes is in the collection of the Smithsonian National Air and Space Museum.
- In 1967, James H. Doolittle was inducted into the National Aviation Hall of Fame.
- The Society of Experimental Test Pilots annually presents the James H. Doolittle Award in his memory. The award is for "outstanding accomplishment in technical management or engineering achievement in aerospace technology".
- Doolittle was inducted into the International Air & Space Hall of Fame at the San Diego Air & Space Museum in 1966.
- The oldest residence hall on Embry-Riddle Aeronautical University's campus, Doolittle Hall (1968), was named in his honor.
- He was inducted into the Motorsports Hall of Fame of America in 1989.
- Air & Space/Smithsonian ranked him the greatest aviator in history.
- Flying magazine ranked him 6th on its list of the 51 Heroes of Aviation.
- Doolittle Drive (California State Route 61) runs along the east side of the Oakland Airport (OAK) in Oakland, California. It parallels Earhart Road (another aviation-themed name), then heads toward Hayward, California.
- A television special, All-Star Tribute to General Jimmy Doolittle, aired in 1986 to honor his 90th birthday. Celebrity appearances included Bob Hope, Gerald Ford, and Ronald Reagan.
- General Doolittle was named as the inaugural class exemplar at the United States Air Force Academy for the Class of 2000.

=== Namesakes ===
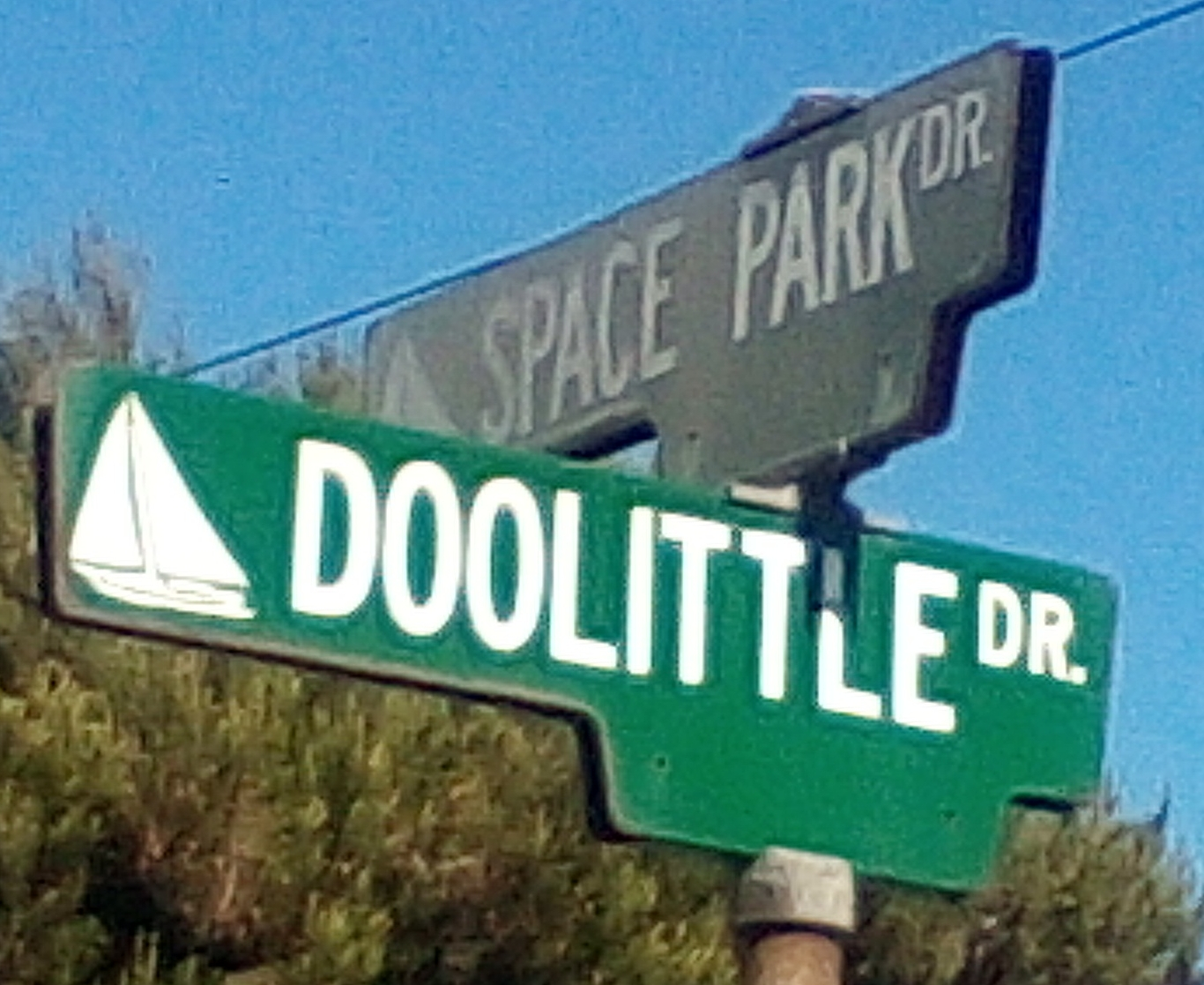
Street named after Jimmy Doolittle at TRW's Space Park in Redondo Beach, California where he served on the board of directors during the 1960s.

Many US Air Force bases have facilities and streets named for Doolittle, such as the Jimmy Doolittle Event Center at Minot Air Force Base and the Doolittle Lounge at Goodfellow Air Force Base.

The headquarters of the United States Air Force Academy Association of Graduates (AOG) on the grounds of the United States Air Force Academy is named Doolittle Hall.

Achievement 6 of the United States Air Force Auxiliary, also known as Civil Air Patrol, is named the Doolittle Award.

== In popular culture ==
- Spencer Tracy played Doolittle in Mervyn LeRoy's 1944 film Thirty Seconds Over Tokyo.
- Alec Baldwin played Doolittle in Michael Bay's 2001 film Pearl Harbor.
- Vincent Riotta played Jimmy Doolittle in Bille August's 2017 film The Chinese Widow aka The Hidden Soldier.
- Aaron Eckhart played Doolittle in Roland Emmerich's 2019 film Midway.
- Bob Clampett's 1946 cartoon Baby Bottleneck briefly portrays a dog named "Jimmy Do-quite-a-little", who invents a failed rocket ship.
- Spike Jones' wartime song "Casey Jones" commemorates the raid.

== See also ==
- Aviation history
- List of firsts in aviation
- List of Medal of Honor recipients for World War II

== Sources ==
- Hoppes, Jonna Doolittle (2005). Calculated Risk. Santa Monica Press. ISBN 1-891661-44-2.
- Scott, James M. (2015). "The Untold Story of the Vengeful Japanese Attack After the Doolittle Raid". Smithsonian. Archived from the original on March 22, 2021.
- SSG Cornelius Seon (Retired) (adapted public domain text). "United States Air Force". Archived from the original on April 29, 2009.
- Wolk, Herman S. (2003). Fulcrum of Power: Essays on the United States Air Force and National Security (PDF). Washington, D.C.: Air Force History and Museums Program. Archived from the original (PDF) on November 27, 2011.
- Yamamoto, Masahiro (2000). Nanking: Anatomy of an Atrocity. Westport, Connecticut: Praeger. ISBN 978-0275969042.
