= Jonna Doolittle Hoppes =

American author

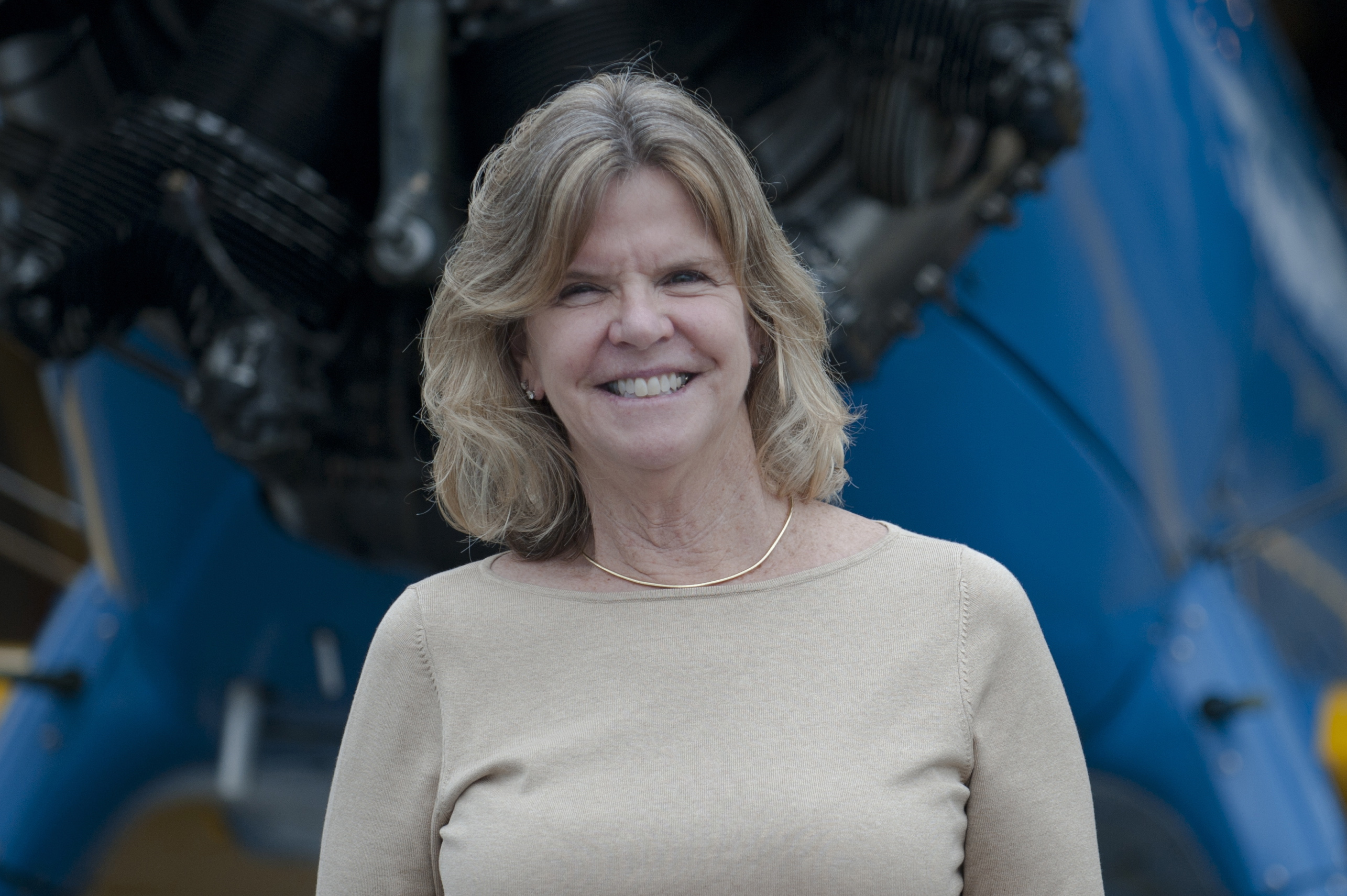
- Jonna Doolittle Hoppes by a PT-17 Stearman in 2011
- Born: Jonna Doolittle
- Occupations: Author, Educator
- Relatives: Jimmy Doolittle (Grandfather)
- Website: jonnadoolittlehoppes.com

Jonna Doolittle Hoppes (born Jonna Doolittle) is an American author whose works include oral histories and biographies. The granddaughter of aviation pioneer and United States Air Force General, Jimmy Doolittle, she is a speaker and represents the Doolittle family at events throughout the world. Hoppes' works celebrate the veterans and civilians who defended their countries and document their stories that would otherwise be lost.

== Early life ==
Hoppes was born the second of John and Priscilla Doolittle's five children. Her father, one of James H. Doolittle's two sons, is a retired USAF colonel who flew combat missions in both the Korean War and Vietnam War. Her siblings include older sister, Jody, younger sister, Penny, and twin brothers, Peter and Patrick.

I grew up with 79 uncles in addition to the ones I really had.

— Jonna Doolittle Hoppes referring to the Doolittle Raiders

During her childhood, she spent many hours with her grandparents, whom she called Granny and Gramps, when they lived in San Francisco and later in Los Angeles, California. The Doolittle Raiders, who flew with her grandfather on the 1942 mission to bomb Tokyo, were part of her extended family and she would sometimes attend their yearly reunions. Raiders, such as historian Colonel Carroll. V. Glines, became important figures in Hoppes' life. Glines would later write the foreword to her book, Calculated Risk.

== Career ==
=== Educator and author ===
Hoppes works at the 61st Mission Support Squadron's Educational Office – a unit of the 61st Air Base Group stationed at the Los Angeles Air Force Base. She started her first book in response to the film, Pearl Harbor, to correct inaccuracies about her grandfather's character and actions during World War II. Actor Alec Baldwin initially portrayed Doolittle as an ill-tempered man prone to using profanity, but the depiction was corrected after Hoppes presented the family's objections. Although Calculated Risk presented the achievements of Jimmy Doolittle, the book also included many details about the family such as Doolittle's wife of 71 years, Josephine Daniels. One reviewer described the book as "an ode to her grandmother," whom Hoppes herself described as a woman with the patience of a saint who was the rudder of Doolittle's life. Calculated Risk received positive reviews from a number of trade publications including Library Journal, Publishers Weekly, and Booklist.

Hoppes' second book, Just Doing My Job, is a collection of stories about the military service of the Greatest Generation. A review by Publishers Weekly found a story about Japanese-American soldier, Dick Hamada, who worked for the Office of Strategic Services intelligence agency "particularly fascinating." Hoppes called for veterans of all conflicts to record their stories using programs such as the Veterans History Project. We Represented All Women, Hoppes' account of Violet "Vi" Cowden of the Women Airforce Service Pilots (WASPs), appeared on the Air & Space/Smithsonian website in June 2009.

Hoppes is working on a third book that will include interviews with other World War II veterans including Major General Johnny Alison. As of 2013, Hoppes serves on the board of directors for the Warhawk Air Museum in Nampa, Idaho, and the Air Force Historical Foundation.

=== Television ===
In 2007, Hoppes appeared in From Vengeance to Forgiveness, the story of Corporal Jake DeShazer, a Doolittle Raider who was captured by the Japanese. Although he suffered years of abuse at the hands of his captors, DeShazer later forgave his enemies and returned to Japan as a missionary. In 2008, Hoppes appeared on The History Channel's Man, Moment, Machine series that described historical events in the context of the key person involved, the machine used by that person, and the outcome of the moment. In the episode Doolittle's Daring Raid, Hoppes described her grandfather's childhood and love of flying. She also described the despair her grandfather felt when he thought the raid on Japan had failed.

=== Presentations ===
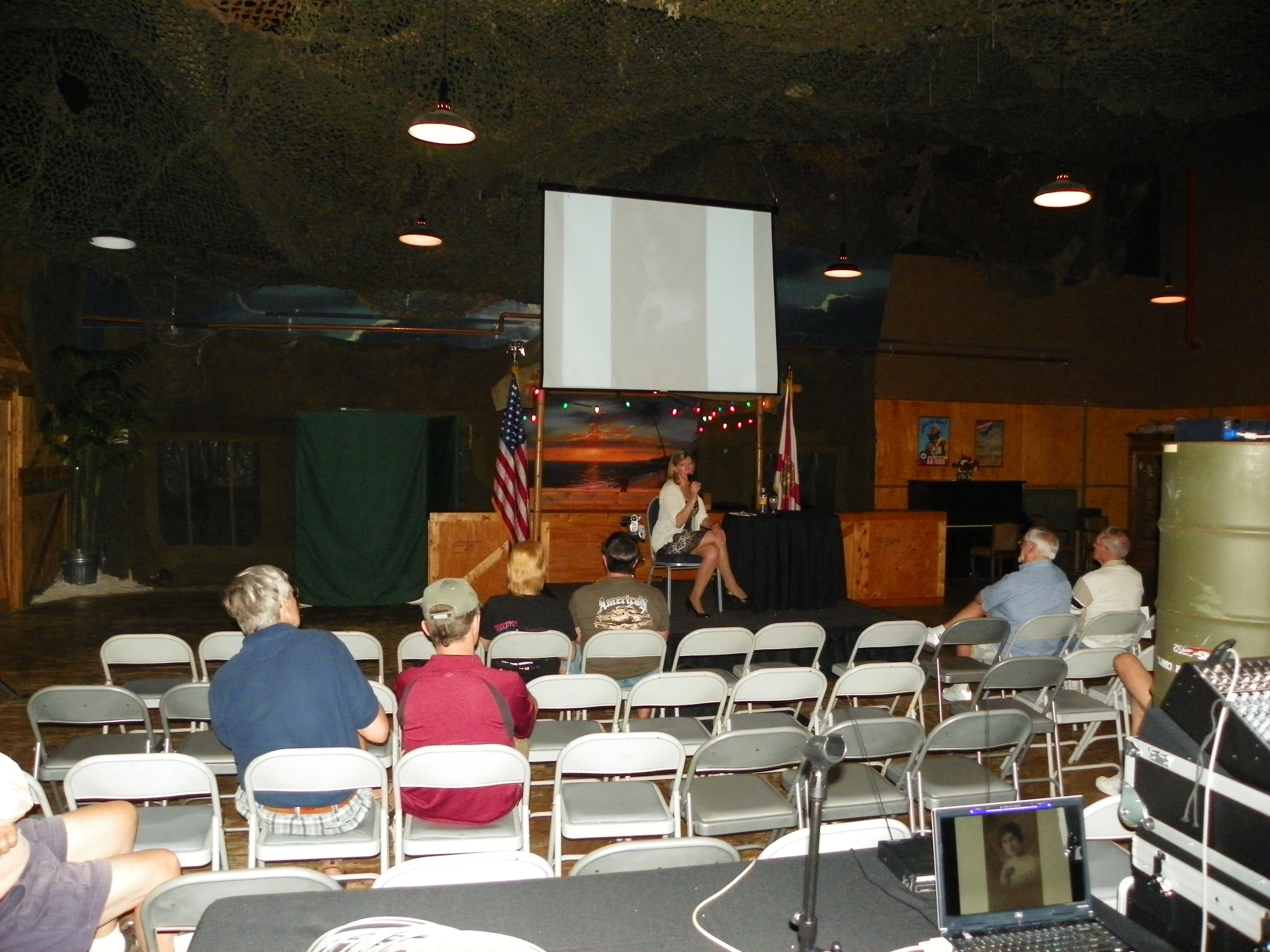
Hoppes speaking at the Fantasy of Flight's Officer's Club in 2011

Hoppes began giving presentations to ensure the memory of her grandfather was accurately portrayed. She has since presented many lectures at events throughout the United States and Europe:

- Growing up with General James Doolittle—A General Electric Aviation series lecture held on April 6, 2006 at the National Air and Space Museum in Washington D.C.
- Doolittle Returns to Bassingbourn—A photographic remembrance of Jimmy Doolittle held on May 23, 2009 at the Tower Museum at RAF Bassingbourn, England. The noted B-17, Memphis Belle, operated from this base during World War II.
- Global Warfare Symposium—An Air Force Association symposium focused on integrating space and cyberspace across warfighting domains held on November 19–20, 2009 at the Beverly Hilton Hotel in Beverly Hills, California.
- 70th Anniversary of the Tokyo attack—A news conference held on May 5, 2012 at the USS Hornet Museum in Alameda, California with Doolittle Raiders Staff Sergeant David J. Thatcher, Major Thomas C. Griffin, and Major Edward J. Saylor.
- Wings of Valor Gala—Keynote speaker at a fundraiser held on October 13, 2012 at Van Nuys Airport benefiting the Jimmy Doolittle Air & Space Museum.

== Personal life ==
As of 2011, Hoppes lives in Newport Beach, California. She has two adult daughters, Stacy and Shawna.

== List of works ==
- Calculated Risk: The Extraordinary Life of Jimmy Doolittle. Santa Monica Press, 2005. ISBN 1-891661-44-2.
- Just Doing My Job: Stories of Service from World War II. Santa Monica Press. 2009. ISBN 1-595800-42-5.

== Honors ==
On January 14, 2010, Hoppes received the "Content of their Character" award at the Martin Luther King Jr. luncheon celebration held in Los Angeles, California.

== General sources ==
- Barnes, Terri (February 4, 2007). "Aviator Jimmy Doolittle's granddaughter shares home tales of a WWII hero". Stars and Stripes. Washington, D.C. Archived from the original on 2016-04-22.
- Cameron, Esther; Green, Mike (2012). Making Sense of Change Management: A Complete Guide to the Models, Tools and Techniques of Organizational Change (3rd ed.). Philadelphia, Pennsylvania: Kogan Page. ISBN 978-0-749-46435-6.
- Day of Discovery (2007). From Vengeance to Forgiveness: Jake DeShazer's Extraordinary Journey (DVD). Grand Rapids, Michigan: Discovery House Publishers. ASIN B001700732.
- Doolittle, James H.; Glines, Carroll V. (1991). I Could Never Be So Lucky Again. New York: Bantam Books. ISBN 0-553-07807-0.
- The History Channel (2008). Man, Moment, Machine: Doolittle's Daring Raid (DVD). New York: A&E Television Networks. ASIN B001CUB8GC.
- Hoppes, Jonna Doolittle (2005). Calculated Risk: The Extraordinary Life of Jimmy Doolittle. Santa Monica, California: Santa Monica Press. ISBN 1-891661-44-2.
- Hoppes, Jonna Doolittle (2009). Just Doing My Job: Stories of Service from World War II. Santa Monica, California: Santa Monica Press. ISBN 978-1-595800-42-8.
- Rife, Susan L. (July 20, 2006). "My grandfather THE GENERAL". Herald Tribune. Sarasota, Florida. Archived from the original on June 4, 2016.
- Wilson, Captain Dave (February 5, 2010). "MLK Luncheon Celebrates Dr. King's Dream" (PDF). Aerotech News and Review. 3 (7). Archived from the original (PDF) on January 29, 2010. Alt URL
