= Jonna Dwinger =

Jonna Dwinger (died 24 December, 2012) was a Danish journalist and food critic.

== Biography ==
Dwinger started working as a journalist at the newspaper Politiken in 1946, and worked there for more than 50 years. In the 1950s she was the correspondent for the newspaper's London office.

In 1978, she published a book of recipes, Vores sommerkøkken (My Summer Kitchen).

== Publications ==
- Dwinger, J. (1978). Vores sommerkøkken.
