= Charles Lindbergh =

American aviator and eugenicist (1902–1974)

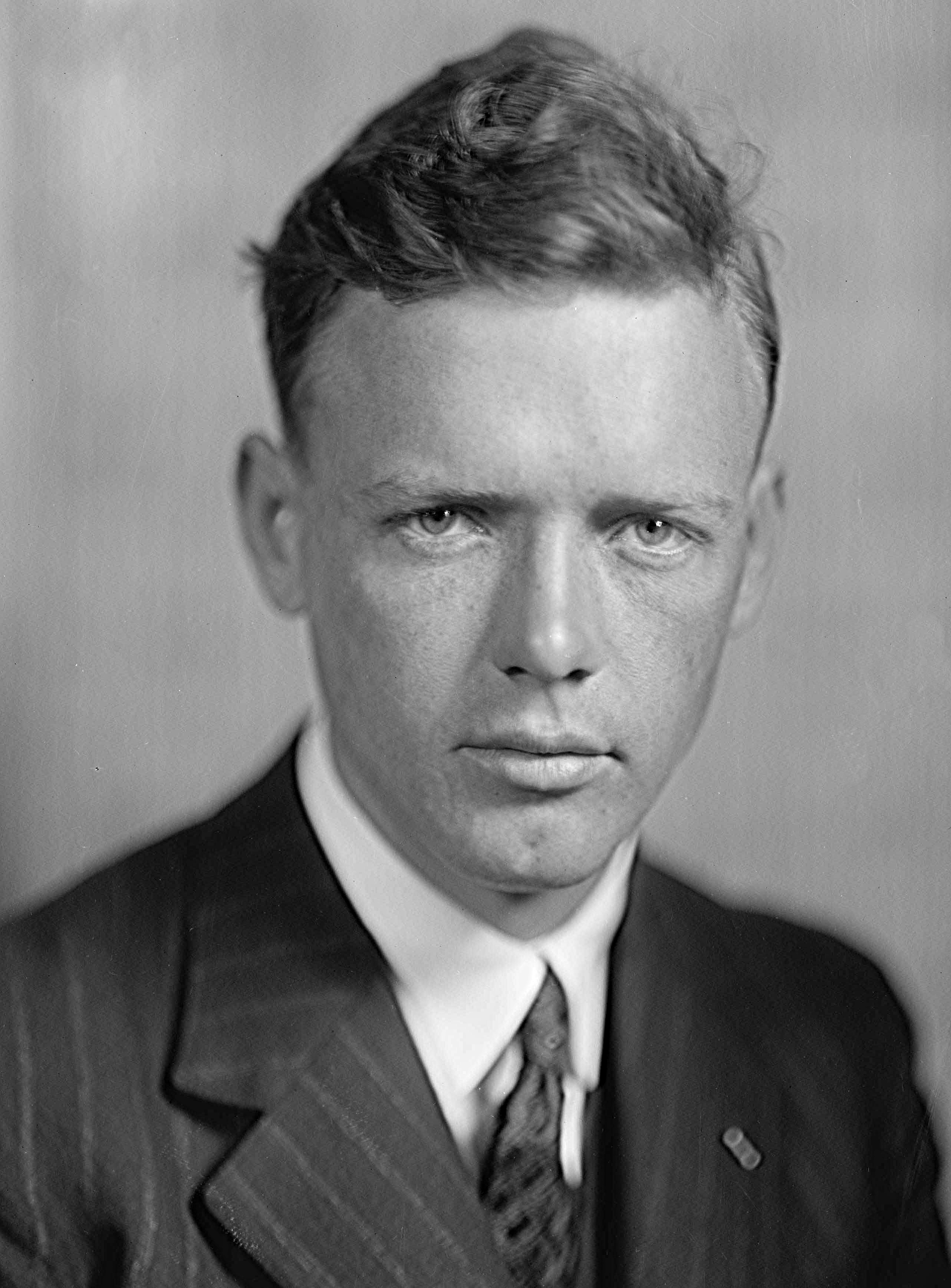
- Portrait c. 1927
- Born: February 4, 1902; Detroit, Michigan, U.S.
- Died: August 26, 1974 (aged 72); Kipahulu, Hawaii, U.S.
- Burial place: Palapala Ho'omau Church, Kipahulu
- Other names: Lucky Lindy; Lone Eagle; Slim
- Education: University of Wisconsin–Madison (no degree)
- Occupations: Aviator; author; inventor; explorer; activist
- Known for: First solo transatlantic flight (1927), pioneer of international commercial aviation and air mail
- Spouse: Anne Morrow (m. 1929)
- Children: 13, (Note: Lindbergh fathered six children with long-time wife Anne Morrow, the first-born of which, Charles Jr., was kidnapped and murdered in his infancy; and seven other children with three separate European women out of wedlock.) including Charles Jr., Jon, Anne, and Reeve
- Parents: Evangeline Lodge Land; Charles August Lindbergh
- Military career
- Allegiance: United States
- Branch: United States Army Air Service; United States Army Air Corps; United States Air Force
- Service years: 1924–1941, 1954–1974
- Rank: Colonel; Brigadier general (promoted 1954)
- Conflicts: World War II
- Awards: Medal of Honor; Distinguished Flying Cross; Légion d'honneur; Congressional Gold Medal; Pulitzer Prize for Biography

Charles Augustus Lindbergh (February 4, 1902 – August 26, 1974) was an American aviator, military officer, and author. On May 20–21, 1927, he made the first nonstop flight from New York to Paris, a distance of 3,600 miles (5,800 km), flying alone for over 33 hours. His aircraft, the Spirit of St. Louis, was built to compete for the $25,000 Orteig Prize for the first flight between the two cities. Although not the first transatlantic flight, it was the first solo crossing of the Atlantic and the longest at the time by nearly 2,000 miles (3,200 km), setting a new flight distance world record. The achievement garnered Lindbergh worldwide fame and stands as one of the most consequential flights in history, signalling a new era of international air transportation.

Lindbergh was the son of U.S. congressman Charles August Lindbergh. He became a U.S. Army Air Service cadet in 1924. The next year, he was hired as a U.S. Air Mail pilot in the Greater St. Louis area, where he began to prepare for crossing the Atlantic. For his 1927 flight, President Calvin Coolidge presented him both the Distinguished Flying Cross and Medal of Honor, the highest U.S. military award. He was promoted to colonel in the U.S. Army Air Corps Reserve and also earned the highest French order of merit, the Legion of Honor. His achievement spurred significant global interest in flight training, commercial aviation, and air mail, which revolutionized the aviation industry worldwide (a phenomenon dubbed the "Lindbergh Boom"), and he spent much time promoting these industries.

Time magazine named Lindbergh its first Man of the Year for 1927, President Herbert Hoover appointed him to the National Advisory Committee for Aeronautics in 1929, and he received the Congressional Gold Medal in 1930. In 1931, he and French surgeon Alexis Carrel began work on inventing the first perfusion pump, a device credited with making future heart surgeries and organ transplantation possible. However, despite initially being a subject of media prominence, Lindbergh and Carrel's version of the perfusion pump was considered to be impractical and difficult to use, and would lose influence by the 1940s.

On March 1, 1932, Lindbergh's infant child, Charles Jr., was kidnapped and murdered in what the American media called the "crime of the century". The case prompted the U.S. to establish kidnapping as a federal crime if a kidnapper crosses state lines with a victim. By late 1935, public hysteria from the case drove the Lindbergh family abroad to Europe, from where they returned in 1939. In the months before the United States entered World War II, Lindbergh's non-interventionist stance and statements about Jews and race led many to believe he was a Nazi sympathizer. Lindbergh never publicly stated support for the Nazis and condemned them several times in both his public speeches and personal diary, but associated with them on numerous occasions in the 1930s. He also supported the isolationist America First Committee and resigned from the U.S. Army Air Corps in April 1941 after President Franklin Roosevelt publicly rebuked him for his views. In September 1941, Lindbergh gave a significant address, titled "Speech on Neutrality", outlining his position and arguments against greater American involvement in the war.

Following the Japanese attack on Pearl Harbor and German declaration of war against the U.S., Lindbergh avidly supported the American war effort but was rejected for active duty, as Roosevelt refused to restore his colonel's commission. Instead he flew 50 combat missions in the Pacific Theater as a civilian consultant and was unofficially credited with shooting down an enemy aircraft. In 1954, President Dwight Eisenhower restored his commission and promoted him to brigadier general in the U.S. Air Force Reserve. In his later years, he became a Pulitzer Prize-winning author, international explorer, and environmentalist, helping to establish national parks in the U.S. and protect certain endangered species and tribal people in both the Philippines and east Africa. After retiring in Maui, Lindbergh died of lymphoma in 1974 at the age of 72.

== Early life ==
=== Early childhood ===
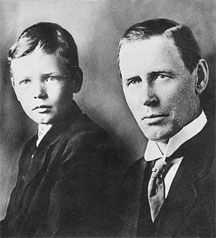
Lindbergh and his father, c. 1910

Lindbergh was born in Detroit, Michigan, on February 4, 1902, and spent most of his childhood in Little Falls, Minnesota, and Washington, D.C. He was the only child of Charles August Lindbergh (birth name Carl Månsson), who had emigrated from Sweden to Melrose, Minnesota, as an infant, and Evangeline Lodge Land Lindbergh of Detroit. Lindbergh had three elder paternal half-sisters: Lillian, Edith, and Eva. The couple separated in 1909 when Lindbergh was seven years old.

Lindbergh's father, a U.S. congressman from 1907 to 1917, was one of the few congressmen to oppose the entry of the U.S. into World War I (although his congressional term ended one month before the House of Representatives voted to declare war on Germany). Lindbergh's mother was a chemistry teacher at Cass Technical High School in Detroit and later at Little Falls High School, from which her son graduated on June 5, 1918. Lindbergh attended more than a dozen other schools from Washington, D.C., to California during his childhood and teenage years (none for more than two years), including the Force School and Sidwell Friends School while living in Washington with his father, and Redondo Union High School in Redondo Beach, California, while living there with his mother. Although Lindbergh enrolled in the College of Engineering at the University of Wisconsin–Madison in late 1920, he dropped out in the middle of his sophomore year.

=== Early aviation career ===
From an early age, Lindbergh had exhibited an interest in the mechanics of motorized transportation, including his family's Saxon Six automobile, and later his Excelsior motorbike. By the time Lindbergh started college as a mechanical engineering student, he had also become fascinated with flying, though he "had never been close enough to a plane to touch it". After quitting college in February 1922, Lindbergh enrolled at the Nebraska Aircraft Corporation's flying school in Lincoln and flew for the first time on April 9 as a passenger in a two-seat Lincoln Standard "Tourabout" biplane trainer piloted by Otto Timm.

A few days later, Lindbergh took his first formal flying lesson in that same aircraft, though he was never permitted to solo because he could not afford to post the requisite damage bond. To gain flight experience and earn money for further instruction, Lindbergh left Lincoln in June to spend the next few months barnstorming across Nebraska, Kansas, Colorado, Wyoming, and Montana as a wing walker and parachutist. He also briefly worked as an airplane mechanic at the Billings, Montana, municipal airport.

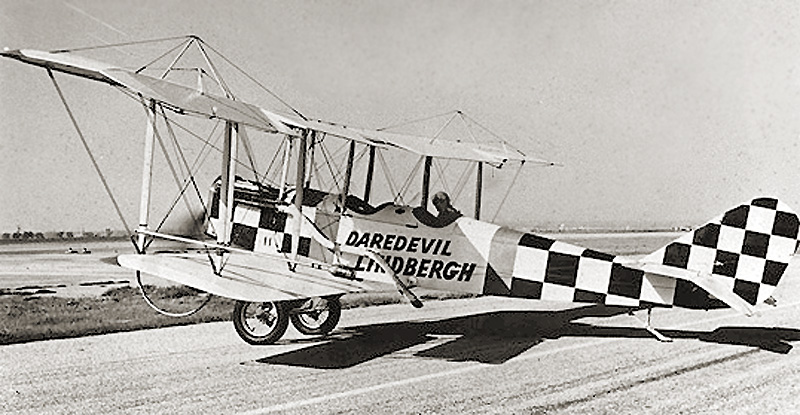
"Daredevil Lindbergh" in a re-engined Standard J-1, c. 1925. The plane in this photo is often misidentified as a Curtiss "Jenny".

Lindbergh left flying with the onset of winter and returned to his father's home in Minnesota. His return to the air and his first solo flight did not come until half a year later in May 1923 at Souther Field in Americus, Georgia, a former Army flight-training field, where he bought a World War I surplus Curtiss JN-4 "Jenny" biplane for $500. Although Lindbergh had not touched an airplane in more than six months, he had already secretly decided that he was ready to take to the air by himself. After a half-hour of dual time with a pilot who was visiting the field, Lindbergh flew solo for the first time in the Jenny. After spending another week or so at the field to "practice" (thereby acquiring five hours of "pilot in command" time), Lindbergh took off from Americus for Montgomery, Alabama, some 140 miles (230 km) to the west, for his first solo cross-country flight. Lindbergh went on to spend much of the remainder of 1923 engaged in almost nonstop barnstorming under the name "Daredevil Lindbergh", this time flying in his "own ship" as the pilot. A few weeks after leaving Americus, he made his first night flight near Lake Village, Arkansas.

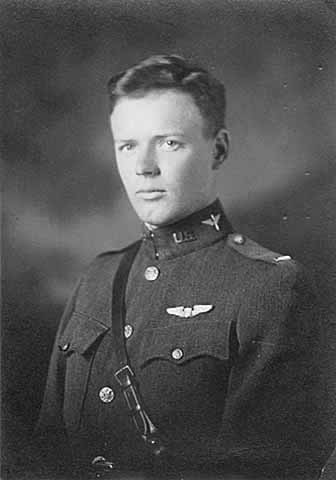
Lindbergh as a young 2nd Lt., March 1925

While Lindbergh was barnstorming in Lone Rock, Wisconsin, on two occasions he flew a local physician across the Wisconsin River to emergency calls that were otherwise unreachable because of flooding. Lindbergh broke his propeller several times while landing, and on June 3, 1923, he was grounded for a week when he ran into a ditch in Glencoe, Minnesota, while flying his father—then running for the U.S. Senate—to a campaign stop. In October, Lindbergh flew his Jenny to Iowa, where he sold it to a flying student. Lindbergh returned to Lincoln by train, where he joined Leon Klink and continued to barnstorm through the South for the next few months in Klink's Curtiss JN-4C "Canuck" (the Canadian version of the Jenny). Lindbergh also "cracked up" this aircraft once when his engine failed shortly after takeoff in Pensacola, Florida, but again Lindbergh managed to repair the damage himself.

Following a few months of barnstorming through the South, the two pilots parted company in San Antonio, Texas, where Lindbergh reported to Brooks Field on March 19, 1924, to begin a year of military flight training with the United States Army Air Service there (and later at nearby Kelly Field). Lindbergh had his most serious flying accident on March 5, 1925, eight days before graduation, when a mid-air collision with another Army S.E.5 during aerial combat maneuvers forced him to bail out. Only 18 of the 104 cadets who started flight training a year earlier remained when Lindbergh graduated first overall in his class in March 1925, thereby earning his Army pilot's wings and a commission as a second lieutenant in the Air Service Reserve Corps. (Note: Dates of military rank: Cadet, Army Air Corps – March 19, 1924, 2nd Lieutenant, Officer Reserve Corps (ORC) – March 14, 1925, 1st Lieutenant, ORC – December 7, 1925, Captain, ORC – July 13, 1926, Colonel, ORC – July 18, 1927 (As of 1927, Lindbergh was a member of the Missouri National Guard and was assigned to the 110th Observation Squadron in St. Louis.), Brigadier General, USAFR – April 7, 1954.)

Lindbergh later said that this year was critical to his development as both a focused, goal-oriented individual and as an aviator. (Note: "Always there was some new experience, always something interesting going on to make the time spent at Brooks and Kelly one of the banner years in a pilot's life. The training is difficult and rigid, but there is none better. A cadet must be willing to forget all other interest in life when he enters the Texas flying schools and he must enter with the intention of devoting every effort and all of the energy during the next 12 months towards a single goal. But when he receives the wings at Kelly a year later, he has the satisfaction of knowing that he has graduated from one of the world's finest flying schools." "WE" p. 125) However, the Army did not need additional active-duty pilots, so following graduation, Lindbergh returned to civilian aviation as a barnstormer and flight instructor, although as a reserve officer, he also continued to do some part-time military flying by joining the 110th Observation Squadron, 35th Division, Missouri National Guard, in St. Louis. Lindbergh was promoted to first lieutenant on December 7, 1925, and to captain in July 1926.

=== Air mail pilot ===
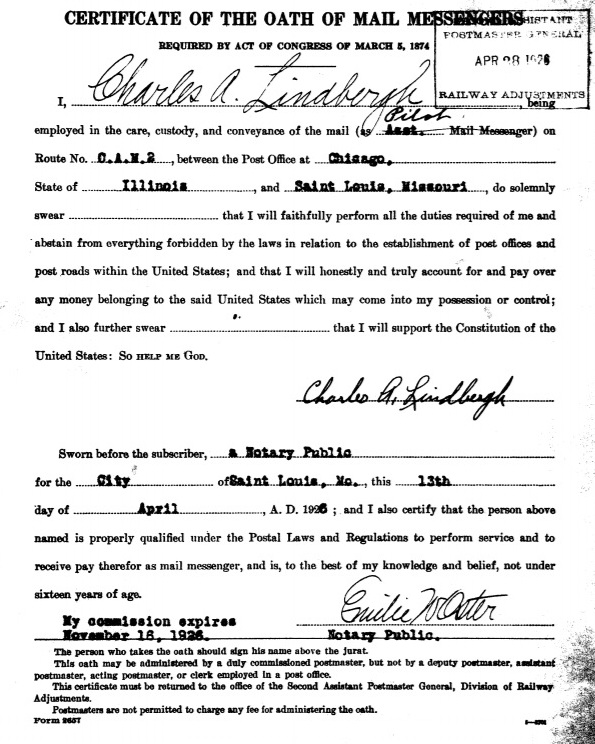
"Certificate of the Oath of Mail Messengers", executed by Lindbergh

In October 1925, Lindbergh was hired by the Robertson Aircraft Corporation (RAC) at the Lambert-St. Louis Flying Field in Anglum, Missouri, (where he had been working as a flight instructor) to lay out and then serve as chief pilot for the newly designated 278-mile (447 km) Contract Air Mail Route #2 (CAM-2) to provide service between St. Louis and Chicago with intermediate stops in Springfield and Peoria, Illinois. Lindbergh and three other RAC pilots flew the mail over CAM-2 in a fleet of four modified war-surplus de Havilland DH-4s.

On April 13, 1926, Lindbergh swore the United States Post Office Department's Oath of Mail Messengers, and two days later, he opened service on the new route. On two occasions, combinations of bad weather, equipment failure, and fuel exhaustion forced Lindbergh to bail out on night approach to Chicago; both times he reached the ground without serious injury. In mid-February 1927, Lindbergh left for San Diego, California, to oversee design and construction of the Spirit of St. Louis.

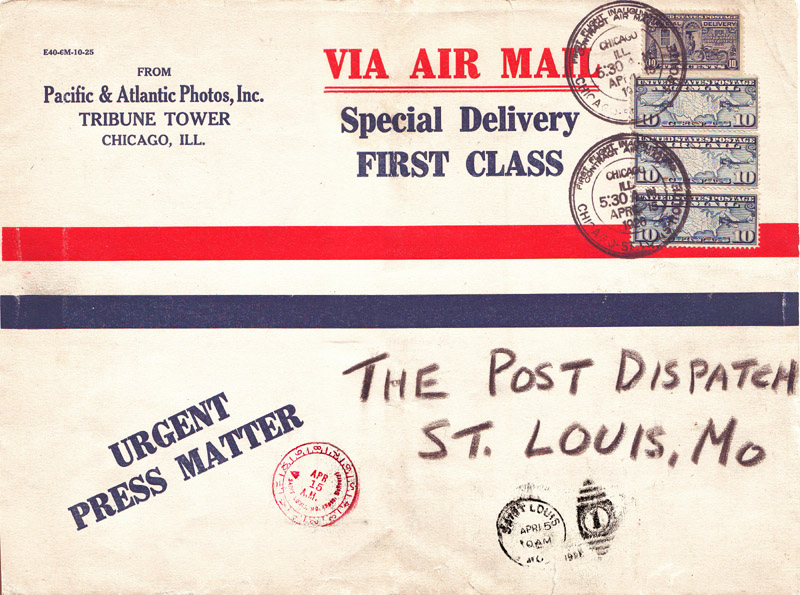
CAM-2 first flight cover

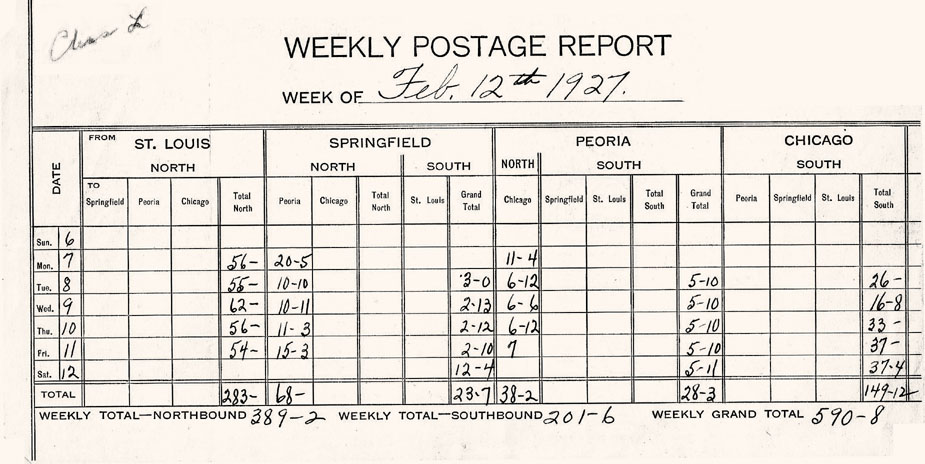
A CAM-2 "Weekly Postage Report" by Lindbergh

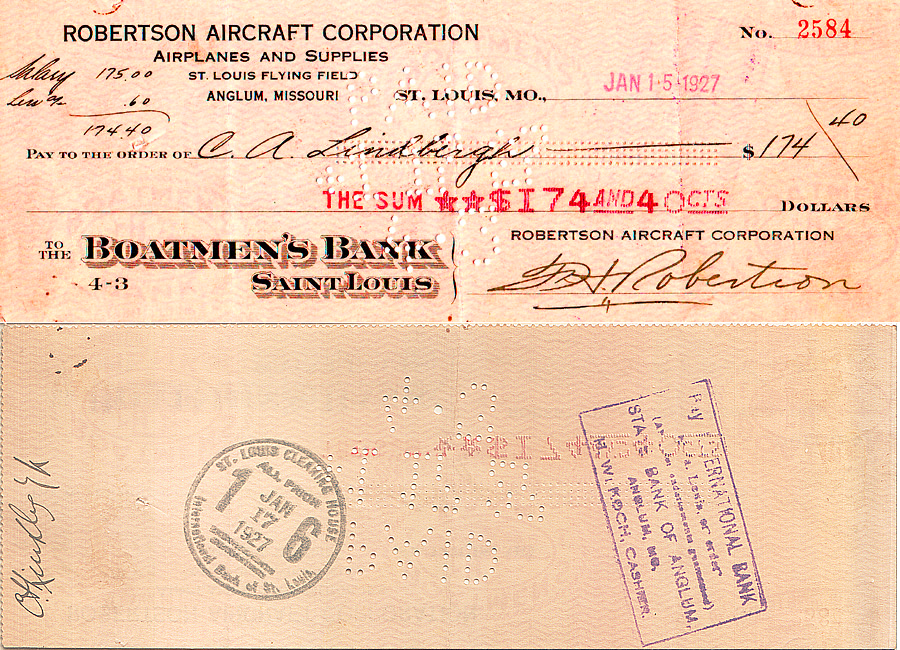
One of Lindbergh's Air Mail paychecks

== New York–Paris flight ==
=== Orteig Prize ===
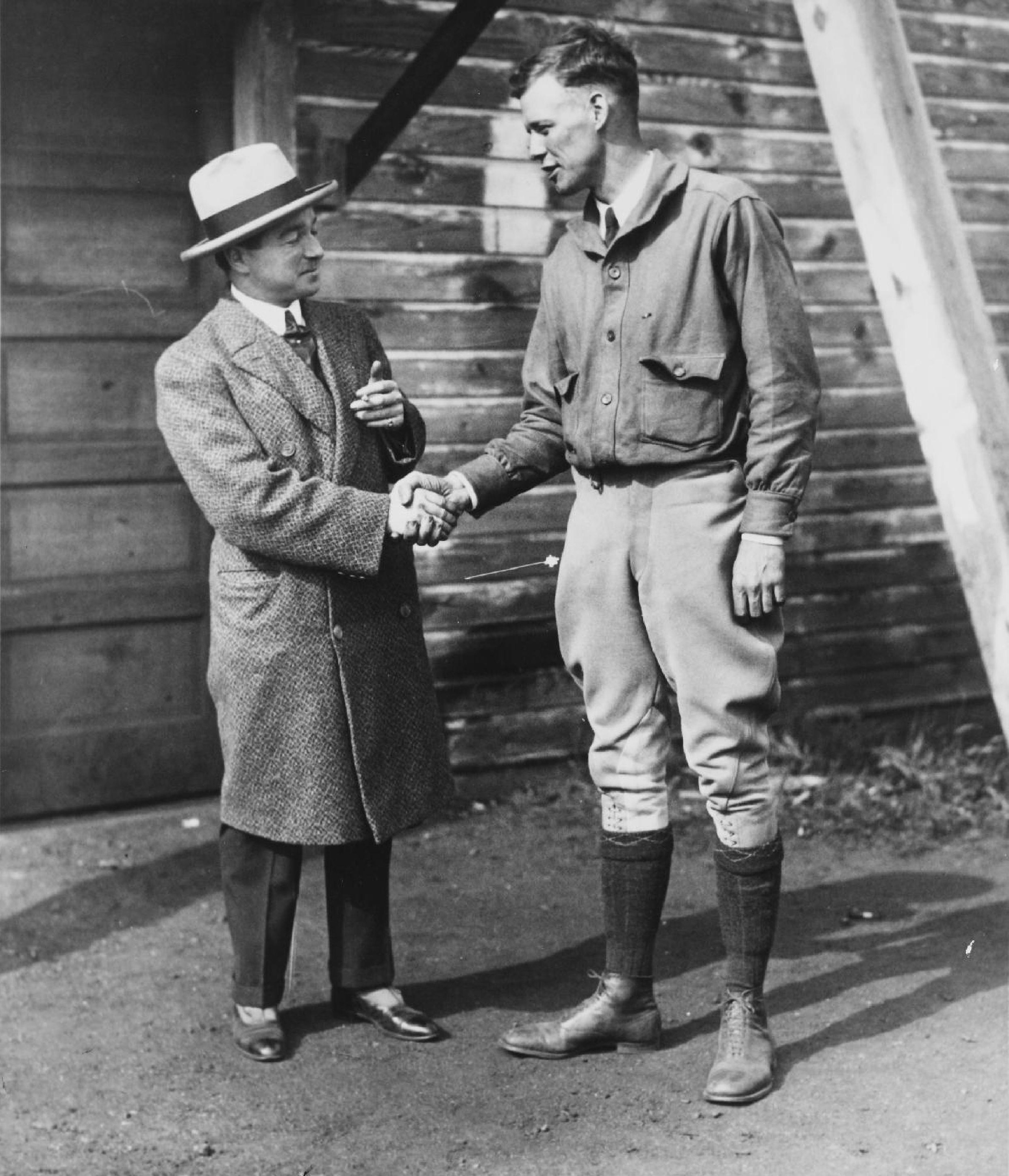
René Fonck with Lindbergh in 1927. Fonck's failed 1926 attempt at the Orteig Prize directly inspired Lindbergh

In 1919, British aviators John Alcock and Arthur Brown won the Daily Mail prize for the first nonstop transatlantic flight. They left St. John's, Newfoundland, on June 14, 1919, and arrived in Clifden, County Galway, Ireland the following day.

Around the same time, French-born New York hotelier Raymond Orteig was approached by Augustus Post, secretary of the Aero Club of America, to put up a $25,000 (equivalent to $464,000 in 2025) award for the first successful nonstop transatlantic flight specifically between New York City and Paris within five years after its establishment. When that time limit lapsed in 1924 without a serious attempt, Orteig renewed the offer for another five years, this time attracting a number of well-known, highly experienced, and well-financed contenders—none of whom were successful. On September 21, 1926, World War I French flying ace René Fonck's Sikorsky S-35 crashed on takeoff from Roosevelt Field in New York, killing crew members Jacob Islamoff and Charles Clavier. Similarly, U.S. Naval aviators Noel Davis and Stanton H. Wooster were killed at Langley Field, Virginia, on April 26, 1927, while testing their Keystone Pathfinder. On May 8, French war heroes Charles Nungesser and François Coli departed Paris–Le Bourget Airport in their Levasseur PL 8 seaplane, L'Oiseau Blanc, but were last seen flying above Carrigaholt on the western coast of Ireland, after which they disappeared and presumably died en route to America.

The specific event that inspired Lindbergh to attempt the flight was René Fonck's September 1926 failure. Reading of Fonck's crash, Lindbergh decided that "a nonstop flight between New York and Paris would be less hazardous than flying mail for a single winter." He soon "discussed his idea with St. Louis businessmen and aviation supporters" and began to gather resources, making "several inquiries" with airplane manufacturers.

=== Spirit of St. Louis ===
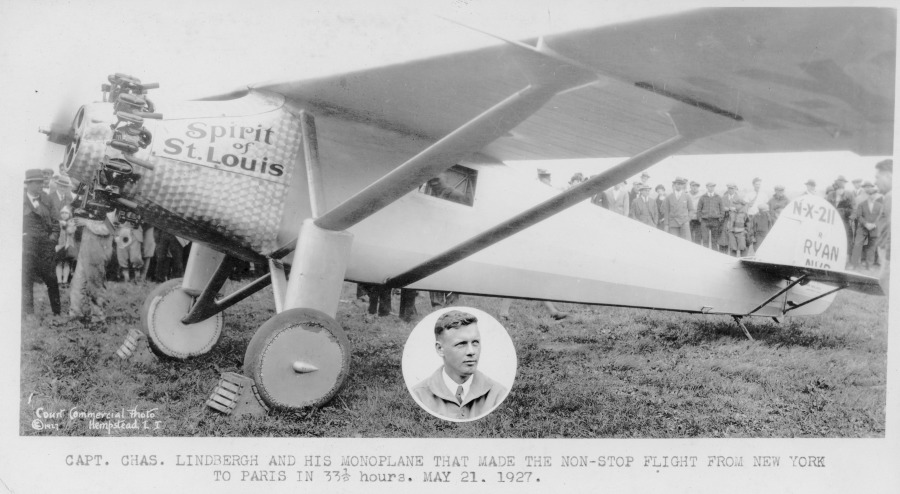
The Spirit of St. Louis

Financing the historic flight was a challenge due to Lindbergh's obscurity, but two St. Louis businessmen eventually obtained a $15,000 bank loan. Lindbergh contributed $2,000 (equivalent to $37,000 in 2025) of his own money from his salary as an air mail pilot and another $1,000 was donated by RAC. The total of $18,000 was far less than what was available to Lindbergh's rivals.

The group tried to buy an "off-the-peg" single or multiengine monoplane from Wright Aeronautical, then Travel Air, and finally the newly formed Columbia Aircraft Corporation, but all insisted on selecting the pilot as a condition of sale. Finally, the much smaller Ryan Airline Company (later called the Ryan Aeronautical Company) of San Diego agreed to design and build a custom monoplane for $10,580, and on February 25, 1927, a deal was formally closed. Dubbed the Spirit of St. Louis, the fabric-covered, single-seat, single-engine high-wing monoplane was designed jointly by Lindbergh and Ryan's chief engineer Donald A. Hall. The Spirit flew for the first time just two months later, and after a series of test flights Lindbergh took off from San Diego on May 10. Lindbergh went first to St. Louis, then on to Roosevelt Field on New York's Long Island.

=== Flight ===
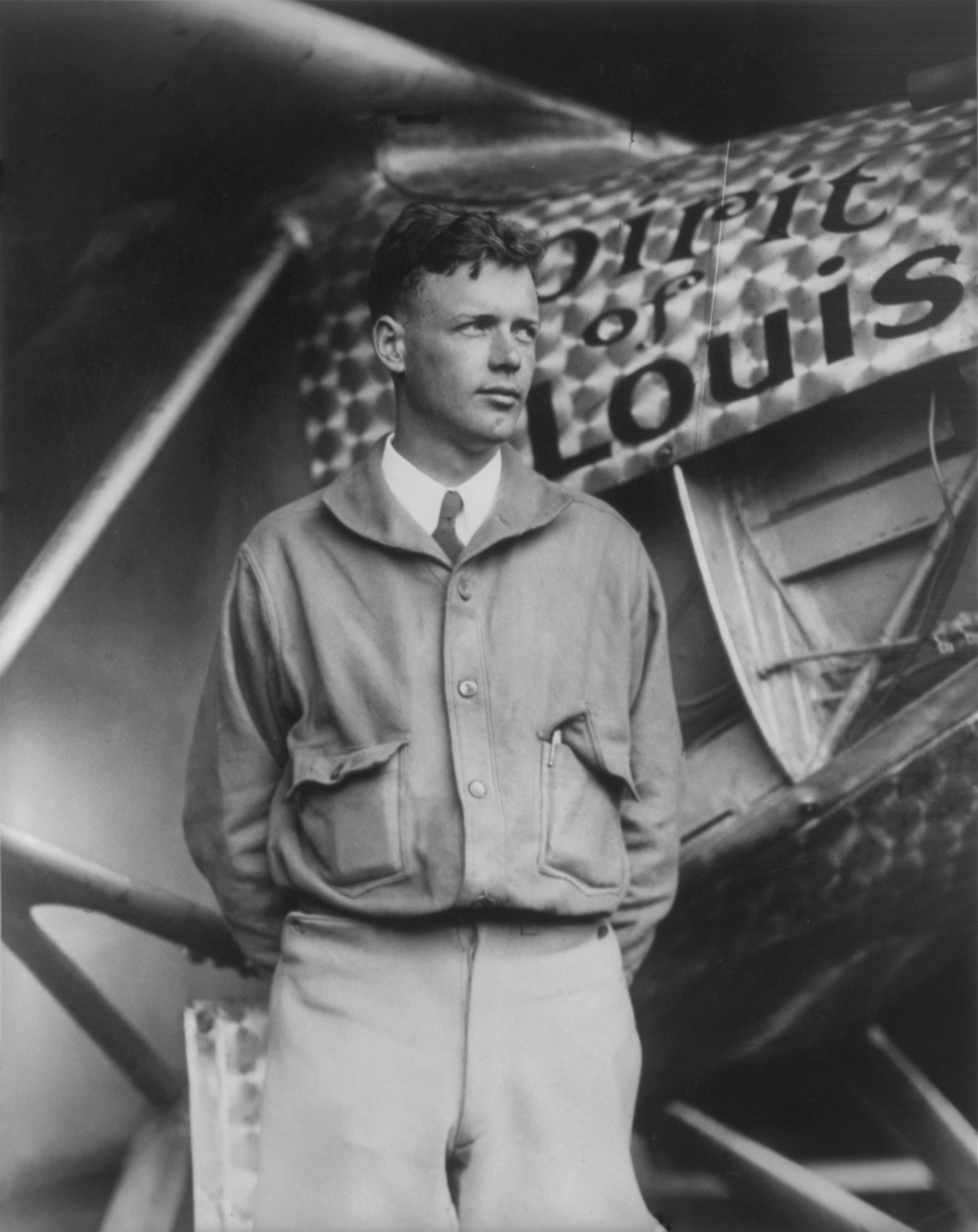
Lindbergh with the Spirit of St. Louis prior to his flight

In the early morning of Friday, May 20, 1927, Lindbergh took off from Roosevelt Field on Long Island. His destination, Le Bourget Aerodrome, was about 7 miles (11 km) outside Paris and 3,610 miles (5,810 km) from his starting point. Lindbergh was "too busy the night before to lie down for more than a couple of hours", and "had been unable [to] sleep." It rained the morning of his takeoff, but as the plane "was wheeled into position on the runway", the rain ceased and light began to break through the "low-hanging clouds." A crowd variously described as "nearly a thousand" or "several thousand" assembled to see Lindbergh off. For its transatlantic flight, the Spirit was loaded with 450 U.S. gallons (1,700 liters) of fuel that was filtered repeatedly to avoid fuel line blockage. The fuel load was a thousand pounds heavier than any the Spirit had lifted during a test flight, and the fully loaded airplane weighed 5,200 pounds (2,400 kg; 2.6 short tons). With takeoff hampered by a muddy, rain-soaked runway, the plane was "helped by men pushing at the wing struts", with the last man leaving the wings only one hundred yards (90 m) down the runway. The Spirit gained speed very slowly during its 7:52 AM takeoff, but cleared telephone lines at the far end of the field "by about twenty feet (6.1 m) with a fair reserve of flying speed".

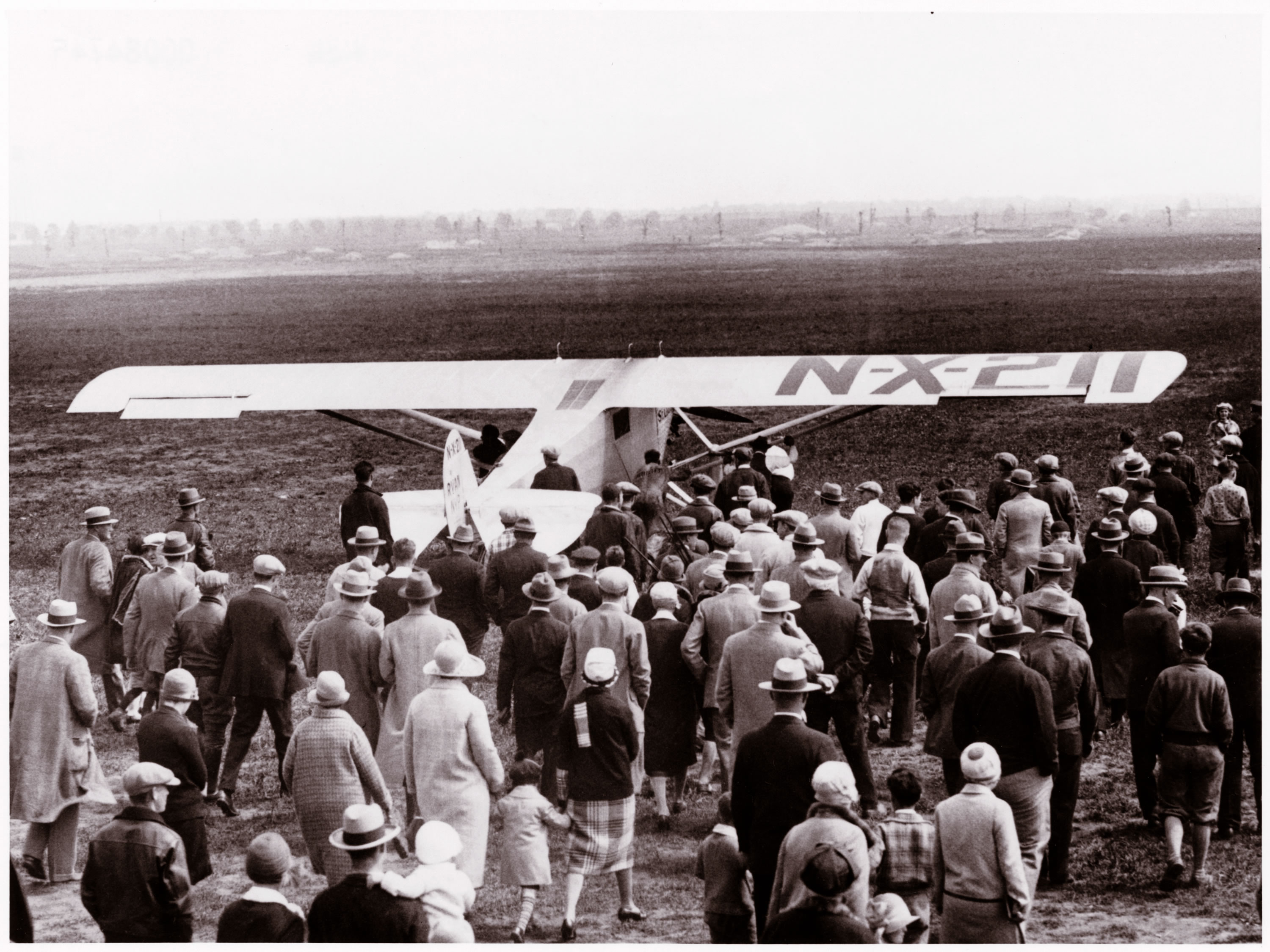
Crowd assembled at Roosevelt Field to witness Lindbergh's departure

At 8:52 AM, an hour after takeoff, Lindbergh was flying at an altitude of 500 feet (150 m) over Rhode Island, following an uneventful passage‍—‌aside from some turbulence‍—‌over Long Island Sound and Connecticut. By 9:52 AM, he had passed Boston and was flying with Cape Cod to his right, with an airspeed of 107 miles per hour (172 km/h) and altitude of 150 feet (46 m); about an hour later, Lindbergh began to feel tired, even though only a few hours had elapsed since takeoff. To keep his mind clear, Lindbergh descended and flew at only 10 feet (3 m) above the water's surface. By around 11:52 AM, he had climbed to an altitude of 200 feet (60 m), and at this point was 400 miles (640 km) distant from New York. Nova Scotia appeared ahead and, after flying over the Gulf of Maine, Lindbergh was only "6 miles (10 km), or 2 degrees, off course." At 3:52 PM, the eastern coast of Cape Breton Island was below; he struggled to stay awake, even though it was "only the afternoon of the first day." At 5:52 PM, Lindbergh was flying along the Newfoundland coast, and passed St. John's at 7:15 PM. On its May 21 front page, The New York Times ran a special cable from the prior evening: "Captain Lindbergh's airplane passed over St. John's at 8:15 o'clock tonight [7:15 New York Daylight Saving Time]...was seen by hundreds and disappeared seaward, heading for Ireland...It was flying quite low between the hills near St. John's." The Times also observed that Lindbergh was "following the track of Hawker and Greeve and also of Alcock and Brown".

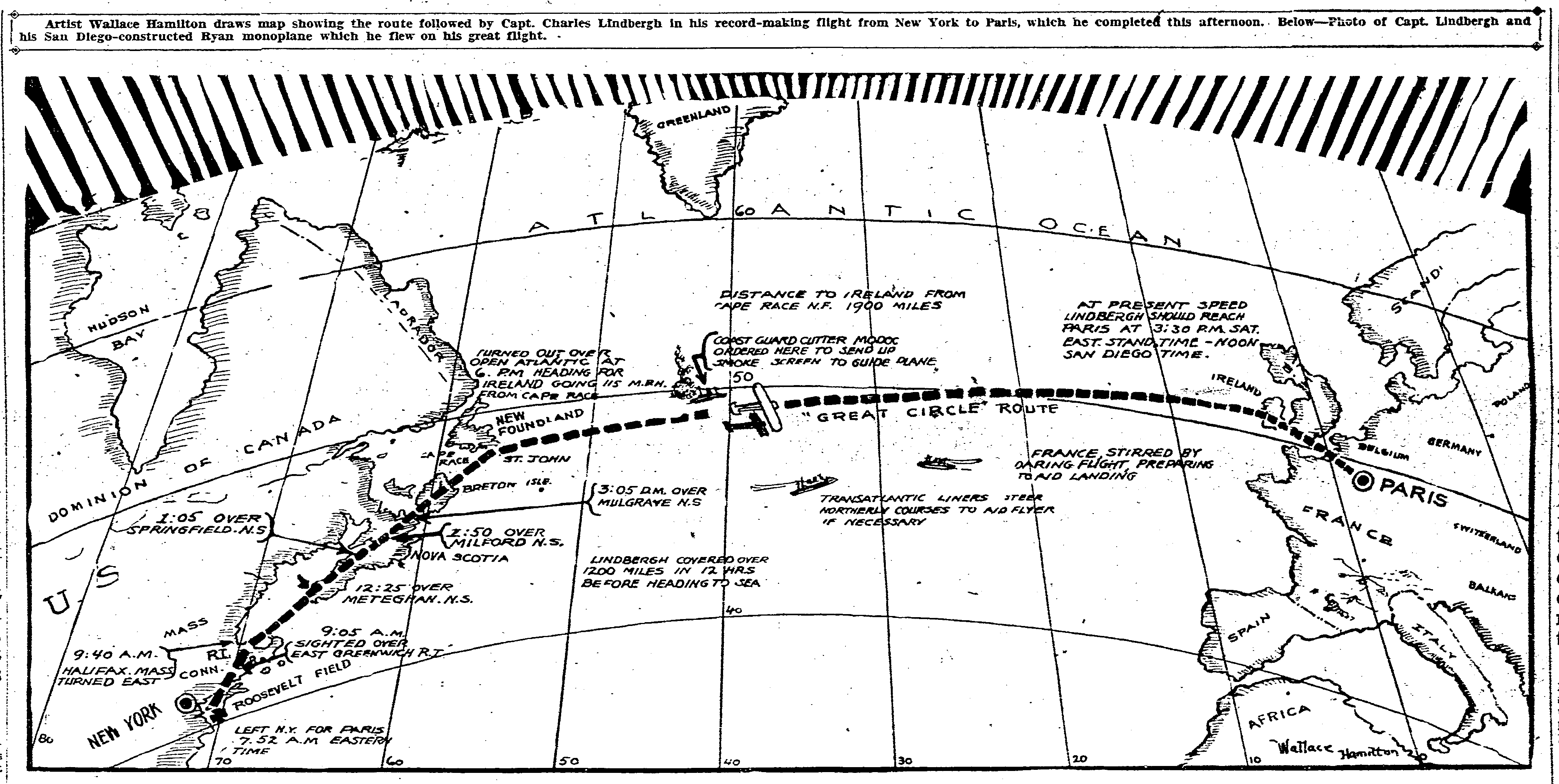
Map of Lindbergh's route on the May 21, 1927, front page of the San Diego Evening Tribune, by artist Wallace Hamilton

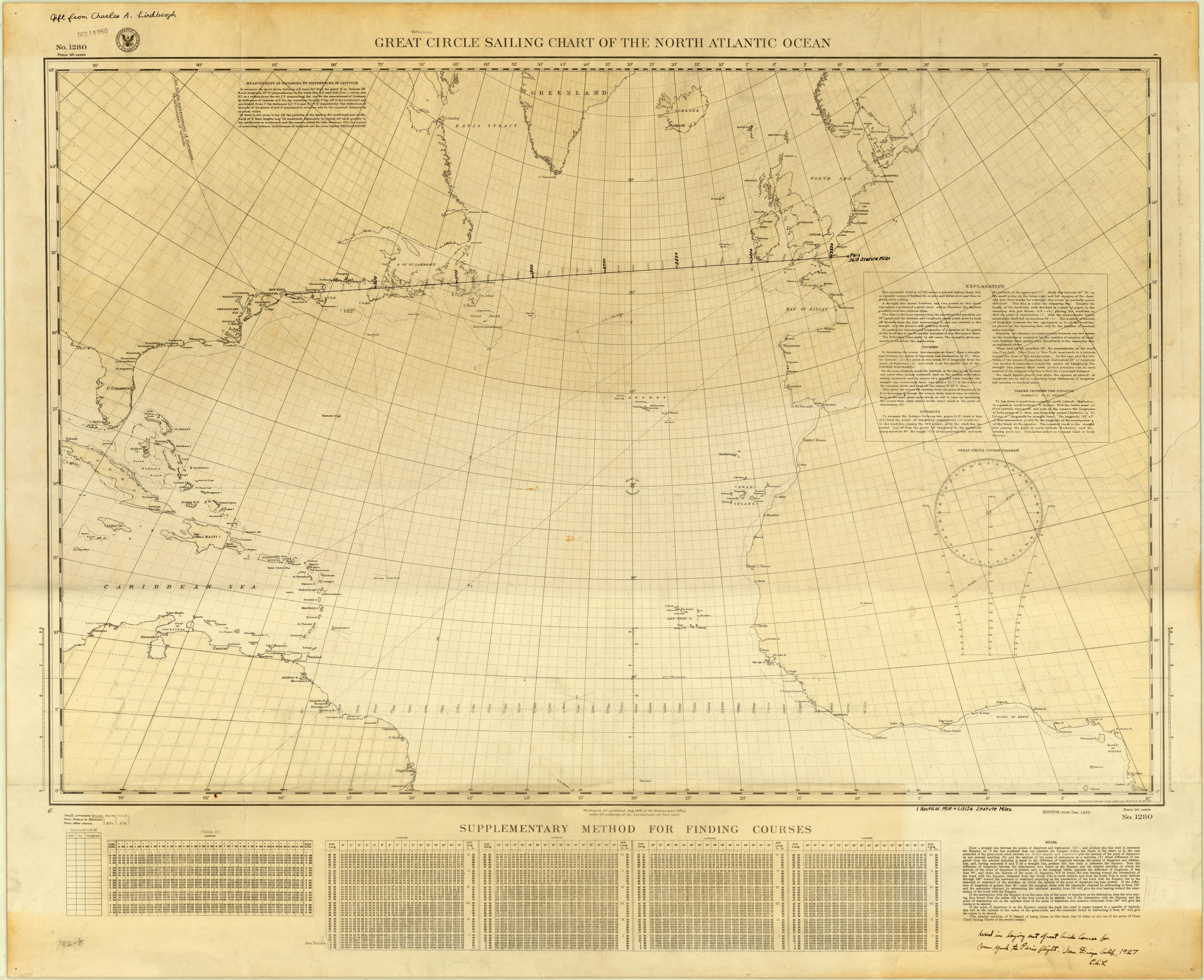
Great circle sailing chart of the North Atlantic with gnomonic projection, published by the U.S. Hydrographic Office and annotated by Lindbergh. He described this chart as a "nugget of gold" and used it to plot the course of his 1927 flight

Stars appeared as night fell around 8:00 PM. The sea became obscured by fog, prompting Lindbergh to climb "from an altitude of 800 feet (240 m) to 7,500 feet (2,300 m) to stay above the quickly-rising cloud." An hour later, he was flying at 10,000 feet (3,000 m). A towering thunderhead stood in front of Lindbergh, and he flew into the cloud, but turned back after he noticed ice forming on the plane. While inside the cloud, Lindbergh "thrust a bare hand through the cockpit window", and felt the "sting of ice particles." After returning to open sky, he "curved back to his course." At 11:52 PM, Lindbergh was in warmer air, and no ice remained on the Spirit; he was flying 90 miles per hour (140 km/h) at 10,000 feet (3,000 m), and was 500 miles (800 km) from Newfoundland. Eighteen hours into the flight, Lindbergh was halfway to Paris, and while he had planned to celebrate at this point, he instead felt "only dread." Because Lindbergh flew through several time zones, dawn came earlier, at around 2:52 AM. He began to hallucinate about two hours later. At this point in the flight, he "continually" fell asleep, awakening "seconds, possibly minutes, later." However, after "flying for hours in or above the fog", the weather finally began to clear. 7:52 AM marked 24 hours in the air for Lindbergh and he did not feel as tired by this point.

At around 9:52 AM New York time, or 27 hours after he left Roosevelt Field, Lindbergh saw "porpoises and fishing boats", a sign he had reached the other side of the Atlantic. Lindbergh circled and flew closely, but no fishermen appeared on the boat decks, although he did see a face watching from a porthole. Dingle Bay, in County Kerry of southwest Ireland, was the first European land that Lindbergh encountered; he veered to get a better look and consulted his charts, identifying it as the southern tip of Ireland. The local time in Ireland was 3:00 PM. Flying over Dingle Bay, the Spirit was "2.5 hours ahead of schedule and less than 3 miles (5 km) off course." Lindbergh had navigated "almost precisely to the coastal point he had marked on his chart." Lindbergh wanted to reach the French coast in daylight, so increased his speed to 110 miles per hour (180 km/h). The English coast appeared ahead of him, and he was "now wide awake." A report came from Plymouth, on the English coast, that Lindbergh's plane had started across the English Channel. News soon spread across both "Europe and the United States that Lindbergh had been spotted over England", and a crowd started to form at Le Bourget Aerodrome as he neared Paris. At sunset, he flew over Cherbourg, on the French coast 200 miles (320 km) from Paris; it was around 2:52 PM New York time.

Over the 33 1/2 hours of the flight, the aircraft fought icing, flew blind through fog for several hours, and Lindbergh navigated only by dead reckoning (he was not proficient at navigating by the sun and stars and he rejected radio navigation gear as heavy and unreliable). Fortunately, the winds over the Atlantic cancelled each other out, giving Lindbergh zero wind drift—and thus accurate navigation during the long flight over featureless ocean.

Silent short film documenting his flight and landing in Paris

On arriving at Paris, Lindbergh "circled the Eiffel Tower" before flying to the airfield. He flew over the crowd at Le Bourget Aerodrome at 10:16 and landed at 10:22 PM on Saturday, May 21, on the far side of the field and "nearly half a mile from the crowd", as reported by The New York Times. The airfield was not marked on his map and Lindbergh knew only that it was some seven miles northeast of the city; he initially mistook it for some large industrial complex because of the bright lights spreading out in all directions‍—‌in fact the headlights of tens of thousands of spectators' cars caught in "the largest traffic jam in Paris history" in their attempt to be present for Lindbergh's landing.

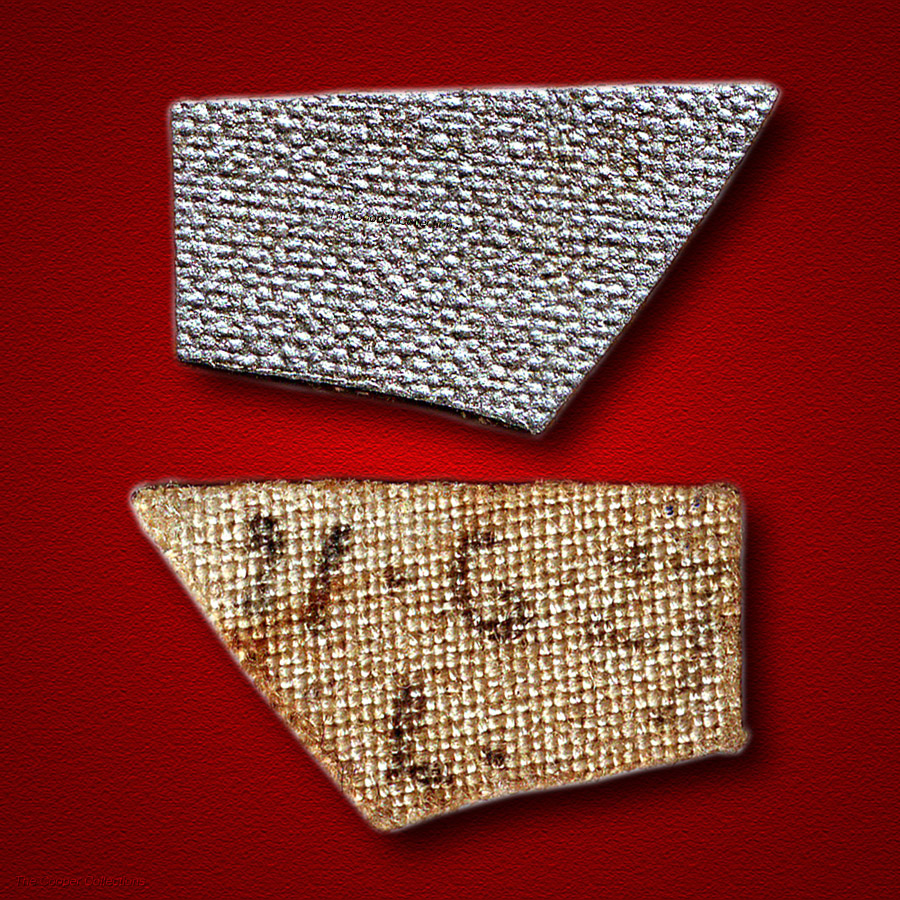
Samples of the Spirit's linen covering

A crowd estimated at 150,000 stormed the field, dragged Lindbergh out of the cockpit, and carried him around above their heads for "nearly half an hour." Some minor damage was done to the Spirit by souvenir hunters before pilot and plane reached the safety of a nearby hangar with the aid of French military fliers, soldiers, and police. The Times reported that before the police could intervene the "souvenir mad" spectators "stripped the plane of everything which could be taken off", and were cutting off pieces of linen when "a squad of soldiers with fixed bayonets quickly surrounded" the plane, providing guard as it was "wheeled into a shed." Lindbergh met the U.S. Ambassador to France, Myron T. Herrick, across Le Bourget field in a "little room with a few chairs and an army cot." The lights in the room were turned off to conceal his presence from the frenzied crowd, which "surged madly" trying to find him. Lindbergh shook hands with Herrick and handed him several letters he had carried across the Atlantic, three of which were from Col. Theodore Roosevelt Jr., son of former President Theodore Roosevelt, who had written letters of introduction at Lindbergh's request. Lindbergh left the airfield around midnight and was driven through Paris to the ambassador's residence, stopping to visit the French Tomb of the Unknown Soldier at the Arc de Triomphe; after arriving at the residence, he slept for the first time in about 60 hours.

Lindbergh's flight was certified by the National Aeronautic Association of the United States based on the readings from a sealed barograph placed in the Spirit.

== Global fame ==
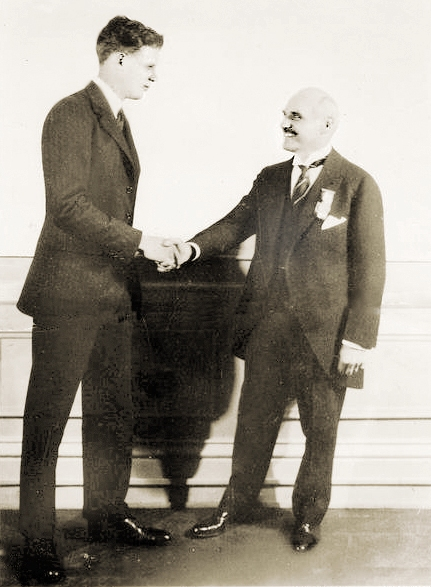
Lindbergh accepts the prize from Raymond Orteig in New York, June 16, 1927

Lindbergh received unprecedented acclaim after his historic flight. In the words of biographer A. Scott Berg, people were "behaving as though Lindbergh had walked on water, not flown over it". The New York Times printed an above the fold, page-wide headline: "Lindbergh Does It!" and his mother's house in Detroit was surrounded by a crowd reported at nearly a thousand. Lindbergh became "an international celebrity, with invitations pouring in for him to visit European countries", and he "received marriage proposals, invitations to visit cities across the nation, and thousands of gifts, letters, and endorsement requests." At least "200 songs were written" in tribute to Lindbergh and his flight. "Lucky Lindy!", written and composed by L. Wolfe Gilbert and Abel Baer, was finished on May 21 itself, and was "performed to great acclaim in several Manhattan clubs" that night. After landing, Lindbergh was eager to embark on a tour of Europe. As he noted in a speech a few weeks afterward, his flight marked the first time he "had ever been abroad", and he "landed with the expectancy, and the hope, of being able to see Europe."

The morning after landing, Lindbergh appeared on the balcony of the U.S. embassy, responding "briefly and modestly" to the calls of the crowd. The French Foreign Office flew the American flag, the first time it had saluted someone who was not a head of state. At the Élysée Palace, French President Gaston Doumergue bestowed the Légion d'honneur on Lindbergh, pinning the award on his lapel, with Ambassador Herrick present for the occasion. Lindbergh also made flights to Belgium and Britain in the Spirit before returning to the United States. On May 28, Lindbergh flew to Evere Aerodrome in Brussels, Belgium, circling the field three times for the cheering crowd and taxiing to a halt just after 3:00 PM, as a thousand children waved American flags. On his way to Evere, Lindbergh had met an escort of ten planes from the airport, who found him on course near Mons but had trouble keeping up as the Spirit was averaging "about 100 miles an hour." After landing, Lindbergh was welcomed by military officers and prominent officials, including Belgian Prime Minister Henri Jaspar, who led the procession of Lindbergh's plane to a "platform where it was raised to the view of cheering thousands." "It was a splendid flight," Lindbergh declared, stating: "I enjoyed every minute of it. The motor is in fine shape and I could circle Europe without touching it." Belgian troops with fixed bayonets protected the Spirit to avoid a repeat of the damage at Le Bourget. From Evere, Lindbergh motored to the U.S. embassy, and then went to place a wreath on the Belgian tomb of the unknown soldier. He then visited the Belgian royal palace at the invitation of King Albert I, where the king made Lindbergh a Knight of the Order of Leopold; as Lindbergh shook the king's hand, he said: "I have heard much of the famous soldier-king of the Belgians." The United Press reported that "One million persons are in Brussels today to greet Lindbergh", constituting "the greatest welcome ever accorded a private citizen in Belgium."

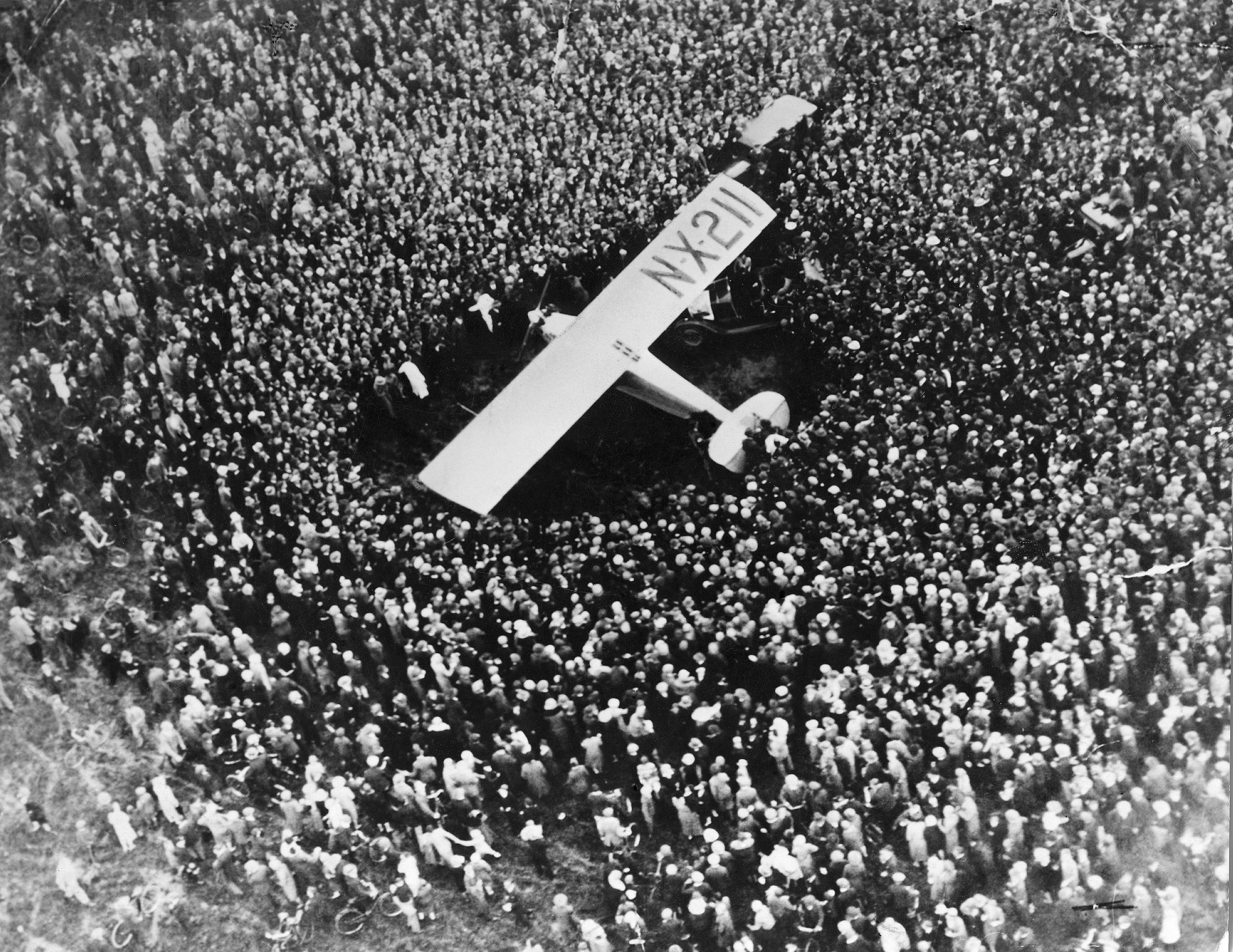
The Spirit mobbed by a crowd at Croydon Air Field in South London on May 29, 1927

After Belgium, Lindbergh traveled to the United Kingdom. He departed Brussels and arrived at Croydon Air Field in the Spirit on May 29, where a crowd of 100,000 "mobbed" him. Before reaching the airfield, Lindbergh overflew London where crowds, some on roofs, "gazed at the flyer" and observers with "field glasses in the West End business district" watched him. About 50 minutes before Lindbergh landed, the "roads leading toward Croydon airport were jammed." Flying into the airfield, he "appeared on the horizon" at 5:50 PM accompanied by six British military planes, but the massive crowd "swept over the guard lines" and forced Lindbergh to circle the airfield "while police battled the crowd", and "not until 10 minutes later had they cleared a space large enough" for him to land. Police reserves were sent to the airfield in "large numbers", but it was not enough to contain the multitude. As the plane came to a stop, the crowd "waved American flags, smashed fences, and knocked down police", while Lindbergh himself was described as "grinning and serene" amid the "seething" crowd. The United Press reported that a "man's leg was broken in the crush", and another man fell from atop a hangar and suffered internal injuries. English officials were reportedly "surprised" by the enthusiasm of the welcome. A limousine pulled near the Spirit, escorting Lindbergh to a tower on the field where he responded to the cheering crowd. "All I can say is that this is worse than what happened at Le Bourget Field", Lindbergh told them. "But all the same, I'm glad to be here." When he reached the reception room where British Secretary of State for Air Sir Samuel Hoare, U.S. Ambassador Alanson B. Houghton, and others waited, Lindbergh's first words were: "Save my plane!" Mechanics moved the Spirit to a hangar where it was placed "under a military guard." Also present at Croydon were former Secretary of State for Air Lord Thomson, Director of Civil Aviation Sir Sefton Brancker, and Brig. Gen. P. R. C. Groves.

Newsreel of Lindbergh landing in Brussels, Belgium, soon after his historic transatlantic flight

Accompanied by two Royal Air Force planes, Lindbergh then flew 90 miles from Croydon to Gosport, where he left the Spirit to be dismantled for shipment back to New York. On May 31, accompanied by an attache of the U.S. Embassy, Lindbergh visited British Prime Minister Stanley Baldwin at 10 Downing Street and then motored to Buckingham Palace, where King George V received him as a guest and awarded him the British Air Force Cross. In anticipation of Lindbergh's visit to the palace, a crowd massed "hoping to get a glimpse" of him. The crowd became so great that police had to call in reserves from Scotland Yard. Upon his arrival back in the United States aboard the U.S. Navy cruiser USS Memphis (CL-13) on June 11, 1927, a fleet of warships and multiple flights of military aircraft escorted him up the Potomac River to the Washington Navy Yard, where President Calvin Coolidge awarded him the Distinguished Flying Cross. Lindbergh received the first award of this medal, but it violated the authorizing regulation. Coolidge's own executive order, published in March 1927, required recipients to perform their feats of airmanship "while participating in an aerial flight as part of the duties incident to such membership [in the Organized Reserves]", which Lindbergh failed to satisfy.

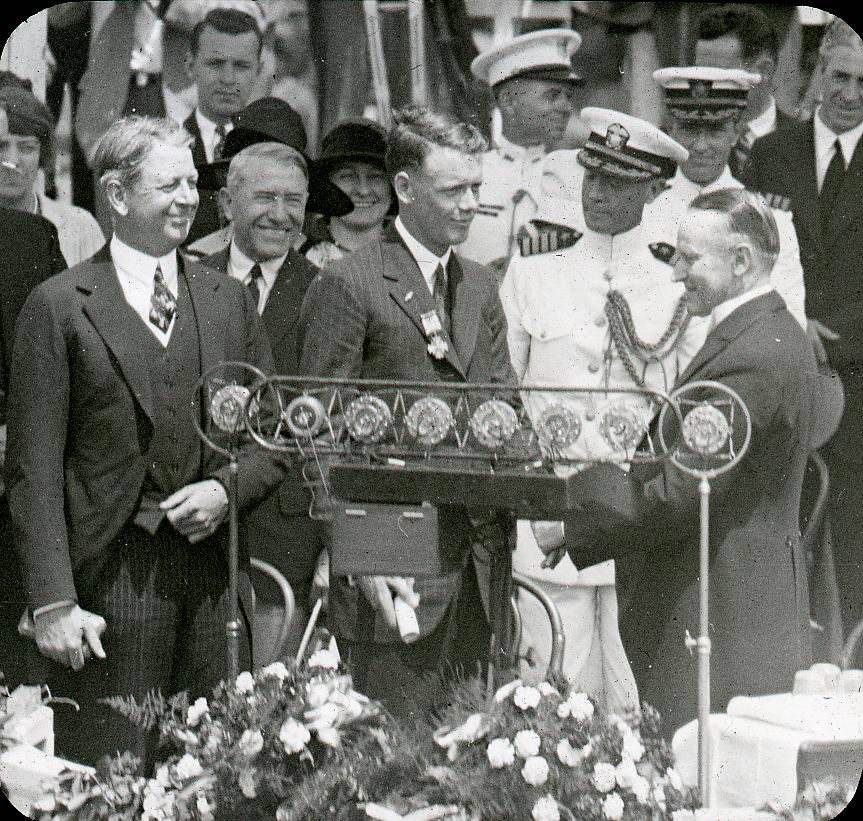
President Calvin Coolidge awards Lindbergh the Distinguished Flying Cross, June 11, 1927

Lindbergh flew from Washington, D.C., to New York City on June 13, arriving in Lower Manhattan. He traveled up the Canyon of Heroes to City Hall, where he was received by Mayor Jimmy Walker. A ticker-tape parade followed to Central Park Mall, where he was awarded the New York Medal for Valor at a ceremony hosted by New York Governor Al Smith and attended by a crowd of 200,000. Some 4,000,000 people saw Lindbergh that day. That evening, Lindbergh was accompanied by his mother and Mayor Walker when he was the guest of honor at a 500-guest banquet and dance held at Clarence MacKay's Long Island estate, Harbor Hill.

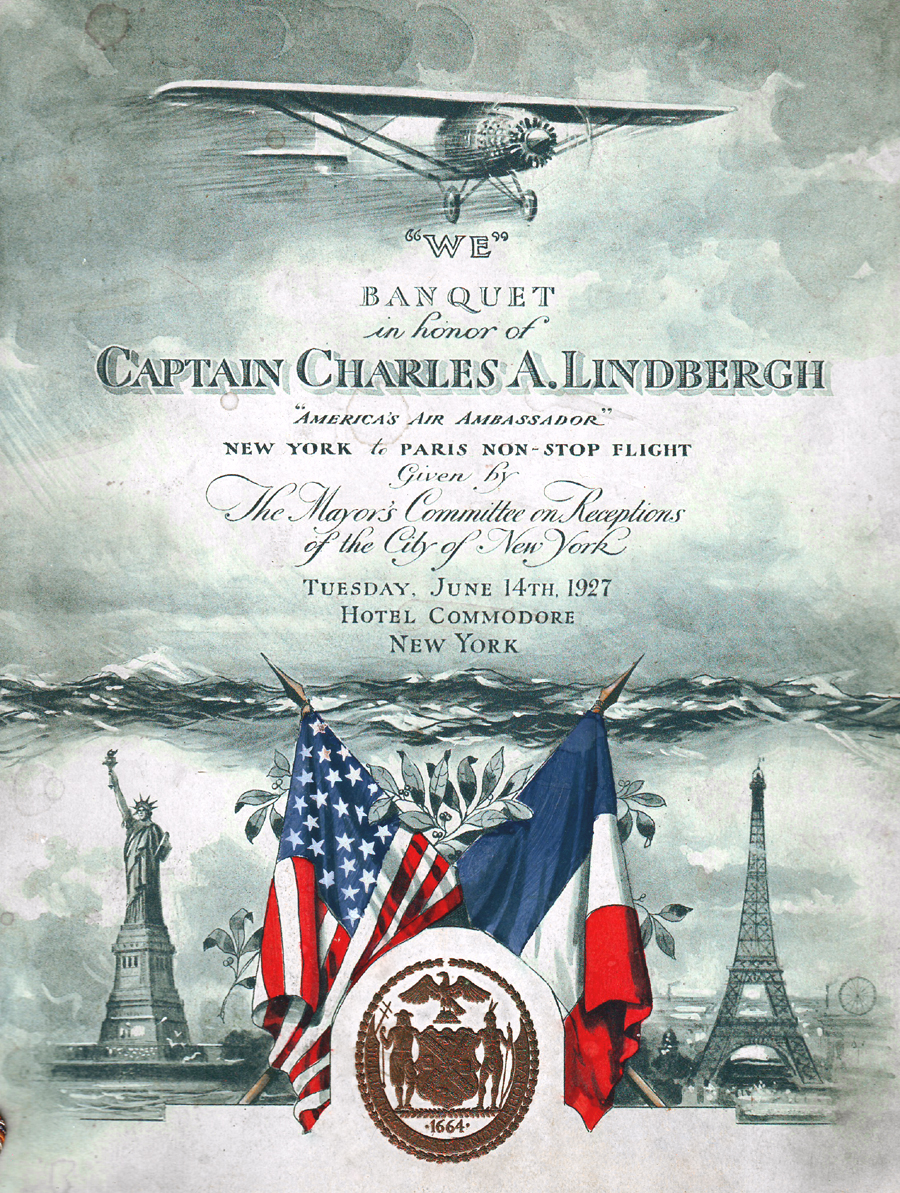
The New York City "WE" Banquet, held on June 14, 1927

The following night, Lindbergh was honored with a grand banquet at the Hotel Commodore given by the Mayor's Committee on Receptions of the City of New York and attended by some 3,700 people. He was officially awarded the check for the prize on June 16.

On July 18, 1927, Lindbergh was promoted to the rank of colonel in the Air Corps of the Officers Reserve Corps of the U.S. Army.

On December 14, 1927, a Special Act of Congress awarded Lindbergh the Medal of Honor, despite the fact that it was almost always awarded for heroism in combat. It was presented to Lindbergh by President Coolidge at the White House on March 21, 1928. The medal contradicted Coolidge's earlier executive order directing that "not more than one of the several decorations authorized by Federal law will be awarded for the same act of heroism or extraordinary achievement" (Lindbergh was recognized for the same act with both the Medal of Honor and the Distinguished Flying Cross). The statute authorizing the award was also criticized for apparently violating procedure; House legislators reportedly neglected to have their votes counted.

Lindbergh was honored as the first Time magazine Man of the Year (now called "Person of the Year") when he appeared on that magazine's cover at age 25 on January 2, 1928; he remained the youngest Time Person of the Year until Greta Thunberg in 2019. The winner of the 1930 Best Woman Aviator of the Year Award, Elinor Smith Sullivan, said that before Lindbergh's flight:

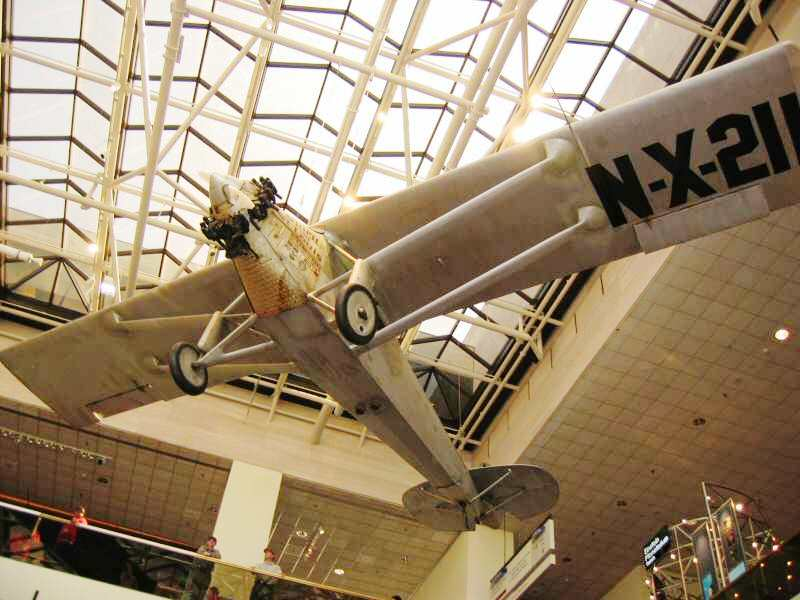
The Spirit of St. Louis on display at the National Air and Space Museum

People seemed to think we [aviators] were from outer space or something. But after Charles Lindbergh's flight, we could do no wrong. It's hard to describe the impact Lindbergh had on people. Even the first walk on the moon doesn't come close. The twenties was such an innocent time, and people were still so religious—I think they felt like this man was sent by God to do this. And it changed aviation forever because all of a sudden the Wall Streeters were banging on doors looking for airplanes to invest in. We'd been standing on our heads trying to get them to notice us but after Lindbergh, suddenly everyone wanted to fly, and there weren't enough planes to carry them.

=== Autobiography and tours ===
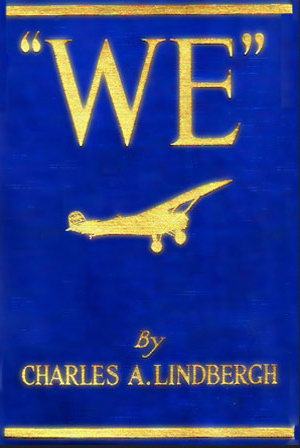
"WE" 1st Edition, 1927

Barely two months after Lindbergh arrived in Paris, G. P. Putnam's Sons published his 318-page autobiography "WE", which was the first of 15 books he eventually wrote or to which he made significant contributions. The company was run by aviation enthusiast George P. Putnam. The dustjacket notes said that Lindbergh wanted to share the "story of his life and his transatlantic flight together with his views on the future of aviation", and that "WE" referred to the "spiritual partnership" that had developed "between himself and his airplane during the dark hours of his flight". However, as Berg wrote in 1998, Putnam's chose the title without "Lindbergh's knowledge or approval", and Lindbergh would "forever complain about it, that his use of 'we' meant him and his backers, not him and his plane, as the press had people believing"; nonetheless, as Berg remarked, "his frequent unconscious use of the phrase suggested otherwise."

Putnam's sold special autographed copies of the book for $25 each, all of which were purchased before publication. "WE" was soon translated into most major languages and sold more than 650,000 copies in the first year, earning Lindbergh more than $250,000. Its success was considerably aided by Lindbergh's three-month, 22,350-mile (35,970 km) tour of the United States in the Spirit on behalf of the Daniel Guggenheim Fund for the Promotion of Aeronautics. Between July 20 and October 23, 1927, Lindbergh visited 82 cities in all 48 states, rode 1,290 mi (2,080 km) in parades, and delivered 147 speeches before 30 million people.

Lindbergh then toured 16 Latin American countries between December 13, 1927, and February 8, 1928. Dubbed the "Good Will Tour", it included stops in Mexico (where he also met his future wife, Anne, the daughter of U.S. Ambassador Dwight Morrow), Guatemala, British Honduras, El Salvador, Honduras, Nicaragua, Costa Rica, Panama, the Canal Zone, Colombia, Venezuela, St. Thomas, Puerto Rico, the Dominican Republic, Haiti, and Cuba, covering 9,390 miles (15,110 km) in just over 116 hours of flight time. A year and two days after it had made its first flight, Lindbergh flew the Spirit from St. Louis to Washington, D.C., where it has been on public display at the Smithsonian Institution ever since. Over the previous 367 days, Lindbergh and the Spirit had logged 489 hours 28 minutes of flight time.

The "Lindbergh boom" in aviation had begun. The volume of mail moving by air increased 50 percent within six months, applications for pilots' licenses tripled, and the number of planes quadrupled. President Herbert Hoover appointed Lindbergh to the National Advisory Committee for Aeronautics.

Lindbergh and Pan American World Airways head Juan Trippe were interested in developing an air route across Alaska and Siberia to China and Japan. In the summer of 1931, with Trippe's support, Lindbergh and his wife flew from Long Island to Nome, Alaska, and from there to Siberia, Japan and China. The flight was carried out with a Lockheed Model 8 Sirius named Tingmissartoq. The route was not available for commercial service until after World War II, as prewar aircraft lacked the range to fly Alaska to Japan nonstop, and the United States had not officially recognized the Soviet government. In China they volunteered to help in disaster investigation and relief efforts for the Central China flood of 1931. This was later documented in Anne's book North to the Orient.

=== Air mail promotion ===
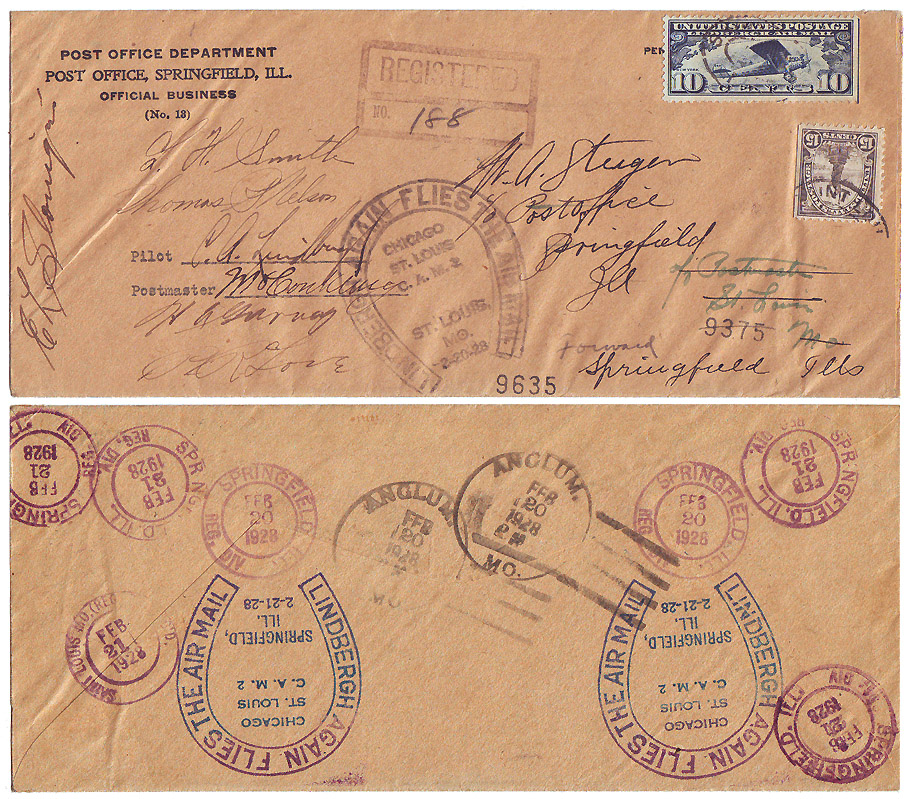
Lindbergh-autographed USPOD penalty cover with C-10 flown by him over CAM-2

Lindbergh used his world fame to promote air mail service. For example, at the request of Basil L. Rowe, the owner of West Indian Aerial Express (and later Pan Am's chief pilot), in February 1928, he carried some 3,000 pieces of special souvenir mail between Santo Domingo, Dominican Repulic; Port-au-Prince, Haiti; and Havana, Cuba‍—‌the last three stops he and the Spirit made during their 7,800 mi (12,600 km) "Good Will Tour" of Latin America and the Caribbean between December 13, 1927, and February 8, 1928, and the only franked mail pieces that he ever flew in his iconic plane.

Two weeks after his Latin American tour, Lindbergh piloted a series of special flights over his old CAM-2 route on February 20 and February 21. Tens of thousands of self-addressed souvenir covers were sent in from all over the world, so at each stop Lindbergh switched to another of the three planes he and his fellow CAM-2 pilots had used, so it could be said that each cover had been flown by him. The covers were then backstamped and returned to their senders as a promotion of the air mail service.

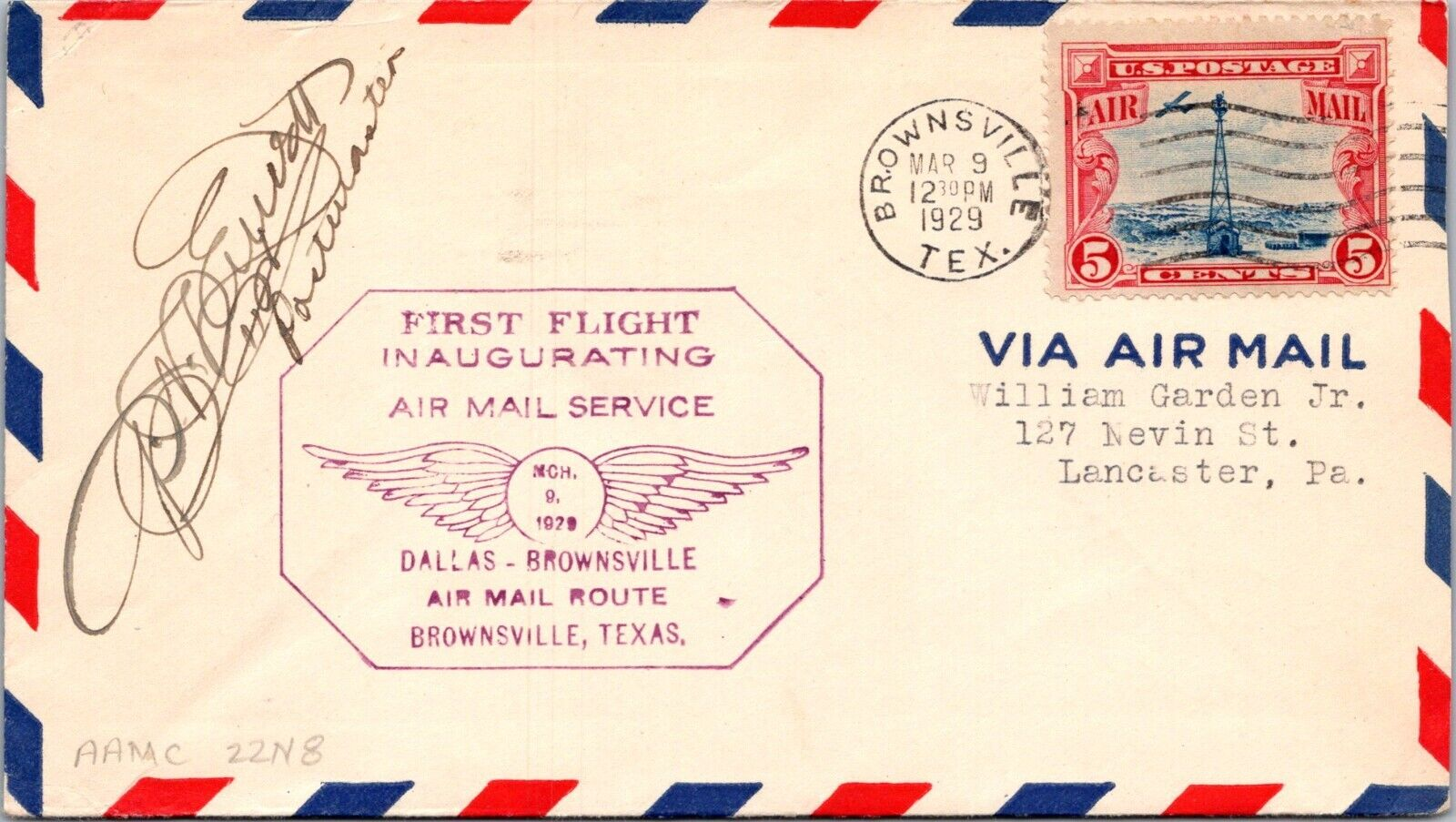
Cover flown aboard the first airmail flight by Charles Lindbergh, from Brownsville, Texas to Mexico City, March 10, 1929

In 1929–1931, Lindbergh carried much smaller numbers of souvenir covers on the first flights over routes in Latin America and the Caribbean, which he had earlier laid out as a consultant to Pan American Airways to be then flown under contract to the Post Office as Foreign Air Mail (FAM) routes 5 and 6.

On March 10, 1929, Lindbergh flew an inaugural flight from Brownsville, Texas, to Mexico City via Tampico, in a Ford Trimotor airplane, carrying a load of U.S. mail. When a number of mail bags came up missing for a period of one month, they subsequently came to be known in the philatelic world as the covers of the "Lost Mail Flight". The historic flight was received with much notoriety in the press and marked the beginning of extended airmail service between the United States and Mexico.

== Personal life ==
=== American family ===
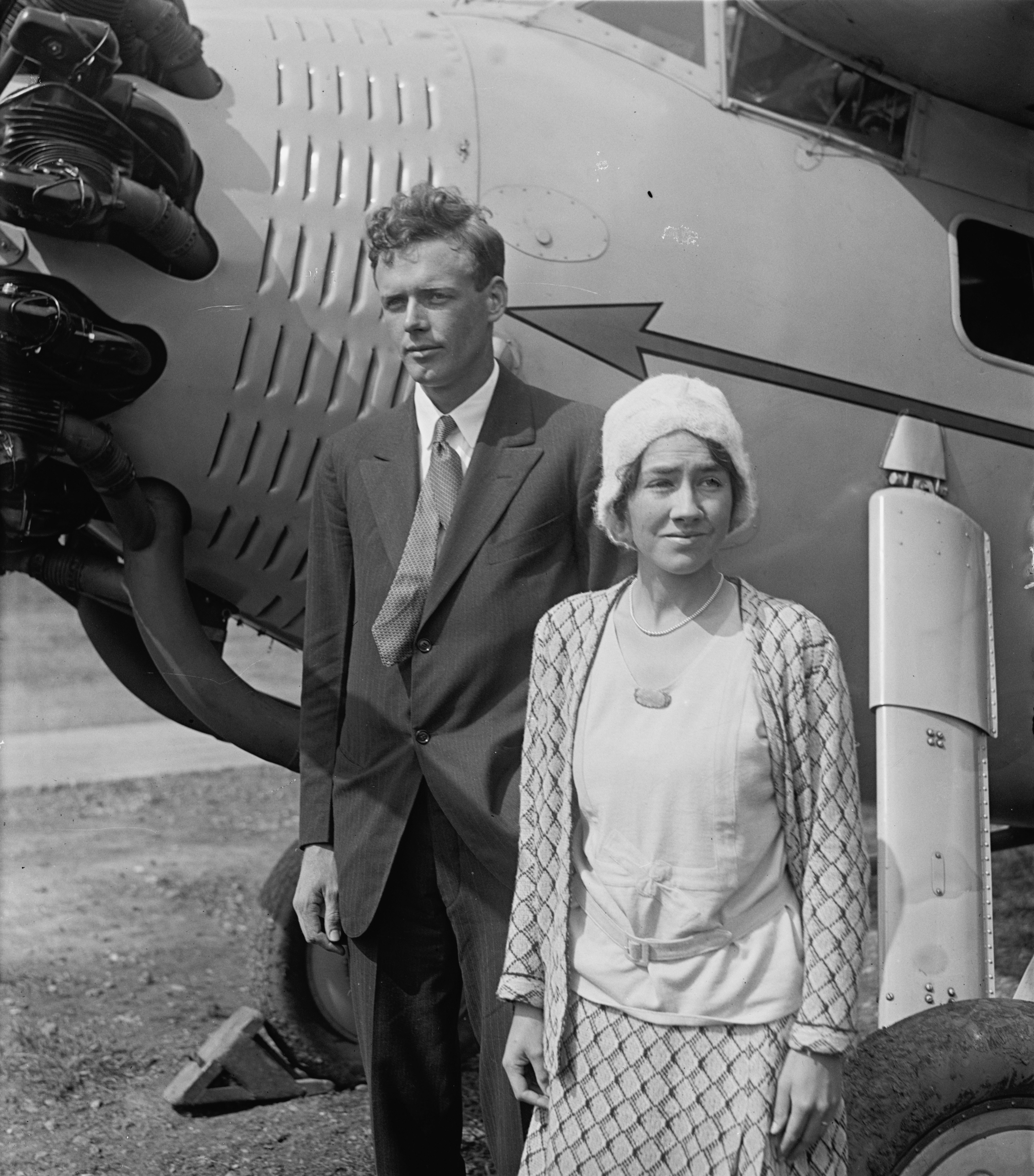
Charles and Anne Morrow Lindbergh in 1929

In his autobiography, Lindbergh derided pilots he met as womanizing "barnstormers"; he also criticized Army cadets for their "facile" approach to relationships. He wrote that the ideal romance was stable and long-term, with a woman with keen intellect, good health, and strong genes, his "experience in breeding animals on our farm [having taught him] the importance of good heredity".

Anne Morrow Lindbergh was the daughter of Dwight Morrow, who, as a partner at J.P. Morgan & Co., had acted as financial adviser to Lindbergh. He was also the U.S. Ambassador to Mexico in 1927. Invited by Morrow on a goodwill tour to Mexico along with humorist and actor Will Rogers, Lindbergh met Anne in Mexico City in December 1927.

The couple was married on May 27, 1929, at the Morrow estate in Englewood, New Jersey, where they resided after their marriage before moving to the western part of the state. They had six children: Charles Augustus Lindbergh Jr. (1930–1932); Jon Morrow Lindbergh (1932–2021); Land Morrow Lindbergh (b. 1937), who studied anthropology at Stanford University; Anne Lindbergh (1940–1993); Scott Lindbergh (b. 1942); and Reeve Lindbergh (b. 1945), a writer. Lindbergh taught Anne how to fly, and she accompanied and assisted him in much of his exploring and charting of air routes.

Lindbergh saw his children for only a few months a year. He kept track of each child's infractions (including such things as gum-chewing) and insisted that Anne track every penny of household expenses.

Lindbergh's grandson, aviator Erik Lindbergh, has had notable involvement in both the private spaceflight and electric aircraft industries.

=== Glider hobby ===
Lindbergh came to the Monterey Peninsula with his wife in March 1930 to continue innovations in the design and use of gliders. He stayed at Del Monte Lodge in Pebble Beach, to search for sites for launching gliders. He came to the Palo Corona Ranch in Carmel Valley, California, and stayed there as guests at the Sidney Fish home, where he flew a glider from a ridge at the ranch. Eight men towed the glider to the ridge where he soared over the countryside for 10 minutes and brought the plane down 3 miles below the Highlands Inn. Other flights lasted 70 minutes. In 1930, his wife became the first woman to receive a U.S. glider pilot license.

=== Kidnapping of Charles Lindbergh Jr. ===
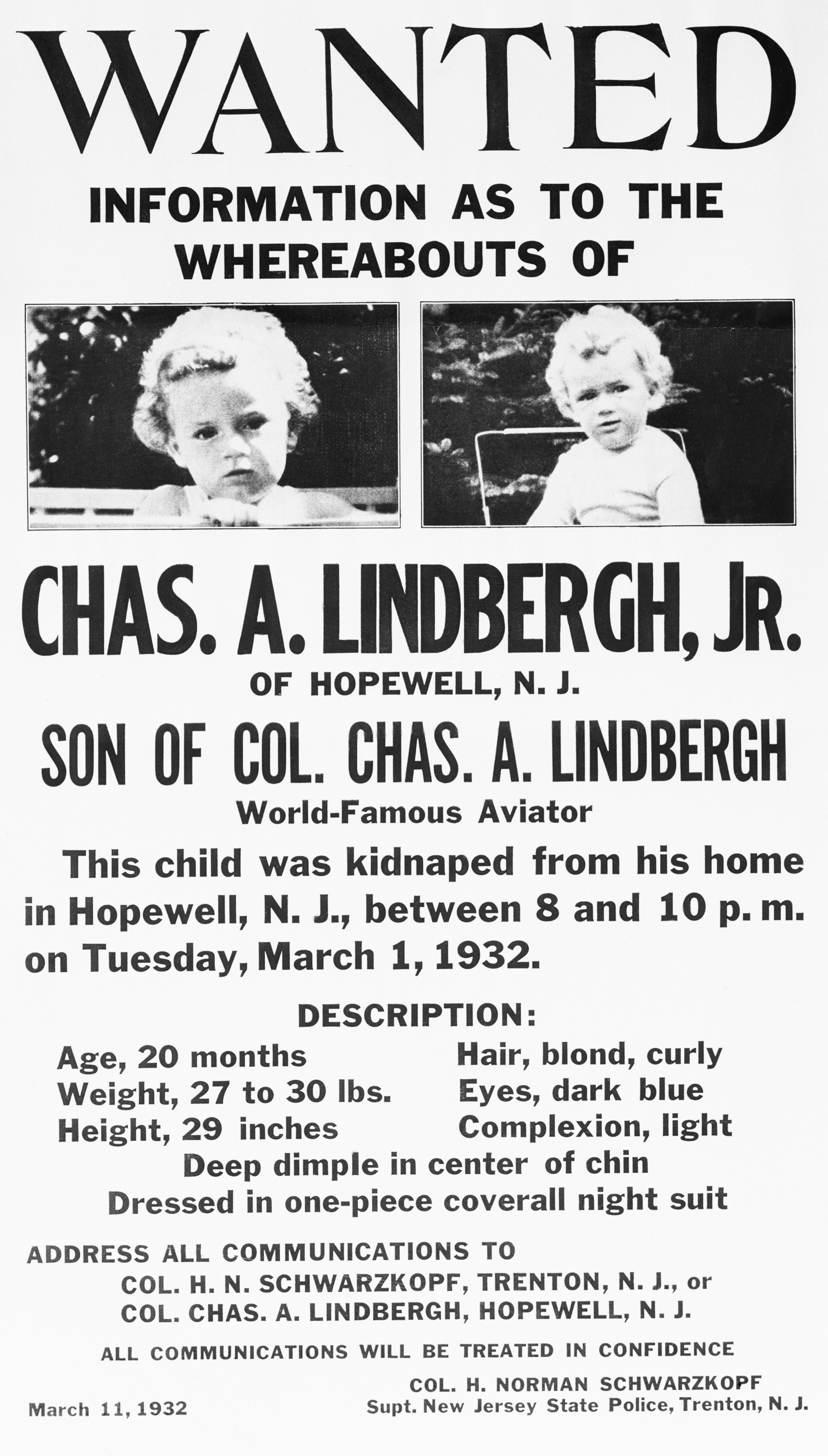
1932 missing person poster for Lindbergh's son

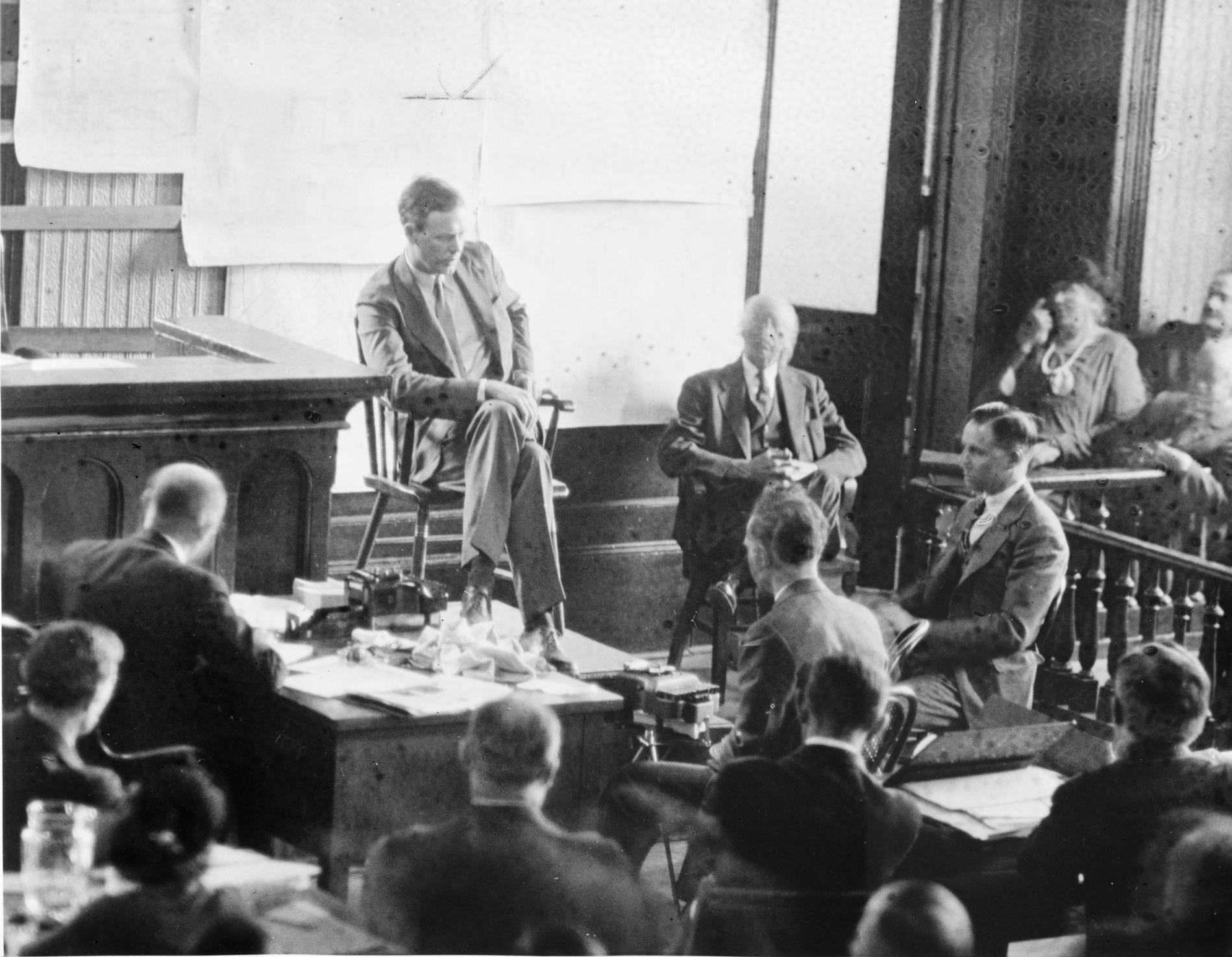
Lindbergh testifying at the Richard Hauptmann trial in 1935. Hauptmann is in half-profile at right.

On the evening of March 1, 1932, twenty-month-old Charles Augustus Lindbergh Jr. was abducted from his crib in the Lindberghs' rural home, Highfields, in East Amwell, New Jersey, near the town of Hopewell. (Note: Quote: So while the world's attention was focused on Hopewell, from which the first press dispatches emanated about the kidnapping, the Democrat made sure its readers knew that the new home of Col. Charles A. Lindbergh and Anne Morrow Lindbergh was in East Amwell Township, Hunterdon County.) A man who claimed to be the kidnapper picked up a cash ransom of $50,000 on April 2, part of which was in gold certificates, which were soon to be withdrawn from circulation and would therefore attract attention; the bills' serial numbers were also recorded. On May 12, the child's remains were found in woods not far from the Lindbergh home.

The case was widely called the "Crime of the Century" and was described by H. L. Mencken as "the biggest story since the Resurrection". In response, Congress passed the so-called "Lindbergh Law", which made kidnapping a federal offense if the victim is taken across state lines or (as in the Lindbergh case) the kidnapper uses "the mail or ... interstate or foreign commerce in committing or in furtherance of the commission of the offense", such as in demanding ransom.

Richard Hauptmann, a 34-year-old German immigrant carpenter, was arrested near his home in the Bronx, New York, on September 19, 1934, after paying for gasoline with one of the ransom bills. $13,760 of the ransom money and other evidence was found in his home. Hauptmann went on trial for kidnapping, murder and extortion on January 2, 1935, in a circus-like atmosphere in Flemington, New Jersey. He was convicted on February 13, sentenced to death, and electrocuted at Trenton State Prison on April 3, 1936. His guilt is contested.

=== In Europe (1936–1939) ===
An intensely private man, Lindbergh became exasperated by the unrelenting public attention in the wake of the kidnapping and trial, and was concerned for the safety of his three-year-old second son, Jon. In the predawn hours of Sunday, December 22, 1935, the family "sailed furtively" from Manhattan for Liverpool, the only three passengers aboard the United States Lines freighter SS American Importer. (Note: Lindbergh's "flight to Europe" ship SS American Importer was sold to Société Maritime Anversoise, Antwerp, Belgium in February 1940 and renamed Ville de Gand. Just after midnight on August 19, 1940, the vessel was torpedoed by the German submarine U-48 about 200 miles west of Ireland while sailing from Liverpool to New York and sank with the loss of 14 crew.) They traveled under assumed names and with diplomatic passports issued through the personal intervention of former U.S. Treasury Secretary Ogden L. Mills.

News of the Lindberghs' "flight to Europe" did not become public until a full day later, and even after the identity of their ship became known radiograms addressed to Lindbergh on it were returned as "Addressee not aboard". They arrived in Liverpool on December 31, then departed for South Wales to stay with relatives.

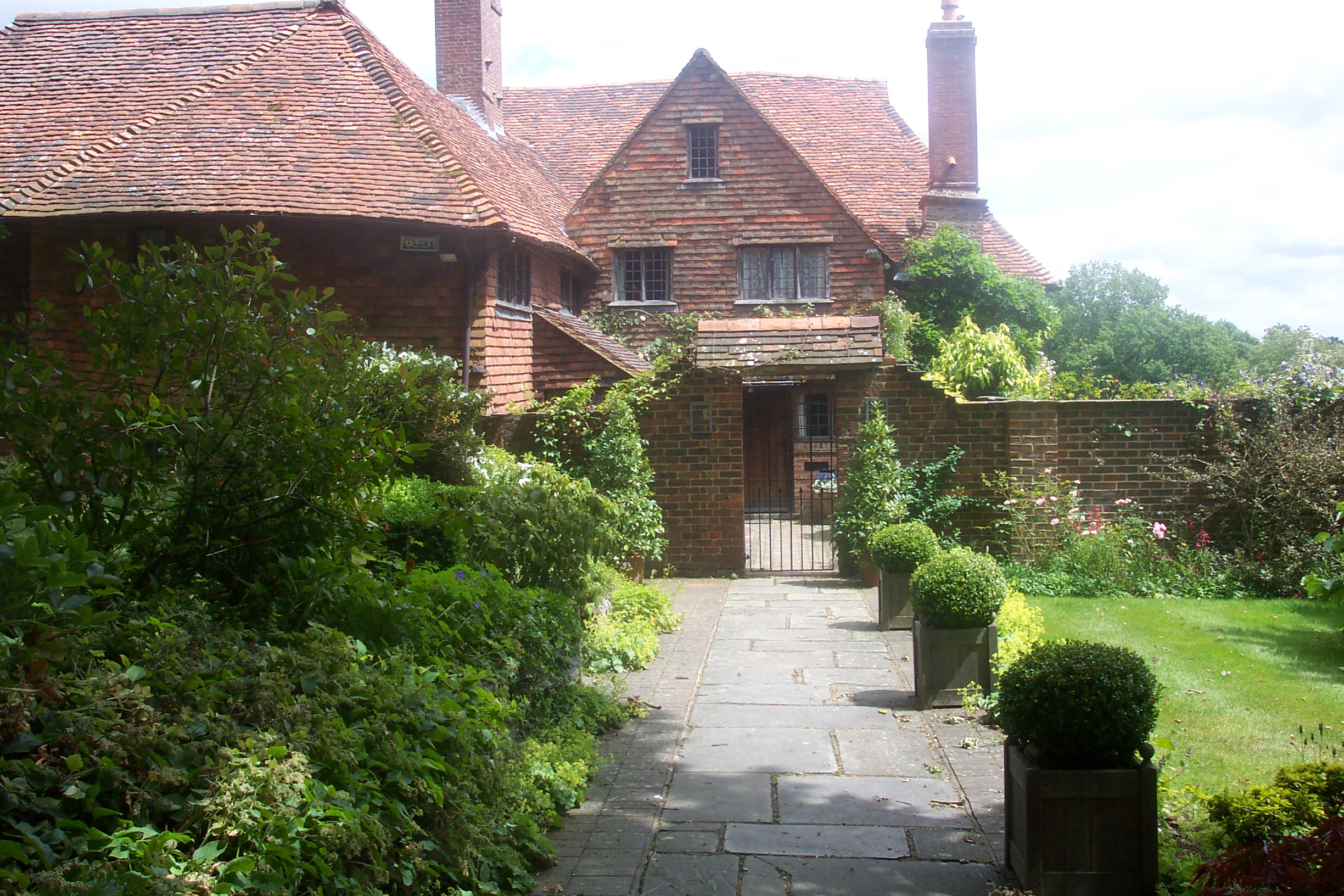
Long Barn, the Lindberghs' rented home in England

The family eventually rented "Long Barn" in Sevenoaks Weald, Kent. In 1938, the family (including a third son, Land, born May 1937 in London) moved to Île Illiec, a small four-acre (1.6 ha) island Lindbergh purchased off the Breton coast of France.

Except for a brief visit to the U.S. in December 1937, the Lindberghs lived and traveled extensively around Europe in their personal Miles M.12 Mohawk two person airplane, before returning to the U.S. in April 1939 and settling in a rented seaside estate at Lloyd Neck, Long Island, New York. The return was prompted by a personal request by General H. H. ("Hap") Arnold, the chief of the United States Army Air Corps in which Lindbergh was a reserve colonel, for him to accept a temporary return to active duty to help evaluate the Air Corps's readiness for war. His duties included evaluating new aircraft types in development, recruitment procedures, and finding a site for a new air force research institute and other potential air bases. Assigned a Curtiss P-36 fighter, he toured various facilities, reporting back to Wilbur Wright Field. Lindbergh's brief four-month tour was also his first period of active military service since his graduation from the Army's Flight School fourteen years earlier in 1925.

== Scientific activities ==
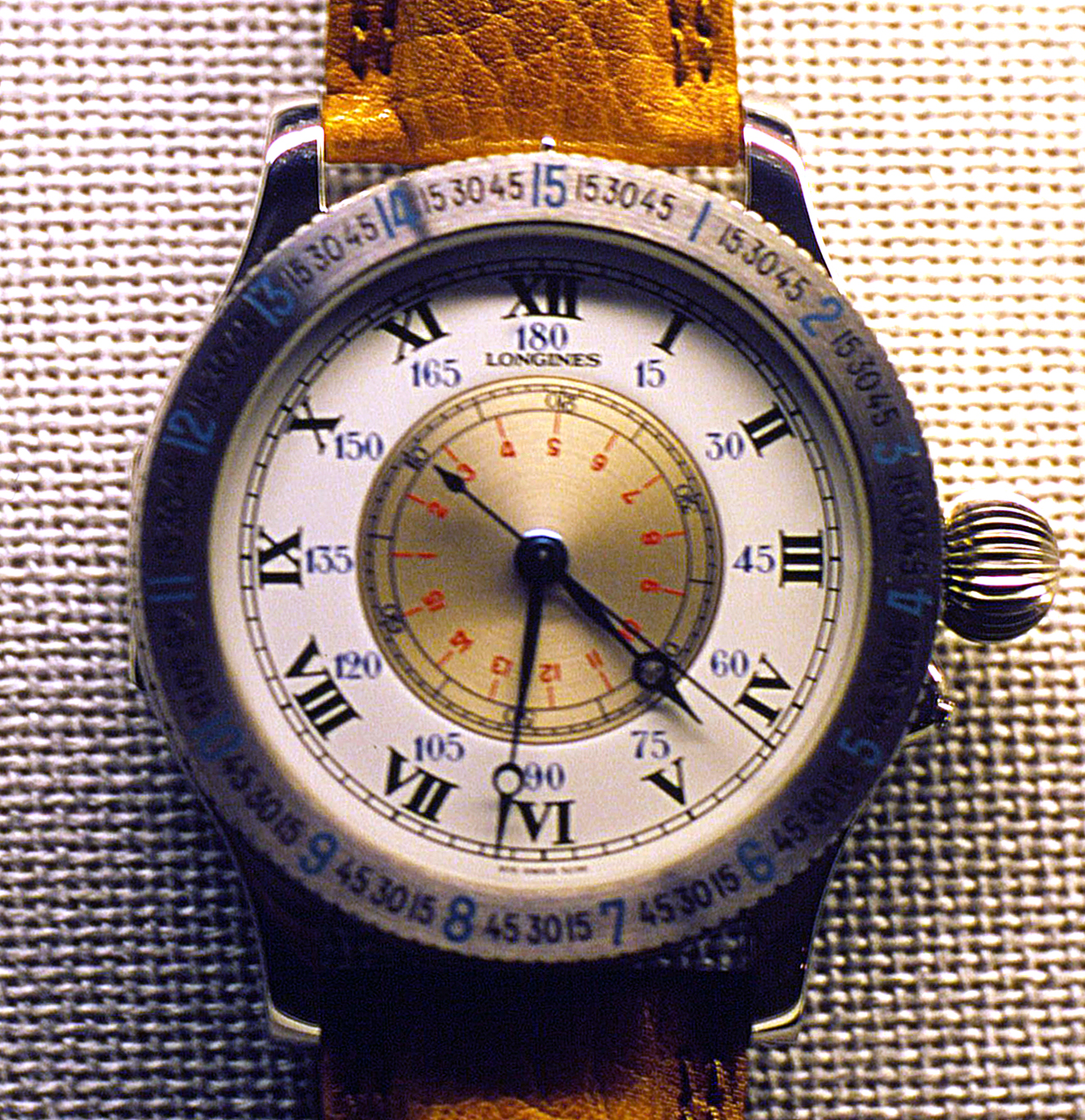
"Lindbergh Hour Angle" watch, produced by Longines

Lindbergh wrote to the Longines watch company and described a watch that would make navigation easier for pilots. First produced in 1931, they called it the "Lindbergh Hour Angle watch", and it remains in production today.

In 1929, Lindbergh became interested in the work of rocket pioneer Robert H. Goddard. By helping Goddard secure an endowment from Daniel Guggenheim in 1930, Lindbergh allowed Goddard to expand his research and development. Throughout his life, Lindbergh remained a key advocate of Goddard's work.

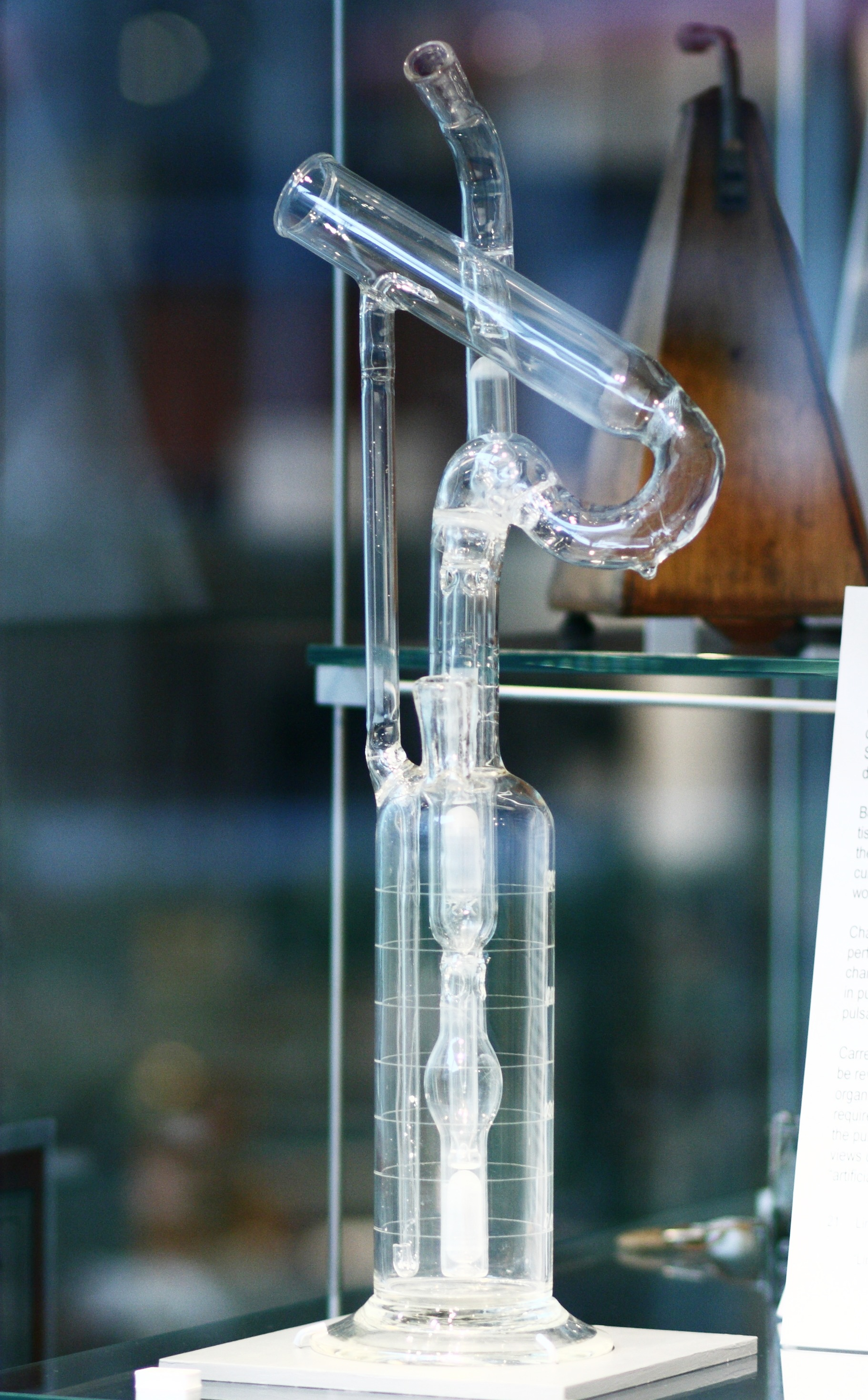
A Lindbergh perfusion pump, c. 1935

In 1930, Lindbergh's sister-in-law developed a fatal heart condition. Lindbergh began to wonder why hearts could not be repaired with surgery. Starting in early 1931 at the Rockefeller Institute and continuing during his time living in France, Lindbergh studied the perfusion of organs outside the body with Nobel Prize-winning French surgeon Alexis Carrel. Although perfused organs were said to have survived surprisingly well, all showed progressive degenerative changes within a few days. Lindbergh's invention, a glass perfusion pump, named the "Model T" pump, is credited with making future heart surgeries possible. In this early stage, the pump was far from perfected. In 1938, Lindbergh and Carrel described an artificial heart in the book in which they summarized their work, The Culture of Organs, but it was decades before one was built. The "Lindbergh perfusion pump" would a receive a large amount public media attention, which included an appearance on the cover of the June 13, 1938 edition of Time and being exhibited at the 1939 World's Fair, where it was billed as being the "Lindbergh-Carrel mechanical heart" and served as one of the focal points of interest in the fair's Medicine and Public Health Buildings. In later years, the perfusion pump was further developed by others, eventually leading to the construction of the first heart-lung machine. However, the American Academy of Cardiovascular Perfusion would acknowledge by 2017 that most researchers in fact found Lindbergh and Carrel's perfusion pump, which at times also known as the "Lindbergh perfusion pump," to be "impractical and difficult to use," and that "by the early 1940s, the pump's time in the spotlight had run out."

== Pre-war activities and politics ==
=== Overseas visits ===
In July 1936, shortly before the opening of the 1936 Summer Olympics in Berlin, American journalist William L. Shirer recorded in his diary: "The Lindberghs are here [in Berlin], and the Nazis, led by Göring, are making a great play for them."

This 1936 visit was the first of several that Lindbergh made at the request of the U.S. military establishment between 1936 and 1938, with the goal of evaluating German aviation. During this visit, the Deutsche Luft Hansa airline held a tea for the Lindberghs, and later invited them for a ride aboard the massive four-engine Junkers G.38 that had been christened Field-Marshal von Hindenburg. Shirer, who was on the flight, wrote:

Somewhere over Wannsee Lindbergh took the controls himself and treated us to some very steep banks, considering the size of the plane, and other little manoeuvres, which terrified most of the passengers. The talk is that the Lindberghs have been favorably impressed by what the Nazis have shown them. He has shown no enthusiasm for meeting the foreign correspondents, who have a perverse liking for enlightening visitors on the Third Reich, as they see it, and we have not pressed for an interview."

Hanna Reitsch demonstrated the Focke-Wulf Fw 61 helicopter to Lindbergh in 1937, and he was the first American to examine Germany's newest bomber, the Junkers Ju 88, and Germany's front-line fighter aircraft, the Messerschmitt Bf 109, which he was allowed to pilot. He said of the Bf 109 that he knew of "no other pursuit plane which combines simplicity of construction with such excellent performance characteristics."

There is disagreement on how accurate Lindbergh's reports were, but Cole asserts that the consensus among British and American officials was that they were slightly exaggerated but badly needed. Arthur Krock, the chief of The New York Times's Washington Bureau, wrote in 1939, "When the new flying fleet of the United States begins to take air, among those who will have been responsible for its size, its modernness, and its efficiency is Colonel Charles A. Lindbergh. Informed officials here, in touch with what Colonel Lindbergh has been doing for his country abroad, are authority for this statement, and for the further observation that criticism of any of his activities – in Germany or elsewhere – is as ignorant as it is unfair." General Henry H. Arnold, the only U.S. Air Force general to hold five-star rank, wrote in his autobiography, "Nobody gave us much useful information about Hitler's air force until Lindbergh came home in 1939." Lindbergh also undertook a survey of aviation in the Soviet Union in 1938.

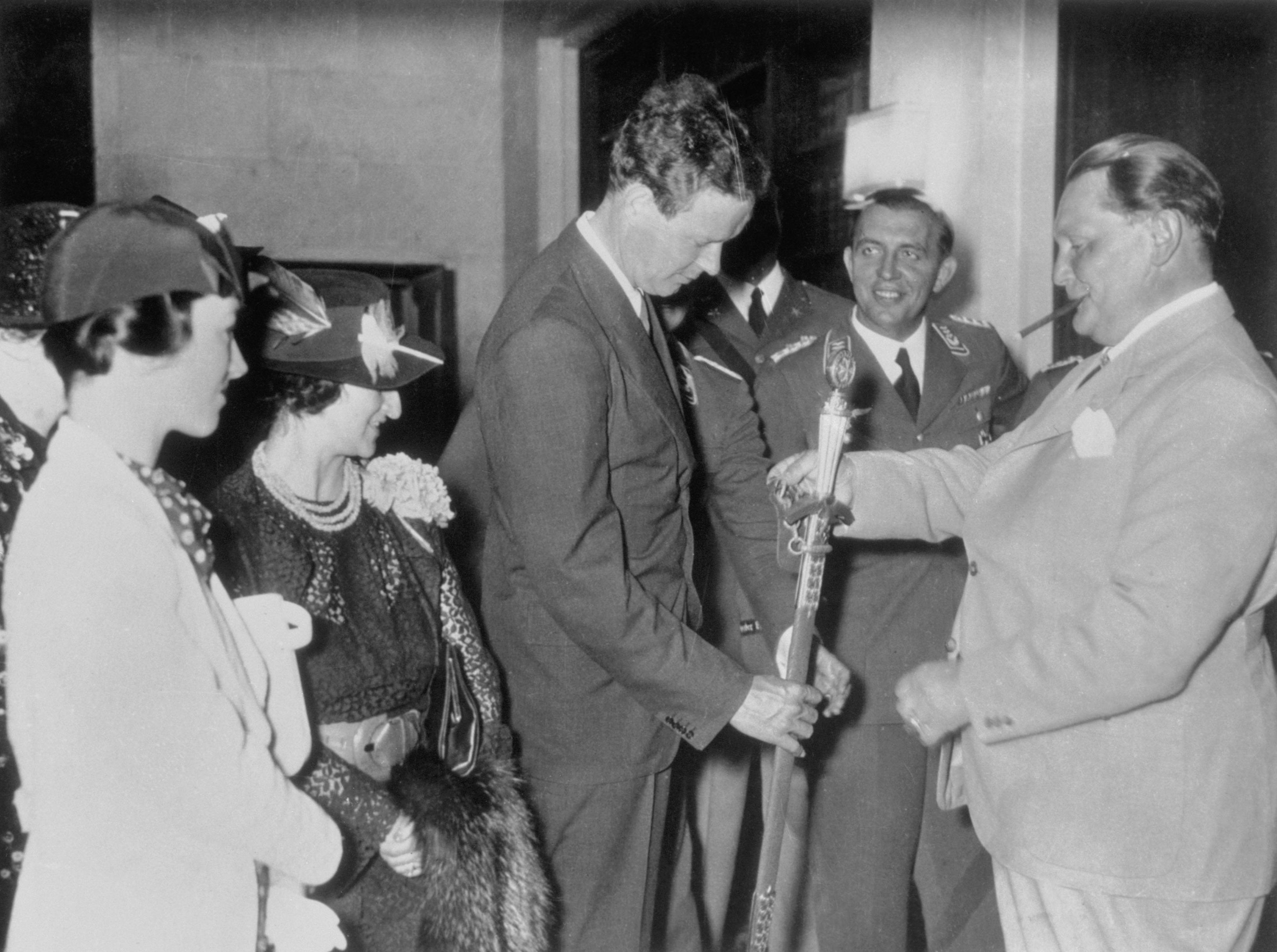
Generalfeldmarschall Göring presenting Colonel Lindbergh with a medal on behalf of Adolf Hitler in October 1938

In 1938, Hugh Wilson, the American ambassador to Germany, hosted a dinner for Lindbergh with Germany's air chief, Generalfeldmarschall Hermann Göring, and three central figures in German aviation: Ernst Heinkel, Adolf Baeumker, and Willy Messerschmitt. At this dinner, Göring presented Lindbergh with the Commander Cross of the Order of the German Eagle. Lindbergh's acceptance became controversial when, only a few weeks after this visit, the Nazi Party carried out the Kristallnacht, a nation-wide anti-Jewish pogrom which is considered a key inaugurating event of the Holocaust. Lindbergh declined to return the medal, later writing:

It seems to me that the returning of decorations, which were given in times of peace and as a gesture of friendship, can have no constructive effect. If I were to return the German medal, it seems to me that it would be an unnecessary insult. Even if war develops between us, I can see no gain in indulging in a spitting contest before that war begins.

Ambassador Wilson later wrote to Lindbergh:

Neither you, nor I, nor any other American present had any previous hint that the presentation would be made. I have always felt that if you refused the decoration, presented under those circumstances, you would have been guilty of a breach of good taste. It would have been an act offensive to a guest of the Ambassador of your country, in the house of the Ambassador.

Lindbergh's reaction to the Kristallnacht was entrusted to his diary: "I do not understand these riots on the part of the Germans", he wrote. "It seems so contrary to their sense of order and intelligence. They have undoubtedly had a difficult 'Jewish problem', but why is it necessary to handle it so unreasonably?" Lindbergh had planned to move to Berlin for the winter of 1938–39. He had provisionally found a house in Wannsee, but after Nazi friends discouraged him from leasing it because it had been formerly owned by Jews, it was recommended that he contact Albert Speer, who said he would build the Lindberghs a house anywhere they wanted. On the advice of his close friend Alexis Carrel, he cancelled the trip.

=== Isolationism and America First Committee ===
In 1938, the U.S. Air Attaché in Berlin invited Lindbergh to inspect the rising power of Nazi Germany's Air Force. Impressed by German technology and the apparently large number of aircraft at their disposal and influenced by the staggering number of deaths from World War I, he opposed U.S. entry into the impending European conflict. In September 1938, he stated to the French cabinet that the Luftwaffe possessed 8,000 aircraft and could produce 1,500 per month. Although this was seven times the actual number determined by the Deuxième Bureau, it influenced France into trying to avoid conflict with Nazi Germany through the Munich Agreement. At the urging of U.S. Ambassador Joseph Kennedy, Lindbergh wrote a secret memo to the British warning that a military response by Britain and France to Hitler's violation of the Munich Agreement would be disastrous; he claimed that France was militarily weak and Britain over-reliant on its navy. He urgently recommended that they strengthen their air power to force Hitler to redirect his aggression against "Asiatic Communism".

Following Hitler's invasion of Czechoslovakia and Poland, Lindbergh opposed sending aid to countries under threat, writing "I do not believe that repealing the arms embargo would assist democracy in Europe" and "If we repeal the arms embargo with the idea of assisting one of the warring sides to overcome the other, then why mislead ourselves by talk of neutrality?" He equated assistance with war profiteering: "To those who argue that we could make a profit and build up our own industry by selling munitions abroad, I reply that we in America have not yet reached a point where we wish to capitalize on the destruction and death of war".

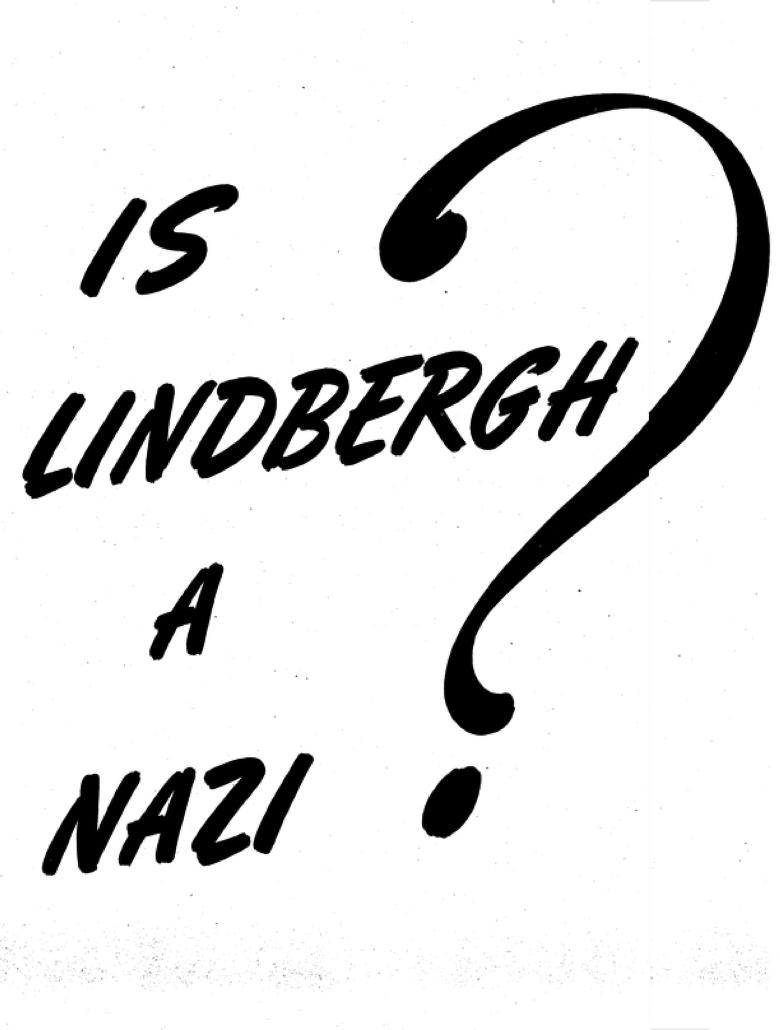
The cover of a propaganda pamphlet published by the interventionist group Friends of Democracy

In August 1939, Leo Szilard suggested using Lindbergh to deliver the Einstein–Szilard letter, which was intended to alert President Roosevelt about the potential of nuclear fission. Because Einstein had previously met Lindbergh, he wrote a letter to the aviator urging him to meet with Szilard, and gave it to Szilard to send. However, Lindbergh did not respond to Einstein's letter, nor to a follow-up letter sent by Szilard on September 13. Two days later, Lindbergh gave a nationwide radio address calling for American isolationism. According to the biographer Walter Isaacson, the speech contained pro-German sympathies and antisemitic implications regarding Jewish ownership of the media. Lindbergh stated: "We must ask who owns and influences the newspaper, the news picture, and the radio station. If our people know the truth, our country is not likely to enter the war." After the broadcast, Szilard wrote to Einstein: "Lindbergh is not our man."

In October 1939, following the outbreak of hostilities between Britain and Germany, and a month after the Canadian declaration of war on Germany, Lindbergh made another nationwide radio address criticizing Canada for drawing the Western Hemisphere "into a European war simply because they prefer the Crown of England" to the independence of the Americas. Lindbergh further stated his opinion that the entire continent and its surrounding islands needed to be free from the "dictates of European powers".

In November 1939, Lindbergh authored a controversial Reader's Digest article in which he deplored the war, but asserted the need for a German assault on the Soviet Union. Lindbergh wrote: "Our civilization depends on peace among Western nations ... and therefore on united strength, for Peace is a virgin who dare not show her face without Strength, her father, for protection".

In late 1940, Lindbergh became the spokesman of the isolationist America First Committee, soon speaking to overflow crowds at Madison Square Garden and Chicago's Soldier Field, with millions listening by radio. He argued emphatically that America had no business attacking Germany. Lindbergh justified this stance in writings that were only published posthumously:

I was deeply concerned that the potentially gigantic power of America, guided by uninformed and impractical idealism, might crusade into Europe to destroy Hitler without realizing that Hitler's destruction would lay Europe open to the rape, loot and barbarism of Soviet Russia's forces, causing possibly the fatal wounding of Western civilization.

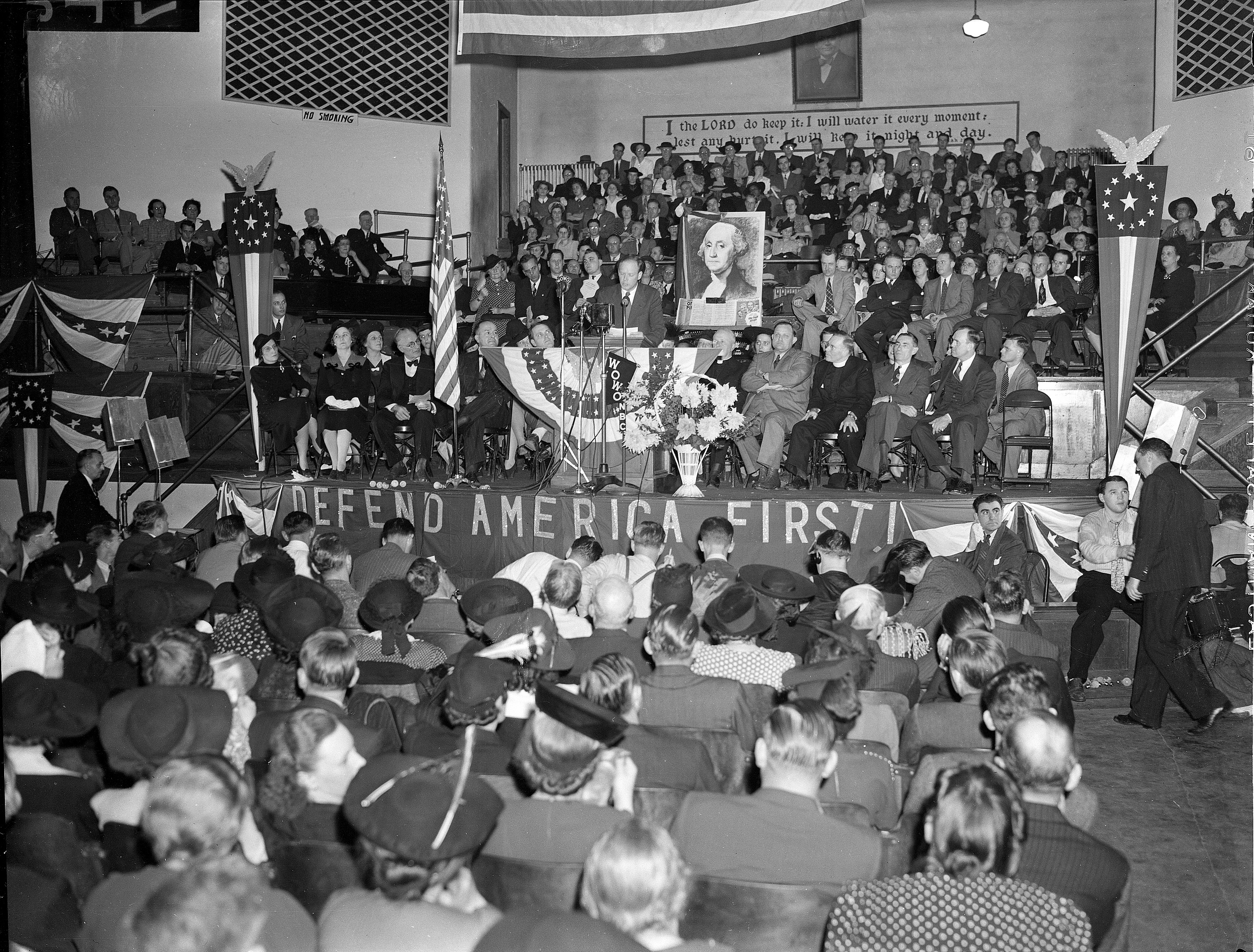
Lindbergh speaking at an AFC rally

In April 1941, he argued before 30,000 members of the America First Committee that "the British government has one last desperate plan ... to persuade us to send another American Expeditionary Force to Europe and to share with England militarily, as well as financially, the fiasco of this war."

In his 1941 testimony before the House Committee on Foreign Affairs opposing the Lend-Lease bill, Lindbergh proposed that the United States negotiate a neutrality pact with Germany. President Roosevelt publicly decried Lindbergh's views as those of a "defeatist and appeaser", comparing him to U.S. Rep. Clement L. Vallandigham, who had led the "Copperhead" movement opposed to the American Civil War. Following this, Lindbergh resigned his colonel's commission in the U.S. Army Air Corps Reserve on April 28, 1941, writing that he saw "no honorable alternative" given that Roosevelt had publicly questioned his loyalty; the next day, The New York Times ran an above the fold, front-page article about his resignation.

On September 11, 1941, Lindbergh delivered a speech for an America First rally at the Des Moines Coliseum that accused three groups of "pressing this country toward war; the British, the Jewish, and the Roosevelt Administration". He said that the British were propagandizing America because they could not defeat Nazi Germany without American aid and that the presidency of Franklin D. Roosevelt was trying to use a war to consolidate power. The three paragraphs Lindbergh devoted to accusing American Jews of war agitation formed what biographer A. Scott Berg called "the core of his thesis". In the speech, Lindbergh said that Jewish Americans had outsized control over government and news media (even though Jews did not compose even 3% of newspaper publishers and were only a minority of foreign policy bureaucrats), employing recognizably antisemitic tropes. The speech received a strong public backlash as newspapers, politicians, and clergy throughout the country criticized America First and Lindbergh for his remarks' antisemitism.

== Antisemitism and views on race ==
His speeches and writings reflected his adoption of views on race, religion, and eugenics, similar to those of the German Nazis, and he was suspected of being a Nazi sympathizer. However, during a speech in September 1941, Lindbergh stated "no person with a sense of the dignity of mankind can condone the persecution of the Jewish race in Germany." Interventionist pamphlets pointed out that his efforts were praised in Nazi Germany and included quotations such as "Racial strength is vital; politics, a luxury."

Roosevelt disliked Lindbergh's outspoken opposition to his administration's interventionist policies, telling Treasury Secretary Henry Morgenthau, "If I should die tomorrow, I want you to know this, I am absolutely convinced Lindbergh is a Nazi." In 1941 he wrote to Secretary of War Henry Stimson: "When I read Lindbergh's speech I felt that it could not have been better put if it had been written by Goebbels himself. What a pity that this youngster has completely abandoned his belief in our form of government and has accepted Nazi methods because apparently they are efficient." Shortly after the war ended, Lindbergh toured a Nazi concentration camp, and wrote in his diary, "Here was a place where men and life and death had reached the lowest form of degradation. How could any reward in national progress even faintly justify the establishment and operation of such a place?"

In a speech on Oct. 12, 1939, Lindbergh stated "Our bond with Europe is a bond of race and not of political ideology. We had to fight a European army to establish democracy in this country. It is the European race we must preserve; political progress will follow. Racial strength is vital; politics, a luxury. If the white race is ever seriously threatened, it may then be time for us to take our part in its protection, to fight side by side with the English, French, and Germans, but not with one against the other for our mutual destruction."

Critics have suggested an influence on Lindbergh of German philosopher Oswald Spengler, a conservative authoritarian popular during the interwar period. In a 1935 interview, Lindbergh stated "There is no escaping the fact that men were definitely not created equal..."

Lindbergh developed a long-term friendship with the automobile pioneer Henry Ford, who was well known for his antisemitic newspaper The Dearborn Independent. In a famous comment about Lindbergh to Detroit's former FBI field office special agent in charge in July 1940, Ford said: "When Charles comes out here, we only talk about the Jews."

Lindbergh considered Russia a "semi-Asiatic" country compared to Germany, and he believed Communism was an ideology that would destroy the West's "racial strength" and replace everyone of European descent with "a pressing sea of Yellow, Black, and Brown". He stated that if he had to choose, he would rather see America allied with Nazi Germany than Soviet Russia. He preferred Nordics, but he believed, after Soviet Communism was defeated, Russia would be a valuable ally against potential aggression from East Asia.

Lindbergh elucidated his beliefs regarding the white race in a 1939 article in Reader's Digest:

We can have peace and security only so long as we band together to preserve that most priceless possession, our inheritance of European blood, only so long as we guard ourselves against attack by foreign armies and dilution by foreign races.

Lindbergh said certain races have "demonstrated superior ability in the design, manufacture, and operation of machines", and that "The growth of our western civilization has been closely related to this superiority." Lindbergh admired "the German genius for science and organization, the English genius for government and commerce, the French genius for living and the understanding of life". He believed, "in America they can be blended to form the greatest genius of all".

In his book The American Axis, Holocaust researcher and investigative journalist Max Wallace agreed with Franklin Roosevelt's assessment that Lindbergh was "pro-Nazi". However, he found that the Roosevelt Administration's accusations of dual loyalty or treason were unsubstantiated. Wallace considered Lindbergh to be a well-intentioned but bigoted and misguided Nazi sympathizer whose career as the leader of the isolationist movement had a destructive impact on Jewish people.

Along with controversial Catholic radio priest Charles Coughlin, Lindbergh would serve as the lead spokesman for the America First Committee.

Lindbergh's Pulitzer Prize–winning biographer, A. Scott Berg, alleged that Lindbergh was not so much a supporter of the Nazi regime as someone so stubborn in his convictions and relatively inexperienced in political maneuvering that he easily allowed rivals to portray him as one. Lindbergh's receipt of the Order of the German Eagle, presented in October 1938 by Generalfeldmarschall Hermann Göring on behalf of Führer Adolf Hitler, was approved without objection by the American embassy. Lindbergh returned to the United States in early 1939 to spread his message of nonintervention. Berg contended Lindbergh's views were commonplace in the United States in the interwar era. Lindbergh's support for the America First Committee was representative of the sentiments of a number of American people.

Berg also noted:

"As late as April 1939‍—‌after Germany overtook Czechoslovakia‍—‌Lindbergh was willing to make excuses for Adolf Hitler. 'Much as I disapprove of many things Hitler had done', he wrote in his diary on April 2, 1939, 'I believe she [Germany] has pursued the only consistent policy in Europe in recent years. I cannot support her broken promises, but she has only moved a little faster than other nations ... in breaking promises. The question of right and wrong is one thing by law and another thing by history.'"

Berg also explained that leading up to the war, Lindbergh believed the great battle would be between the Soviet Union and Germany, not fascism and democracy.

Lindbergh always championed military strength and alertness. He believed that a strong defensive war machine would make America an impenetrable fortress and defend the Western Hemisphere from an attack by foreign powers, and that this was the U.S. military's sole purpose.

While the attack on Pearl Harbor came as a shock to Lindbergh, he did predict that America's "wavering policy in the Philippines" would invite a brutal war there, and in one speech warned, "we should either fortify these islands adequately, or get out of them entirely."

== World War II ==
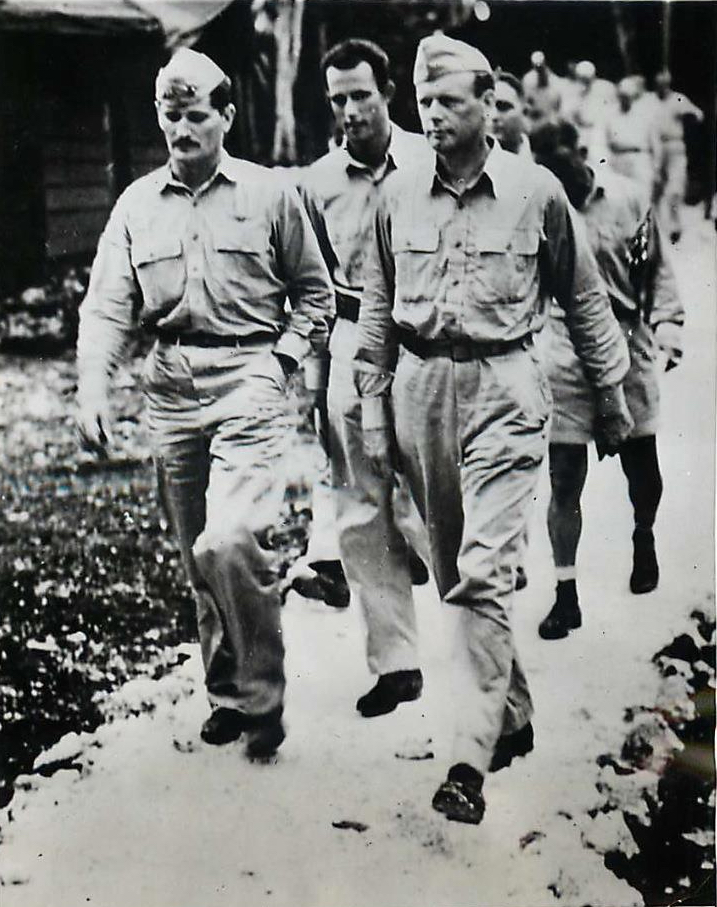
Lindbergh with Marine Corps aces Joe Foss and Marion Carl in May 1944

In January 1942, Lindbergh met with Secretary of War, Henry L. Stimson, seeking to be recommissioned in the Army Air Forces. Stimson was strongly opposed because of the long record of public comments. Blocked from active military service, Lindbergh approached a number of aviation companies and offered his services as a consultant. As a technical adviser with Ford in 1942, he was heavily involved in troubleshooting early problems at the Willow Run Consolidated B-24 Liberator bomber production line. As B-24 production smoothed out, he joined United Aircraft in 1943 as an engineering consultant, devoting most of his time to its Chance-Vought Division.

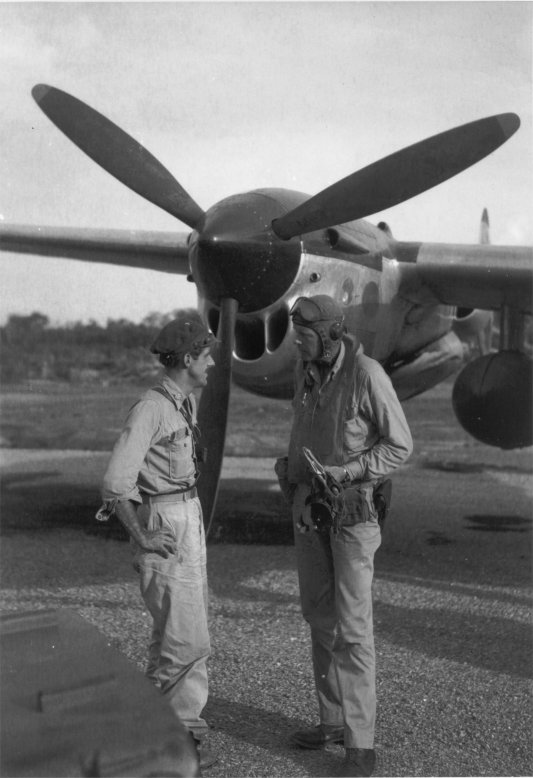
Lindbergh with ace Thomas McGuire on Biak Island in 1944. The aircraft is a P-38 Lightning

In 1944 Lindbergh persuaded United Aircraft to send him as a technical representative to the Pacific Theater to study aircraft performance under combat conditions. In preparation for his deployment to the Pacific, Lindbergh went to Brooks Brothers to buy a naval officer's uniform without insignia and visited Brentano's bookstore in New York to buy a New Testament, writing in his wartime journal entry for April 3, 1944: "Purchased a small New Testament at Brentano's. Since I can only carry one book—and a very small one—that is my choice. It would not have been a decade ago; but the more I learn and the more I read, the less competition it has." He demonstrated how United States Marine Corps Aviation pilots could take off safely with a bomb load double the Vought F4U Corsair fighter-bomber's rated capacity. At the time, several Marine squadrons were flying bomber escorts to destroy the Japanese stronghold of Rabaul, New Britain, in the Australian Territory of New Guinea. On May 21, 1944, Lindbergh flew his first combat mission: a strafing run with VMF-222 near the Japanese garrison of Rabaul. He also flew with VMF-216, from the Marine Air Base at Torokina, Bougainville. Lindbergh was escorted on one of these missions by Lt. Robert E. (Lefty) McDonough, who refused to fly with Lindbergh again, as he did not want to be known as "the guy who killed Lindbergh".

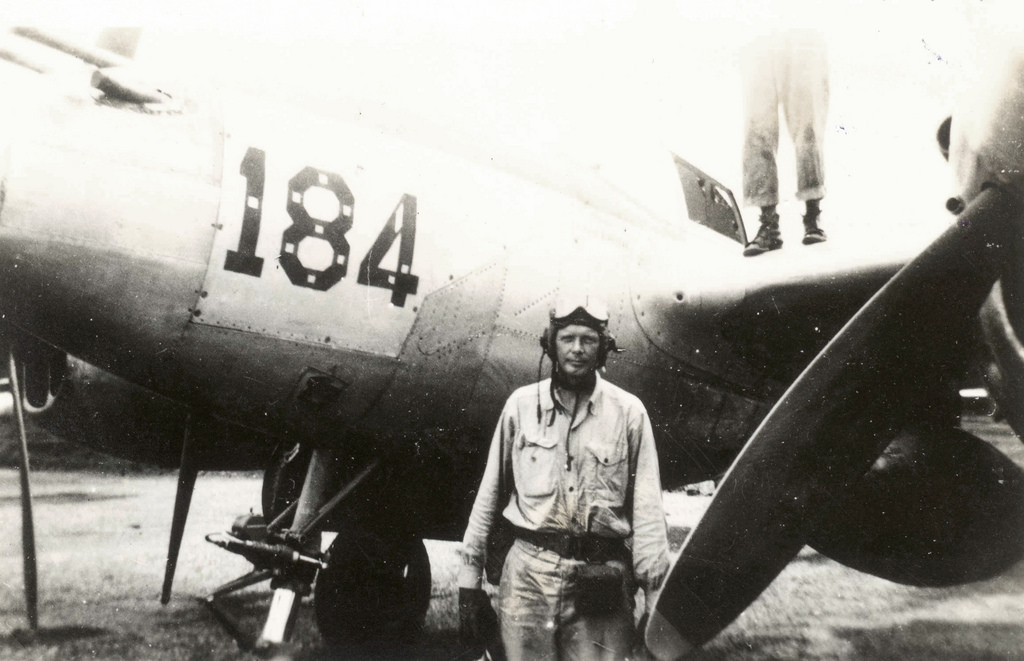
Lindbergh with a P-38J Lightning in 1944

In his six months in the Pacific in 1944, Lindbergh took part in fighter bomber raids on Japanese positions, flying 50 combat missions (again as a civilian). His innovations in the use of Lockheed P-38 Lightning fighters impressed a supportive Gen. Douglas MacArthur. Lindbergh introduced engine-leaning techniques to P-38 pilots, greatly improving fuel consumption at cruise speeds, enabling the long-range fighter aircraft to fly longer-range missions. P-38 pilot Warren Lewis quoted Lindbergh's fuel-saving settings, "He said, '... we can cut the RPM down to 1400 RPMs and use 30 inches of mercury (manifold pressure), and save 50–100 gallons of fuel on a mission.'" The U.S. Marine and Army Air Force pilots who served with Lindbergh praised his courage and defended his patriotism.

On July 28, 1944, during a P-38 bomber escort mission with the 433rd Fighter Squadron in the Ceram area, Lindbergh shot down a Mitsubishi Ki-51 "Sonia" observation plane, piloted by Captain Saburo Shimada, commanding officer of the 73rd Independent Chutai. Lindbergh's participation in combat was revealed in a story in the Passaic Herald-News on October 22, 1944.

In mid-October 1944, Lindbergh participated in a joint Army-Navy conference on fighter planes at NAS Patuxent River, Maryland.

== Later life ==
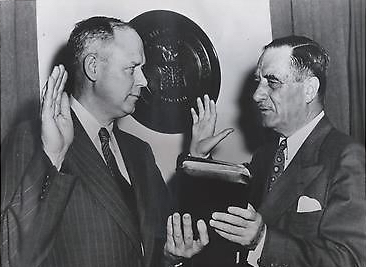
Air Force Secretary Harold Talbott swears Lindbergh in as a U.S. Air Force Reserve brigadier general in April 1954, after President Dwight Eisenhower's nomination

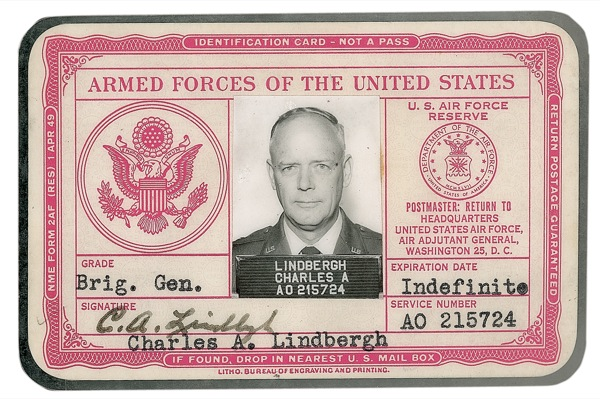
1954 Air Force identification card, with Lindbergh in uniform

After World War II, Lindbergh lived in Darien, Connecticut, and served as a consultant to the Chief of Staff of the United States Air Force and to Pan American World Airways. With most of eastern Europe under communist control, Lindbergh continued to voice concern about Soviet power, observing: "Freedom of speech and action is suppressed over a large portion of the world...Poland is not free, nor the Baltic states, nor the Balkans. Fear, hatred, and mistrust are breeding." In Lindbergh's words, Soviet and communist influence over the post-war world meant that "while our soldiers have been victorious", America had nonetheless not "accomplished the objectives for which we went to war", and he declared: "We have not established peace or liberty in Europe."

Commenting on the post-war world, Lindbergh said that "a whole civilization is in disintegration", and believed America needed to support Europe against communism. Because America had "taken a leading part" in World War II, he said it therefore could not "retire now and leave Europe to the destructive forces" that the war had "let loose." While he still believed his prewar non-interventionism was correct, Lindbergh said the United States now had a responsibility to support Europe, because of "honor, self-respect, and our own national interests." Furthermore, Lindbergh wrote that "we could not let atrocities such as those of the concentration camps go unpunished", and firmly supported the Nuremberg trials.

After the war, Lindbergh toured Germany, covering "almost two thousand miles during his last two weeks" in the country, and also traveled to Paris and participated in "conferences with military personnel and the American Ambassador" during the same trip. While in Germany in June 1945, he toured Dora concentration camp, inspecting the tunnels of Nordhausen and viewing V-1 and V-2 missile parts. He attempted to "reconcile", as Berg wrote, the technology he saw with how the "forces of evil had harnessed it." Reflecting on what happened in the camps, Lindbergh wrote in his wartime journal that it "seemed impossible that men—civilized men—could degenerate to such a level. Yet they had."

In the following page in his journal, he also lamented the mistreatment of Japanese people by Americans and other Allied personnel during the war, comparing these "incidents" to what the Germans did. As Berg wrote in 1998, Lindbergh returned from this two-month European journey "more alarmed about the state of the world than ever", but nonetheless "he knew that the American public no longer gave a hoot for his opinions." Drawing lessons from the war, Lindbergh stated: "No peace will last that is not based on Christian principles, on justice, on compassion...on a sense of the dignity of man. Without such principles there can be no lasting strength...The Germans found that out."

Soon after returning to America, Lindbergh visited his mother in Detroit, and on the train home he wrote a letter wherein he mentioned a "spiritual awareness", speaking of how important it was to spend time in the garden, take in the sun, and listen to birds. In Berg's words, this letter "revealed a changed man." As time went on, Lindbergh became increasingly spiritual in his outlook and grew concerned with the impact science and technology had on the world. In 1948, his Of Flight and Life was published, a book that has been described as an "impassioned warning against the dangers of scientific materialism and the powers of technology." He wrote of his experiences as a combat pilot in the Pacific theater, and declared his conversion from a worshiper of science to a worshiper of the "eternal truths of God", expressing concern for humanity's future. In 1949, he received the Wright Brothers Memorial Trophy and declared in his acceptance speech: "If we are to be finally successful, we must measure scientific accomplishments by their effect on man himself."

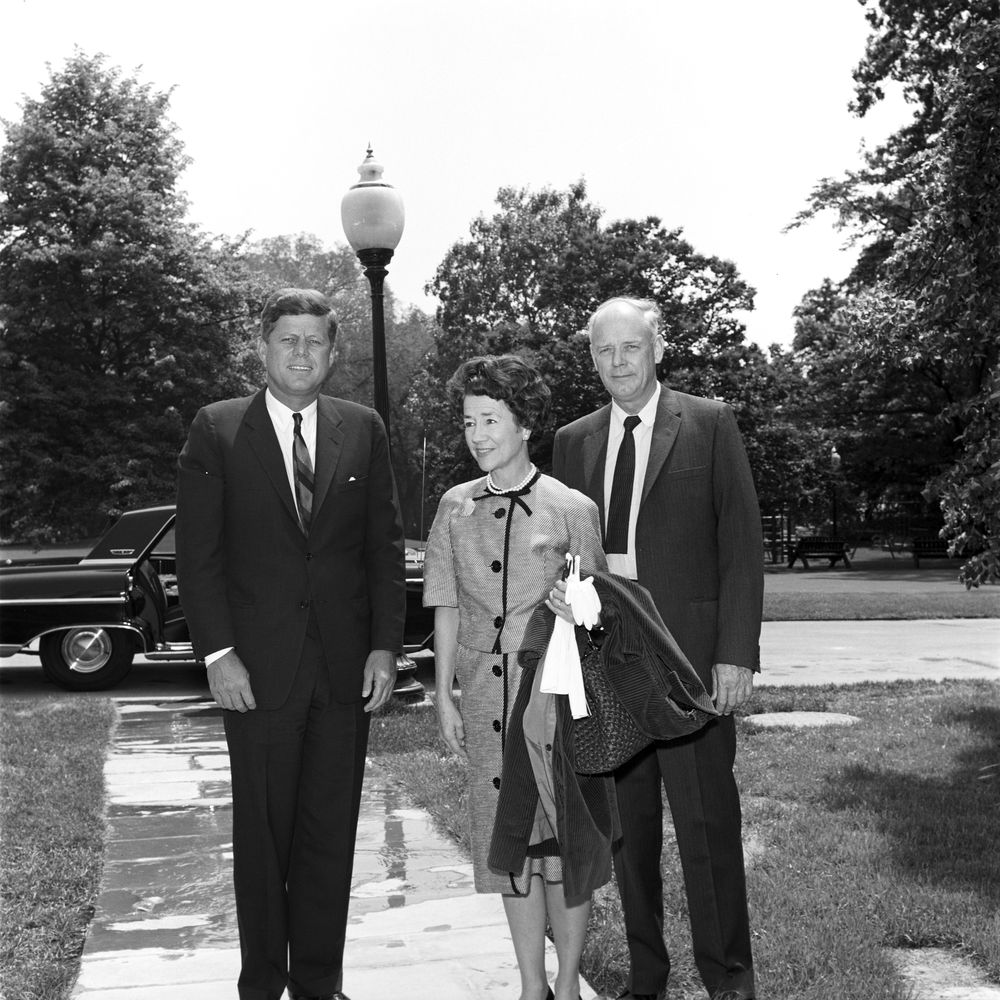
Lindbergh and his wife, Anne, with President John F. Kennedy at the White House in May 1962

On April 7, 1954, on the recommendation of President Dwight D. Eisenhower, Lindbergh was commissioned a brigadier general in the U.S. Air Force Reserve; Eisenhower had nominated Lindbergh for promotion on February 15. Also in that year, he served on a Congressional advisory panel that recommended the site of the United States Air Force Academy. He won the Pulitzer Prize for biography in 1954 with his book, The Spirit of St. Louis, which focuses on his 1927 flight and the events leading up to it. In May 1962, Lindbergh visited the White House with his wife and met President John F. Kennedy, having his picture taken by White House photographer Robert Knudsen.

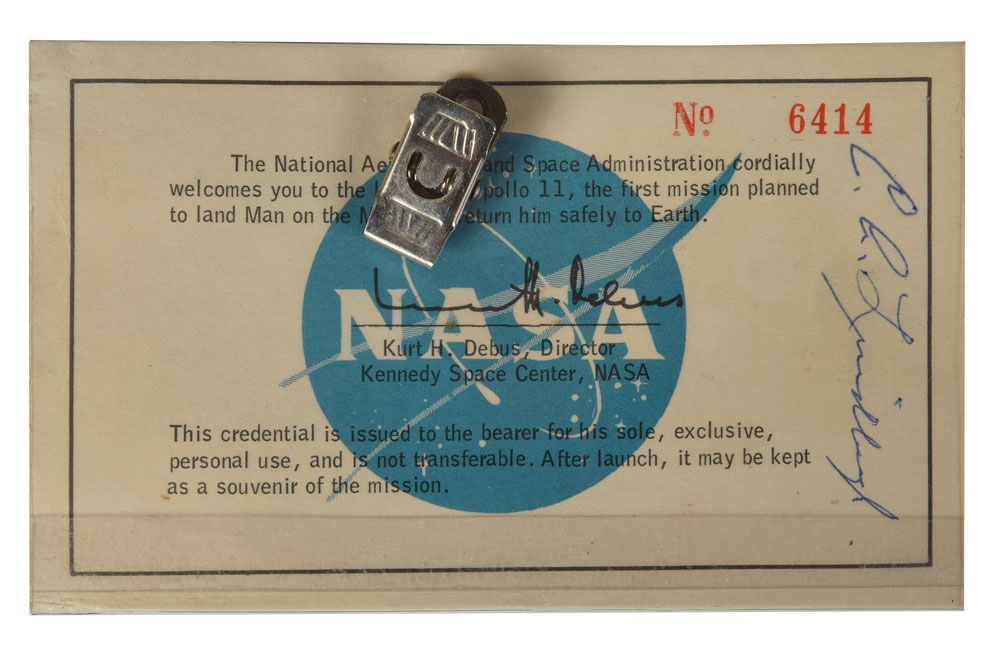
An Apollo 11 viewing pass signed by Lindbergh. He and his wife were Neil Armstrong's personal guests at the 1969 launch.

In December 1968, he visited the astronauts of Apollo 8 (the first crewed mission to orbit the Moon) the day before their launch, and in July 1969 he and his wife witnessed the launch of Apollo 11 as personal guests of Neil Armstrong. Armstrong had met Lindbergh in 1968, and the two corresponded until the latter's death in 1974. In conjunction with the first lunar landing, he shared his thoughts as part of Walter Cronkite's live television coverage. He later wrote the foreword to Apollo astronaut Michael Collins's autobiography. While he maintained his interest in technology, Lindbergh began to focus more on protecting the natural world, and after viewing the Apollo 11 launch, he "participated in a WWF-sponsored dedication of a 900-acre bird preserve."

=== Double life and secret German children ===
Beginning in 1957, Lindbergh engaged in lengthy sexual relationships with three women, while remaining married to Anne Morrow. He fathered three children with hatmaker Brigitte Hesshaimer (1926–2001), who lived in the Bavarian town of Geretsried. He had two children with her sister Mariette, a painter, living in Grimisuat. Lindbergh also had a son and daughter, born in 1959 and 1961, with Valeska, who was his private secretary in Europe and lived in Baden-Baden. All seven children were born between 1958 and 1967.

Ten days before he died, Lindbergh wrote to each of his European mistresses, imploring them to maintain the utmost secrecy about his illicit activities with them even after his death. The three women, none of whom ever married, all kept their affairs secret even from their children, who during his lifetime, and for almost a decade after his death, did not know the true identity of their father, whom they had only known by the alias Careu Kent, and seen only when he briefly visited them once or twice a year.

After reading a magazine article about Lindbergh in the mid-1980s, Brigitte's daughter Astrid deduced the truth. She later discovered photographs and more than 150 love letters from Lindbergh to her mother. After Brigitte and Anne Lindbergh had both died, she made her findings public. In 2003, DNA tests confirmed that Lindbergh had fathered Astrid and her two siblings.

Reeve Lindbergh, Lindbergh's youngest child with Anne, wrote in her personal journal in 2003, "This story reflects absolutely Byzantine layers of deception on the part of our shared father. These children did not even know who he was! He used a pseudonym with them (To protect them, perhaps? To protect himself, absolutely!)"

=== Environmental and tribal causes ===
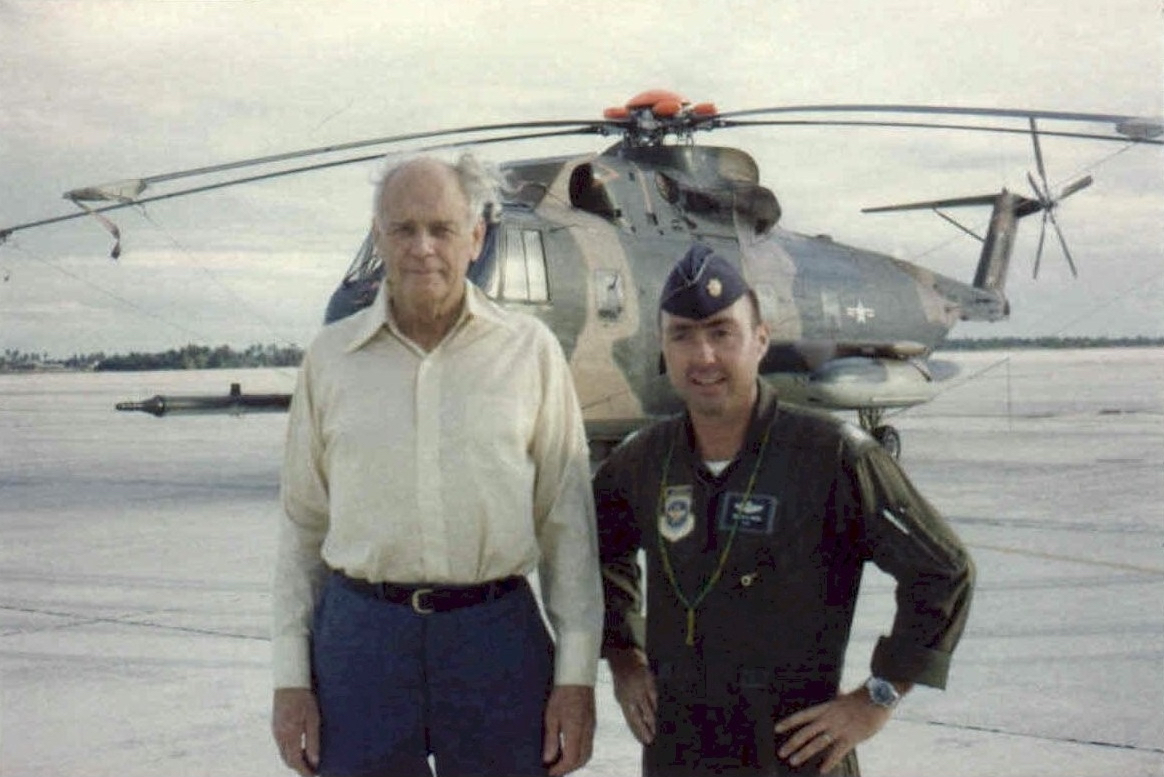
Lindbergh with Air Force Maj. Bruce Ware in 1972 in front of a Sikorsky S-61R, following Ware's air rescue of Lindbergh in the Philippines

In later life Lindbergh was heavily involved in conservation movements, and was deeply concerned about the negative impacts of new technologies on the natural world and native peoples, focusing on regions like Hawaii, Africa, and the Philippines. He campaigned to protect endangered species including the humpback whale, blue whale, Philippine eagle, and the tamaraw (a rare dwarf Philippine buffalo), and was instrumental in establishing protections for the Tasaday and Agta people, and various African tribes such as the Maasai. Alongside Laurance S. Rockefeller, Lindbergh helped establish the Haleakalā National Park in Hawaii. He also worked to protect Arctic wolves in Alaska, and helped establish Voyageurs National Park in northern Minnesota.

In an essay appearing in the July 1964 Reader's Digest, Lindbergh wrote about a realization he had in Kenya during a trip to see land being considered for a national park. He contrasted his time amid the African landscape with his involvement in a supersonic transport convention in New York, and while "lying under an acacia tree", he realized how the "construction of an airplane" was simple compared to the "evolutionary achievement of a bird". He wrote "that if I had to choose, I would rather have birds than airplanes."

In this essay, he questioned his old definition of "progress", and concluded that nature displayed more actual progress than humanity's creations. He wrote several more essays for Reader's Digest and Life, urging people to respect the self-awareness that came from contact with nature, which he called the "wisdom of wildness", and not merely follow science. As David Boocker wrote in 2009, Lindbergh's essays, appearing in popular magazines, "introduced millions of people to the conservation cause", and he made an important "appeal to lead a life less complicated by technology."

On May 14, 1971, Lindbergh received the Philippine Order of the Golden Heart at a formal dinner at Malacañang Palace in Manila. He was described as an aviation pioneer who had symbolized the advance of technology, and who now was a symbol of the drive to protect natural life from technology. Lindbergh actively participated in both conservation and advocacy for tribal minorities in the Philippines, frequently visiting the country and working to protect species including the tamaraw and Philippine eagle, which he described as a "magnificent bird", lending his name to a law against killing or trapping the animal.

In August 1971, in Davao City, he ceremonially received a young Philippine eagle kept in captivity after its mother was killed by a hunter, delaying his return to the United States so he could take part in the presentation. Arturo Garcia, a movie theater manager in Davao, had bought the bird in March 1970 after the hunting incident, and built a large cage for it behind his house. Lindbergh entered the cage with Jesus Alvarez, director of the Philippines park and wildlife commission, received the eagle, and then turned it over to Alvarez, remarking: "Now we have to see if the bird can go back to its natural place." The Associated Press reported on both Lindbergh's reception of the Order of the Golden Heart and the presentation of the eagle.

==== 1972 Philippines expedition ====
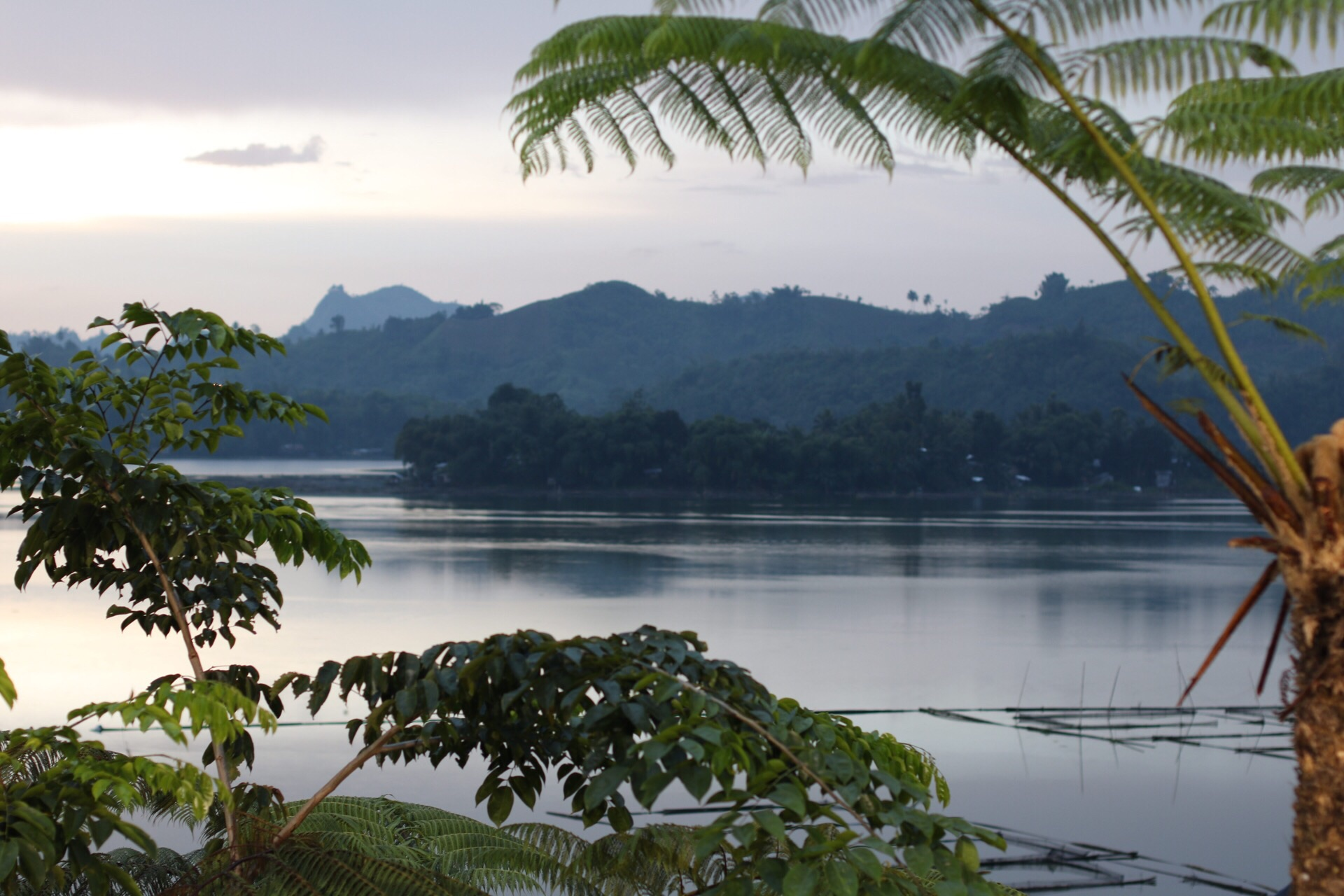
Lake Sebu on Mindanao, near where Lindbergh made his 1972 trip to investigate the Tasaday people

Lindbergh's speeches and writings in later life centered on technology and nature, and his lifelong belief that "all the achievements of mankind have value only to the extent that they preserve and improve the quality of life". In 1972, Lindbergh undertook an expedition with a television news crew to Mindanao, in the Philippines, to investigate reports of a lost tribe. The Tasaday, a Philippine indigenous people of the Lake Sebu area, were attracting much media attention at the time. Although both NBC Evening News and National Geographic ran stories about the supposed discovery of the tribe, a controversy emerged over whether the Tasaday were truly uncontacted, or had just been portrayed that way for media attention—particularly by Manuel Elizalde Jr., a Philippine politician who publicized the tribe—and were in reality "not completely isolated."

Lindbergh cooperated with Elizalde to get a "proclamation from President Ferdinand Marcos to preserve more than 46,000 acres of Tasaday country." However, during Lindbergh's 1972 expedition, the support helicopter for his team had mechanical trouble, creating the prospect of a three-day return trek through difficult jungle terrain. On April 2, The New York Times ran a UPI report stating Lindbergh's party had "sent a radio message from the rain forests of the southern Philippines saying their food was nearly gone and they needed help." Henry A. Byroade, U.S. Ambassador to the Philippines, called upon the 31st Aerospace Rescue and Recovery Squadron at Clark Air Base on the island of Luzon to perform a rescue.

U.S. Air Force Maj. Bruce Ware and his crew—co-pilot Lt. Col. Dick Smith, flight engineer SSgt Bob Baldwin, and pararescueman Airman 1st Class Kim Robinson—flew their Sikorsky HH-3E Jolly Green Giant over 600 miles (970 km) to rescue Lindbergh and his news crew on April 12, 1972. Lindbergh and the news team were stranded on a 3,000-foot (910 m) high jungle ridge line, and because of this terrain the Sikorsky "had to hover with the nose wheel on one side of the ridge, and the main wheels on the other, with the boarding steps a few feet over the ridge top." During the operation, the helicopter had to refuel twice, prompting Lindbergh to comment that although he had helped develop in-flight refueling, he had never been aboard a helicopter during the procedure, nor on the receiving end of it.

After more than twelve hours, and a total of eight trips to a nearby drop point, the mission was completed, and all 46 individuals stranded on the ridge were extracted. With Lindbergh aboard, the helicopter then flew to Mactan Air Base, on the island of Cebu, where photographers were waiting for him. Ware rested in the pilot's seat for several minutes after landing, and Lindbergh was hesitant to disembark before him. He told Ware he was certain he could not have made the "hard" three-day journey back. Lindbergh, with other passengers, was then loaded on a HC-130 and flown to Manila. As reported by the Associated Press, Lindbergh remarked after his rescue: "We were in no danger but we were stranded and running low on food."

Maj. Ware received the Distinguished Flying Cross for his actions, and the other Sikorsky crew members received the Air Medal. In 2021, Ware described how he received his medal "in less than a week", remarking that it normally "takes several months. But when you've got an international hero, it kind of gains some momentum.”

==== Retirement in Hawaii ====
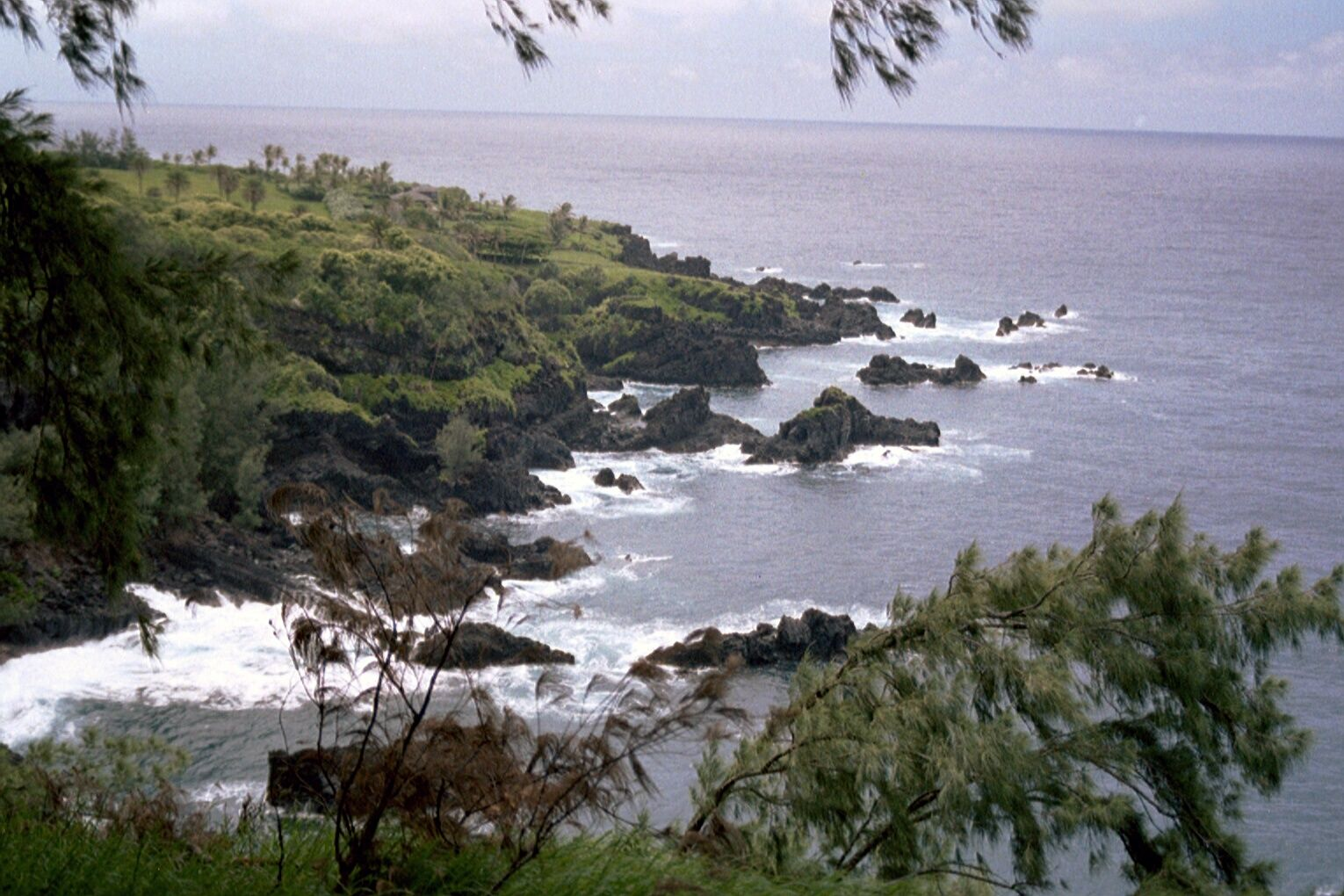
The Maui coastline near Lindbergh's retirement home in Kipahulu, where he supported conservation efforts during his later years

Lindbergh joined with early aviation industrialist, former Pan Am executive vice president, and longtime friend, Samuel F. Pryor Jr., in "efforts by the Nature Conservancy to preserve plants and wildlife in Kipahulu Valley" on the Hawaiian island of Maui. Lindbergh chose the Kipahulu Valley for retirement, building an A-frame cottage there in 1971; Pryor moved there in 1965 with his wife, Mary, after retiring from Pan Am. Lindbergh's choice of Maui as a retirement home "represented his love of natural places" and his "lifelong commitment to the ideal of simplicity."

==== Views on technology ====
Commenting on Lindbergh's profound concern with the impact of technology on humanity, Richard Hallion wrote: "He recognized the narrow margin on which society trod in the unstable nuclear era, and his work after World War II confirmed his fear that humanity now had the ability to destroy in minutes what previous generations had taken centuries to create. And so Lindbergh the technologist changed to Lindbergh the philosopher, protector of the Tasaday, preaching a turn from the materialistic, mechanistic society toward a society based on 'simplicity, humiliation, contemplation, prayer.'" In her 1988 book, Charles A. Lindbergh and the American Dilemma, Susan M. Gray wrote that Lindbergh "established his 'middle ground' between technology and human values, embracing both, rejecting neither."

=== Death ===
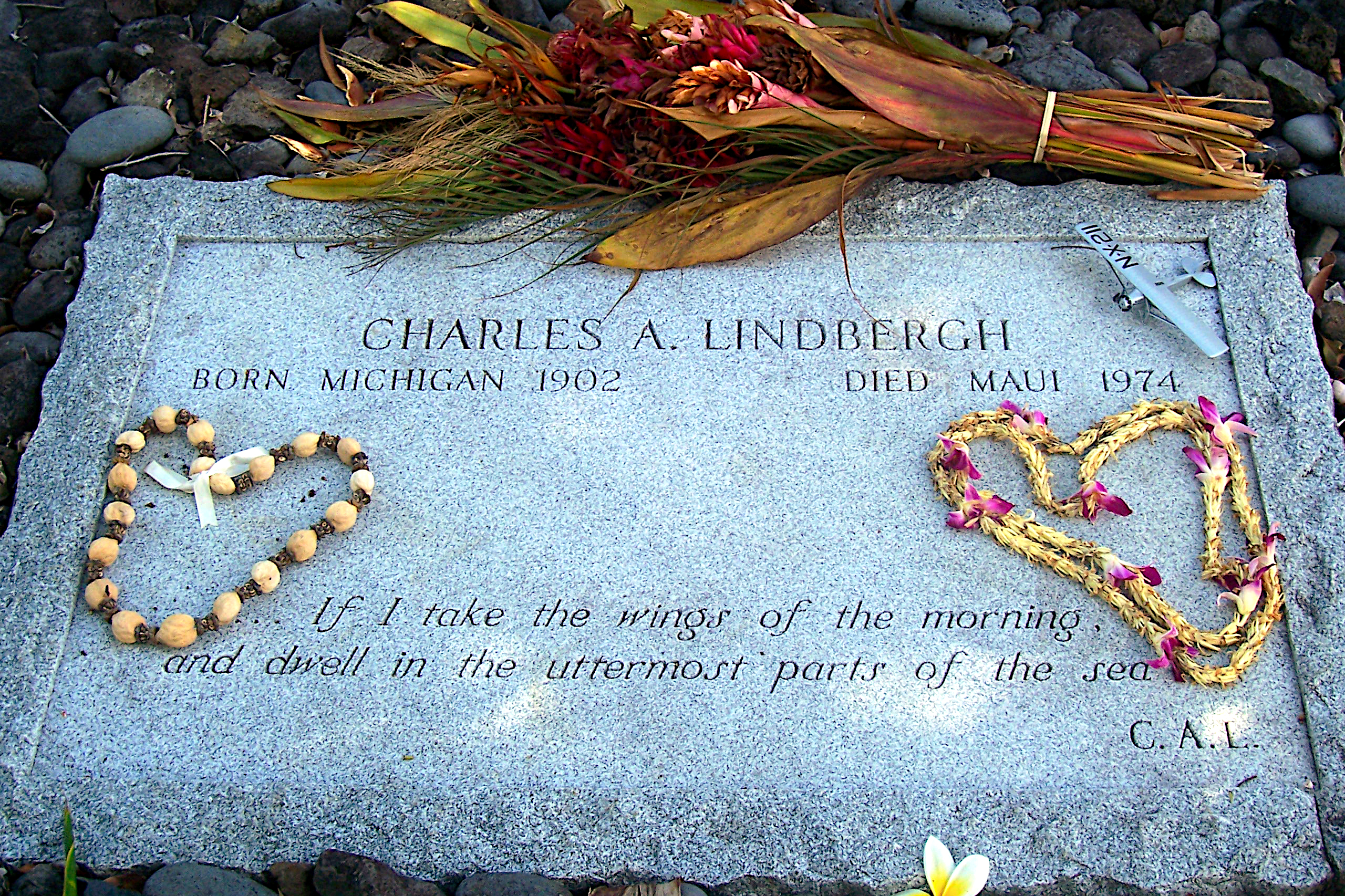
Lindbergh's grave at Palapala Ho'omau Church in Kipahulu, Hawaii

Lindbergh spent his last years on Maui in his small, rustic seaside home. In 1972, he became sick with lymphoma and ultimately died on the morning of August 26, 1974, at age 72. After his cancer diagnosis, Lindbergh "sketched a simple design for his grave and coffin", helping to design his grave in the "traditional Hawaiian style." Following "a series of radiation treatments, he spent several months in Maui recuperating", and also made a 26-day stay in the Columbia-Presbyterian Medical Center in New York, but with little improvement.

After he realized the treatment would not save him, he decided to leave the hospital in New York and returned to Kipahulu with his wife Anne, flying to Honolulu on August 17 and then traveling to Maui by small plane, dying a week later. He was buried on the grounds of the Palapala Ho'omau Church in Kipahulu, Maui, a Congregational church first established in 1864, which fell into disuse in the 1940s and was restored beginning in 1964 by Samuel F. Pryor Jr., whose family cooperated with the Lindbergh family to create an endowment for the upkeep of the property. Lindbergh took part in the church restoration with his old friend Pryor, and both men agreed to make their final resting place in the small cemetery they cleared.

On the evening of August 26, Gerald Ford made a tribute to Lindbergh, saying that the courage and daring of his Atlantic flight would never be forgotten, describing him as a selfless, sincere man, and stating: "For a generation of Americans, and for millions of other people around the world, the 'Lone Eagle' represented all that was best in our country."

== Honors and tributes ==
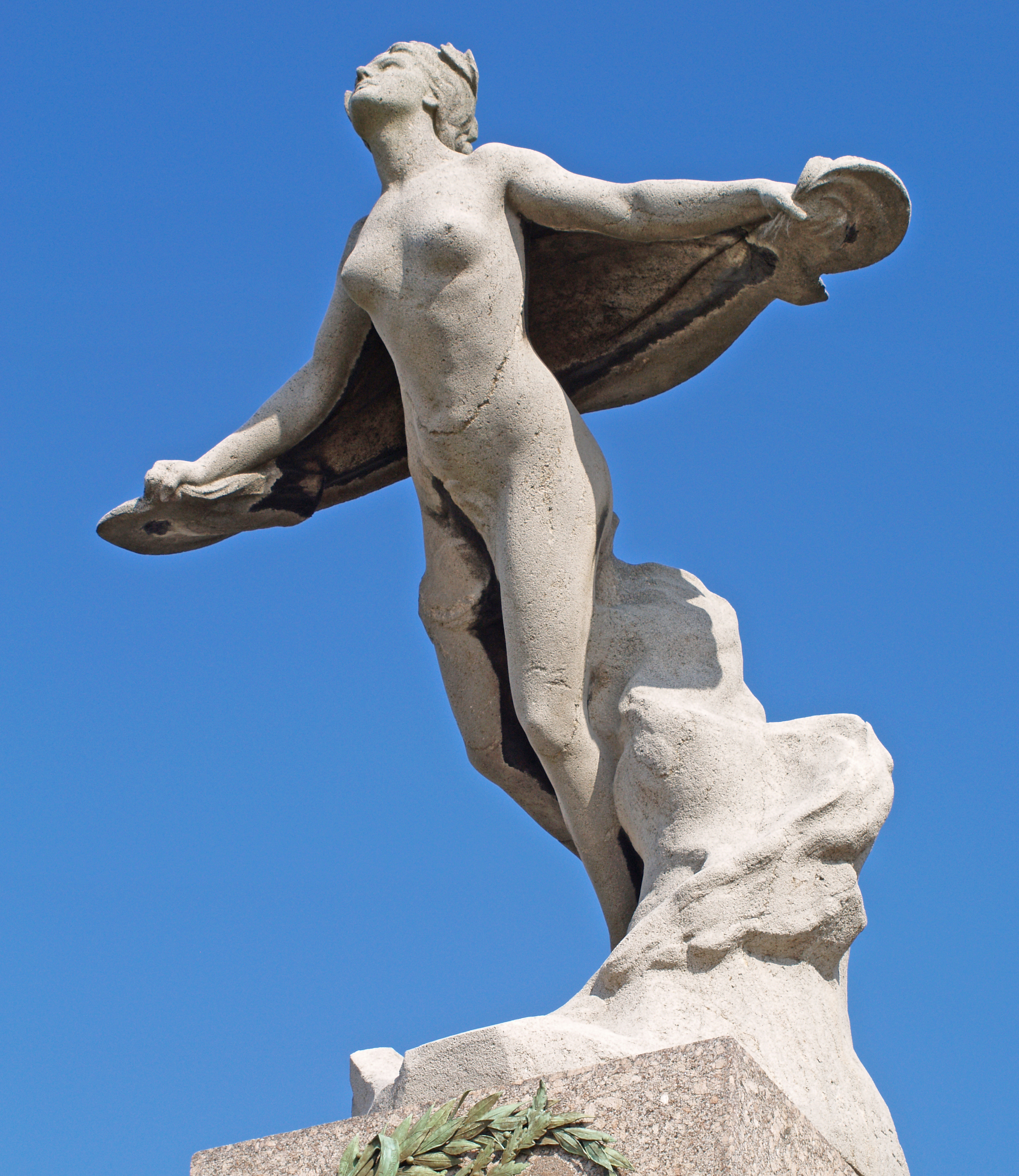
Statue in honor of Coli, Nungesser, and Lindbergh at Paris–Le Bourget Airport

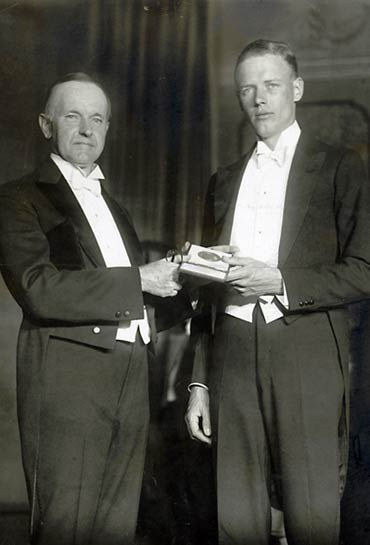
President Calvin Coolidge presents Lindbergh with a Hubbard Medal, 1928

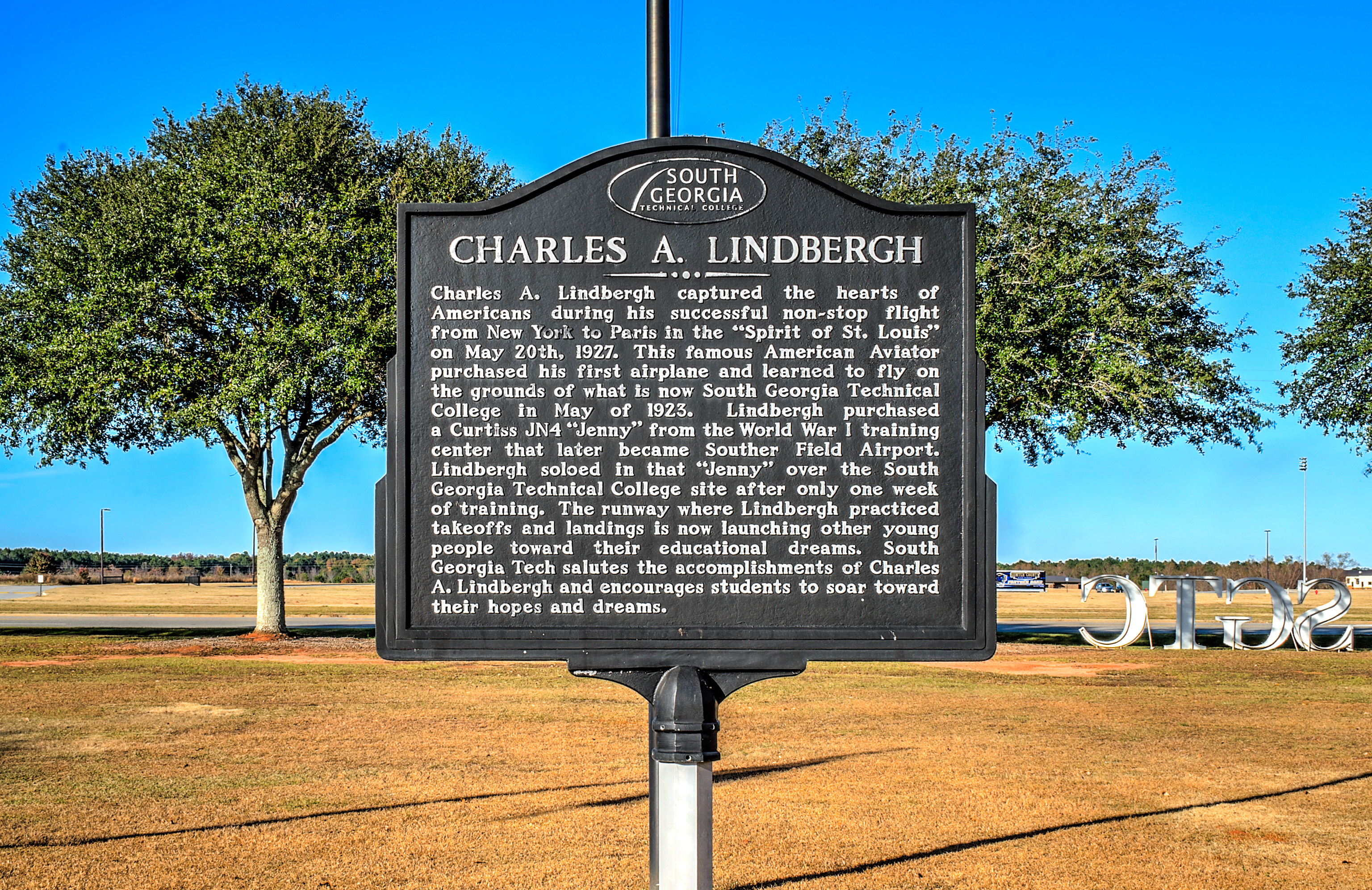
Historical marker at South Georgia Technical College

- Lindbergh was a recipient of the Silver Buffalo Award, the highest adult award given by the Boy Scouts of America, on April 10, 1928.
- On May 8, 1928, a statue was dedicated at Le Bourget Airport in Paris honoring Lindbergh and his New York to Paris flight as well as Charles Nungesser and François Coli who had disappeared while attempted the same feat two weeks earlier in the other direction aboard L'Oiseau Blanc (The White Bird).
- San Diego International Airport was named Lindbergh Field from 1928 to 2003. A replica of his plane hangs above baggage claim.
- Minneapolis–Saint Paul International Airport Terminal 1 was named Lindbergh honoring his Minnesota roots and feats in aviation.
- In 1933, the Lindbergh Range (Danish: Lindbergh Fjelde) in Greenland was named after him by Danish Arctic explorer Lauge Koch following aerial surveys made during the 1931–1934 Three-year Expedition to East Greenland.
- In St. Louis County, Missouri, a school district, high school and highway are named for Lindbergh, and he has a star on the St. Louis Walk of Fame.
- In 1937, a transatlantic race was proposed to commemorate the tenth anniversary of Lindbergh's flight to Paris, though it was eventually modified to take a different course of similar length. See 1937 Istres–Damascus–Paris Air Race.
- He was inducted into the National Aviation Hall of Fame in 1967.
- The Royal Air Force Museum in London minted a medal with his image as part of a 50 medal set called The History of Man in Flight in 1972.
- The original Lindbergh residence in Little Falls, Minnesota, is maintained as a museum, and is listed as a National Historic Landmark.
- In February 2002, the Medical University of South Carolina at Charleston, within the celebrations for the Lindbergh 100th birthday established the Lindbergh-Carrel Prize, given to major contributors to "development of perfusion and bioreactor technologies for organ preservation and growth". M. E. DeBakey and nine other scientists received the prize, a bronze statuette expressly created for the event by the Italian artist C. Zoli and named "Elisabeth", after Elisabeth Morrow, sister of Lindbergh's wife Anne Morrow, who died as a result of heart disease. Lindbergh was disappointed that contemporary medical technology could not provide an artificial heart pump that would allow for heart surgery on Elisabeth and that led to the first contact between Carrel and Lindbergh.

=== Awards and decorations ===
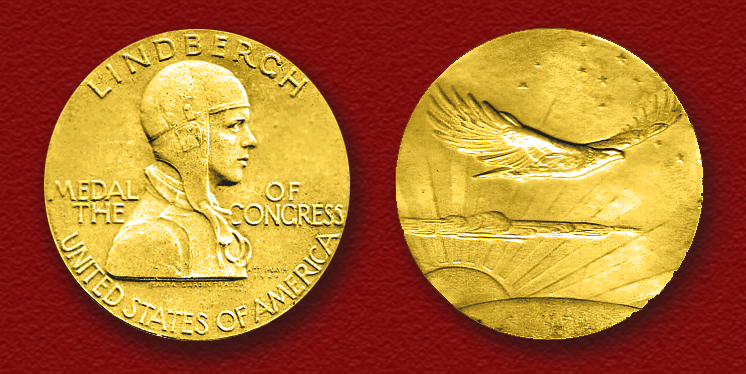
The Congressional Gold Medal presented in 1930 to Lindbergh by President Herbert Hoover

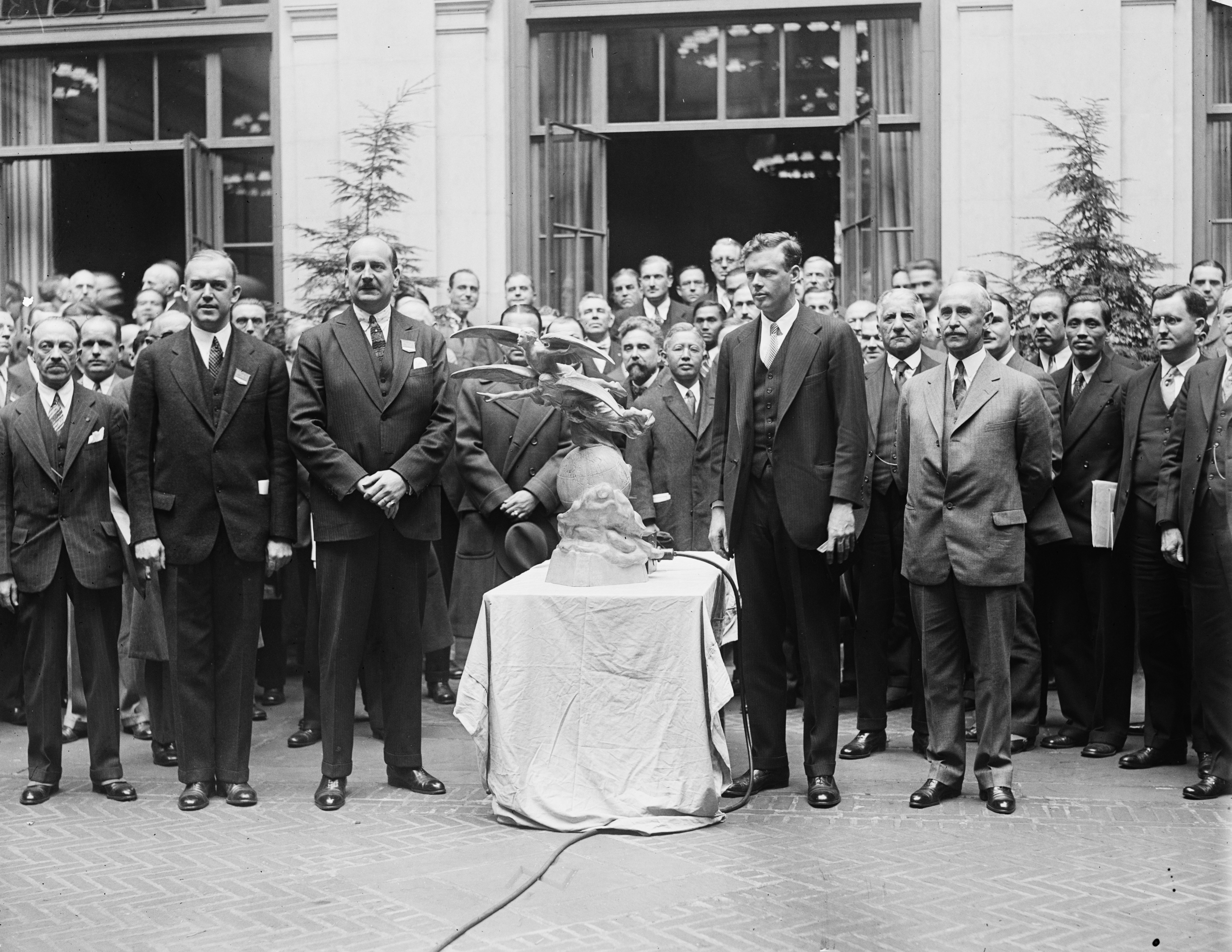
Lindbergh receiving the Harmon Trophy on December 13, 1928, at the International Civil Aeronautics Conference in Washington, D.C. He was escorted to the platform by Orville Wright, standing at Lindbergh's left.

Lindbergh received many awards, medals and decorations, most of which were later donated to the Missouri Historical Society and are on display at the Jefferson Memorial, now part of the Missouri History Museum in Forest Park in St. Louis, Missouri.

United States government

- Medal of Honor (December 14, 1927)
- Distinguished Flying Cross (June 11, 1927)
- Langley Gold Medal from the Smithsonian Institution (1927)
- Congressional Gold Medal (Approved May 4, 1928, presented August 15, 1930)

Other U.S. awards

- Orteig Prize (1927, see details above)
- Harmon Trophy (1927)
- Hubbard Medal (1927)
- Honorary Scout (Boy Scouts of America, 1927)
- New York State Medal for Valor (June 13, 1927)
- Silver Buffalo Award (Boy Scouts of America, 1928)
- Wright Brothers Memorial Trophy (1949)
- Daniel Guggenheim Medal (1953)
- Pulitzer Prize (1954)

Non-U.S. awards

- Commander of the Legion of Honor (France, initial award May 23, 1927, promoted to Commandeur October 25, 1930)
- Knight of the Order of Leopold (Belgium, May 28, 1927)
- Air Force Cross (United Kingdom, May 31, 1927)
- Silver Cross of Boyacá (Colombia, January 28, 1928)
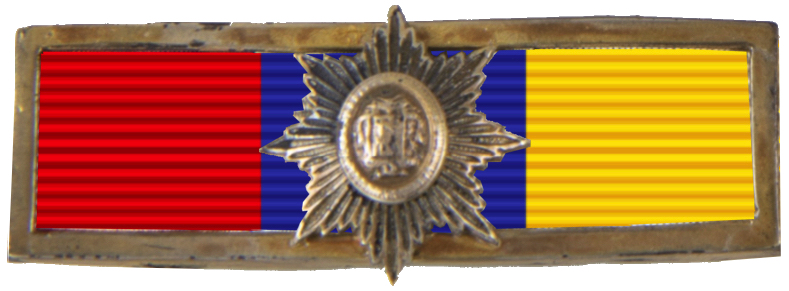
- Order of the Liberator, Commander (Venezuela, January 29, 1928)
- Order of Carlos Manuel de Céspedes, Grand Cross (Cuba, February 10, 1928)
- Order of the Rising Sun, Third Class (Japan, September 9, 1931)
- Aeronautical Virtue Order (Romania, January 13, 1933)
- Order of the German Eagle with Star (Nazi Germany, October 19, 1938)
- Gold Medal "Plus Ultra" (Spain, June 1, 1927)
- Order of the Golden Heart (Philippines, May 14, 1971)
- Fédération Aéronautique Internationale FAI Gold Medal (1927)
- ICAO Edward Warner Award (1975)
- Royal Swedish Aero Clubs Gold plaque (1927)

=== Medal of Honor ===
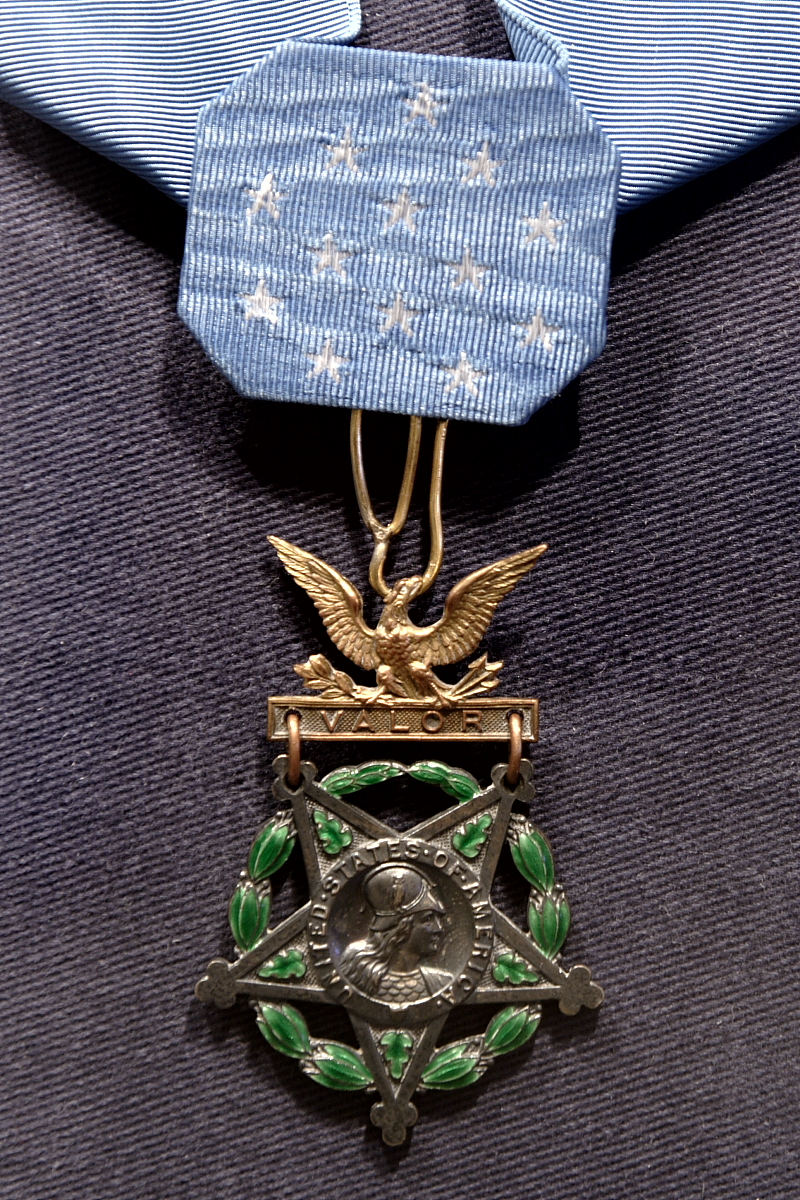
Lindbergh's Medal of Honor

Rank and organization: Captain, U.S. Army Air Corps Reserve. Place and date: From New York City to Paris, France, May 20–21, 1927. Entered service at: Little Falls, Minn. Born: February 4, 1902, Detroit, Mich. G.O. No.: 5, W.D., 1928; Act of Congress December 14, 1927. (Note: In 1927, the Medal of Honor could still be awarded for extraordinarily heroic non-combat actions by active or reserve service members made during peacetime with almost all such medals being awarded to active-duty members of the United States Navy for rescuing or attempting to rescue persons from drowning. In addition to Lindbergh, Floyd Bennett and Richard E. Byrd of the Navy were also presented with the medal for their accomplishments as explorers for their participation in the first successful heavier-than-air flight to the North Pole and back.)

Citation

For displaying heroic courage and skill as a navigator, at the risk of his life, by his nonstop flight in his airplane, the "Spirit of St. Louis", from New York City to Paris, France, 20–21 May 1927, by which Capt. Lindbergh not only achieved the greatest individual triumph of any American citizen but demonstrated that travel across the ocean by aircraft was possible.

=== Other recognition ===
- 1934–1939 Trustee of the Carnegie Institution
- 1965 International Aerospace Hall of Fame Inductee
- 1991 Scandinavian-American Hall of Fame Inductee
- Ranked No. 3 on Flying magazine's 51 Heroes of Aviation
- Member of the Independent Order of Odd Fellows

== Writings ==
In addition to "WE" and The Spirit of St. Louis, Lindbergh wrote prolifically over the years on other topics, including science, technology, nationalism, war, materialism, and values. Included among those writings were five other books: The Culture of Organs (with Dr. Alexis Carrel) (1938), Of Flight and Life (1948), The Wartime Journals of Charles A. Lindbergh (1970), Boyhood on the Upper Mississippi (1972), and his unfinished Autobiography of Values (posthumous, 1978).

== In popular culture ==
=== Literature ===
In addition to many biographies, such as A. Scott Berg's 1998 award-winning bestseller Lindbergh, Lindbergh also influenced or was the model for characters in a variety of works of fiction. Shortly after he made his famous flight, the Stratemeyer Syndicate began publishing a series of books for juvenile readers called the Ted Scott Flying Stories (1927–1943), which were written by a number of authors using the nom de plume "Franklin W. Dixon", in which the pilot hero was closely modeled after Lindbergh. Ted Scott duplicated the solo flight to Paris in the series' first volume, Over the Ocean to Paris (1927). Another reference to Lindbergh appears in the Agatha Christie novel Murder on the Orient Express (1934) and the subsequent adaptations, which connects the plot with a fictionalized depiction of the Lindbergh kidnapping.

There have been several alternate history novels depicting Lindbergh's alleged Nazi-sympathies and non-interventionist views during the first half of World War II. In Daniel Easterman's K is for Killing (1997), a fictional Lindbergh becomes president of a fascist United States. The Philip Roth novel The Plot Against America (2004) explores an alternative history where Franklin Delano Roosevelt is defeated in the 1940 presidential election by Lindbergh, who allies the United States with Nazi Germany.

The Robert Harris novel Fatherland (1992) explores an alternative history where the Nazis won the war, the United States still defeats Japan, Adolf Hitler and President Joseph Kennedy negotiate peace terms, and Lindbergh is the US Ambassador to Germany. The Jo Walton novel Farthing (2006) explores an alternate history where the United Kingdom made peace with Nazi Germany in 1941, Japan never attacked Pearl Harbor, thus the United States never got involved with the war, and Lindbergh is president and is seeking closer economic ties with the Greater East Asian Co-Prosperity Sphere.

In Back in the USSA by Eugene Byrne and Kim Newman (1997) has Lindbergh as one of the Revolutionary Fraternity Squadron, flying heroes making propaganda visits across the USSA. Lindbergh is consistently portrayed as one of the more honourable members of the Squadron.

=== Film and television ===
- Lindbergh has been the subject of numerous documentary films, including Charles A. Lindbergh (1927), a UK documentary by De Forest Phonofilm; 40,000 Miles with Lindbergh (1928), featuring Lindbergh himself; and The American Experience‍—‌Lindbergh: The Shocking, Turbulent Life of America's Lone Eagle (1988).
- The 1942 MGM picture Keeper of the Flame, starring Katharine Hepburn and Spencer Tracy, features Hepburn as the widow of a "Lindbergh-like" national hero.
- In the major motion picture The Spirit of St. Louis (1957), directed by Billy Wilder, Lindbergh was played by James Stewart, an admirer of Lindbergh and himself a World War II aviator. The film largely centers on Lindbergh's record-breaking 1927 flight. Prior to the casting of Stewart, John Kerr declined to play the role because of Lindbergh's alleged pro-Nazi beliefs.
- In 1976, Buzz Kulik's TV movie The Lindbergh Kidnapping Case, with Cliff DeYoung as Lindbergh and Anthony Hopkins as Richard Hauptmann, premiered on NBC.
- Lindbergh was the theme of prolific director Orson Welles's final living film project in 1984, The Spirit of Charles Lindbergh, where Welles speaks of the human spirit while quoting Lindbergh's journal. Although never intended to be viewed by the public, a brief clip can be seen at the end of Vassili Slovic's 1995 documentary Orson Welles: the One-Man Band.
- The 2020 HBO alternate history miniseries The Plot Against America, based on the Philip Roth book of the same name, features actor Ben Cole as a fictionalized President Lindbergh following his defeat of Roosevelt in 1940. The series portrays Lindbergh as a xenophobic populist with strong ties to Nazi Germany.
- Charles Lindbergh "Chuck" McGill, a fictional character in the TV series Better Call Saul (2015–2022), was named after Lindbergh.

=== Music ===
Within days of the flight, dozens of Tin Pan Alley publishers rushed a variety of popular songs into print celebrating Lindbergh and the Spirit of St. Louis including "Lindbergh (The Eagle of the U.S.A.)" by Howard Johnson and Al Sherman, and "Lucky Lindy!" by L. Wolfe Gilbert and Abel Baer. In the two-year period following Lindbergh's flight, the U.S. Copyright Office recorded three hundred applications for Lindbergh songs. Tony Randall revived "Lucky Lindy" in an album of Jazz Age and Depression-era songs that he recorded titled Vo Vo De Oh Doe (1967).

While the exact origin of the name of the Lindy Hop is disputed, it is widely acknowledged that Lindbergh's 1927 flight helped to popularize the dance: soon after "Lucky Lindy" "hopped" the Atlantic, the Lindy Hop became a trendy, fashionable dance, and songs referring to the "Lindbergh Hop" were quickly released.

In 1929, Bertolt Brecht wrote a cantata called Der Lindberghflug (Lindbergh's Flight) with music by Kurt Weill and Paul Hindemith. Because of Lindbergh's apparent Nazi sympathies, in 1950 Brecht removed all direct references to Lindbergh and renamed the piece Der Ozeanflug (The Flight Across the Ocean).

In the early 1940s Woody Guthrie wrote "Lindbergh" or "Mister Charlie Lindbergh" which criticizes Lindbergh's involvement with the America First Committee and his suspected sympathy for Nazi Germany.

=== Postage stamps ===
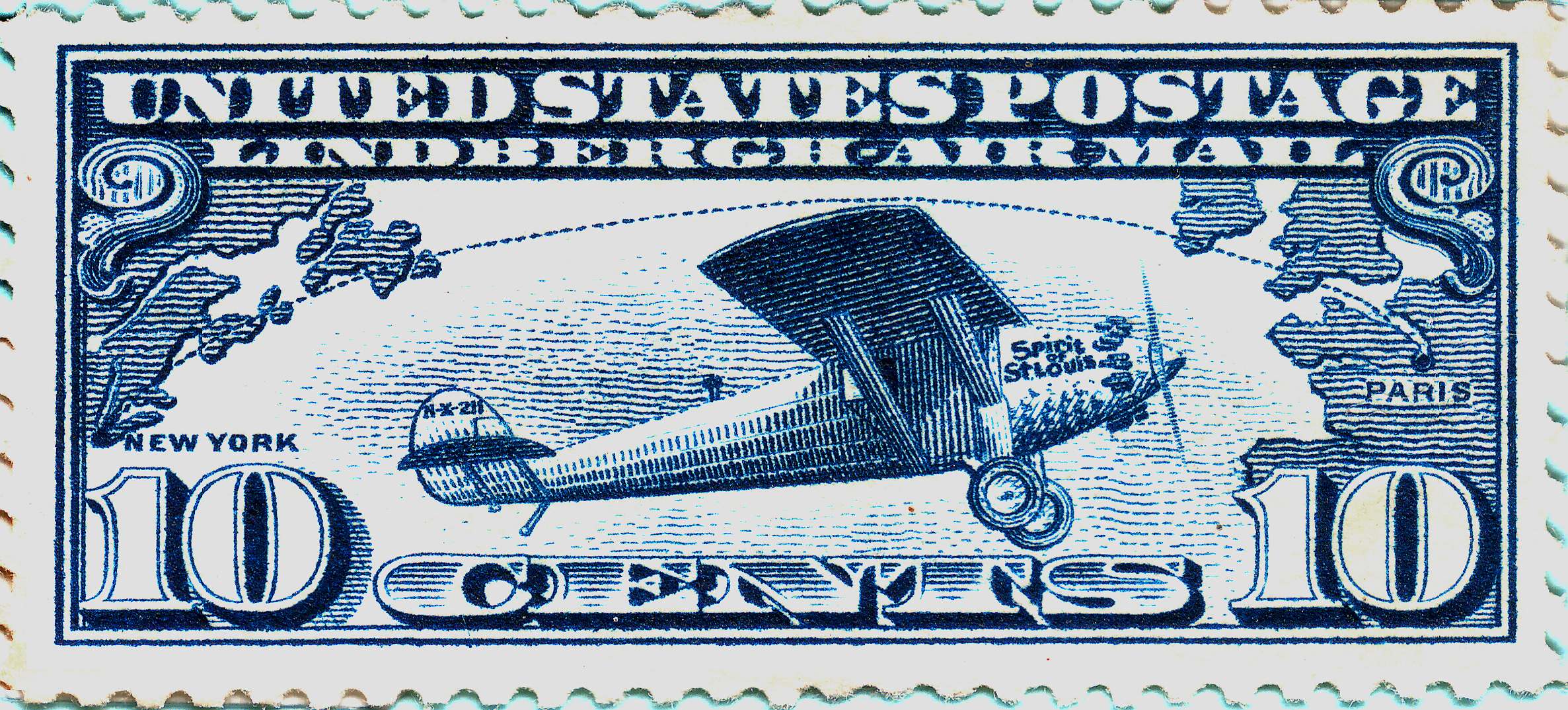
Lindbergh made numerous flights in the Spirit of Saint Louis which was depicted on a 10¢ U.S. Air Mail stamp, issue of June 11, 1927 (C-10)

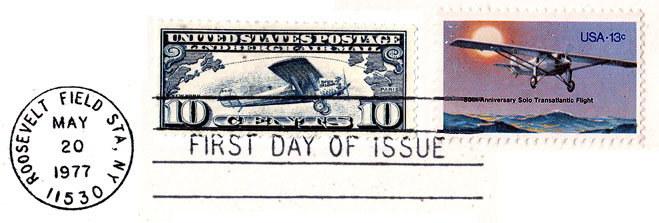
Scott C-10 and #1710 with May 20, 1977 First Day of Issue CDS

Lindbergh and the Spirit have been honored by a variety of world postage stamps over the last eight decades, including three issued by the United States. Less than three weeks after the flight the U.S. Post Office Department issued a 10-cent "Lindbergh Air Mail" stamp on June 11, 1927, with engraved illustrations of both the Spirit of St. Louis and a map of its route from New York to Paris. This was also the first U.S. stamp to bear the name of a living person. A 13-cent commemorative stamp depicting the Spirit over the Atlantic Ocean was issued on May 20, 1977, the 50th anniversary of the flight from Roosevelt Field. On May 28, 1998, a 32¢ stamp with the legend "Lindbergh Flies Atlantic" depicting Lindbergh and the Spirit was issued as part of the Celebrate the Century stamp sheet series.

=== Other ===
During World War II, Lindbergh was a frequent target of Dr. Seuss's first political cartoons, published in the New York magazine PM, in which Seuss criticized Lindbergh's isolationism, antisemitism, and supposed Nazi sympathies.

Lindbergh's Spirit of St. Louis is featured in the opening sequence of Star Trek: Enterprise (2001–2005).

St. Louis area–based GoJet Airlines uses the callsign "Lindbergh" after Charles Lindbergh.

The aeronautical themed Hotel Charles Lindbergh at German theme park Phantasialand was named after Lindbergh.

== See also ==
- Amelia Earhart
- History of aviation
- List of firsts in aviation
- List of Medal of Honor recipients in non-combat incidents
- List of peace activists
- Uncommon Friends of the 20th Century (1999 documentary)
