= Mabel Boll =

American socialite and aviator (1893–1949)

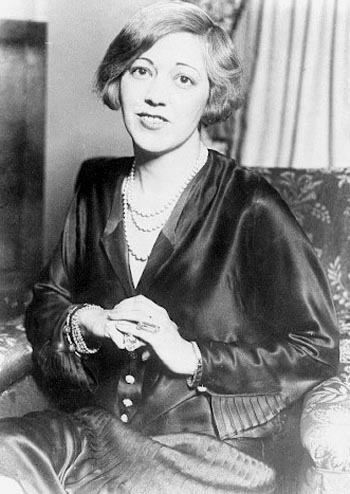
- Boll circa 1920
- Born: December 1, 1893; Rochester, New York
- Died: April 11, 1949 (aged 55); Manhattan State Hospital; Wards Island, Manhattan, New York City
- Resting place: Holy Sepulchre Cemetery; Rochester, New York
- Other names: "Queen of Diamonds", Mabel Boll Cella, Countess de Porcerie, Senora Hernando Rocha-Schioos
- Citizenship: American
- Occupation: Actress
- Known for: Actress, aviation pioneer, jewelry
- Spouses: Robert Scott I (m. 1909–1917) Hernando Rocha (m. 1922–1930) Count Henri de Porceri (m. 1931–1933) Theodore Cella (m. 1940–1949)
- Children: Robert Scott II (1914-1942)
- Parent(s): George L. Boll; Josephine Snelgrove

Mabel Boll (December 1, 1893 – April 11, 1949), known as the "Queen of Diamonds", was an American socialite involved in the early days of record-setting airplane flights in the 1920s. She garnered nicknames from the press, including "Broadway’s most beautiful blonde" and the "$250,000-a-day bride".

== Early life ==
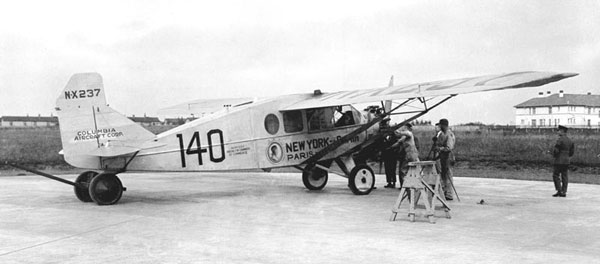
The Columbia

Boll made many claims later in life that she was an heiress and was a member of a wealthy family. The truth was that her father, George, was a bartender in Rochester, New York. She was, however, attractive, a short, dark-eyed, and "vividly blonde" beauty. Her early employment was selling cigars in Rochester. Boll became an experienced horse rider, and married businessman Robert Scott in 1909. In 1914 she had a son, Robert Scott II.

Boll was known as "The Queen of Diamonds" because of the amount of jewelry she publicly displayed. At times, she would wear over $400,000 in jewelry in public and was photographed wearing a sweater made of gold and platinum.

In 1922, Boll married Colombian coffee king Hernando Rocha, who presented her with over a million dollars in jewels and a 46.57-carat (9.314 g) emerald-cut diamond bearing her name "The Mabel Boll". The diamond was purchased by the Harry Winston collection upon Boll's death in 1949.

In 1934, Boll made headlines again as the "Countess de Porceri" in Nice, France, when her 27-year-old boyfriend Georges Chariot shot himself on her lawn. In February 1940, Boll married for the fifth time, a harp player from Florida.

According to the New York Times obituary, Boll was once known as Mabel Bache possibly marrying Lieut. Albert Bache although she never admitted to the marriage.

== Aviation ==
=== Transatlantic fever ===
1927 was full of publicity surrounding Charles Lindbergh winning the Orteig Prize for his non-stop flight from New York to Paris. Boll wanted publicity as well and felt that being the first woman to fly across the Atlantic would be headline news. While living in Paris, France, Boll announced she would pay 100,000 francs to any pilot who would fly her across the Atlantic from Paris.

=== Flights in the Columbia ===
Admiral Byrd and Charles A. Levine competed for the Orteig prize, but missed out. Each completed record flights shortly thereafter. While in Europe, Boll attempted to get Levine to fly her to America in the Columbia, which was still in France after a record-setting flight from New York. The inexperienced owner of the aircraft, Levine, had plans to fly it back to America with a French pilot, Maurice Droughin. After disagreements with Droughin and lawyers left the aircraft guarded and grounded, Levine took off to England claiming he was just testing the engine. (Chamberlain claimed that Levine bribed the guards.) Boll followed Levine to England by boat, talking Levine into letting her be a passenger.

Just before the flight, Levine's new pilot, Capt. Walter G. R. Hinchliffe, publicly refused to fly if Boll was a passenger and instead, she flew to Rome, dropping a present to Benito Mussolini's son. Boll was invited to try an east–west flight from America and she set out for New York by boat in January 1928.

On March 5, 1928, Wilmer Stultz, Oliver Colin LeBoutillier, and Boll on an improvised seat, made the first non-stop flight in the Columbia between New York City and Havana, Cuba, placing Boll on the front page of the New York Times. Boll was sued a month later by Levine's company for $12,000 plus interest. Boll was known as a temperamental passenger, once injuring pilot Erroll Boyd with an Alligator handbag in flight for making a premature landing in bad weather.

In 1928, the same teams that attempted to win the Orteig Prize were competing to be the first to fly a woman across the Atlantic (as a passenger). Levine chose the flamboyant Boll. On the other extreme, Amelia Earhart was chosen as a demure and capable pilot sponsored by George Palmer Putnam and Amy Phipps Guest.

On June 26, 1928, Boll was filmed leaving Roosevelt Field in the Columbia. Boll was later spotted 1,100 miles away in Harbour Grace, Newfoundland as a passenger in the Columbia. The aircraft was piloted by Oliver Colin LeBoutillier and Arthur Argles owned by Columbia Aircraft Corp Chairman Charles Levine. While Boll publicly announced her aspiration to be the first woman to fly across the Atlantic, Amelia Earhart was also in Newfoundland at the same time, along with the German Thea Rasche.

The newspapers focused their attention on the aspirations of “The Diamond Queen of Broadway”. Preparations for the trip were done with full publicity. At the same time in relative secrecy, pilots Wilmer Stultz and Gordon were believed by the press to be preparing Byrd's Fokker “Friendship” for his planned trip to the South Pole. Stultz himself planned to be the pilot of the Columbia and defected to Byrd's crew. After several failed attempts days earlier, on June 17, the “Friendship” took off from the bay at Trepassey, Newfoundland with Earhart on board while the crew of the Columbia were grounded for five days due to the weather. Upon learning of successful flight by Earhart and crew, Boll returned to America, donating $500 to the Newfoundland airstrip for development.

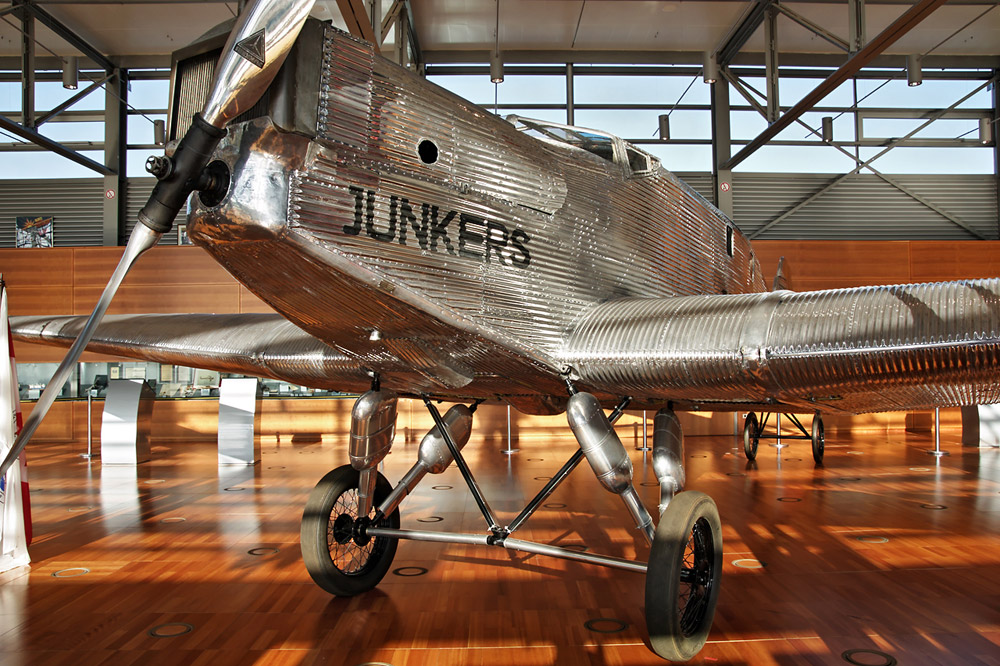
A Junkers W 33

Boll wanted a new nickname, "The Queen of the Air". For her last serious record attempt, Levine purchased a customized long-range Junkers W 33 for $50,000 emblazoned with the logo "Queen of the Air" across the sides. Plans were made for Bert Acosta to fly Boll and Levine from Paris to New York for a new record, which was changed to a London to New York attempt. By the time the aircraft arrived in late August 1928, the flying season was coming to an end and Levine was preoccupied with legal matters in the United States. "The Queen of the Air" Junkers was transported back to America, damaged, and resold to William Rody. He renamed it to the "de Espírito Santo Agostinho" (ESA) and attempted a three-man transatlantic crossing record from Lisbon on September 13, 1931. The aircraft landed in the Atlantic Ocean, and the aircraft's empty tanks kept the crew afloat for several days before they were rescued.

Boll's last effort to become a transatlantic passenger was refused by aircraft owner, and entertainer Harry Richman. Boll avoided the perils of record setting flights until 1936, when she announced she had been cured of her flying obsession.

== Later life and death ==
Boll continued to make headlines throughout the 1930s and 1940s, but gradually her star status faded. She abandoned her home in Switzerland in 1939 as war in Europe broke out. She died of a stroke at the Manhattan State Hospital, the psychiatric hospital on Wards Island on April 11, 1949, at the age of 55. (Note: Quote in The New York Times: "Mrs. Mabel Boll Cella, who wanted to be Queen of the Air when the world knew her as the Queen of Diamonds, died Sunday of a stroke in Manhattan State Hospital for the mentally ill on Wards Island.")

== Sources ==
- Bak, Richard. The Big Jump: Lindbergh and the Great Atlantic Air Race. Hoboken: John Wiley & Sons. 2011. ISBN 978-0-471-47752-5.
- Butler, Susan. East to the Dawn: The Life of Amelia Earhart. Reading, Massachusetts: Addison-Wesley, 1997. ISBN 0-306-80887-0.
- Sloate, Susan. Amelia Earhart: Challenging the Skies. New York: Fawcett Books, 1990. ISBN 978-0-449-90396-4.
- Smyth, Ross. The Lindbergh of Canada: The Erroll Boyd Story. St. Catharines, Ontario, Canada: General Store Publishing House, 1997. ISBN 978-1-89618-261-2.
