= Wright-Bellanca WB-2 =

Aircraft manufactured in 1926

WB-2 Columbia
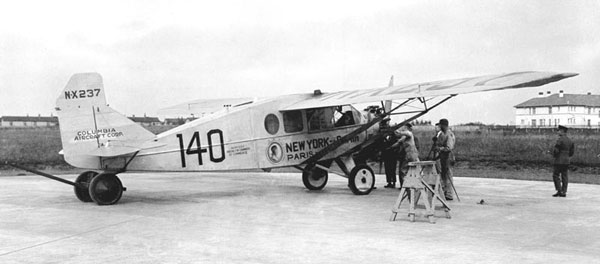
- Transatlantic flight June 4–6, 1927 from New York to Eisleben in Germany

General information
- Other names: Miss Columbia, and later Maple Leaf
- Type: Wright-Bellanca WB-2
- Manufacturer: Wright Aeronautical
- Registration: NX237

History
- Manufactured: 1926
- First flight: 1926
- Fate: Destroyed in a hangar fire in 1934

The Wright-Bellanca WB-2, was a high wing monoplane aircraft designed by Giuseppe Mario Bellanca, initially for Wright Aeronautical then later Columbia Aircraft Corp.

Based on its all-wood forerunner, the Wright-Bellanca WB-1, only one was produced, variously named Columbia, Miss Columbia, and later Maple Leaf. The WB was the second in a series of designs by Bellanca, following his prior fabric-covered all-wood CE biplane.

== Development ==
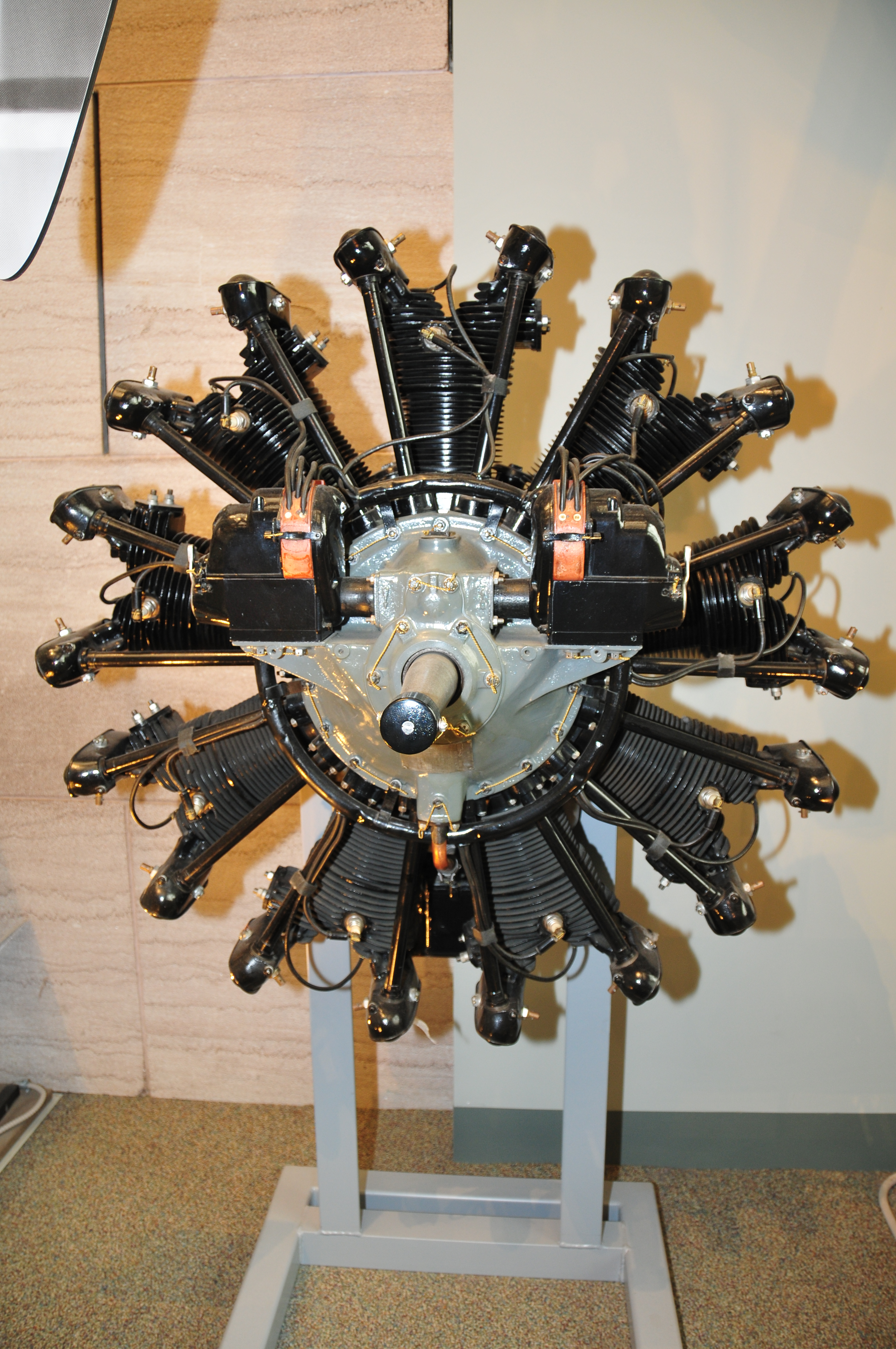
Wright-Whirlwind J-5

In 1925, Clarence Duncan Chamberlin was friends with, and worked as chief test pilot for, the aircraft designer Giuseppe Mario Bellanca. A flight instructor in World War I, Chamberlin was an early customer of Bellanca designs, purchasing the only Bellanca CE, built when he was working for the Maryland Pressed Steel Company. Through Chamberlin, Bellanca secured a position as a consultant for the Wright Aeronautical company to produce a 5–6 passenger aircraft to demonstrate their new Wright Whirlwind J-4 engine. Bellanca built an all-wood aircraft, the WB-1 in 1926, which crashed at Curtiss Field in an attempt on the world non-refueled endurance record. The WB-2 follow-on aircraft, made of fabric-covered steel tubing, was already in development to test the updated Wright Whirlwind J-5. The aircraft had some features intended for long-distance overseas flights built in. The landing gear could be dropped off, to prevent flipping in a water landing. Once on the water, the large gas tanks could provide flotation, and a saw was carried to drop the dead engine weight if needed.

== Operational history ==
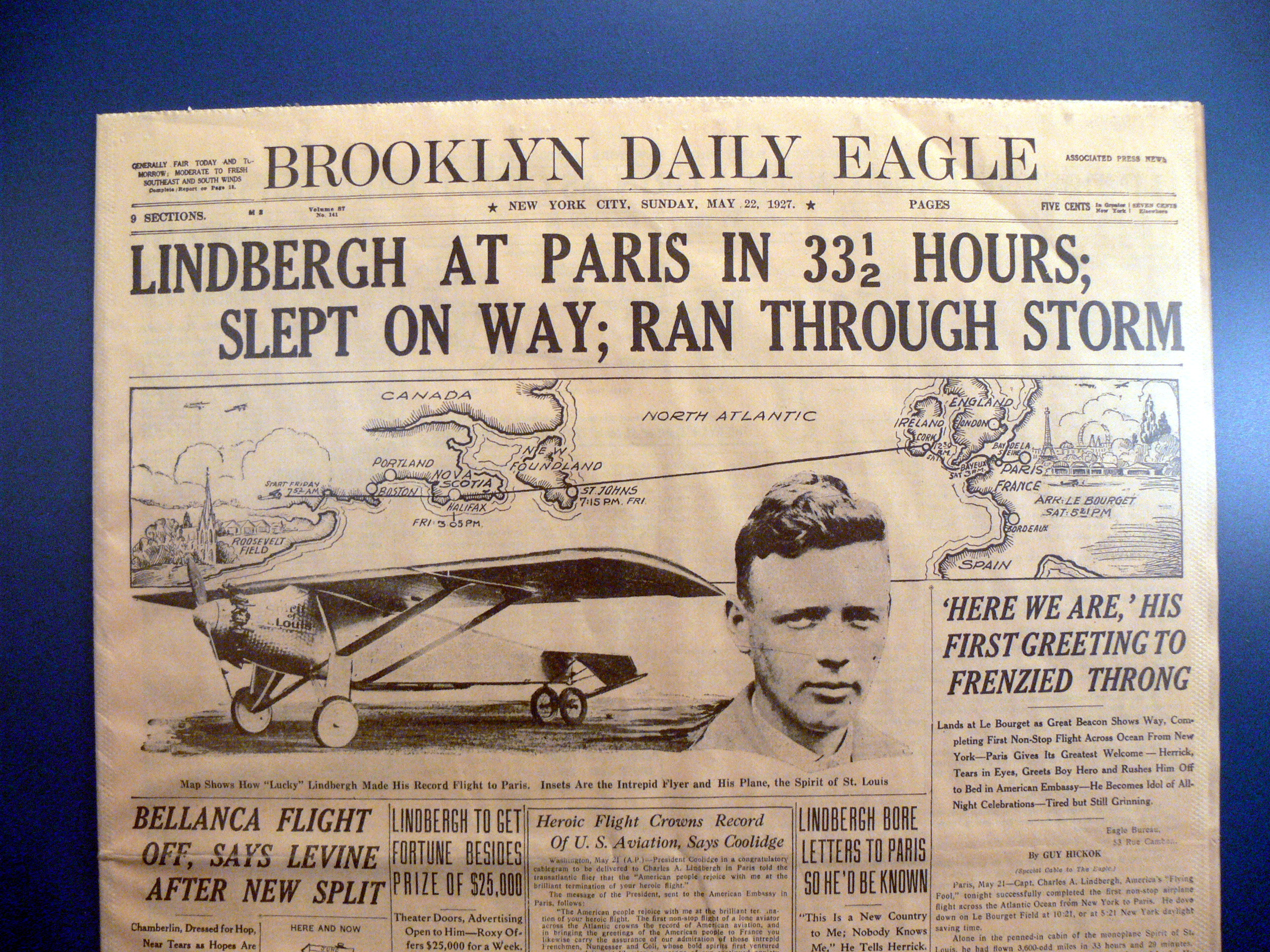
Lindbergh trumps Levine

The WB-2 Columbia was introduced at the 1926 National Air Races flown by Lieut C.C. Champion, where it won both efficiency records. Wright Aeronautical chose to continue to develop the Whirlwind engine, but discontinue aircraft operations to avoid competition in profitable engine sales with rival aircraft manufacturers. Bellanca left Wright Aeronautical, with the rights to the WB-2, and the WB-2 prototype purchased for $15,500 and formed a new interest, Columbia Aircraft Company, with the investor Charles Levine. Levine became a millionaire at the young age of 28 by reselling surplus armaments to the United States government. When partnering with Bellanca, he had plans to put the WB-2 in production. The plans never came through, and the aircraft would not see production until Bellanca manufactured an updated version later in 1928 with his own company.

- Endurance record Bellanca and Levine felt that Columbia could beat the current world record for endurance held by Maurice Drouhin and Landry Jules in France. Leigh Wade, a pilot of the 1924 round-the-world flight in a Douglas World Cruiser, was hired for publicity but soon quit in disagreements with Levine. Bert Acosta was brought on as his replacement. On April 12, 1927, Clarence Chamberlin and Bert Acosta set off on their endurance attempt. The aircraft was predicted to crash by Curtiss engineers, but took off in only 1200 feet of runway. They stayed aloft over Roosevelt field in New York City for 51 hours, 11 minutes, and 25 seconds. The estimated distance flown was 4,100 miles, which was 500 more than was needed for the Orteig Prize attempt between New York, United States and Paris, France.

Shortly after the record flight, on April 24, 1927, the WB-2 was christened in Prohibition-era ginger ale the Columbia by Levine's 8-year-old daughter. Later that day, Chamberlin safely landed the plane with two children on board with a broken landing gear.

- Missed opportunity with Lindbergh In late 1926, an enterprising Charles Lindbergh had convinced Earl Thompson, and Major Albert Bond Lambert to back him on an attempt to win the $25,000 Orteig Prize for a non-stop transatlantic flight. He specifically wanted a single pilot, and a single engine to reduce weight and chances of failure. The ideal plane was the Wright-Bellanca WB-2. Lindbergh set out by train to New York in a new suit to look professional for a face-to-face meeting with Columbia Aircraft to buy the only WB-2. In the meeting, Levine said the aircraft was worth $25,000, but would discount it to $15,000 due to the free publicity that would be made from the flight, well above the approximate $10,000 price that had been anticipated by Lindbergh and his backers. Lindbergh returned to St. Louis, and had a check signed to him personally for $15,000 and a request to name the WB-2 The Spirit of St. Louis. Lindbergh said he would have the plane back in St. Louis in a week.

The second meeting in New York was attended by Levine, Bellanca, and Chamberlin. With check in hand, Levine added a stipulation that Columbia Aircraft would select the flight crew, to which Lindbergh objected. Reminding Lindbergh that the WB-2 was the only plane that could make the flight at the time, they made him leave to reconsider and call back the next day. The terms did not change, and Lindbergh returned to St. Louis without an airplane. Lindbergh then approached Travel Air Manufacturing Company, asking for a Travel Air 5000 modified with a Wright Whirlwind motor and was declined. Lindbergh also inquired what it would cost to buy a Fokker for the attempt; he was given a quote of $100,000 for a custom trimotor, and was told that Fokker would not build a single-engine craft for a transatlantic flight. Lindbergh instead purchased a single-place aircraft from Ryan Aircraft, the Spirit of St. Louis, for $6000.

- Orteig Prize attempt Prior to the crossing, Levine planned on using Clarence Chamberlin or Bert Acosta as pilot with Lloyd W. Bertaud as copilot. The pilots were promised a settlement to their wives if they crashed, and the prize money if they completed the flight, but Levine refused to sign the document before the flight. Bertaud first objected, then later offered to purchase Columbia for himself. Levine bumped Bertaud from the copilot position, prompting an injunction preventing any Orteig record flight. Lindbergh arrived on May 5, 1927. While Chamberlin waited for the injunction to be lifted, his other competition, Admiral Byrd's team, was repairing his Fokker C-2 Trimotor, the America after a practice run crash. On May 20–21, 1927, Lindbergh left Roosevelt Field and crossed the Atlantic, while leaving the Columbia and Atlantic behind at the adjacent Curtiss Field. Bellanca publicly announced he was leaving the company. After the confirmation that Lindbergh had won the prize, Columbia was unloaded and a fire erupted from the spilled fuel. The tension between the various groups was still present, as each remaining plane could still make transatlantic records to other cities. While trying to position Columbia for another attempt at the crossing, mechanics from the American Trans-Oceanic Company (sponsor of the America, who also leased the airfield) would not allow Columbia to move without a permit from their president Grover Whalen, who could not be found. It was claimed later, that it was for everyone's safety to prevent stray aircraft on the field, Lindbergh had filled out his paperwork properly.
- First transatlantic flight of Columbia The Brooklyn chamber of commerce also offered $15,000 for a transatlantic challenge. Chamberlin was given the piloting job, and picked Bernt Balchen as his co-pilot. Balchen was unavailable, so Chamberlin's wife was offered the seat for the attempt, only to be displaced by the flight's backer, Levine. On June 4, 1927, The Columbia took off on its transatlantic flight from America to Berlin, Germany, with Charles Levine as the first passenger to cross the Atlantic in an airplane, and making Columbia the third plane to fly non-stop across the Atlantic. In an oft-repeated situation, Levine told his wife he was just going up for a test flight. His lawyer notified her by a letter of his intentions after they took off and kept going. At one point in the flight, Levine was at the controls flying at 20,000 feet without oxygen. He entered a spin, and descended to 4,000 feet before recovering. The Columbia did not reach Berlin, but landed 100 miles short in a field at Eisleben, Germany. The flight covered 3,905 miles (6,285 km) and 42 hours and 45 minutes. The trip was 315 miles (507 km) and 9 hours and 6 minutes longer than Lindbergh's transatlantic crossing
- The Queen of Diamonds While Levine in Europe, Mabel Boll "the Queen of Diamonds" attempted to get Levine to fly her to America in Columbia, which was still in France after a record setting flight from New York. The inexperienced owner of the aircraft, Levine had plans to fly it back to America with a French pilot, Maurice Drouhin. After disagreements with Droughin and Lawyers left the plane guarded and grounded. Levine took off to England claiming he was just testing the engine. Boll followed Levine to England by boat, talking Levine into letting her be a passenger. Just before the flight, Levine's new pilot Capt. Hinchliffe, publicly refused to let Boll fly along, and instead flew to Rome, Italy dropping a present to Benito Mussolini's son. Boll was invited to try an east–west flight from America, and she set out for New York by boat in January 1928.

On December 30, 1927, Bellanca left Columbia aircraft, to form Bellanca Aircraft Company, taking with him again the rights to the WB-2 series of aircraft.

- Non-stop flight to Cuba On March 5, 1928, Wilmer Stultz, O. Le Boutilier, and Mabel Boll on an improvised seat made the first non-stop flight in Columbia between New York, New York and Havana, Cuba. Mabell was soon turned down again to fly the Atlantic in Columbia by Levine. Undeterred, she publicly announced she had hired Stultz, and was going to make the attempt. Stultz abandoned the project, and Boll attempted to recruit Admiral Byrd's Fokker for the flight. She was passed over the opportunity by the much less flamboyant, and capable Amelia Earhart. Levine and Boll eventually partnered again, this time with competition.
- Another missed opportunity - first female across the Atlantic attempt On June 26, 1928, Mabel Boll was filmed leaving Roosevelt Field in the newly renamed Miss Columbia. Mabel was later spotted in Harbour Grace, Newfoundland as a passenger in Columbia, piloted by Captain Oliver C. Le Boutillier and Arthur Argles. While Boll publicly announced aspiration to be the first woman to fly across the Atlantic, Amelia Earhart was also in Newfoundland at the same time, and the German Thea Rasche. The newspapers was focused their attention on the aspirations of "the Diamond Queen of Broadway," Preparations for the trip were done with full publicity. At the same time in relative secrecy, pilots, Wilmer Stultz and Gordon, were believed by the press to be preparing Byrd's Fokker Friendship for his planned trip to the South Pole. Stultz himself was planned to be the pilot of Columbia, and defected to Byrd's crew. On June 17 Friendship took off from the bay at Trepassey, Newfoundland with Earhart on board, while the crew of Columbia were grounded for 5 days due to the weather. Upon learning of successful flight by Earhart and crew, Bolls returned to America in Columbia, donating $500 to the Newfoundland airstrip for development.

In 1929 Columbia placed second in a race from New York to California piloted by Commander John Iseman, Lieut. J Farnum.

- Bermuda Record On June 29, 1930, Columbia performed the first non-stop flight from New York to Bermuda and back. The flight dropped off mail, but there was not a suitable landing field on the island at the time. The flight was piloted by Erroll Boyd, Roger Q. Williams, and Harry P. Conner took 17 hours, 3 minutes. Williams relocated Columbia to Montreal just two days before a hangar fire destroyed Columbia Airlines' newest plane, the underperforming Uncle Sam.

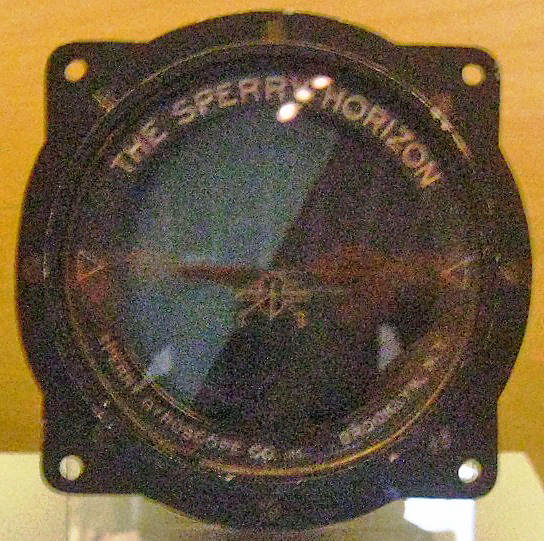
A Sperry Horizon

- Second transatlantic flight The Columbia was flown to Toronto, renamed Maple Leaf after the song "The Maple Leaf Forever". The plane was then demonstrated at the 1930 Canadian National Exhibition. The aircraft had an early Sperry Attitude indicator installed, taken out of Jimmy Doolittle's Lockheed Vega. Pilot Roger Q. Williams, held up the flight for three weeks with legal disputes with Levine over back pay. On October 9, 1930, Maple Leaf performed the first transatlantic flight by a Canadian between Canada and London, England in 36 hours, 10 minutes. The aircraft was piloted by Erroll Boyd, and Harry P. Conner, who traveled with $18 in their pockets and an unpaid Toronto Hotel bill. Upon arrival they flew a tribute flight in honor of the R-101 crash victims.
- New York to Haiti non-stop In 1933 Maple Leaf performed the first non-stop flight from New York to Haiti in 24 hours and 8 minutes. The pilots were Erroll Boyd, Robert G. Lyon, and a passenger, H.P. Davis. On June 7, 1933, Maple Leaf left Port-au-Prince, Haiti non-stop to Washington D.C., with a special-issue stamp. The aircraft was piloted by Erroll Boyd, and Robert G. Lyon.

Maple Leaf was destroyed January 25, 1934, in a hangar fire at the Bellanca factory in Newcastle, Delaware.

=== Artifacts ===
- A Bellanca CH-400 painted to resemble the WB-2 Columbia is on display at the Virginia Aviation Museum.
- The Smithsonian National Air and Space Museum has in its collection an embossed aluminum ashtray made from the metal of the fuel tanks of Columbia after the fire.
- A block of four stamps carried on the first transatlantic trip from Canada to England in Columbia was valued at $20,000 in 1995.
- An original canvas panel from the transatlantic Columbia flight to Berlin with Clarence Chamberlin and Charles Levine is on display at Allen Airways in San Diego, California, along with Chamberlain's 1927 passport and several logbooks.

== Variants ==
Wright-Bellanca WB-1
The all-wood forerunner to the WB-2, Using a Wright Whirlwind J-4
Wright-Bellanca WB-2
The record-setting Columbia, (later Maple Leaf) developed from the WB-1

== Specifications (Wright-Bellanca WB-2) ==
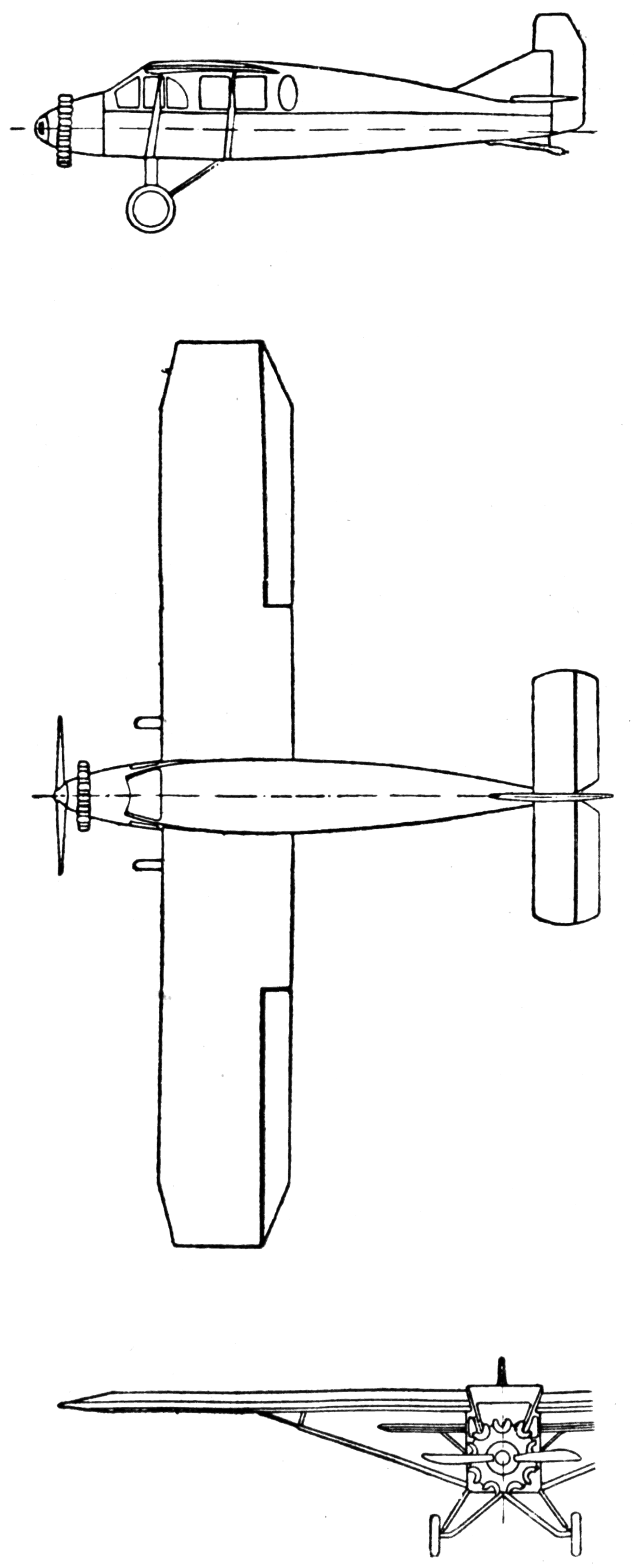
Bellanca WB-2 Columbia 3-view drawing from L'Aérophile July,1927

Data from Avistar, The Lindbergh of Canada: the Erroll Boyd story

General characteristics

- Capacity: 6
- Length: 26 ft 9 in (8.15 m)
- Upper wingspan: 46 ft 4 in (14.12 m)
- Wing area: 272 sq ft (25.3 m^{2})
- Empty weight: 1,850 lb (839 kg)
- Max takeoff weight: 5,400 lb (2,449 kg)
- Fuel capacity: 502
- Powerplant: 1 × Wright Whirlwind J-5 , 220 hp (160 kW)

Performance

- Maximum speed: 109 kn (126 mph, 203 km/h)
- Cruise speed: 91 kn (105 mph, 169 km/h)
- Service ceiling: 13,000 ft (4,000 m)
