= Charles A. Levine =

American aviation pioneer (1897–1991)

Charles Albert Levine
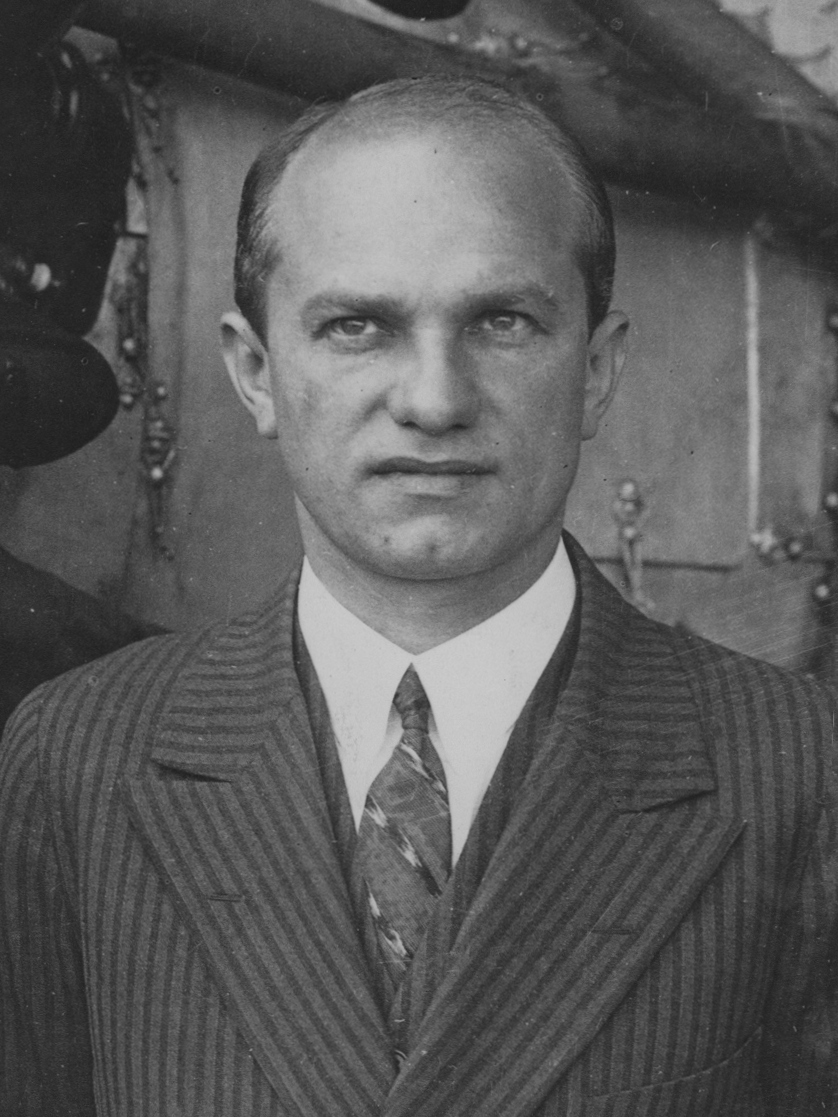
- Levine in 1930
- Born: March 17, 1897; North Adams, Massachusetts
- Died: December 6, 1991 (aged 94); Washington, D.C.
- Known for: Transatlantic Flight
- Spouse: Grace Nova Levine
- Children: Eloyse Levine; and Ardith Levine Polley

Charles Albert Levine (March 17, 1897 – December 6, 1991) was the first passenger aboard a transatlantic flight. He was ready to cross the Atlantic to claim the Orteig Prize but a court battle over who was going to be in the airplane allowed Charles Lindbergh to leave first.

== Early life ==
Levine was born on March 17, 1897, in North Adams, Massachusetts. He was born to Jewish immigrant parents—his father, Isaac Levin (or Levine), emigrated from Vilna (then in the Russian Empire) and was of Russian Jewish parentage. He joined his father in selling scrap metal, later forming his own company buying and recycling World War I surplus brass shell casings. By 1927, at age 30, he was a millionaire.

== Columbia Air Liners and the record flights ==
Levine and Giuseppe Mario Bellanca formed the Columbia Aircraft Company. Levine hired pilots Bert Acosta, Erroll Boyd, John Wycliff Isemann, Burr Leyson, and Roger Q. Williams at $200 a week to perform a series of publicity record attempts for the company.

Levine entered the competition for the Orteig Prize for the first person to complete a nonstop flight from New York to Paris. His Bellanca designed prototype aircraft, named Columbia, was ready for weeks, The co-pilot for the effort, Lloyd W. Bertaud, was displaced to accommodate Levine and went to court to be reinstated. Levine got the order lifted just hours after Charles Lindbergh, in the Spirit of St. Louis, had left Roosevelt Field on Long Island. Levine's plane was still in its hangar at the same airport. Lindbergh won the prize on May 20, 1927. The following day Levine announced that his airplane would fly farther on a $15,000 transatlantic flight challenge from America to Germany and carry a passenger. The pilot was Clarence Chamberlin, and Levine would be the passenger. In an oft-repeated ploy, Levine told his wife he was just going up for a test flight. His lawyer notified her by a letter of his intentions after they took off and kept going. On June 4, 1927, the Columbia took off on its transatlantic flight from America to Berlin, Germany with Levine as the first passenger to cross the Atlantic in an airplane. The Columbia landed 100 miles short of Berlin in a field at Eisleben, Germany. The trip was 315 miles (507 km), and 9 hours 6 minutes longer than Lindbergh's transatlantic crossing.

Levine returned to the United States in October 1927, landing in New York City on October 16 by way of the steam ship, Leviathan.

Bertaud separately vowed to complete a transatlantic flight without Levine. In September 1927, Bertaud's Hearst-financed Fokker monoplane Old Glory crashed in the Atlantic on the attempt, killing Bertaud and the other two men on the flight.

While Levine was in France following the record flight from New York, Mabel Boll "the Queen of Diamonds" tried to persuade him to fly her to America in the Columbia. Levine had plans to fly it back to America with a French pilot, Maurice Drouhin. The flight to America was cancelled. Drouhin was owed a $4,000 cancellation fee and had the Columbia guarded against leaving as a precaution. The inexperienced pilot Levine took off for England, claiming to the guards he was just testing the engine. Boll followed Levine to England by boat, talking Levine into letting her be a passenger. Just before the flight, Levine's new pilot Capt. Hinchcliffe, publicly refused to let Boll fly along. Boll was invited to try an east-west flight from America, and she set out for New York by boat in January 1928.. Before their departure, Levine and Hinchliffe appeared in a short film made at Clapham Studios in London made in the DeForest Phonofilm sound-on-film system.

In the summer of 1928 Levine purchased a customized long-range Junkers W 33 for US$50,000, emblazoned "Queen of the Air" across the sides, for Boll's nickname. Plans were made for Bert Acosta to fly Boll and Levine from Paris to New York for a new record, which was changed to a London–New York attempt. The flight was never made. "The Queen of the Air" Junkers was transported back to America, damaged, and resold to William Rody for another transatlantic attempt.

== Troubles with the law ==
After a series of bad business investments and losses in the Wall Street Crash of 1929, Levine was sued by the federal government for a half-million dollars in back taxes. In 1930, his Columbia Air Liners Inc. built the "Uncle Sam," a large aircraft having range to fly around the globe. It performed poorly, logging only twelve flights. The "Uncle Sam" and two other company planes were auctioned off in 1931 for $3000 for back hangar rent. It was destroyed days later in a hangar fire with the instruments and engine removed beforehand. Levine was already missing at the time of the auction, with a warrant for his arrest alleging he had stolen stock.

In 1930, Levine was arrested in the company of Mabel Boll for attempting to purchase dies to produce counterfeit 2-franc coins.

Levine was arrested in 1932 on a charge of violating the Workmen's Compensation Law, and he received a suspended sentence but was arrested again in 1933 on a counterfeiting charge that was later dismissed. In 1934, after his release, he was charged with illegally smuggling a German-Jewish refugee from a Nazi concentration camp into the United States and spent 150 days in jail.

In 1937 Levine was charged with smuggling 2,000 pounds of tungsten powder from Canada. He served two years in federal prison and was fined $5,000. In 1944, $209.56 was paid with the rest of the fine still owed to the court. The Assistant United States Attorney on November 18, 1958, deemed the debt to be uncollectible, and the case was closed.

== Personal life ==
In 1934, he attempted suicide using a gas range after being spurned by Boll.

He was the father of two children: Eloyse Levine and Ardith Levine Polley. He divorced their mother in 1935.

On December 6, 1991, Levine died at Sibley Memorial Hospital in Washington, D.C. age 94.

== See also ==
- Arthur Whitten Brown
- Transatlantic flight
