= Bellanca CF =

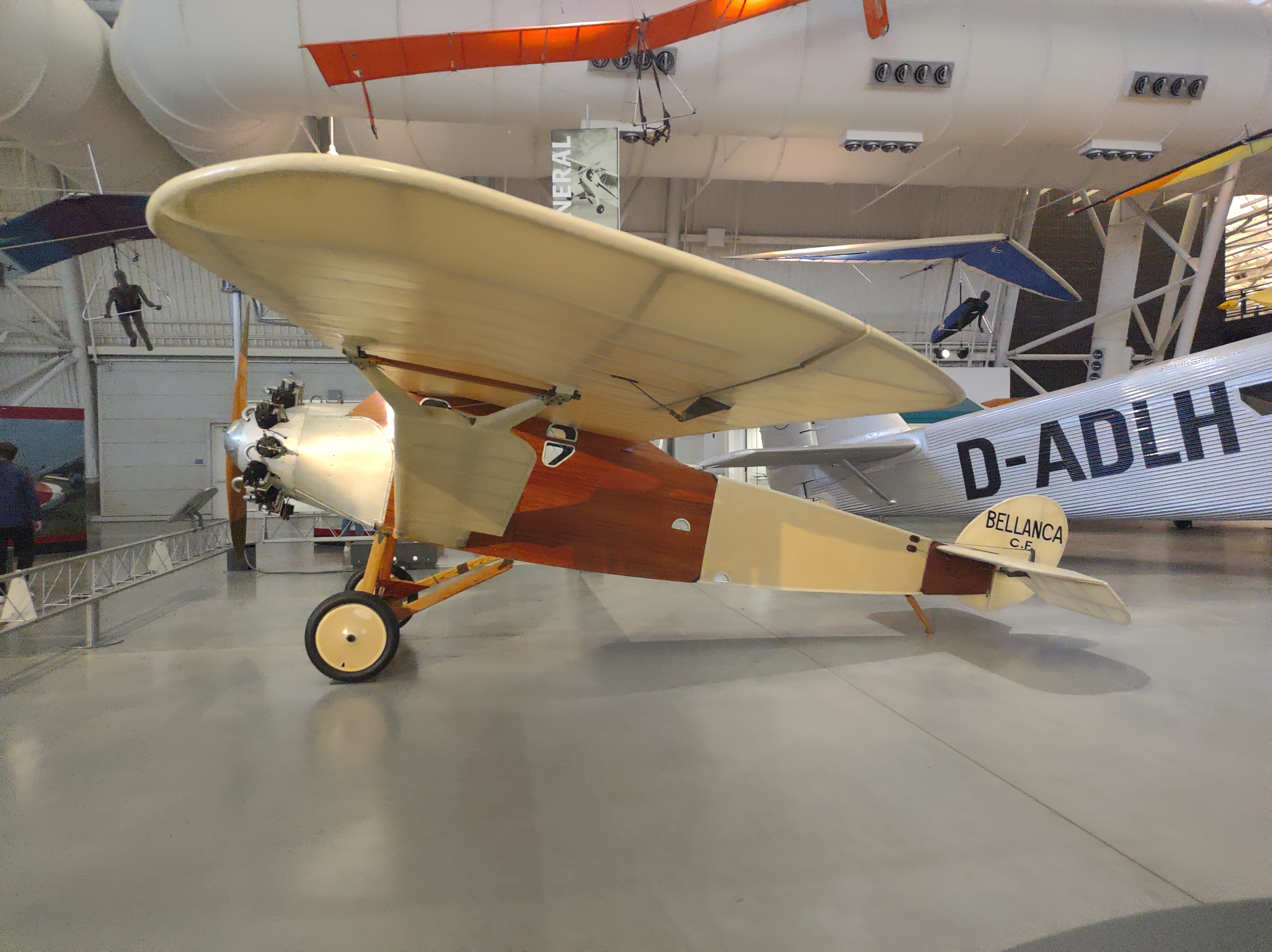
- The Bellanca CF at the Steven F. Udvar-Hazy Center

General information
- Type: Passenger Aircraft
- National origin: United States of America
- Manufacturer: Roos-Bellanca Aircraft Company
- Designer: Giuseppe Mario Bellanca
- Number built: 1

History
- First flight: June 8, 1922

The Bellanca CF is an early enclosed high-wing monoplane designed by Giuseppe Mario Bellanca that led to a successful series of Bellanca aircraft. Bellanca was nominated for the Collier Trophy in 1922 for the CF design.

== Development ==
Bellanca had previously designed his own parasol aircraft in Sicily, bringing the examples to New York to test fly. The Bellanca Aeroplane Company and Flying School was formed in 1911 at Mineola Long Island New York, where Bellanca taught the Mayor, Fiorello LaGuardia. Bellanca built a series of biplanes for the Maryland Pressed Steel Company, which folded shortly after World War I. Bellanca moved west to Omaha, Nebraska to found the Roos-Bellanca Aircraft Company with Victor H. Roos and A.H. Fetters. The short lived company produced only one Bellanca CF, but the enclosed cabin aircraft was ahead of its time before mail contracts made aircraft production profitable, and was an important step in a series of record setting aircraft developed by Bellanca afterward.

== Design ==
Bellanca started the CF design in 1921. The CF had a mahogany plywood wooden fuselage and fabric covered tail, wing and strut surfaces. The aircraft featured a fully enclosed cabin, with small windows. The fuselage was reinforced with steel wires. The landing gear was ash wood laminate with birch veneer. The wing struts, made of Port Orford cedar, had functional airfoil shapes to assist with lift.

The New York-based Yellow Air Cab Company purchased the CF in 1924 and modified it with an updated forward cockpit, more windows, and a 110 hp Anzani engine. In 1928 it was modified with a 55-gallon fuel tank and a modified vertical tail.

== Operational history ==
Bellanca met his landlord's daughter Dorothy Brown in Nebraska. She then helped in the building of the only CF. They married on November 18, 1922.

The Bellanca CF was test flown by airmail pilot Harry G. Smith June 8, 1922 at Fort Crook, Nebraska. The aircraft performed loops and rolls. The CF was flown around the country to garner publicity for sales. The CF was demonstrated at the Midwestern Flying Meet at Monmouth, Illinois, winning four performance awards. Airmail pilot Bill Hobson flew the CF at the Tarkio Aero Meet, the Interstate Aero Meet, and the 1923 National Air Races, winning the efficiency contest. Two marriage ceremonies were performed in the cabin as well. Bellanca left the short lived production company in 1924, joining Wright Aeronautical as a consultant.

The Yellow Air Cab Company and Continental Aircraft Corporation bought the aircraft for passenger use and fell into bankruptcy. The aircraft passed into private ownership, and was modified for more range. The famous pilot Bert Acosta took the plane up for its test flight before the intended test pilot, Paul Koltze did.

The sole CF was displayed at the Roosevelt Field Air Museum, then was owned by the Bellanca family before being donated to Smithsonian collection of the National Air and Space Museum in 1960.

== Variants ==
The Wright-Bellanca WB-1, was Bellanca's next advancement in wooden aircraft.

== Specifications (Bellanca CF) ==
Data from Air and Space Museum, except where noted

General characteristics

- Crew: One
- Capacity: four passengers4
- Length: 23 ft 10 in (7.26 m)
- Wingspan: 40 ft (12 m)
- Height: 7 ft 3 in (2.21 m)
- Wing area: 280.9 sq ft (26.10 m^{2})
- Airfoil: Bellanca M
- Empty weight: 950 lb (431 kg)
- Gross weight: 1,990 lb (903 kg)
- Fuel capacity: 50 US gal (42 imp gal; 190 L)
- Powerplant: 1 × Anzani 10-cylinder air-cooled radial piston engine, 95 hp (71 kW)
- Propellers: 2-bladed Bellanca, 8 ft (2.4 m) diameter

Performance

- Maximum speed: 96 kn (110 mph, 180 km/h)
- Stall speed: 35 kn (40 mph, 64 km/h)
- Rate of climb: 1,100 ft/min (5.6 m/s)
- Wing loading: 6.85 lb/sq ft (33.4 kg/m^{2})
