= Bellanca CE =

Aircraft

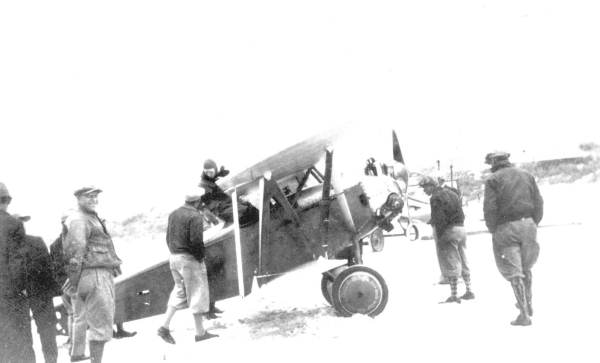
- Clarence Chamberlin at Cowan's Beach Airport. Daytona Beach, Floridam with his Bellanca CE

General information
- Type: Biplane trainer
- National origin: United States of America
- Manufacturer: Maryland Pressed Steel Company
- Designer: Giuseppe Mario Bellanca
- Number built: 1

History
- Introduction date: 1917
- First flight: September 1917

The Bellanca CE was the first aircraft designed for the Maryland Pressed Steel Company, by the aircraft designer Giuseppe Mario Bellanca. The aircraft was also called the Bellanca C.E. or the "CE Tractor Biplane".

== Development ==
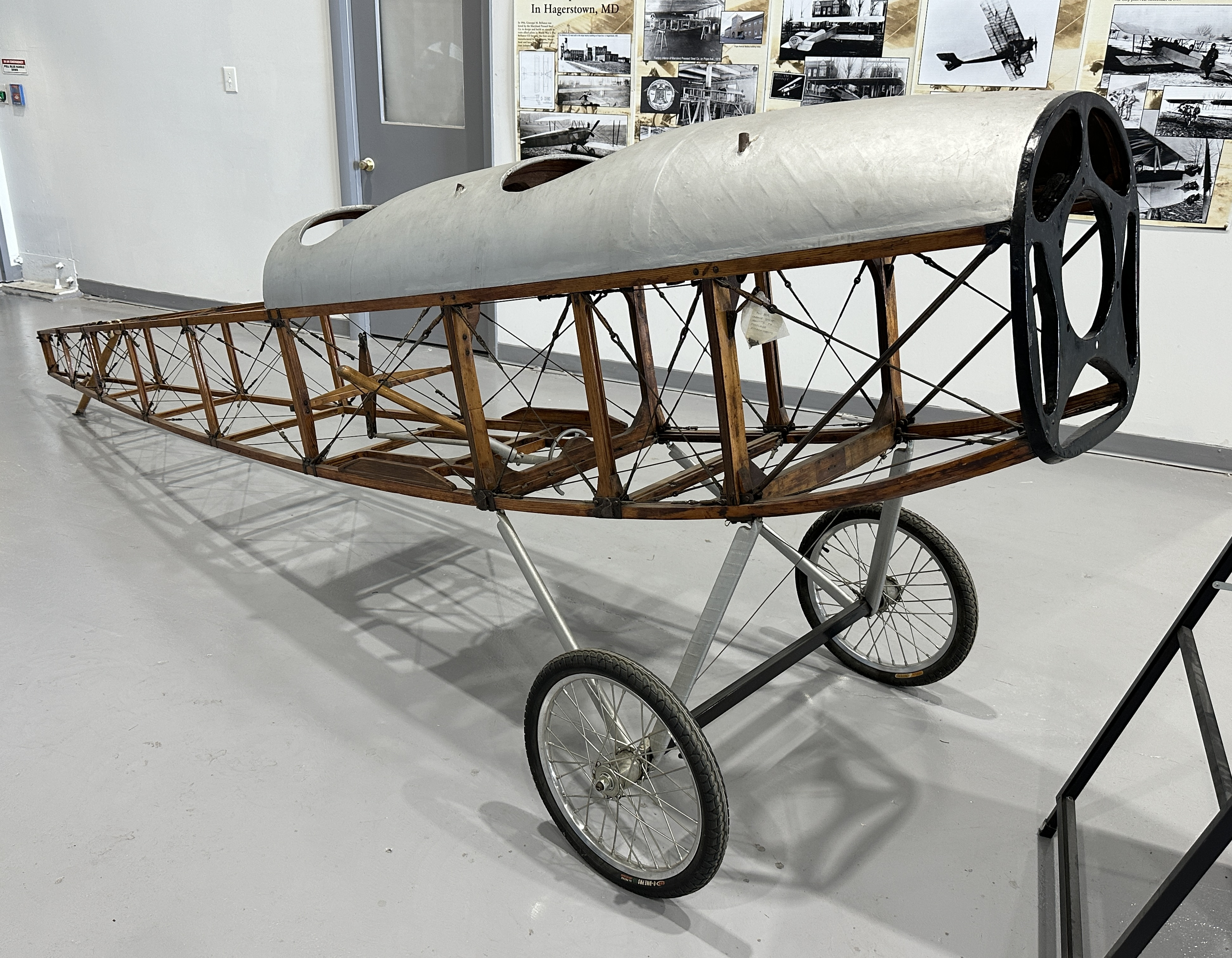
1919 Bellanca CE fuselage on display in the Hagerstown Aviation Museum

In 1916, the Maryland Pressed Steel Company hired Giuseppe Mario Bellanca to develop a two-seat biplane with intention to sell examples to the government during the war effort.

The two-seat plane was built at the Pope Avenue factory in Hagerstown, Maryland.

Bellanca had previously designed his own parasol aircraft in Sicily, bring the examples to New York to test fly. The Bellanca Aeroplane Company and Flying School was formed in 1911 at Mineola Long Island New York, where Bellanca taught the mayor, Fiorello LaGuardia.

== Design ==
The Bellanca CE was a two-seat biplane using ailerons for roll control rather than wing warping of its predecessor.

== Operational history ==
Although an example was built, the aircraft did not go into full production after the end of World War I brought a halt to new contracts. The aircraft was purchased in 1919 by a wartime flying instructor named Clarence Duncan Chamberlin. Chamberlin flew the C.E. to Glen Falls, New York commenting that Bellanca gave very conservative estimates of its performance and did not exaggerate its capabilities. Bellanca would remain friends with Chamberlin, hiring him later as his chief test pilot, and eventually setting a transcontinental air record in the Bellanca designed Wright-Bellanca WB-2 Columbia. One Maryland Pressed Steel employee, Lewis E. Reisner, went on to form Reisner Aero Service Company in Hagerstown, which eventually became the Kreider Reisner Aircraft Company.

== Variants ==
The prototype aircraft, was the Bellanca CD, was built with a 35 hp engine.

== Specifications Bellanca CE ==
Data from Air and Space Museum, Aerial Age April 1920

General characteristics

- Capacity: 2
- Length: 18 ft 6 in (5.64 m)
- Wingspan: 28 ft (8.5 m)
- Height: 7 ft 2 in (2.18 m)
- Empty weight: 500 lb (227 kg)
- Gross weight: 775 lb (352 kg)
- Powerplant: 1 × Anzani 3-cylinder radial, 55 hp (41 kW)

Performance

- Cruise speed: 87.3 kn (100.5 mph, 161.7 km/h)
- Range: 300–390 nmi (350–450 mi, 560–720 km)
- Service ceiling: 17,000 ft (5,200 m)
