= Hinchcliffe =

- Pronunciation: /ˈhɪntʃklɪf/
- Language: English

Origin
- Language: English
- Meaning: "henge" (steep) + "clif" (cliff/descent)
- Region of origin: England

Other names
- Variant forms: Hinchcliff, Hinchliffe, Henchcliff(e), Hinchsliff

Hinchcliffe is an English surname deriving from the place called Hinchcliff, near Holmfirth, in West Yorkshire. Notable people with the surname include:

- Andy Hinchcliffe (born 1969), British former footballer
- Celina Hinchcliffe (born 1976), British sports broadcaster
- James Hinchcliffe (born 1986), Canadian race car driver
- Philip Hinchcliffe (born 1944), British retired television producer, screenwriter and script editor, father of Celina Hinchcliffe
- Tony Hinchcliffe (born 1984), American comedian and writer
- W.G.R. Hinchcliffe (1894–1928), German Royal Naval Air Service and Royal Air Force flying ace

== Fictional people ==
- Charlotte Hinchcliffe, a character in British sitcom The Inbetweeners'

== See also ==
- Hinchliffe
