= Hinchliffe =

- Pronunciation: /ˈhɪntʃlɪf/
- Language: English

Origin
- Language: English
- Meaning: "henge" (steep) + "clif" (cliff/descent)
- Region of origin: England

Other names
- Variant forms: Hinchcliff(e), Hinchliffe, Henchcliff(e), Hinchsliff

Hinchliffe is an English surname deriving from the place called Hinchcliff, near Holmfirth, in West Yorkshire. Notable people with the surname include:

- John Hinchliffe (born 1972)

English businessman

- Ben Hinchliffe (born 1988), English footballer
- Brett Hinchliffe (born 1974), American baseball player
- Craig Hinchliffe (born 1972), Scottish footballer
- David Hinchliffe (born 1948), British politician
- Dickon Hinchliffe, British musician and composer
- Ian Hinchliffe (born 1952), British physicist
- Jackie Hinchliffe (born 1938), Scottish footballer
- John Hinchliffe (1731–1794), English churchman and college fellow
- Louie Hinchliffe (born 2002), British sprinter
- Sophie Hinchliffe (born 1990), British social media influencer better known as Mrs Hinch
- Stephen Hinchliffe (born 1950), English businessman
- Stirling Hinchliffe (born 1970), Australian politician
- Walter G. R. Hinchliffe (1894–1928), British aviator and World War I flying ace

== See also ==
- Hinchliffe Stadium, a sports venue in Paterson, New Jersey, United States
- Hinchliffe Brewing, a pre-Prohibition brewery in Paterson, New Jersey
- Hinchcliffe
- Hinchliff
