= Victor Roos =

Creator of the Cessna-Roos Aircraft Company (1888–1964)

Victor H. Roos
- Known for: Aviation Entrepreneurship

Victor H. Roos (April 26, 1888 – October 6, 1964) was an American entrepreneur and the founder or co-founder of several early aircraft companies.

== Biography ==
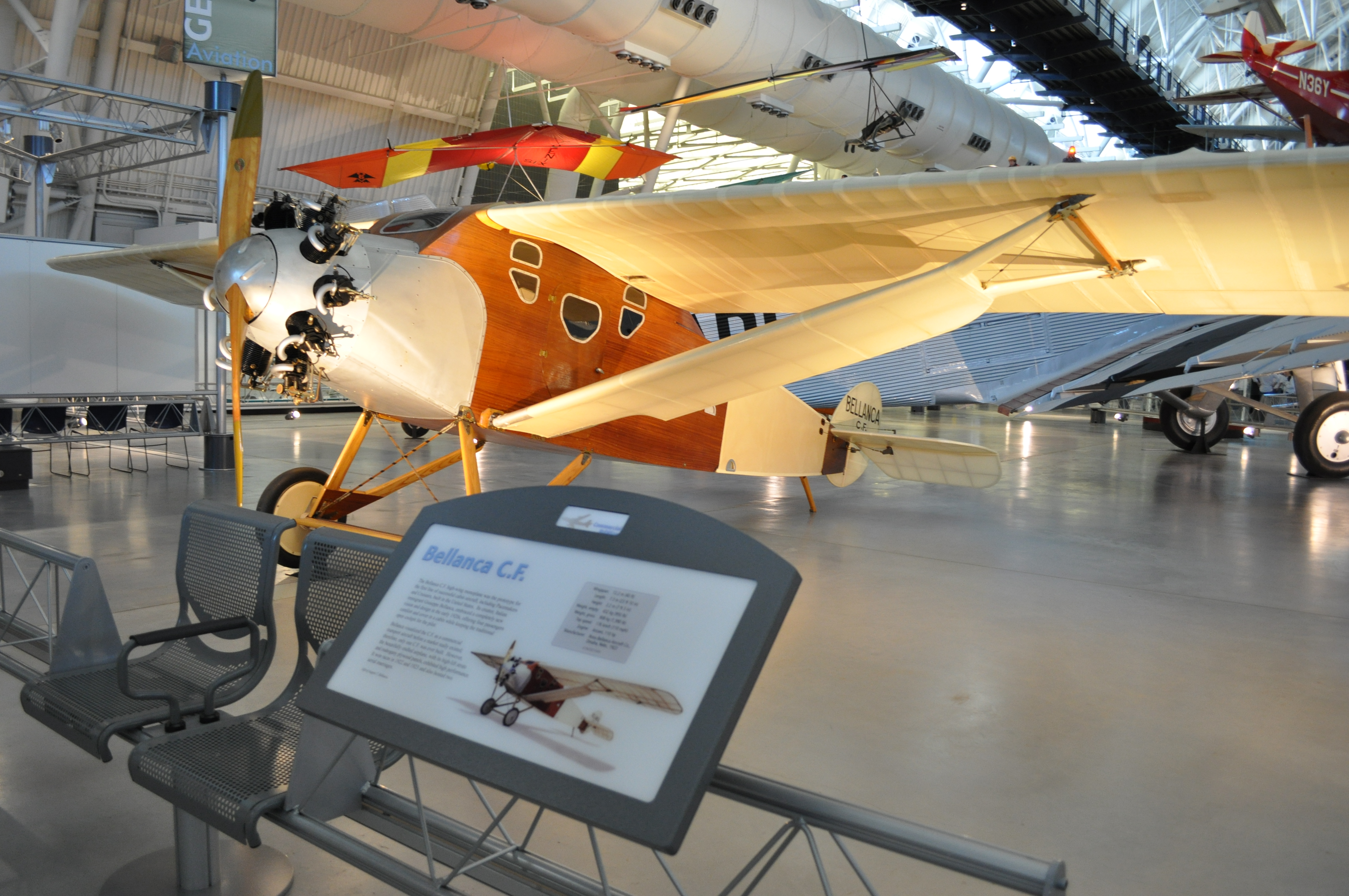
The only Bellanca CF built, at the National Air and Space Museum

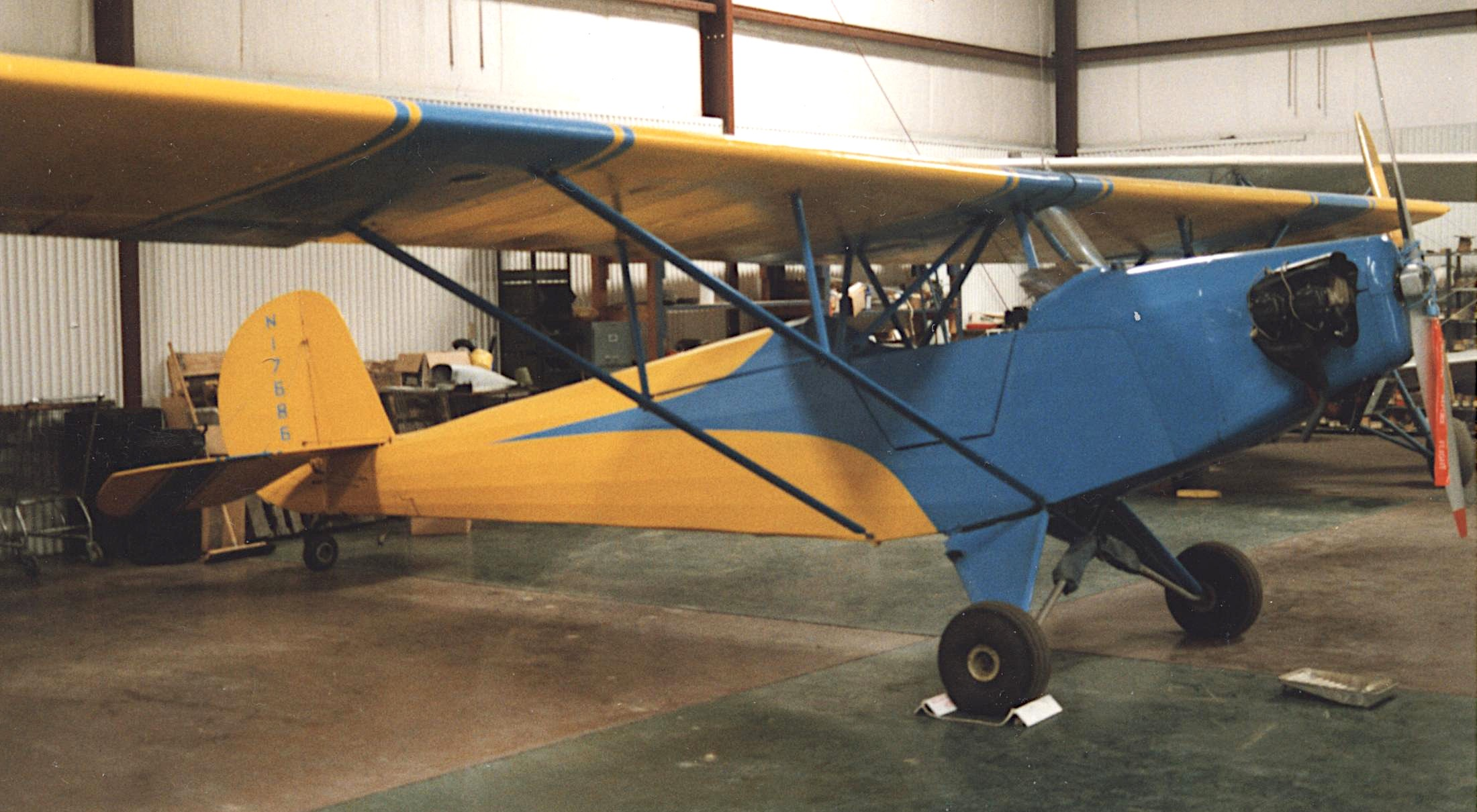
An American Eaglet B-31

In 1917 Roos was a distributor of Harley Davidson pedal cycles in Omaha, Nebraska, becoming one of the largest distributors in the Midwest.

In 1922, Roos and partner A.H. Fetters bought the aviation assets of the Maryland Pressed Steel Company and formed the Roos-Bellanca company (also known as the Omaha Aircraft Company) to build rising designer Giuseppe Bellanca's monoplane design, the CF. Only one example was built, but it became famous from its modern design, and publicity stunts such as holding in-flight weddings. The company dissolved in 1924.

In September 1927, Travel Air founder Clyde Cessna split from Walter Beech forming Cessna-Roos aircraft. Roos became the second largest shareholder in the start-up venture that went on to produce the most popular general aviation aircraft in the world. Roos resigned just one month into the partnership, selling back his interest to Cessna, and the company changed its name to Cessna Aircraft in December 1927.

In November 1927, the owner of the Swallow Airplane Company, Jacob Moellendick, became insolvent after sidelining Swallow production to make the Dallas Spirit on credit to enter the Dole Air Derby. Roos took control of the company, becoming the general manager, then left in 1928.

In 1928 Roos joined the American Eagle aircraft company, which produced more Bellanca designed aircraft. Roos and partners agreed to merge with Lincoln-Page Aircraft Company, becoming the American Eagle-Lincoln Aircraft based at Fairfax Airport in Kansas City, Missouri, where he became president. When the company dissolved during the depression, Roos founded the short lived Victor H. Roos Aircraft Company to continue to sell the American Eaglet design. With Roos's permission, Ben Howard built his famous air racer "Mr. Mulligan" at the factory site after production of the Eaglet had ceased.

After World War II Roos founded the Automatic Coin Machine Company in Kansas City to distribute jukebox machines.
