= Bellanca CD =

General information
- Type: Biplane trainer
- National origin: United States of America
- Manufacturer: Maryland Pressed Steel Company
- Designer: Giuseppe Mario Bellanca
- Number built: 6

History
- Introduction date: 1917
- First flight: September 1917

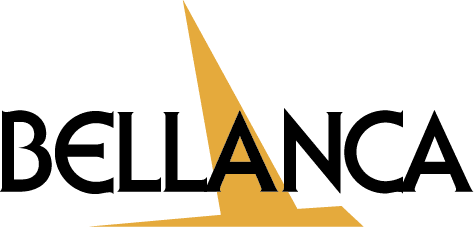
Logo of the Bellanca Aircraft, Inc.

The Bellanca CD was the first aircraft designed for the Maryland Pressed Steel Company, by the aircraft designer Giuseppe Mario Bellanca. The aircraft was also called the Bellanca C.D. or the "CD Tractor Biplane".

== Development ==
In 1916, the Maryland Pressed Steel Company hired Giuseppe Mario Bellanca to develop a two-seat biplane with intention to sell examples to the government during the war effort.

The two seat plane was built at the Pope Avenue factory in Hagerstown, Maryland, and test flown at Doub's Meadow field. On what is now South Hagerstown High School.

Bellanca had previously designed his own parasol aircraft in Sicily, bring the examples to New York to test fly. The Bellanca Aeroplane Company and Flying School was formed in 1911 at Mineola Long Island New York, where Bellanca taught the Mayor, Fiorello LaGuardia.

== Design ==
The Bellanca CD was a two-seat biplane using wing warping for roll control.

== Operational history ==
Although 6 examples were built, the aircraft did not go into full production after the end of World War I brought a halt to new contracts. One employee, Lewis E. Reisner, went on to form Reisner Aero Service Company in Hagerstown, which eventually became the Kreider Reisner Aircraft Company.

== Variants ==
The follow on aircraft, was the Bellanca CE, with a 55 hp engine.

== Specifications Bellanca CD ==
Data from Air and Space Museum

General characteristics

- Capacity: 2
- Length: 26 ft (7.9 m)
- Empty weight: 400 lb (181 kg)
- Gross weight: 775 lb (352 kg)
- Powerplant: 1 × Anzani 3-cylinder radial, 35 hp (26 kW)

Performance

- Cruise speed: 74 kn (85 mph, 137 km/h)
