= Hinchliff =

Hinchliff is a surname. Notable people with this surname include:

- Chris Hinchliff (born 1993 or 1994), British politician
- Peter Hinchliff (1929–1995), South African Anglican priest
- Thomas Woodbine Hinchliff (1825–1882), English mountaineer, traveller and author

== See also ==
- Hinchliffe
