= Clarence Chamberlin =

American aviation pioneer (1893–1976)

Clarence D. Chamberlin
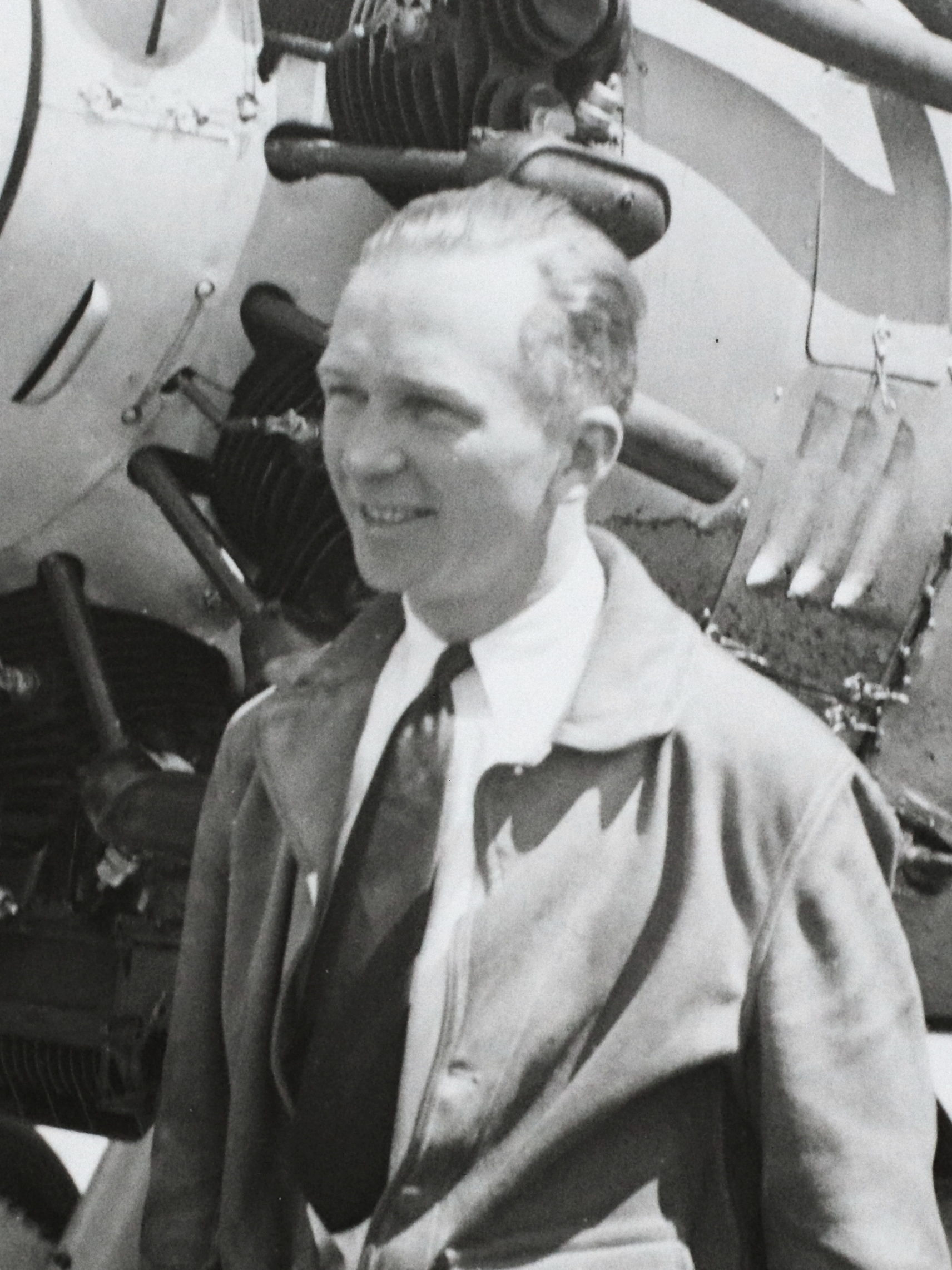
- Chamberlin in 1928
- Born: November 11, 1893; Denison, Iowa, U.S.
- Died: October 31, 1976 (aged 82); Derby, Connecticut, U.S.
- Resting place: Lawn Cemetery, Huntington, Connecticut
- Occupation: Aviator
- Known for: Piloted the first Transatlantic passenger flight
- Spouses: Wilda Bogert (m. 1919; div. 1936) Louise Ashby (m. 1936–1976)
- Children: Philip (1925-2011); Clarisse (b. 1940); Cathy (1942-2024)
- Parent(s): E.C. Chamberlin (1870–1938) and Jesse Duncan

Clarence Duncan Chamberlin (November 11, 1893 – October 31, 1976) was an American aviation pioneer. He was the second man to pilot a fixed-wing aircraft across the Atlantic Ocean, from New York to the European mainland, while carrying the first transatlantic passenger.

== Early life and education ==
Clarence Duncan Chamberlin was born in the small town of Denison, Iowa, to Elzie "EC" Clarence and Jessie Duncan Chamberlin. "EC" was the local jeweler and the owner of the first automobile in Denison, which was notorious throughout Crawford County for the clattering sounds it emitted while in operation. Maintaining the vehicle was a near constant endeavor, and in this way Chamberlin first developed an interest in all things mechanical. Additionally, he found great delight in using his mechanical skills to repair the clocks and watches that would be brought into his father's jewelry shop on an almost daily basis. It was also in Denison that Chamberlin would see his first airplane, an early pusher type plane, which had put on a show for a Firemen's Convention that had been held in Denison. From that moment on, a desire grew within Chamberlin to one day take to the skies himself.

After completing his education in the Denison Public Schools system in 1912, Chamberlin enrolled at the Denison Normal and Business College. While at the school, Chamberlin took college prep courses to help him in his pursuit of a degree in electrical engineering at Iowa State College in Ames, Iowa. In order to pay for those classes, Chamberlin simultaneously worked nights as a tender for the Ft. Dodge, Des Moines, and Southern Railroad Company in the railroad's electrical power sub-station in Ankeny, Iowa. This arrangement forced Chamberlin to live on trains, where he would study, eat, and sleep during travel between work and classes. In 1914, Chamberlin left Denison Normal and Business College as a sophomore in order to run a local Harley-Davidson dealership.

== World War I years ==
Under Chamberlin's stewardship, the Harley-Davidson dealership thrived. As the owner of the dealership, he had the opportunity to utilize his mechanical knowledge to both repair and sell the motorcycles. In 1915, he was offered a job by Charles W. Tabor—one of Denison's more prominent citizens—to serve as a chauffeur on a six-month trip throughout the Southwest and into San Francisco for the World's Fair. It was in San Francisco that Chamberlin rediscovered his passion for flying, when he saw an airplane there for the second time—an early-style flying boat that was carrying passengers at $25.00 per head. When he told Tabor of his intention to take a ride on the plane, the latter replied "You can risk your fool neck in one of those some other time, but right now I've got a lot more places on the coast that I want to visit; what's more, I don't intend looking around for another driver to get me back home". While Chamberlin lost this opportunity, his passion for flying was not quieted.

Returning to Denison in 1916, Chamberlin expanded the motorcycle business by adding a line of REO automobiles and Diamond tires to his dealership. In addition to hiring two more staff members, Chamberlin added a service station for cars, motorcycles, and tire repair, with the latter being the most profitable aspect of the business.

In 1917, Chamberlin decided to finally pursue his dream of flying. On Thanksgiving Day, he traveled to Omaha, Nebraska, where he enlisted in the Aviation Section of the United States Army Signal Corps as an aviator. However, he was told that the field of aviation was too crowded at that time, and that he should pursue a career as a military balloonist instead. As Chamberlin wanted to fly airplanes, he declined the offer and returned to Denison, where he waited for a position to open up at the military's flying school. Chamberlin's dream of becoming an aviator would finally materialize on March 16, 1918, when he received orders to report to the School of Military Aeronautics at Champaign, Illinois, where the Aviation Ground School had been established at the University of Illinois. Following his time at the Ground School, Chamberlin reported to Chanute Field, where he continued his aviation education. His flying ability progressed rapidly under the tutelage of his military instructors. On July 15, 1918, Chamberlin received a commission as a second lieutenant in the Army Signal Corps. Soon after his promotion, he became an instructor himself until November 1, 1918, when he received orders to proceed to Hoboken, New Jersey, where he would await his deployment overseas. However, when he arrived at Hoboken on November 11, Chamberlin was notified that the World War I had ended that day.

On January 2, 1919, Chamberlin married his sweetheart, Wilda Bogert of Independence, Iowa, whom he met while traveling with Tabor. On July 2, Chamberlin was honorably discharged from military service. By the time of his discharge, he had come to the realization that aviation was something he wanted to do for the rest of his life. To that effect, he ordered a newly-designed airplane by famed aviator Giuseppe Mario Bellanca for $4,000. However, this plane would not be completely constructed or delivered for another 14 months. Therefore, upon the urging of his father, Chamberlin returned to Denison to help run the family jewelry store. Chamberlin soon grew tired of the jewelry business, and so he expanded the store's inventory to include talking machines, which he eventually found himself traveling around the county selling. For all intents and purposes, Chamberlin was content with his life—until one day he heard an airplane flying overhead. Upon running outside to catch a glimpse of the plane, Chamberlin decided that he was not destined to be running a jewelry store or selling talking machines, but that only flying was in his blood. That next spring, Chamberlin closed his bank account and, along with his wife, moved to the Eastern United States to await the delivery of his long-awaited plane.

== Aviation career ==
=== Barnstorming ===
When the Bellanca Model CE airplane finally arrived, Chamberlin discovered that while it had a smaller engine than he had expected, it could still fly faster, land slower, and even carry a passenger along with the pilot. With this plane, he hoped to make a living by barnstorming his way across the country—flying over towns at low altitudes to catch the attention of the citizenry. After landing in an open field near a town after passing overhead multiple times, the townsfolk would oftentimes come out to see the barnstorming pilot, who would then offer them the opportunity to go up in his plane—for a price. He charged $15 per ride for straight and easy flying, but for the more daring who wanted "the works", his price was $25. The Bellanca was ultimately totaled by catching on fire, but since the plane was insured, the company gave him a standard biplane as a replacement. To supplement his income from barnstorming and to help cover his many expenses, Chamberlin worked as a flight instructor, an air-mail pilot, and an aerial photographer. Additionally, he and a partner would buy surplus Army planes, restore them, and then sell them and split the profits. However, all of these sources of income proved barely enough to keep up with his and his wife's expenses.

=== Endurance record and Orteig Prize ===
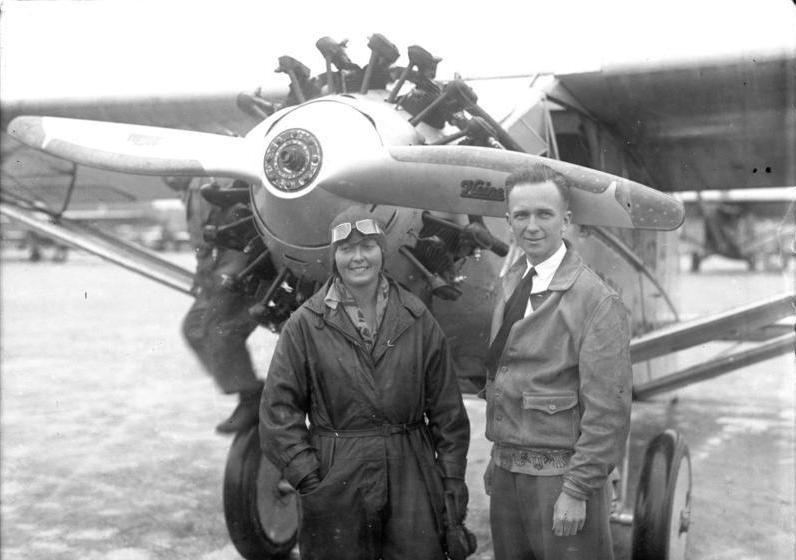
Chamberlin with Thea Rasche in May 1928

During his years as a barnstormer, Chamberlin had earned a reputation across the country as a hotshot pilot due to his superb performances in several air races around the country. Even a rather spectacular incident in the 1925 New York International Air Races, where he had crashed his plane after striking some telephone wires, served only to enhance his credibility with the American public. Yet Chamberlin aspired to even greater heights of public fame; he wanted to win the Orteig Prize, a $25,000 reward offered by New York hotel owner Raymond Orteig to the first aviator(s) to fly non-stop from New York City to Paris. However, before he could attempt such a flight, Chamberlin needed to show that he could stay up in the air long enough to cover the 3,530 miles (3,070 nmi; 5,680 km) from New York to Paris. Chamberlin would do this by breaking the endurance record for flight, which at that time was held by Drouhin and Landry of France, who in August 1925 had stayed in the air for 45 hours, 11 minutes, and 59 seconds of continual flight.

On Tuesday, April 12, 1927, Chamberlin, along with friend and fellow aviator Bert Acosta, took off from Roosevelt Field in New York at 9:30 a.m. Loaded with 375 US gallons (312 imp gal; 1,420 L) of fuel and other necessities, they flew the Wright-Bellanca WB-2 monoplane (which would later be named Miss Columbia) back and forth over Long Island. While the flight was marred with difficulties, including accidentally-triggered gasoline cut-off valves and a lack of water for the pilots, it ultimately proved successful. On April 14—51 hours, 11 minutes, and 25 seconds after takeoff—Chamberlin and Acosta finally landed, having exceeded the Frenchmen's record by nearly six hours. "The craft had flown approximately 4,100 miles [3,600 nmi; 6,600 km], about 500 miles [430 nmi; 800 km] further than that needed for a New York to Paris flight and the $25,000 Raymond Orteig Prize." However, as Chamberlin so bluntly stated, "Bert and I had won a record, but had not won the right to fly the Bellanca to Paris".

=== Miss Columbia ===
The Wright-Bellanca WB-2 monoplane—now called Miss Columbia—was designed by Giuseppe Bellanca. He had been commissioned by the Wright Aeronautical Corporation to produce a plane for their new J-5 Whirlwind engine. After breaking the endurance record for flight in 1927, Chamberlin would go on to use the plane later that same year to make his famous trans-Atlantic flight. While the WB-2 appeared to be "just another straightforward high-wing monoplane with clean if rather angular lines", it was, unlike others of its class, able to lift a huge payload. This was due mainly to two features: "a profiled fuselage and wide aerofoil-section wing struts, both [of which] contribut[ed] considerably to [the plane's] total lift.

Prior to Chamberlin's successful endurance flight, the WB-2 was purchased by Charles A. Levine, the wealthy, millionaire salvage dealer and the president of the Columbia Aircraft Corporation. Charles Lindbergh himself had tried to buy the plane before Chamberlin's endurance flight, but Levine refused Lindbergh's offer. Soon after its purchase, the "aeroplane was christened Miss Columbia by two little girls who performed the ceremony with ginger ale. Afterwards they were treated to a joy-ride by Clarence Chamberlin". However, the joy ride almost ended in tragedy when part of the undercarriage tore loose on take-off, but Chamberlin was able to safely and skillfully land the plane.

Miss Columbia holds the distinction of not only being the first plane to carry a trans-Atlantic passenger, but also of being the first plane to make the trans-Atlantic crossing twice. Three years after its record-breaking flight with Chamberlin, the now newly-renamed Maple Leaf—flown by Canadian Captain J. Erroll Boyd and U.S. Naval Air Service Lieutenant Harry P. Connor—flew the plane from Harbour Grace, Newfoundland, to Pentle Bay, Tresco, in the Isles of Scilly.

After many years of superior service, Miss Columbia was retired in 1934 to Bellanca Field in New Castle, Delaware. That same year, it was scheduled for a well-deserved place in the Smithsonian, being one of the most significant aircraft in aviation history. However, on January 25, 1934—the day before the transfer was to take place—a fire leveled the storage barn where Miss Columbia, along with six other aircraft, was being stored, leading to the loss of the WB-2.

=== Transatlantic flight ===
Clarence Chamberlain and Ruth Rowland Nichols presenting an aircraft to a US naval air station commander in 1930

Chamberlin and Acosta's successful endurance flight convinced Levine that an attempt at a crossing of the Atlantic was feasible and that the Orteig Prize was within reach. In Chamberlin and Acosta, Levine had a superb flying team; however, in a move that surprised many, Levine replaced Acosta with Lloyd W. Bertaud, an acclaimed pilot of the east, as the navigator. However, near constant arguments over the choice of crew, the route to be followed, and whether wireless equipment should be installed plagued preparations for the Trans-Atlantic flight. Yet, it still appeared that Chamberlin and Bertaud would beat Charles Lindbergh as the first people to successfully cross the Atlantic.

However, the Orteig Prize was not to be theirs. "In a move never explained, Levine dumped Bertaud, giving up his chance for history as a result. Bertaud was so upset he obtained a temporary restraining order preventing the Columbia from lifting off without him." Indeed, the court injunction against Levine and Miss Columbia allowed Lindbergh and his Spirit of St. Louis to take off for his Trans-Atlantic flight before Chamberlin. On May 19, Lindbergh even met with Chamberlin, who gave him his weather charts for the Atlantic Ocean. On May 20, Lindbergh took off for Paris and his date with destiny. Chamberlin, on the other hand, was still grounded by the court injunction and bad weather.

When the court injunction was finally dropped—thanks to personal appeals from the plane's creator Giuseppe Bellanca—it was too late for Miss Columbia and Chamberlin to be the first to make the historic Trans-Atlantic flight. Soon after this, Bellanca severed ties with Levine and announced that his "sole concern [had been] to prove that [his] plane, built in America and manned by Americans, could successfully make the New York-to-Paris flight ... adding another stage to the experimental development of aviation in this country". However, while the injunction had been dropped, two questions remained to be answered: who would fly with Chamberlin? And what was the purpose of their flight going to be now that Lindbergh had beaten them for the Orteig Prize? Even Chamberlin's participation in the flight seemed uncertain. Levine had started to entertain doubts about Chamberlin, not because of his flying ability, but about his homely appearance, fearing he might not be photogenic enough to get much publicity. But in the end, Levine decided to keep Chamberlin. It was soon decided by the two men that since they could not achieve the distinction of being the first to cross the Atlantic via airplane, they would instead work to achieve the distance record, and outshine Lindbergh in that way. Exactly two weeks after Lindbergh's historic flight, Miss Columbia was ready to take off. The plane was grossly overloaded with 455 gallons of gasoline, food, water, and instrumentation, but in order for Chamberlin to beat the distance record, the overloading was a necessary evil. On June 4, 1927, Chamberlin was ready to begin his historic flight from Roosevelt Field; however, the plane still lacked a navigator. As the engine started ticking over and the plane was only minutes away from taking off, Levine—who had been at the airfield with his wife to send off Chamberlin—acted "as if to close the cabin door [but instead] suddenly climbed in to occupy the second seat ... and without a single word of explanation either to his wife or to officials on the airfield, Levine gave the order for departure". In this way, Chamberlin and the first Trans-Atlantic passenger took off together and made history.

From the beginning of the flight, there were difficulties. Fog and strong winds soon caused Miss Columbia to fly southward off course, even though they were able to roughly maintain a flight plan similar to that of Lindbergh's. However, as they were approaching the European continent they had a stroke of good luck in that they spotted the famous Cunard liner Mauretania. The ship had been on its way from Southampton to New York, and—utilizing a copy of The New York Times they had with them on the plane—they were able to ascertain the Mauretania's sailing date and thus calculate their position and realign themselves on a trajectory towards England. Within hours, they had land in sight.

However, as soon as they reached Germany, they became lost once again. Urged on by Levine to reach Berlin, Chamberlin pushed the plane to the extreme. When the fuel finally ran out, they were forced to put down at Helfta near Eisleben at 5:35 A.M. (local time) after a non-stop flight of 3,911 miles in 42 hours 45 minutes, having beaten Lindbergh's record by just over 300 miles. Upon landing, the locals gave the aviators some fuel but also bad directions, which forced them to take yet another emergency landing, which shattered their wooden propeller. "One day and one new airscrew later, the Miss Columbia landed in Berlin to the cheers of 150,000 people." After the ceremony

Chamberlin was informed that his mother was calling him from Omaha, Nebraska. It had been arranged by the American Telegraph Company and the Chicago Daily News ... [and while] it was not a direct connection, Chamberlin would talk to the operator in London [who would] relay the message to Mrs. E. C. Chamberlin [and vice versa]. It was believed, at that time, that the call was the longest distance phone call ever completed.

Following their successful landing and reception in Berlin

they set off on a short tour of European capitals visiting Munich, Vienna, Budapest, Prague, Warsaw, and Zurich. Then they finally left for Paris, reaching the French capital on the last day of June. During the month since leaving New York on the 4th they had covered a grand total of 6,320 miles.

In Paris, Levine disclosed his plans to Chamberlin to return by air to New York. "Well aware of the foolhardiness of such a scheme, Clarence Chamberlin wisely elected to return by sea and Levine began to look for another pilot." Levine had no luck in finding anyone foolhardy enough to take up the task, so he decided to do it himself. Levine, who had absolutely no flight experience, went rogue and took his plane into the sky heading for London. His scheme had aerodrome officials on both sides of the English Channel frantic. After several failed attempts and near-misses, Levine was able to put down at the Croydon airfield. He then prudently made the decision to return with the plane to New York via ship.

=== Flying off the Leviathan ===
Returning to America on the SS Leviathan of the U.S. Lines, Chamberlin again made history. While on board, U.S. Line officials questioned him

about the feasibility of using airplanes in conjunction [with] ships like the Leviathan, to hop off from the deck with an airplane as the ocean liner neared port, thus speeding up the delivery of mail and possibly passengers who were in a hurry and willing to pay for being ashore even as much as a day before the vessel docked.

Chamberlin responded in the affirmative, and construction began on a runway for the Leviathan's deck under his supervision upon docking in Boston:

On July 31, 1927, a Wright Aeronautical Service airplane with a Wright Whirlwind Engine was loaded aboard the Leviathan. On August 1, the ship headed out to sea accompanied by three Coast Guard destroyers, to be situated in various positions from the ocean liner in case they were needed for rescue.

After the rains slackened, the seas calmed down, and all of the reporters were seasick, Chamberlin attempted takeoff:

The Leviathan's 19 knot speed and the wind blowing gave a component air flow straight up the runway, down which the takeoff would be attempted. Chamberlin had expected to use the entire runway, but at about three-fourths of the way the plane was flung into the air by up-thrusting winds turned skyward by the sides of the big ocean liner.

Chamberlin's original destination was Teterboro Airport in Teterboro, New Jersey. Unfortunately, thick fog forced him to take a detour to Curtiss Field where he waited an hour for the fog to lift. He then took off for Teterboro Airport to deliver the "first ship-to-shore mail". He was greeted at the airfield by all 17 inhabitants of Teterboro and 15,000 others.

=== Later activities ===
Following his numerous aviation exploits in 1927, Chamberlin was considered one of the seven greatest flyers in the world. With his days of breaking records coming to an end, Chamberlin switched his focus to designing, manufacturing and selling planes out of his factory in New Jersey. "Clarence Chamberlin's Aircraft Plant produced a line of aircraft that he'd intended airlines to use to transport passengers to all parts of the United States." The Chamberlin Eight-Seater—or Crescent Aircraft as it was more commonly known—"was an improved airplane incorporating designs that his ample flying experience had shown him were needed for a better aircraft". The plane could carry eight passengers in addition to the pilot, and featured "rest room facilities for the comfort of the passengers". During the 1930s, he traveled around the United States in his 26-passenger Curtiss Model 53 Condor plane giving rides to people, not so much as a "barnstormer" but as more of a hobbyist. His Curtiss Condor at the time was the largest passenger-carrying airship in the United States which landed on solid ground. Only the China Clipper, which could only land on water, and the Army bomber, which could not carry passengers, exceeded the Curtiss Condor in size. "His purpose for [traveling around the United States was] to take passengers for short flights at a nominal fee as a means of popularizing travel in passenger ships."

Chamberlin received recognition in his hometown when "On August 24, 1930, a Chamberlin Day took place at the Weberg brothers' airport [in Denison], which at that time was known as 'Weberg Airways Inc.'" Around 18,000 people came out to airfield to wish Chamberlin well and to celebrate the airfield's renaming as Chamberlin Field. Entertainment consisted of around 46 planes taking part in aerial maneuvers and races accompanied by several town bands, bugle corps, and drum lines providing musical accompaniment.

During the period of renewed hostilities in Europe, Chamberlin "trained workers in his aircraft factory to work in defense plants during World War II, giving the plants skilled workers. He trained several thousand such workers, [which greatly] assist[ed] the war effort". He continued to fly, sell, and tinker with airplanes after the war, and up until his retirement.

== Personal life ==
Chamberlin married Wilda Bogert of Independence, Iowa on January 3, 1919; they divorced in 1936. During a barnstorming trip that year, Chamberlin "brought [one of his Curtiss Condors] to Maine to display it at an air show where he held a contest to find a young lady to use for promotional purposes and to be a stewardess". Louise Ashby (1907–2000)—a teacher and daughter of the Maine Governor at the time—entered the contest, and Chamberlin asked her to marry him the very next day. He went on to adopt her son, Philip (1925–2011), and the family added two more children with the births of Clarisse (b. 1940) and Cathy (1942-2024).

== Final years and death ==
In 1970, the city of Denison hosted a Flight Fair at the new Denison Municipal Airport to honor native aviators Clarence Chamberlin and Charles Fink, (Note: Charles Fink was a resident of the Denison-Deloit area who served as an airplane commander on one of the three B-52s to make the first jet-powered non-stop round-the-globe flight in 1957.) and to celebrate the airfield's new designation as Chamberlin-Fink Field. Chamberlin was unable to attend. In the years prior to 1977, Denison had planned to invite Chamberlin to return to the city for the celebration of the 50th anniversary of his Trans-Atlantic flight, but the aviator died on October 31, 1976 due to complications from a routine flu shot. He was buried at Lawn Cemetery in Huntington, Connecticut.

== Works ==
Chamberlin authored his semi-autobiographical book Record Flights shortly after completing his Trans-Atlantic flight. The book, which was published in 1928, was generally well-received by critics. In addition to the Trans-Atlantic flight, the book covered a variety of other topics including the author's hopes, accomplishments, failures, and also speculation as to what had happened to pilots who had disappeared over the ocean. In the 1940s, he published a revised version of the book that included information about his adventures after the trans-Atlantic flight, and his efforts during World War II. On the cover, the newly revised book read Record Flights Book One, and below it, a second title was Give 'em Hell Book Two.

== Legacy ==
Chamberlin was honored in the National Aviation Hall of Fame at Dayton, Ohio, and the Iowa Aviation Hall of Fame. The Clarence D. Chamberlin House is on the National Register of Historic Places.

=== Selected aviation records ===
- April 14, 1927 – Endurance Flight: 51 hours, 11 minutes, and 25 seconds
- June 4–6, 1927 – First Transatlantic Passenger Flight (Charles A. Levine, passenger)
- June 4–6, 1927 – Distance Flight: 3,905 miles
- Summer 1927 – First ship-to-shore flight off of the SS Leviathan

== In popular culture ==
- Clarence Chamberlin: Fly First & Fight Afterward, a documentary by independent filmmaker Billy Tooma, covers Chamberlin's life and historic transatlantic flight in great depth. The film saw its world première on April 21, 2011, at the Myrtle Beach International Film Festival and was nominated for the National Aviation Hall of Fame's 2011 Combs-Gates Award. The documentary was recut in 2017, in honor of the 90th anniversary of Chamberlin's flight, and re-released under its new title.

== Notes ==
Preceded by Charles Lindbergh	Transatlantic flight 1927	Succeeded by Richard E. Byrd
