= Wilmer Stultz =

20th-century American aviator

Wilmer Lower Stultz
- Stultz in 1928
- Born: 11 April 1900
- Died: July 1, 1929 (aged 29); Roosevelt Field; New York
- Cause of death: Air crash
- Resting place: Presbyterian Cemetery; Williamsburg, Pennsylvania
- Occupation: Pilot
- Spouse: Mildred Potts (m. 1919–1929)

Wilmer Lower Stultz (April 11, 1900 – July 1, 1929) was an aviator who made the first non-stop flight between New York City and Havana, Cuba. He flew Amelia Earhart when she became the first woman to make a trans-Atlantic flight. He died in a crash in 1929.

== Biography ==
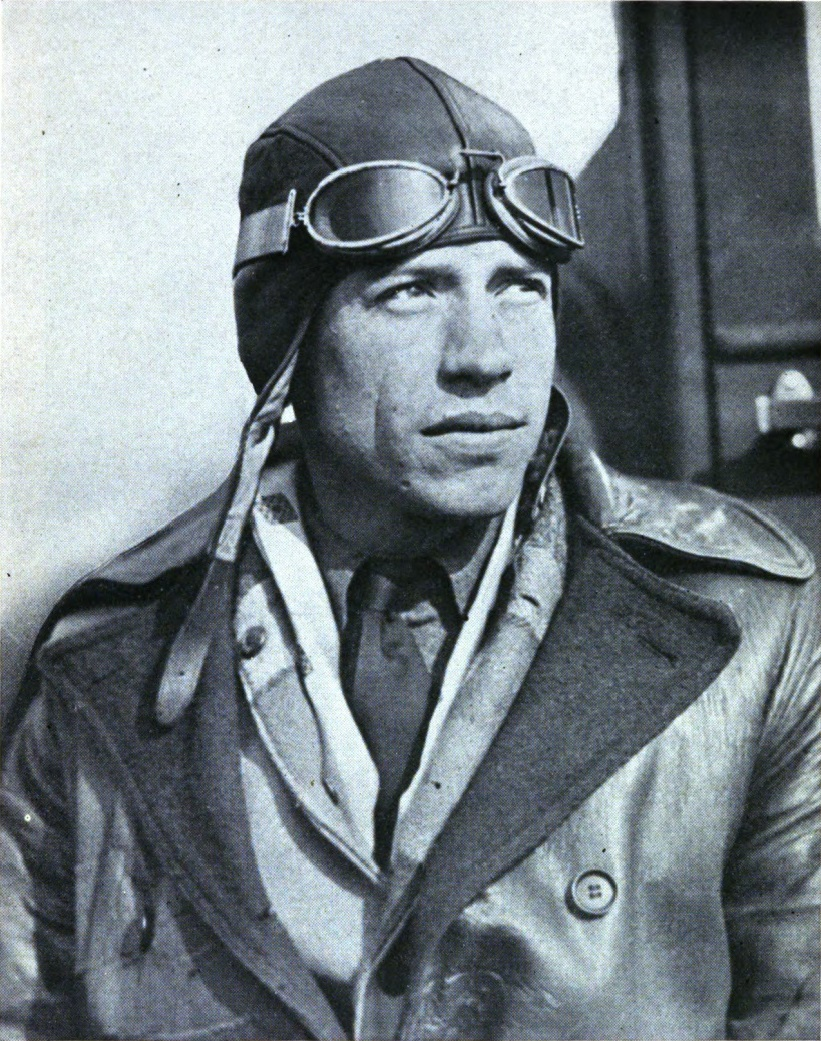
Wilmer Stultz wearing aviation gear

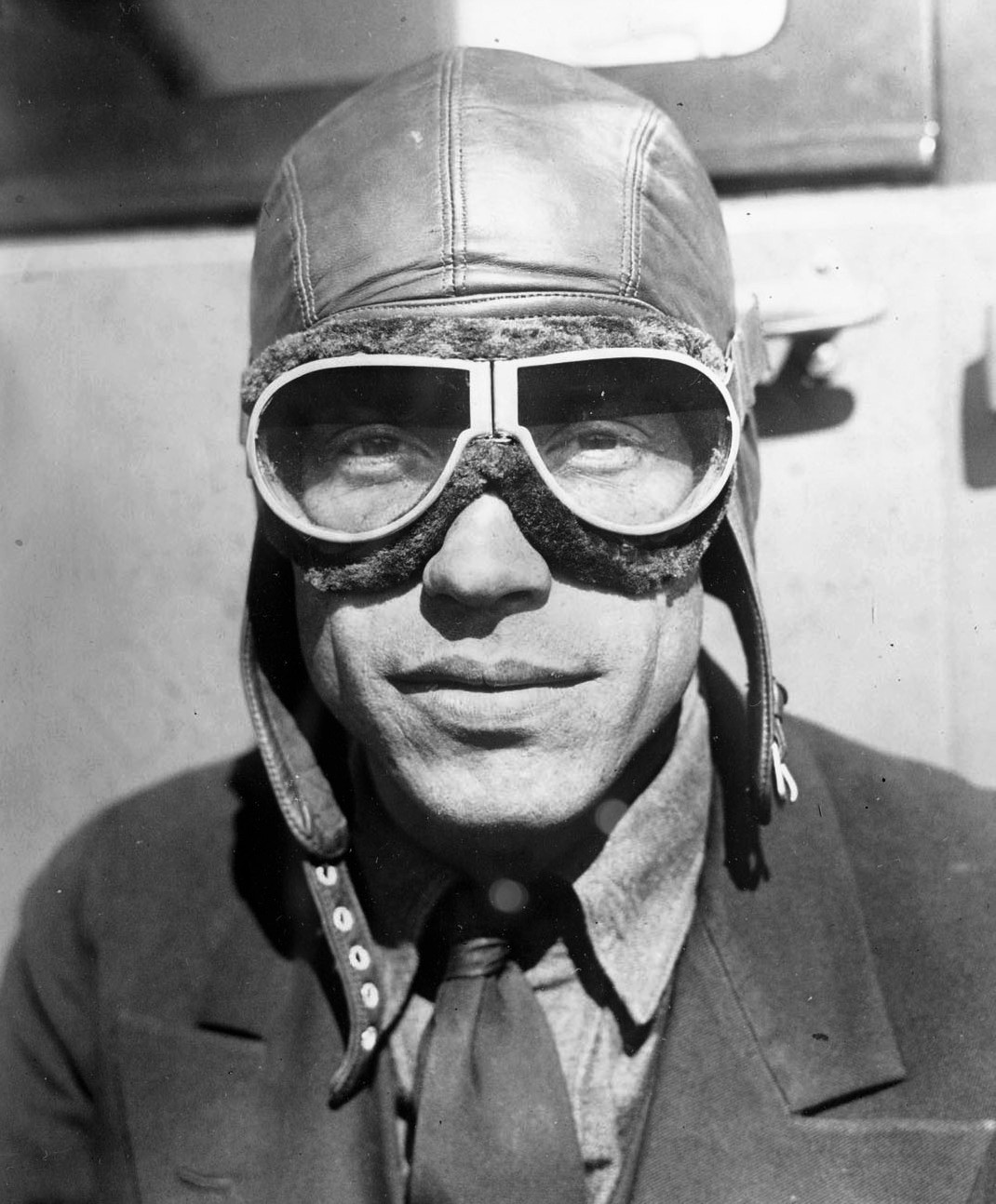
Aviator Wilmer Stultz in 1928

He was born in Williamsburg, Pennsylvania, on April 11, 1900.

Stultz joined the United States Army Air Force on 22 August 1917 and was assigned to the 634th Aero Supply Squadron, reaching the rank of Sergeant. He was discharged on 31 March 1919. Stultz then joined the United States Naval Air Service in December that year, training at Pensacola, Florida. He served at Hampton Roads, Virginia, testing the F5L flying boat.

He married Mildred Potts of Middletown, Pennsylvania, on August 4, 1919.

On March 5, 1928, Stultz, Oliver Colin LeBoutillier, and Mabel Boll on an improvised seat, made the first non-stop flight in the Columbia between New York City and Havana, Cuba (c. 1300 mi.).

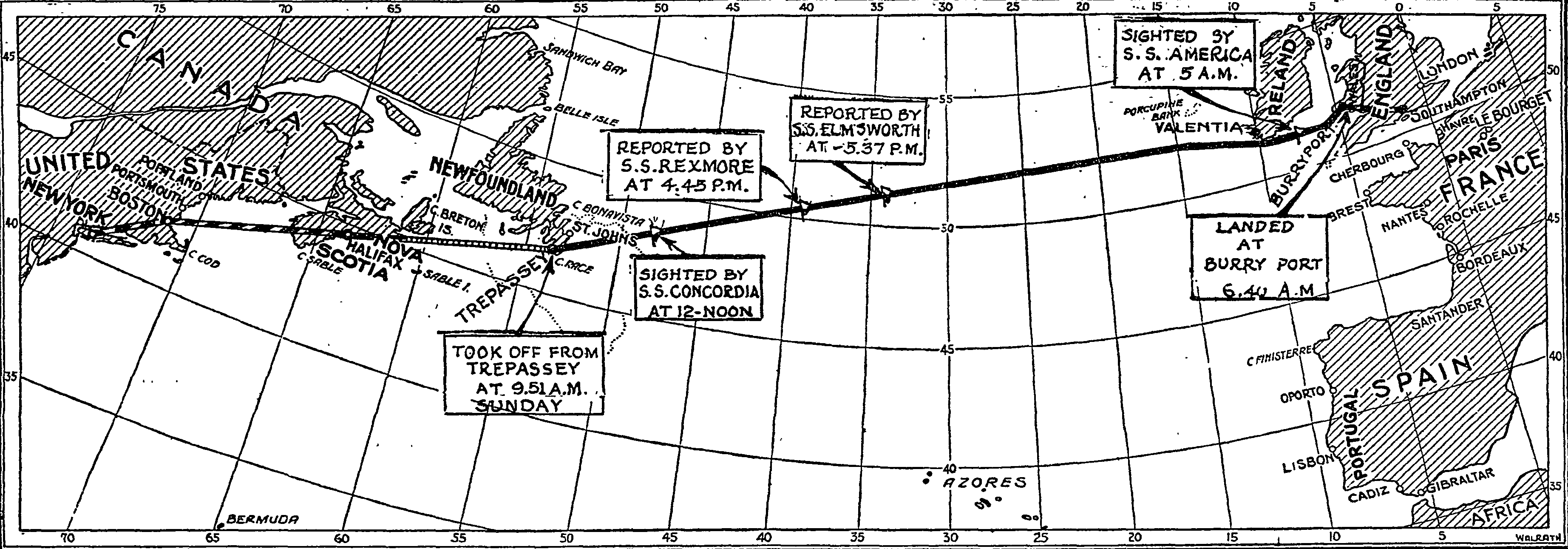
map of the flight taken by Friendship

Stultz was the pilot of the Fokker Trimotor "Friendship" on June 18, 1928, when Amelia Earhart became the first woman passenger to cross the Atlantic Ocean by airplane.

Stultz was killed in a crash at Roosevelt Field in Mineola, New York on July 1, 1929. Two passengers were also killed. It was firstly reported that he had been intoxicated on the flight, but later he was vindicated of the charge. He was buried in the Presbyterian Cemetery in Williamsburg, Pennsylvania.

== Legacy ==
Stultz Field in Tipton, Pennsylvania, was named in his honor.
