= Giuseppe Mario Bellanca =

Italian-American airplane designer

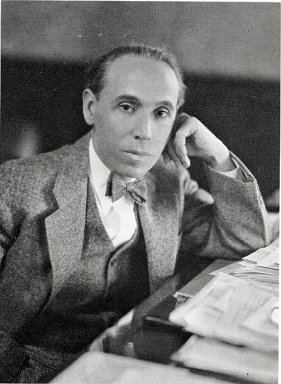
- Bellanca circa 1930
- Born: March 19, 1886; Sciacca, Italy
- Died: December 26, 1960 (aged 74); New York City, New York, U.S.
- Children: August Bellanca

Giuseppe Mario Bellanca (March 19, 1886 – December 26, 1960) was an Italian-American aviation pioneer, airplane designer and builder, who is credited with many design firsts and whose aircraft broke many aviation records. He was inducted into the National Aviation Hall of Fame in 1973. The Bellanca CF, one of the world's first enclosed-cabin monoplanes, is on display at the National Air and Space Museum. Bellanca was known mostly for his long range aircraft which led the way for the advancement of international and commercial air transportation.

== Biography ==
He was born on March 19, 1886, in Sciacca, Italy. He graduated with an engineering degree from Politecnico di Milano. He emigrated to Brooklyn in the United States in October 1911 where he operated the Bellanca Flying School (1912–1916). (Note: Bellanca taught Fiorello La Guardia how to fly in exchange for driving lessons.)

In 1913 he created the first modern aircraft design (tractor design) that featured an engine and propeller in the front with a wing in the middle and a tail to the aft, which was the opposite configuration for aircraft of the time. Bellanca's "tractor" aircraft design offered a lot of performance and safety advantages over the old standard design, and was adopted internationally as the new standard configuration for almost all following aircraft, and is the common configuration recognized today.

In 1916 Bellanca was in charge of the Maryland Pressed Steel Company aircraft division, hired for the purpose of designing and developing aircraft for World War I. Bellanca built two models of biplanes called the CD (single seater) and the CE (two seat trainer). While both models outperformed the Army Jenny biplanes, the war ended and the military was no longer interested. Maryland Pressed Steel filed for bankruptcy in 1920.

In 1921, he moved to Omaha, Nebraska, and with Victor Roos, formed the Roos-Bellanca Aircraft Company.

In 1922 he built the first enclosed-cabin monoplane. Called the Bellanca CF, this aircraft is now on display at the National Air and Space Museum's Steven F. Udvar-Hazy Center. The CF was also the first aircraft design to use "lifting struts" with a wide chord and airfoil to add strength and lift to the wings.

In January 1927 he entered into a partnership with Charles A. Levine and formed the Columbia Aircraft Corp.

Bellanca created the "Bellanca A" airfoil which could lift twice the weight of other airfoils of the time. This new airfoil sparked the era of commercial air transportation and militarily it made long range bombing possible. Bellanca used this new airfoil on the six-place WB-1 and WB-2, which were the first long range passenger planes.

On April 12–14, 1927, Clarence Chamberlin and Bert Acosta set a new world's non-refueled endurance record of 51.5 hours in the Bellanca designed WB-2. The WB-2 was renamed the Columbia, and later Miss Columbia.

Charles Lindbergh's first choice for an aircraft to cross the Atlantic with was the Columbia. Different sources claim different reasons for Lindbergh not being able to purchase the Miss Columbia, but according to Joseph Scafetta Jr., "He was turned down when Lindbergh insisted on making the transatlantic flight by himself. Bellanca and Levine thought that it was suicidal to do so because no one could stay awake alone the required number of hours to complete the flight."

The Columbia lost the race to be first across the Atlantic to Lindbergh because of a court injunction grounding the plane due to a contract dispute between Levine and a pilot named Bertaud who was supposed to be a co-pilot on the Miss Columbia for the crossing.

"On May 20th, 1927, Lindbergh took off and completed the flight to Paris. Two weeks later, the Columbia took off for Germany with Levine as a passenger. Landing in Berlin, they beat Lindbergh’s distance record. Ironically, Bellanca’s airplane had been complete several years before the Spirit of St. Louis and could have been first to cross the Atlantic had it not been for the lawsuit. Not only did the Columbia fly further than the Spirit of St. Louis, but it carried a passenger. It also had a windshield so the pilot could see ahead. This design set a standard for the modern aircraft. Bellanca appeared on the cover of Time magazine, in recognition of this achievement."

June 4, 1927, the Bellanca Columbia makes the Atlantic crossing, the first ever with a passenger. It was piloted by Clarence Chamberlin who was accompanied by Charles Levine the first passenger/co-pilot. Columbia took-off from Roosevelt Field in Long Island, New York, and landed in Eisleben, Germany, after a forty-three hour flight. They were supposed to land in Berlin, but ran out of gas. After refueling the crew arrived in Berlin where they were met by a crowd of 150,000 waving German and American flags.

On July 4, 1927, Bellanca was featured on the cover of Time.

After the short-lived partnership with Levine, Bellanca formed a new company, The Bellanca Aircraft Corporation of America in financial partnership with the du Pont family. The company would go on to develop a wide range of general aviation and light commercial aircraft. American Champion still produces products with a Bellanca lineage.

"On November 13, 1928, Bellanca received his first U.S. Patent No. 1,691,105 for an inwardly retracting landing gear that reduced drag during flight. This invention was the first fully retractable commercial landing gear ever developed and had been installed on the Rome during the previous year."

On October 3, 1931, a Bellanca model CH-400 Skyrocket named the Miss Veedol was the first aircraft to cross the Pacific non-stop. Miss Veedol flew from Samishiro Beach, Japan to Wenatchee, Washington. It was flown by Clyde Pangborn and co-piloted by Hugh Herndon Jr.

Bellanca temporarily left the Bellanca Aircraft Corporation In 1941 after a disagreement with the company directors during a corporate refinancing. Bellanca made an agreement with Andrew Jackson Higgins, president of Higgins Industries, in New Orleans to create a Bellanca Aviation department within Higgins to design cargo aircraft during World War II. The company was under a contract to the U.S. Army Air Corps.

In 1941 Bellanca designed the first "blended wing body" concept, which resembles the modern B-2 bomber but with a twin tail boom for stability and two pusher propellers and had low drag laminar flow air flow over the wing.

During World War II Bellanca Aircraft Corporation manufactured and supplied components and equipment for the U.S. Military (Army and Navy) making various parts for the Curtiss C-46 Commando, Martin B-26 Marauder, Martin JRM Mars, Curtiss SB2C Helldiver, Consolidated B-24 Liberator, Martin PBM Mariner, and Martin Baltimore."

In 1954, he formed the Bellanca Development Company.

Bellanca was granted approximately 45 patents in his career.

According to aviation historians Alan and Drina Welch Able, "G.M. Bellanca did more for general aviation than any other person during aviation's first 100 years."

He died from leukemia at Memorial Hospital in New York City on December 26, 1960.

He was inducted into the National Aviation Hall of Fame in 1973.

== Archive ==
In 1993, his papers were archived at the National Air and Space Museum.

== See also ==
- AviaBellanca Aircraft
- Charles Lindbergh
- Enea Bossi Sr.
- Clarence Chamberlin
- Victor Roos
- Charles A. Levine
- Clyde Pangborn
