= Maryland Pressed Steel Company =

- Industry: Light Aircraft Production
- Founded: March 15, 1915
- Headquarters: Hagerstown, Maryland, United States of America
- Key people: Giuseppe Mario Bellanca
- Parent: Poole Engineering and Machine Co - 1916
- Footnotes / references The New York & Hagerstown Metal Stamping Co was reorganized into the Maryland Pressed Steel Company in 1914.

Maryland Pressed Steel Company was an American aircraft manufacturer of the Bellanca CD, and CE aircraft.

The New York & Hagerstown Metal Stamping Co manufactured arms for the British and was reorganized into the Maryland Pressed Steel Company in 1914. In 1916, the Poole Engineering and Machine Co acquired the company as a division. The company produced arms for the wartime effort. The company attempted to break into the lucrative aircraft production field with the foundation of their Aircraft Department.

In 1917 during World War I, designer Giuseppe Mario Bellanca was hired to build six aircraft for the company in its factory at Hagerstown, Maryland. The two passenger 35 hp CD model biplanes were demonstrated at Towson, Maryland in August 1918 in an attempt to win a military contract. The 55 hp CE aircraft were advertised at a cost of $3500, but only one was produced after the war's end. Bellanca announced in May 1920 that it could not produce aircraft due to a shortage of engines from France. In 1921 The airplane business was sold to Bellanca and partner Victor Roos from Omaha, Nebraska forming the Roos-Bellanca Company. Bellanca left for Wright Aeronautical updating the CF design into the famous Wright WB-2, which was sold to the Columbia Aircraft Corp. Bellanca continued to produce aircraft with his own companyAviaBellanca Aircraft.

At the end of World War I, the company lost its contracts, switching production to wire wheels. It then went into receivership, where it was sold to R.J. Funkhouser & Co., who subsequently sold it to the M.P. Moller Motor Car Co. The 355,000 square feet (33,000 m^{2}) Hagerstown plant had a series of previous owners including the Crawford Bicycle Co, American Bicycle Co., Pope Manufacturing Company, and Montrose Metal Casket Company.

== Aircraft ==
Model name	First flight	Number built	Type
Bellanca CD	1919	6	Tractor Biplane
Bellanca CE	1919	1	Tractor Biplane
