= Clapham Studios =

British film studios

The Clapham Studios were a British film studios of the silent and early sound eras, located in Clapham in London. The studios were built at Cranmer Court under some railway arches, opening in 1913. Several companies used the studios during their first decade, including Holmfirth Films. In 1927, it was used for one of the first British sound films when a short film was made using the DeForest Phonofilm sound system. By the late 1920s, usage of the studio had been abandoned, as producers moved to larger and more modern studios.

A second studios also existed in Clapham founded in 1919 by Bertram Phillips, but when his major star Queenie Thomas married and temporarily retired from the acting he suddenly found he had no use for it and consequently no feature films were made there, although it continued to exist for other cinematic uses until the 1950s.

== Bibliography ==
- Warren, Patricia. British Film Studios: An Illustrated History. Batsford, 2001.
