= Oliver LeBoutillier =

American aviator and flying ace

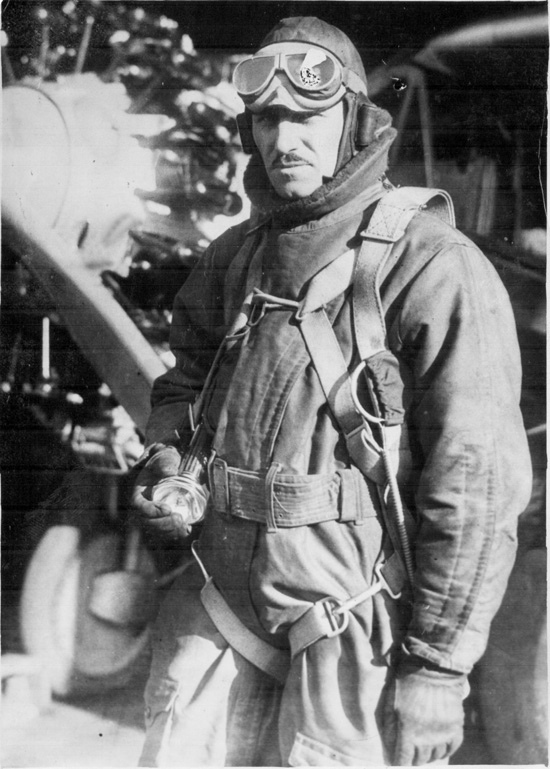
- Oliver Colin LeBoutillier, 1918
- Born: 24 May 1894; Montclair, New Jersey, United States
- Died: 12 May 1983 (aged 88); Las Vegas, Nevada, United States
- Military career
- Allegiance: United Kingdom
- Branch: Royal Naval Air Service; Royal Air Force
- Service years: 1916–1918
- Rank: Captain
- Nickname: Boots
- Units: No. 9 (Naval) Squadron RNAS; No. 85 Squadron RAF
- Conflicts: First World War
- Other work: Skywriter, stunt flyer, air racer, instructor, member of Civil Aeronautics Corporation

Oliver Colin LeBoutillier (24 May 1894 – 12 May 1983) was an American aviator and flying ace. Serving with the British Royal Naval Air Service and Royal Air Force in the First World War, LeBoutillier scored 10 aerial victories, witnessed the death of Manfred von Richthofen and was a vigorous proponent of Captain Roy Brown as the victor over Richthofen. Post war, he became a stunt pilot for movies, a skywriter, and an aviation instructor whose most famous student was Amelia Earhart. Later, he became a civil aviation inspector.

== Early life ==
LeBoutillier was born on 24 May 1894 to an English father and Canadian mother in Montclair, New Jersey.

=== First World War ===
LeBoutillier trained at the Wright Brothers Flying School in Mineola, New York. He then crossed into Canada and joined the Royal Naval Air Service on 21 August 1916 undertaking training at Redcar. By April 1917, he had joined the No. 9 Squadron Royal Naval Air Service as a sub-lieutenant to pilot a Sopwith Triplane. Between 25 May and 29 July 1917, he scored four victories by driving enemy planes down out of control.

On 1 April 1918, the Royal Naval Air Service and the Royal Flying Corps were combined into the Royal Air Force and 9 Naval became No. 209 Squadron RAF.

During a squadron dogfight on 21 April 1918 in the Somme River valley, LeBoutillier, Robert Foster, and Merrill Samuel Taylor shot down an Albatros two-seater and sparked a running dogfight during which Captain Roy Brown shot down Manfred von Richthofen. LeBoutillier said he witnessed Brown's tracer bullets penetrating Richthofen's cockpit, “to my dying day I’ll say Brownie shot him down... I saw the shots going into the cockpit.”. Immediately after its crash, LeBoutillier flew over the triplane of von Richthofen.

LeBoutillier finished the war with 10 aerial victories; one shared aircraft captured, three destroyed (including two shared), and six 'out of control' (one of which was shared). He had over 600 hours flying time in his log book by the end of the war.

== Post-war ==
Upon his return to the United States, LeBoutillier became a skywriter, and later an official of the Skywriting Corporation of America. He also became a barnstormer and piloted aircraft for eighteen movies, including: Hell's Angels and Wings. As a flight instructor, he gave Amelia Earhart her first lesson in a twin-engined aircraft. He became a Civil Aviation Authority inspector in charge of Colorado and Wyoming.

LeBoutillier died on 12 May 1983 in Las Vegas, Nevada.

== See also ==
- List of World War I flying aces from the United States
- Wilmer Stultz

== Bibliography ==
- American Aces of World War 1 Harry Dempsey. Osprey Publishing, 2001. ISBN 1-84176-375-6, ISBN 978-1-84176-375-0.
