= Thea Rasche =

Germany's first female aerobatics pilot

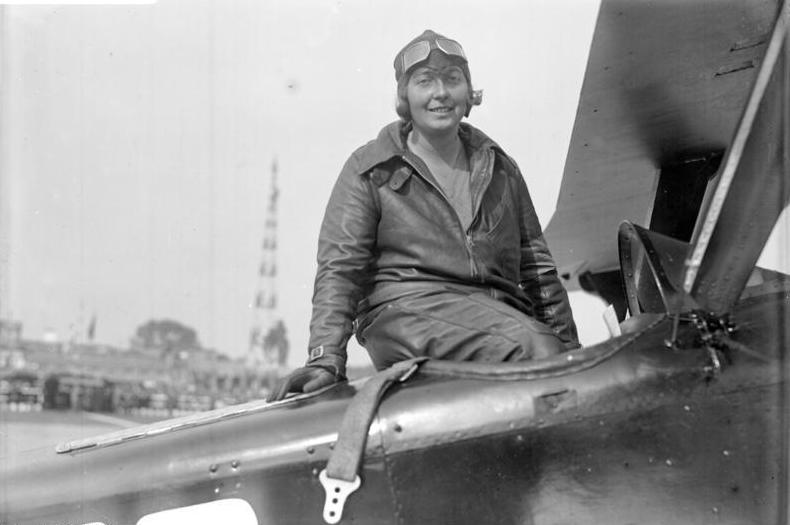
- Rasche at Berlin-Tempelhof, July 1930
- Born: Theodora Rasche; 12 August 1899; Unna, Germany
- Died: 25 February 1971 (aged 71); Rüttenscheid, Essen, West Germany
- Resting place: Friedhof Bredeney, Essen
- Occupation: Aviator
- Years active: 1925–1933

Theodora Rasche (12 August 1899 – 25 February 1971) was Germany's first female aerobatics pilot.

== Biography ==
Rasche was born in Unna, one of four children of Wilhelm Rasche (b. 1865), a brewery owner, and his wife Theodora Versteegh from Nijmegen. After attending a girls' school in Essen, she spent a year at a boarding school in Dresden, before going to the Rural School for Women in Miesbach. Rasche then worked as a secretary in Hamburg, where she became interested in flying, and in 1924 began taking lessons with Paul Bäumer at Fuhlsbüttel. In 1925, she received her pilot's license, and soon after became the first German woman to pass the aerobatic examination, flying a Udet U 12. She then participated as a pilot in air shows and competitions in Germany.

In 1927, her father bought her a BFW Flamingo, registration number D-1120, and in July, she set off for the United States, the first of five trips. Rasche first flew from Berlin to Paris (where she met Richard E. Byrd), then to London. She then flew to Southampton where Juan de la Cierva assisted in loading her aircraft aboard the SS Leviathan for the voyage to New York, alongside passengers Cdr. Byrd and Clarence Chamberlin. In the United States, Rasche took part in various competitions. On 12 August 1927, when returning to New York, she attempted to fly under a bridge at Albany, only for her engine to fail, forcing her to ditch in the Hudson River. Fortunately, her aircraft was fully insured, and she soon obtained a replacement, D-1229, from Germany. On 28 September 1927, her plane crashed at the Dennison airport in Quincy, after the motor died; she was uninjured, but the plane was damaged slightly.

In 1927 and 1928, she returned to the United States and attempted to organise a flight back to Germany across the Atlantic Ocean, but these plans came to nothing owing to a lack of financial sponsors. In 1929, Rasche took part in the Women's Air Derby, known as the "Powder Puff Derby", the first official women-only air race in the United States. She also became the first woman to join the exclusive "Quiet Birdmen" club, and was a charter member of the "Ninety-Nines", a group of 99 female pilots who fought for the advancement of women in aviation.

Rasche took part in further flying displays and flights in Germany, and in 1932 she became the first woman in Germany to be awarded a seaplane license. However, financial difficulties forced her to abandon her career as an aviator, and from 1933 she worked as the editor of the magazine Flug-Illustrierten ("Flight Magazine"). In 1934, she flew as a passenger aboard the Douglas DC-2 flown by Koene Dirk Parmentier, to report on the MacRobertson Air Race from England to Australia. In 1935, she became a freelance journalist.

Rasche remained in Germany during World War II, training as a nurse in Berlin during 1945. Rasche had joined the Nazi Party in 1933, and later became a member of the National Socialist Flyers Corps, but appeared before a Denazification Tribunal in Berlin in May 1947, which ruled that she had been only a nominal member of the party.

After the war, she lived in the United States until 1953, then returned to Germany.

Thea Rasche died in Rüttenscheid, Essen, on 25 February 1971.

There are three streets named after her in Germany: Thea-Rasche-Straße in Frankfurt, Thea-Rasche-Weg in Freudenstadt, and Thea-Rasche-Zeile in Berlin, close to Gatow Airport.
