= Walter G. R. Hinchliffe =

British WWI flying ace

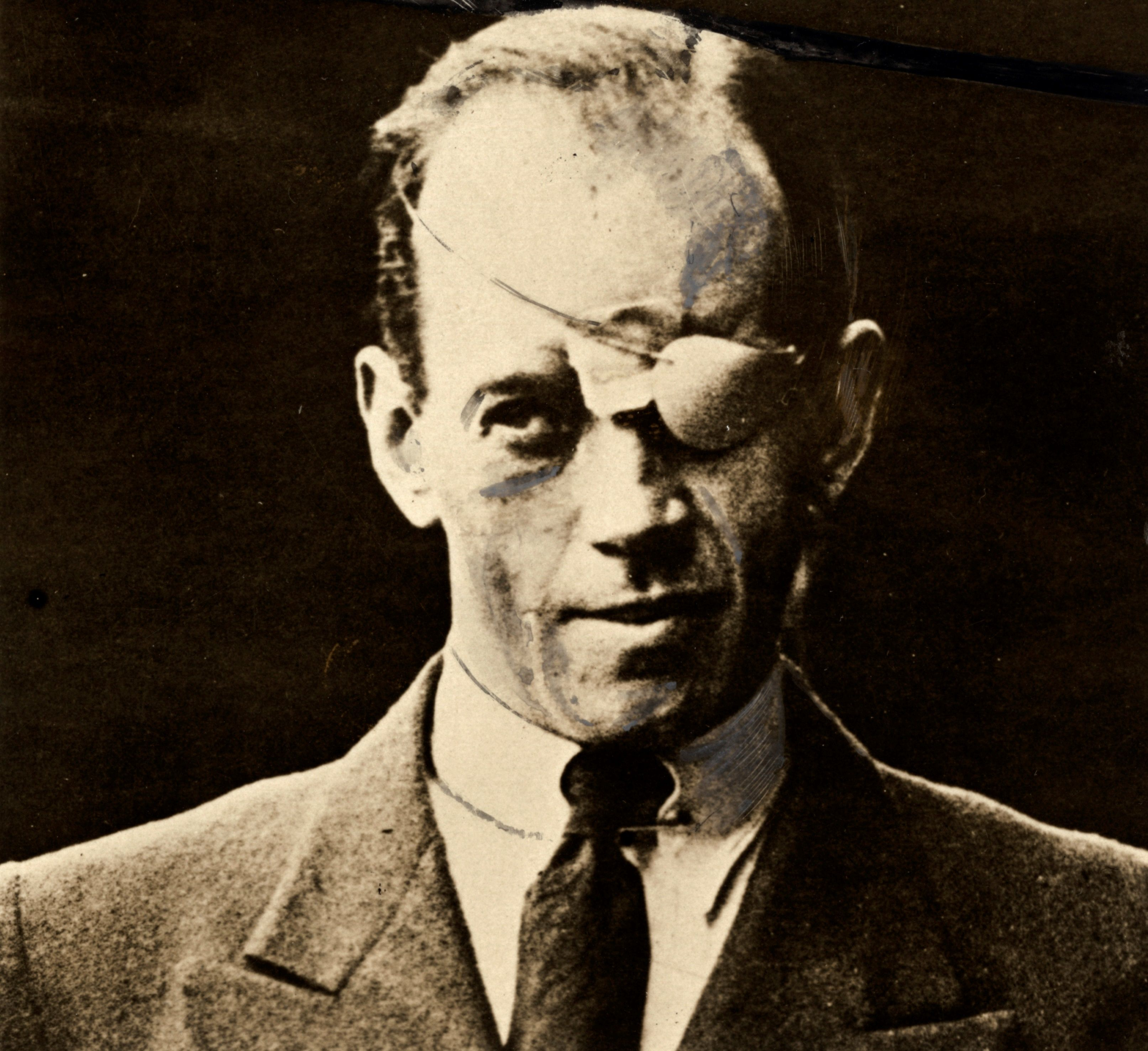
- Born: Walter George Raymond Hinchliffe; 10 June 1893; Munich, Germany
- Died: 13 March 1928 (aged 34)
- Military career
- Allegiance: United Kingdom
- Branch: British Army; Royal Air Force
- Service years: 1914–1918
- Rank: Captain
- Nicknames: Hinch, known as Raymond to his family
- Units: Royal Artillery; No. 10 Squadron RNAS/No. 210 Squadron RAF
- Awards: Distinguished Flying Cross
- Other work: Disappeared attempting east-west crossing of Atlantic Ocean

Captain Walter George Raymond Hinchliffe DFC (10 June 1893 – 13 March 1928), also known as Hinch (the surname is often incorrectly given as Hinchcliffe) was a distinguished Royal Naval Air Service and Royal Air Force flying ace in World War I who was awarded the Distinguished Flying Cross. A pioneering military and civilian flying career was cut short when he attempted a treacherous flight across the Atlantic Ocean with Elsie Mackay in a single engined Stinson Detroiter.

== Private life ==
Hinchliffe was born in Munich, Germany in 1893 to Richard George Hinchliffe (1868 - circa 1942) and Florence Williams. His younger sister Gladys was born in 1897 in Liverpool. He was educated at Liverpool College, where he was a member of the Officer Training Corps, then attended medical school, training as a dentist. He spoke four languages (including German), was an avid reader, a skilled artist, an accomplished sportsman and a skilled mechanic. He met his Dutch wife Emilie Gallizien when he was Chief Pilot of the Royal Dutch Airlines (KLM) and she was assistant to the company's General Manager.

His brother in law F. C. Lay was the first Pupil to become head master at the City of Oxford High School for Boys.

== Military career ==
Hinchliffe was commissioned as a second lieutenant in the North Lancashire Brigade Company, West Lancashire Divisional Transport and Supply Column (Territorial Army) of the British Army Service Corps on 20 March 1912, and promoted lieutenant on 17 September 1914. He is then believed to have served in the Royal Artillery from 1914–16 before joining the Royal Naval Air Service where he underwent training at Redcar, Cranwell and Frieston.

Gaining his Royal Aero Club Certificate in September 1916 as Flight Sub-Lieutenant, Royal Naval Air Service, he served as an Instructor at Cranwell before joining 10 Squadron RNAS in January 1918 to commence active service. During February and March his successful sorties in a Sopwith Camel named Allo Lil Bird included bombing raids and downing two enemy aircraft in dogfights at Rumbeke and Roulers.

When the Royal Air Force was formed on 1 April 1918, he was appointed Lieutenant (Honorary Captain) RAF in the (renamed) No. 210 Squadron RAF. Within three months he had shot down a further five enemy aircraft, at Roulers, Bailleul, Neuve-Église, Armentières and Hazebrouck. During the Hazebrouck night encounter he was shot through the forehead and crashed at Nieppe Forest (Dickebusch Lake). He suffered severe facial injuries and lost the sight in his left eye for which he wore a patch for the rest of his life. For his exploits he was awarded the Distinguished Flying Cross. He was transferred to the RAF unemployed list on 21 August 1919. He was initially hospitalised on 23 June 1918 and then invalided home on 27 June and treated at a hospital in central Hampstead.

== Post war ==
After the War he became a widely experienced pilot, pioneering, opening and flying many civilian routes for both KLM and Imperial Airways. In 1920 he made the first airmail flight from the Netherlands to England. In 1921 he made the first civilian passenger night-flights from Lympne to Amsterdam, and Amsterdam to Berlin. His new routes included Amsterdam-Gelsenkirchen-Dortmund-London-Amsterdam in 11 hours flying time and Berlin-Amsterdam-London-Lowestoft-Lympne in just over 12 hours flying time. During 1922-1923 he was Chief Pilot of KLM.

In 1923 he joined Instone Air Line covering Denmark, Germany, the Netherlands, Belgium, London and Paris, and after the merger into Imperial Airways he flew a De Havilland Hercules to Cairo and opened up the Imperial Airways Eastern route.

His flying experience included over 40 types of aircraft including; Avro, British Aerial Transport, Bleriot, Bristol F2b, Caudron, Curtis, De Havilland, Fokker, Grahame-White Boxkite, Handley-Page, Nieuport, Pemberton-Billing Scout, Sopwith Camel, Sopwith Dolphin, Sopwith 1½ Strutter, Sopwith Pup, Vickers Vimy and Vickers Vulcan.

In September 1927, Hinchliffe, having agreed to pilot the Columbia, Charles A. Levine's plane back to the U.S. (replacing Clarence Chamberlin who had flown Levine from the U.S. to Germany), the two flew from Cranwell Airdrome in England with Delhi, India as their destination. After battling winds and a faulty fuel pump for 10 hours, the duo landed safely in Vienna. Hinchliffe returned to his employment with Imperial Airways. Levine would return to the U.S. aboard the steamer, Leviathan in October. Hinchliffe and Levine were filmed at the Clapham Studios in London for a short film made in the DeForest Phonofilm sound-on-film process before their departure for India.

== Transatlantic Flight ==
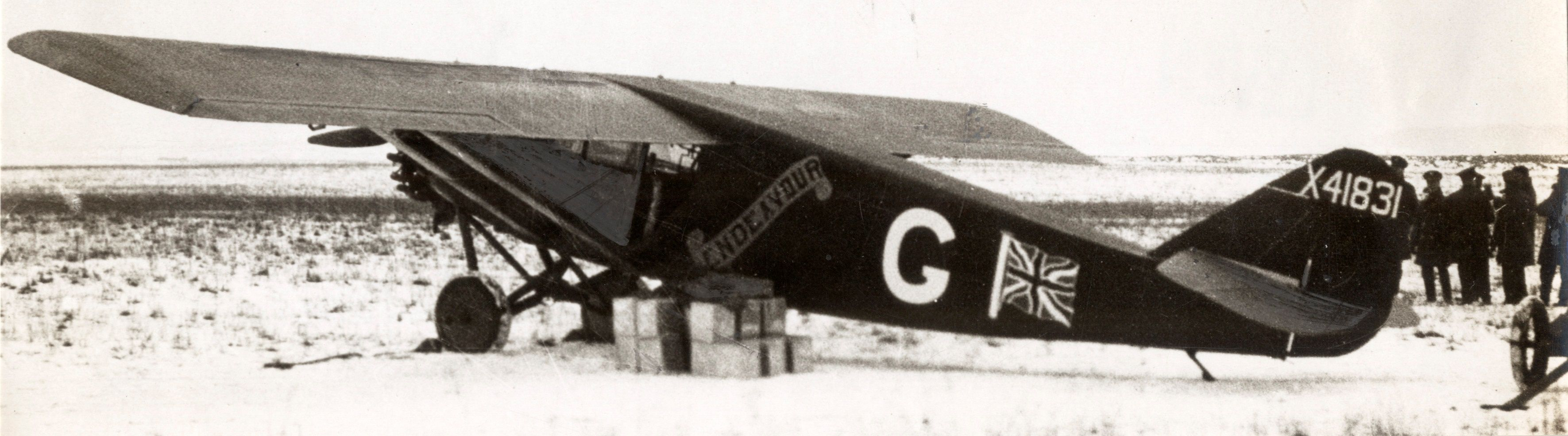
Endeavour

Hinchliffe's peerless reputation made him the natural choice for pilot when Elsie Mackay attempted to achieve her ambition to be the first woman to fly across the Atlantic Ocean. The daughter of P & O chairman James Mackay, 1st Earl of Inchcape had bought a Stinson Detroiter, and had it shipped from the USA to England and delivered to the Brooklands motor racing track, which at the time was also used as an airfield. Named Endeavour, it was a monoplane with gold tipped wings and a black fuselage, powered by a 9 cylinder, 300 h.p. Wright Whirlwind J-6-9 (R-975) engine, with a cruising speed of 84 mph.

In early March 1928 the Daily Express discovered that Captain Hinchliffe and Elsie were preparing for a transatlantic attempt by carrying out test flights at RAF Cranwell and were staying at The George Hotel in Leadenham, near Grantham. The story was silenced by Elsie's threatened legal action as she intended to depart in secret while her father was in Egypt, having promised her family she would not make the attempt. The Irish Times reported on 14 March 1928 "Captain Hinchcliffe and Captain Joynson-Wreford were at Baldonnel Aerodrome about a fortnight ago, and, although no absolute definite arrangements were made, it was understood that he would make the aerodrome the headquarters for his Transatlantic attempt."

At 08:35am on 13 March 1928 Endeavour took off from RAF Cranwell, Lincolnshire, with minimal fuss as Walter had told only two friends and Elsie had registered under the pseudonym of 'Gordon Sinclair'. Approximately five hours later, at 13.30pm the Chief lighthouse keeper at Mizen Head on the south west coast of Cork Ireland saw the monoplane over the village of Crookhaven, on the great circle course for Newfoundland. A French steamer later reported seeing them still on course, but nothing else is known. A crowd of 5,000 is reputed to have waited at Mitchel Field, Long Island. In December 1928, eight months later, a single piece of identifiable undercarriage washed ashore in North West Ireland.

== See also ==
- List of people who disappeared mysteriously at sea

== Bibliography ==
- Norman Franks, Sopwith Camel Aces of World War I
- John G. Fuller, The Airmen Who Would Not Die
