= J. Erroll Boyd =

Canadian American aviation pioneer (1891-1960)

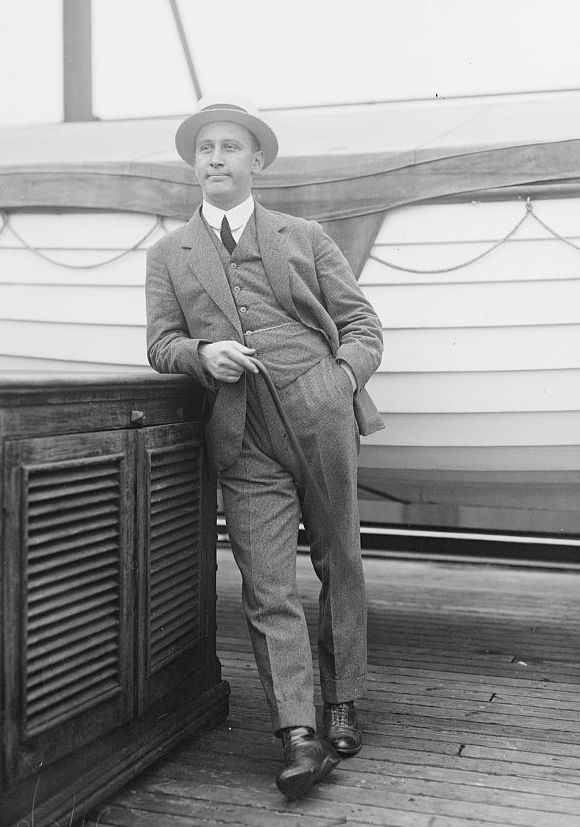
- Boyd in 1916
- Born: James Erroll Dunsford Boyd; November 22, 1891; Toronto, Ontario, Canada
- Died: November 27, 1960 (aged 69); Sharon, Connecticut, U.S.
- Other names: James Erroll Boyd; J. Erroll Boyd; James E. Boyd; Erroll Boyd
- Occupation: Aviator

James Erroll Dunsford Boyd (November 22, 1891 – November 27, 1960) was a pioneering Canadian aviator. He was known as the "Lindbergh of Canada" before becoming an American citizen in 1941.

== Biography ==
James Erroll Dunsford Boyd, known to his family and friends as "Erroll", was born on November 22, 1891, in Toronto, Ontario, Canada. During World War I he was a flyer with the Royal Naval Air Service.

On October 9–10, 1930, Boyd became the first Canadian to fly an airplane from Canada to England (Harbour Grace to Tresco, Isles of Scilly).

He became an American citizen on March 28, 1941, in Hartford, Connecticut.

Boyd died on November 27, 1960, in Sharon, Connecticut. He was buried in Pompano Beach South Lawn Cemetery in Pompano Beach, Florida.

== Awards and honours ==
In 2017, Boyd was posthumously inducted into the Canada's Aviation Hall of Fame.
