= Wooster and Davis =

Trans-Atlantic flight team

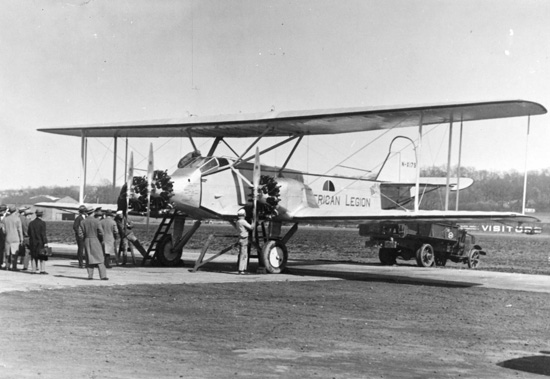
Wooster and Davis's K-47 Keystone Pathfinder.

Wooster and Davis -- Lieutenant Stanton Hall Wooster (April 1, 1895, Connecticut – April 26, 1927) and Lieutenant Commander Noel Guy Davis (December 25, 1891, Salt Lake City, Utah – April 26, 1927) were two United States Navy (USN) airmen who made an attempt to fly the Atlantic Ocean from New York to Paris in the spring of 1927. The men were trying to win the $25,000 Orteig Prize offered by New York hotelier Raymond Orteig for the first nonstop flight between New York and Paris. Competitors for the prize were French World War One ace Rene Fonck and his crew of three, USN Commander Richard Evelyn Byrd, Clarence Chamberlain with plane owner Charles Levine, and a young airmail pilot named Charles Lindbergh. On the Paris side of the Atlantic their competitors were another World War One French ace, Charles Nungesser, and his navigator Francois Coli.

Wooster and Davis flew a Keystone Pathfinder (N-X179) plane called American Legion. Newsreel footage taken of the men and their plane are extant and record the duo's goings-on during that spring of 1927. While testing with a heavy load of gas on April 26, 1927, the Pathfinder lost altitude and crashed on its nose in Virginia, killing both men. The eventual victor of the Orteig prize was Charles Lindbergh three weeks later.
