= Sikorsky S-35 =

American airplane by Sikorsky Aircraft

S-35
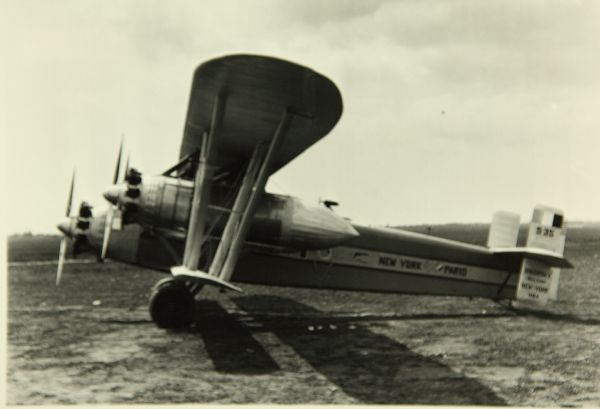

General information
- Type: Transatlantic sesquiplane
- National origin: United States
- Manufacturer: Sikorsky Manufacturing Company
- Number built: 1

History
- First flight: August 23, 1926

The Sikorsky S-35 was an American triple-engined sesquiplane transport later modified to use three-engines. It was designed and built by the Sikorsky Manufacturing Company for an attempt by René Fonck on a non-stop Atlantic crossing for the Orteig Prize. It was destroyed in the attempt.

== Design and development ==
The S-35 was designed as a twin-engined transport with a 1,000-mile (1,600-kilometre) range. During 1926 René Fonck, a French First World War fighter ace, was looking for a multi-engine aircraft to enter a competition to be the first to fly non-stop from New York to Paris. Raymond Orteig offered a prize of $25,000. Fonck had Sikorsky redesign the aircraft with three engines.

The S-35 was a sesquiplane with a fixed tail-skid landing gear. It was modified to take three 425 hp (317 kW) Gnome-Rhône Jupiter 9A (Note: A license-built copy of a design by the aero-engine subsidiary of Bristol Aeroplane Company) radial engines and fitted with jettisonable auxiliary landing gear directly under the fuselage to support its weight at takeoff. Fuel was carried in tanks in the upper wing leading edge, the engine nacelles, and the fuselage. Fuel was pumped up to the wing tanks from which it fed the engines under gravity. The wing tanks alone gave four hours flight time. As it was designed for passenger and transport use, the cabin behind the cockpit (described as "exceptionally large and roomy") was 4 ft (1.2 m) wide by 6 ft (1.8 m) high and 15 ft 6 in (4.72 m) long accessed by a door at the rear.

These modifications took time to complete and the aircraft first flew on 23 August 1926 from Roosevelt Field. Sikorsky started a series of test flights but as none were at the maximum takeoff weight of 24,200 lb (11,000 kg), Sikorsky wanted to delay the transatlantic crossing until early 1927, but the promoters of the flight would not accept a delay and the aircraft was prepared for the crossing. Speaking after the accident to the French press, Fonck said that he had completed 27 hours test flying the S.35 at various weights including 280 passengers over the period.

== Operational history ==
The first transatlantic attempt was scheduled for the September 16 but was abandoned after the aircraft developed a fuel leak. The next available break in the weather was to be the 21 September and the aircraft was fueled during the previous night from 50 barrels of gasoline. When the aircraft was weighed it was found to be 4,000 pounds (1,800 kg) overweight. Fonck insisted on carrying a sofa and refrigerator on the journey. Fonck and his co-pilot Lt Lawrence Curtin of the U.S. Navy were joined by a radio operator and a Sikorsky mechanic for the flight. (Note: Flight gave the originally announced crew accompanying Fonck as "Lieut. Allan Snody, U S. Navy (navigator), Capt. Homer Berry (second pilot), and Capt. John Irwin (wireless operator)")

Departure was scheduled for sunrise and the takeoff began at 6:36. In front of a large crowd at Roosevelt Field the aircraft gathered speed, the auxiliary landing gear broke away, the aircraft failed to get airborne and plunged down a steep slope at the end of the runway and burst into flames. The two pilots escaped injury but the radio operator Charles Clavier and mechanic Jacob Islamoff were killed in the fire. The aircraft, which had cost $80,000, was not insured.

== Specifications (for Atlantic flight) ==
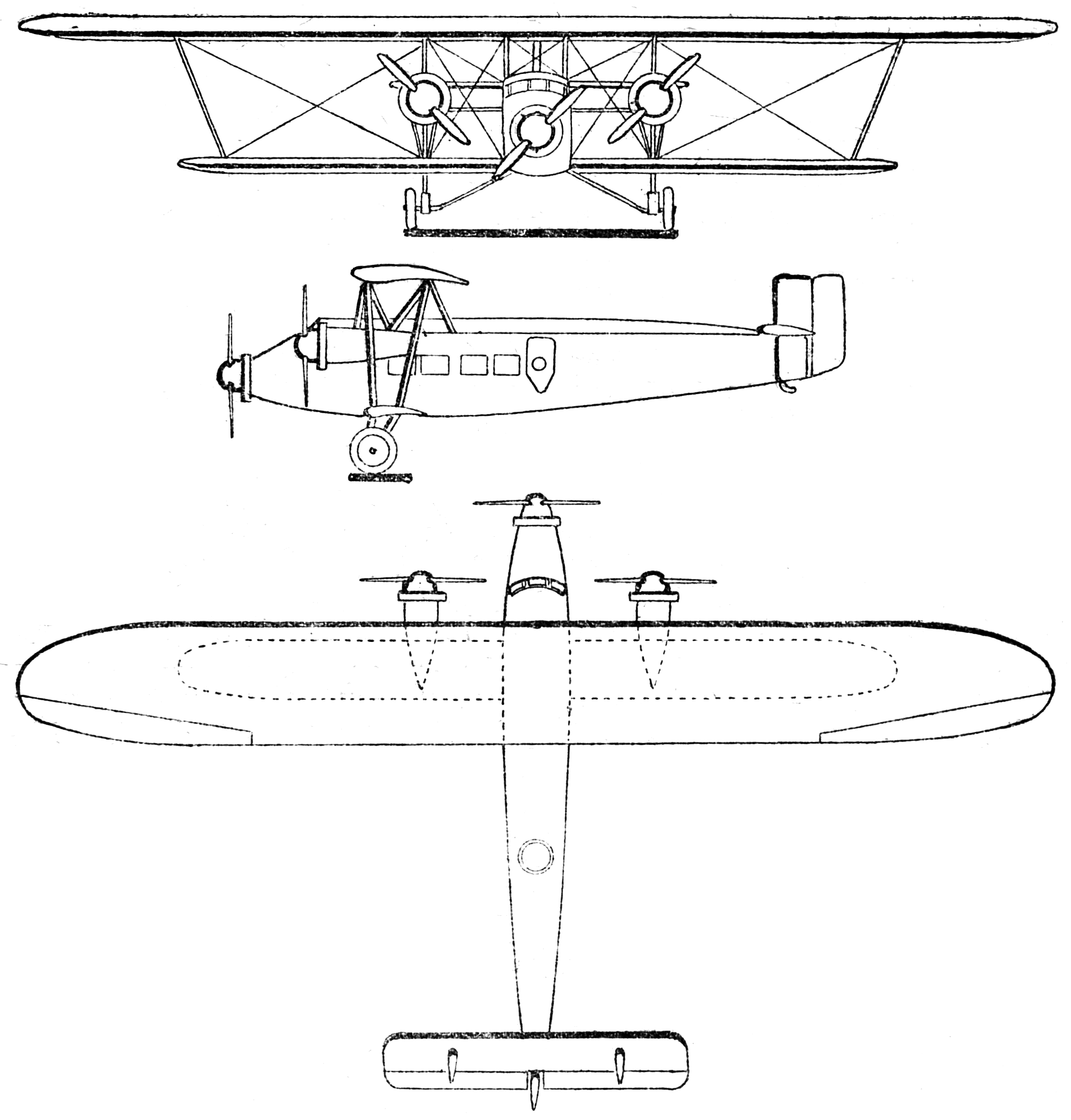
Sikorsky S-35 3-view drawing from Les Ailes, June 24, 1926

Data from Best

General characteristics

- Crew: four
- Length: 44 ft 0 in (13.41 m)
- Upper wingspan: 101 ft 0 in (30.78 m)
- Lower wingspan: 76 ft 0 in (23.16 m)
- Height: 16 ft 0 in (4.88 m)
- Wing area: 1,095 sq ft (101.7 m^{2})
- Empty weight: 9,700 lb (4,400 kg) (Note: Flight gives 8,000 lb (3,600 kg) with a further 490 lb (220 kg) "equipment")
- Gross weight: 20,000 lb (9,072 kg)
- Max takeoff weight: 24,200 lb (11,000 kg)
- Fuel capacity: 15,200 lb (6,900 kg)
- Powerplant: 3 × Gnome-Rhône Jupiter 9A radial engine, 425 hp (317 kW) each (Note: Flight gives 400 hp (300 kW))
- Propellers: 2-bladed, 10 ft 6 in (3.20 m) diameter

Performance

- Maximum speed: 145 mph (233 km/h, 126 kn)
- Endurance: 7 hours
- Service ceiling: 16,800 ft (5,100 m)
- Wing loading: 21.8 lb/sq ft (106 kg/m^{2})
- Power/mass: 19 lb/hp

== See also ==
Aircraft of comparable role, configuration, and era

- Keystone K-47 Pathfinder

== Bibliography ==
- Laureau, Patrick (February 2000). "La première tentative de traversée de l'Atlantique (1926): L'écheque du Sikorsky S-35" [The First Tentative Attempts to Cross the Atlantique: The Failure of the Sikorsky S-35]. Avions: Toute l'aéronautique et son histoire (in French) (83): 38–43. ISSN 1243-8650.
- "The Sikorsky S.35". Flight. Vol. XVIII, no. 39. 30 September 1926. pp. 638–640 – via Internet Archive.
