= Hotel Lafayette (New York City) =

Demolished hotel in Manhattan, New York

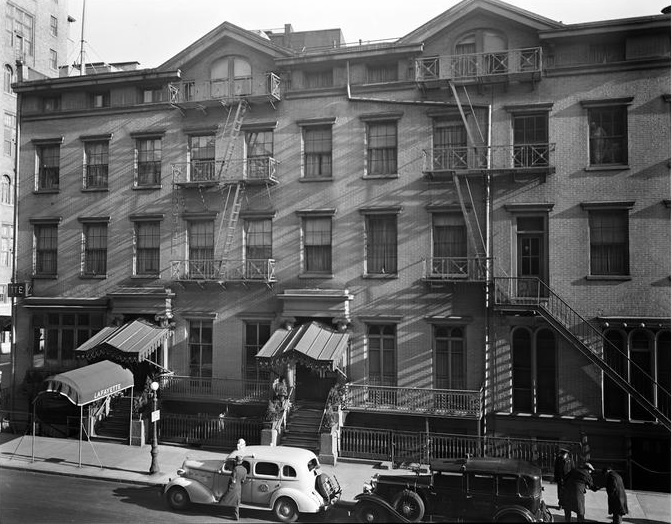
- The Hotel Lafayette in 1937
- Established: 1902
- Dissolved: 1949
- Location: University Place, Manhattan, New York City
- Coordinates: 40°43′55″N 73°59′39″W
- Owner: Raymond Orteig
- Formerly called: Hotel Martin

Hotel Lafayette (formerly Hotel Martin) was a hotel located on University Place in the Greenwich Village neighborhood of Manhattan, New York City. It was founded by Raymond Orteig in 1902. The hotel was particularly known for its restaurant, the Café Lafayette, and drew its clientele from New York's French expatriates and the bohemians of Greenwich Village. John Reed described the hotel as "the real link between the old Village and the new, since it was the cradle of artistic life in New York." After Orteig's retirement in 1929, the 65-room hotel and its restaurant were run by his sons until its closure in 1949. The building was demolished in the late 1950s.

== History ==
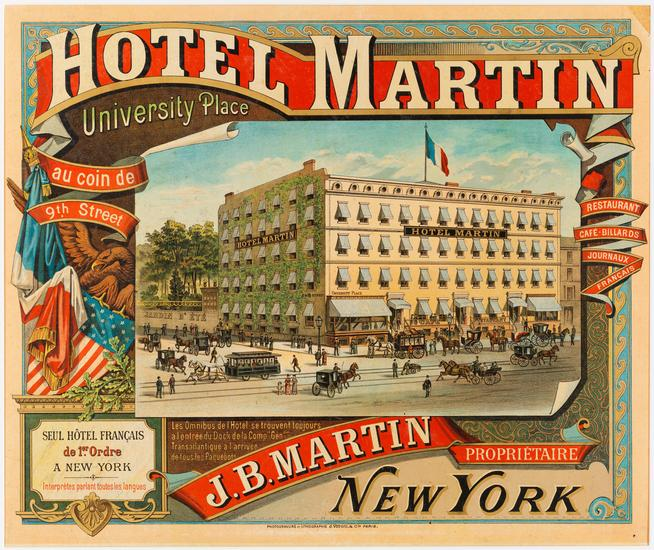
Advertisement for the Hotel Martin from the late 1880s

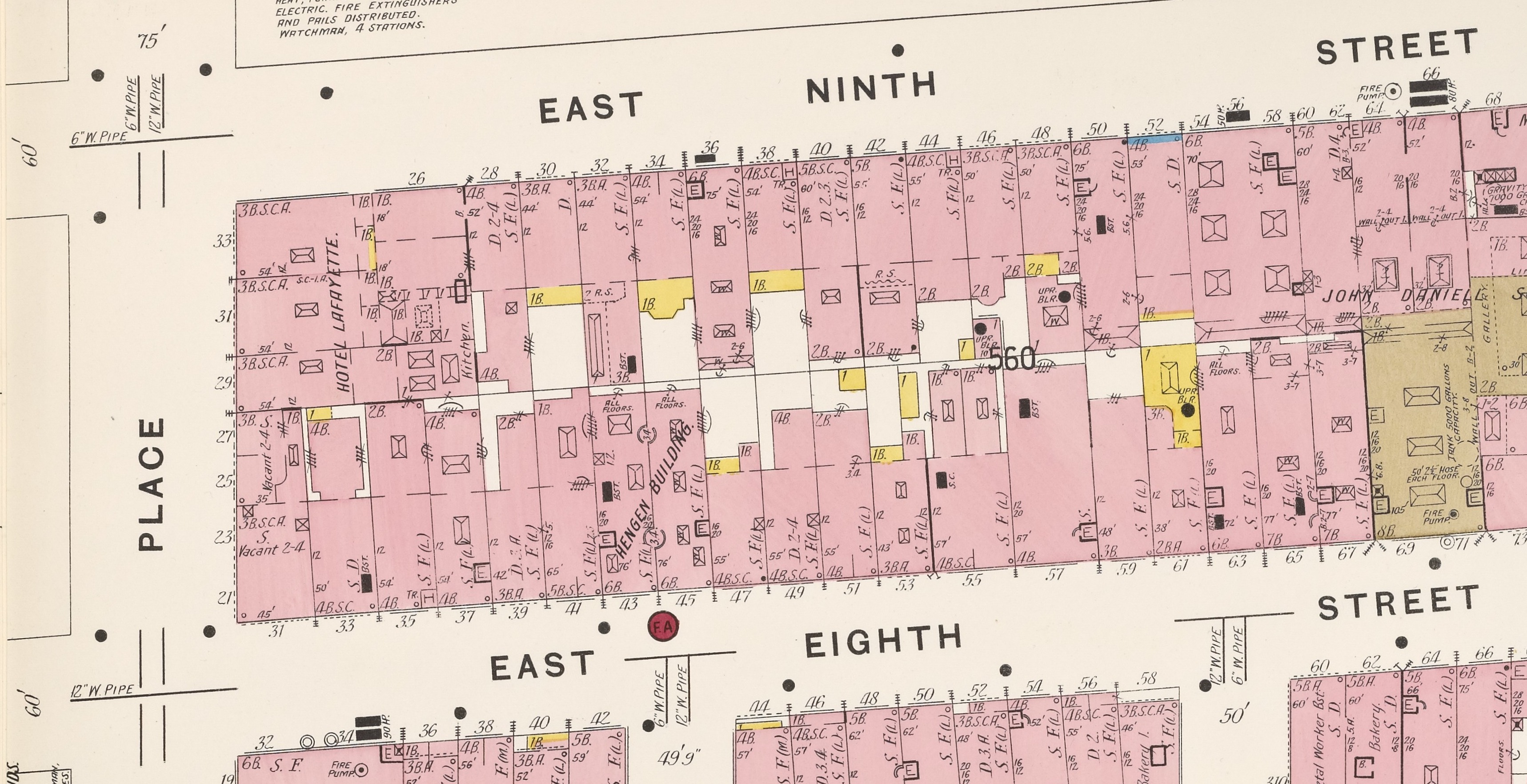
Hotel Lafayette (upper left), SE corner of University Place and East Ninth Street, on a map published in 1904

The Hotel Lafayette began its life as Hotel Martin. In 1883, Jean-Baptiste Martin, who had previously run a hotel in Panama, bought a small pension on University Place run by Eugene Larru and opened it under the name Hotel de Panama. Three years later, he changed its name to Hotel Martin. According to Martin, he decided on the name change because: "Panama gave people a bad impression. They associated it with fever and Spaniards, and neither were popular." In the ensuing years, Martin took over the adjoining houses and built extensions until the small pension became a large building.

A late 1880s advertisement for the Martin described it as "the only first-class French hotel in New York." In addition to the artists and writers of Greenwich Village, the Martin's clients over the years included the opera singers Jean and Édouard de Reszke, Pol Plançon and Nelly Melba, as well as the painter Théobald Chartran, the violinist Eugène Ysaÿe, and the French statesman Jules Cambon.

At the turn of the 20th century, Martin decided to open a restaurant on 26th Street near Madison Square Park, and in 1902 sold the hotel's lease to Raymond Orteig, who had been the head waiter at the Café Martin. Orteig immediately renamed it Hotel Lafayette after General Lafayette, the French aristocrat and military officer who had fought in the American Revolutionary War. However, for many years the Lafayette remained informally known as "Old Martin's".

Orteig retained the Hotel Martin's French restaurant, which had its own entrance on the corner of University Place and 9th Street. Rechristened Café Lafayette, it had a tile floor and marble-topped tables, some of which were placed outside on warm days, and was stocked with foreign newspapers and board games. Adjoining it were a more formal restaurant, where an orchestra played in the evening, and several private dining rooms. Orteig subscribed to the Paris weekly Brasserie Universelle and introduced its latest dishes in his restaurant. The Lafayette was particularly known for its mixed hors d'oeuvres, squab in casserole, filet mignon in bearnaise sauce, and pears flamed in a secret blend of French liqueurs.

A bust of General Lafayette by Houdon was displayed in the hotel lobby, and from the late 1920s, the foyer was decorated with memorabilia from Charles Lindbergh's 1927 flight in the Spirit of St. Louis from New York to Paris. It was the first solo transatlantic flight and the first non-stop flight between North America and the European mainland. In the process, Lindbergh won the Orteig Prize. Raymond Orteig first became interested in aviation during World War I and its immediate aftermath, when the Lafayette became a favorite gathering place for American and French airmen. The American flag that Lindbergh had carried on his flight had hung on the wall of the Café Lafayette until November 1941. At that point, Orteig's son moved it to a private office in the hotel, explaining to The New York Times: "Too many pros and cons. Particularly for a restaurant. The flag hung there since 1927 when Lindbergh was an aviator and everyone was proud of him. But now he's talking politics. (Note: In 1940 Lindbergh had become the spokesman of the America First Committee, which opposed American entry into World War II. At one point, President Roosevelt accused him of being a Nazi sympathizer.) And lately when people noticed the flag a discussion began."

After his retirement in 1929, Orteig's three sons, Raymond Jr., Jean Blaise, and Evariste, ran the Lafayette until its closure in 1949. Their father died in 1939.

== Closure ==
The Lafayette's building was owned by the Sailors' Snug Harbor Trust. When the building's lease came up for renewal in 1949, the Orteig brothers were unable to negotiate terms with the Snug Harbor trustees which would have kept the Layfayette economically viable. The hotel and its restaurant closed on March 31, 1949, when the last dinner was served at the Café Lafayette. Among the last hotel guests to check out were the author Elliot Paul and the artist Niles Spencer. Among the last-night diners who had filled the café were actor Winston Ross, (Note: Winston Ross (1912–1997) was a Broadway stage actor and singer. He was the brother of Lanny Ross.) cartoonist Dorothy McKay, (Note: Dorothy Jones McKay (1904–1974) was a cartoonist and illustrator, particularly known for her cartoons in Esquire.) producer Gilbert Miller, and Lady Hubert Wilkins who was writing an article on the Lafayette's closure for Australian Consolidated Press. That evening several of the café's habitués bought items from the hotel, including its barber pole. The remainder of the Lafayette's fixtures and furnishings were sold during a three-day auction which began on April 26.

In October 1949, New York University Law School took out a short-term lease on the old Lafayette building to rehouse tenants from a nearby apartment house which they were planning to demolish to make way for a new law center. The Lafayette building itself was demolished in 1957 to make way for a 12-story apartment building.
