= Roosevelt Field (airport) =

Former commercial and naval airport in New York state

Roosevelt Field Hazelhurst Field Hempstead Plains Aerodrome
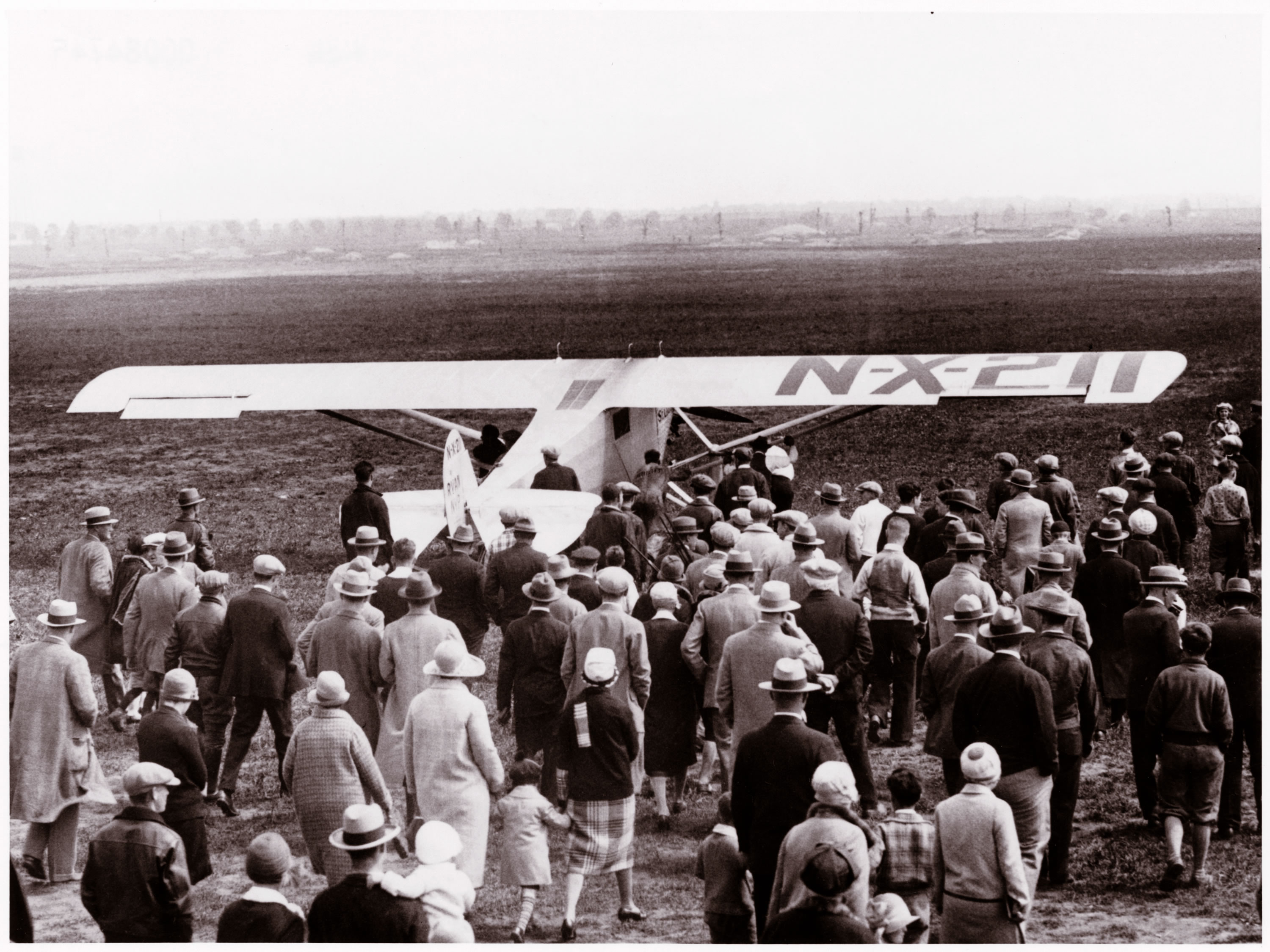
- Nearly a thousand people assembled at Roosevelt Field to see Charles Lindbergh take off in the Spirit of St. Louis, May 20, 1927
- IATA: none; ICAO: none

Summary
- Closed: 1951
- Built: 1909
- In use: 1909–1951
- Commander: Training Section, Air Service (1916–1920)
- Occupants: Air Service, United States Army World War I (1916–1920)
- Coordinates: 40°44′25″N 73°36′48″W

Map
- Roosevelt Field, New York Roosevelt Field (Long Island)

Roosevelt Field is a former airport, located in the East Garden City section of Uniondale, on Long Island, New York, United States. Originally called the Hempstead Plains Aerodrome, or sometimes Hempstead Plains field or the Garden City Aerodrome, it was a training field (Hazelhurst Field) for the Air Service, United States Army during World War I.

In 1919, it was renamed in honor of President Theodore Roosevelt's son, Quentin, who was killed in air combat during World War I.

Roosevelt Field was the takeoff point for many historic flights in the early history of aviation, including Charles Lindbergh's 1927 solo transatlantic flight. It was also used by other pioneering aviators, including Amelia Earhart and Wiley Post.

== History ==
The Hempstead Plains Aerodrome originally covered 900–1,000 acres (364–405 ha) east of and abutting Clinton Road, south of and adjacent to Old Country Road, and west of Merrick Avenue. A bluff 15 feet in elevation divided the plain into two large fields.

The west field was used first for aviation and had been intended for use during a 1910 international aviation meet, but that event was moved to Belmont Park instead. In 1911, Phillip Wilcox was named general manager of the Moisant Aviation School, the first flight school in the United States, whose facilities were located in the east field, a "circular stretch 250 feet in width and five miles long," with 25 hangars and a branch station of the Long Island Railroad.

The U.S. Army Signal Corps established the Signal Corps Aviation Station, Mineola, on the west field in July 1916, as a pilot training school for members of the National Guard.

=== World War I ===
When the U.S. entered the war in April 1917, the entire field was taken over and renamed Hazelhurst Field after Leighton Wilson Hazelhurst Jr. Hazelhurst was a native of Georgia and was a graduate of the United States Military Academy. He reported for aeronautical duty at the Signal Corps Aviation School, Augusta, Georgia, on March 2, 1912. On June 11, 1912, while making a flight at College Park, Maryland, as a passenger in an airplane undergoing acceptance tests, the plane crashed to the ground and both the pilot and Lt. Hazelhurst were killed.

An adjacent tract of land south of the Hempstead branch line of the Long Island Rail Road was acquired for expansion, becoming Camp Mills along Clinton Road and Hazelhurst Aviation Field No. 2 to the east, part of the massive Air Service Aviation Concentration Center. Hazelhurst Field No. 2 was renamed Mitchel Field on July 16, 1918, to commemorate John Purroy Mitchel, the former mayor of New York killed in a flying accident on July 6, 1918, while training with the U.S. Air Service in Louisiana. On September 24, 1918, the Army dedicated the eastern portion of Hazelhurst Field No. 1 as Roosevelt Field.

Air Service units that assigned to Hazelhurst Field were:

Permanently assigned

- 46th Aero Squadron (II), July 1918-January 1919
- 52d Aero Squadron (II), July–November 1918

Assigned to Aviation Concentration Center for deployment to AEF

- 168th Aero Squadron, December 1917-January 1918

Transferred to Port of Entry, Hoboken. NJ (AEF)

- 170th Aero Squadron, February–March 1918

Transferred to Port of Entry, Hoboken, NJ (AEF)

- 213th Aero Squadron, December 1917-January 1918

Transferred to Port of Entry, Hoboken, NJ (AEF)

- 220th Aero Squadron, March 1918

Transferred to Port of Entry, Hoboken, NJ (AEF)

- 369th Aero Squadron, January–February 1918

Transferred to Port of Entry, Hoboken, NJ (AEF)

- 370th Aero Squadron, January–February 1918

Transferred to Port of Entry, Hoboken, NJ (AEF)

- 371st Aero Squadron, January–February 1918

Transferred to Port of Entry, Hoboken, NJ (AEF)

- 372d Aero Squadron, January–February 1918

Transferred to Port of Entry, Hoboken, NJ (AEF)

- 374th Aero Squadron, February–March 1918

Transferred to Port of Entry, Halifax, NS (AEF)

- 822d Aero Squadron, March–April 1918

Transferred to Port of Entry, Hoboken, NJ (AEF)

- 15th Construction Company, July–August 1918

Transferred to Port of Entry, Hoboken, NJ (AEF)

Returning to United States from Europe

- 141st Aero Squadron, July 1919 (Demobilization)
- 497th Aero Squadron, April 1919 (Demobilization)
- 505th Aero Squadron, January 1919 (Demobilization)

First Atlantic crossing by air in both directions

On the morning of July 5, 1919, the British R34 (airship) landed after having crossed the Atlantic as the first aircraft to cross in the east–west direction. It later returned to Britain, being the first aircraft to complete an Atlantic crossing in both directions.

After the armistice, the Air Service authorized several companies to operate from the fields but maintained control until July 1, 1920, at which time the government sold its buildings and improvements and relinquished control of the property.

=== Civil use ===
Once in civilian hands, the owners sold portions along the southern edge of the field and split the remainder of the property into two separate areas. Curtiss Field, a 300-acre (120 ha) airport on the original site of Hazelhurst Field, occupied half of the western portion along Clinton Road. Roosevelt Field occupied the remainder, consisting of seven hangars and a large parking ramp adjacent to Curtiss Field, and an east–west packed clay runway 5,000 feet (1,500 m) in length on the bluff. The area between Curtiss Field and the Long Island Motor Parkway, which ran north of and parallel to Stewart Avenue, became the Old Westbury Golf Course, while the area to the east of the golf course was used as the Meadow Brook Polo Field. Both areas are now completely developed.

In pursuit of the Orteig Prize, René Fonck attempted to take off in the Sikorsky S-35 from Roosevelt Field's long runway on September 21, 1926, but the aircraft was severely overweight and stressed the auxiliary landing gear mounted to help support the load, losing a wheel. Unable to gain lift speed, the plane cartwheeled off the end of the bluff and burst into flames, killing two of its crew. The following May, operating from a hangar at Curtiss Field, Charles Lindbergh used the Roosevelt Field runway for the takeoff of the Spirit of St. Louis on his flight to Paris.

Both fields were bought in 1929 by Roosevelt Field, Inc. The western field, called "Unit 2", and the runway atop the bluff, called "Unit 1", were connected by a broad earthen taxi ramp and the consolidated property was named Roosevelt Field. Unit 1 was sold in 1936 and became the Roosevelt Raceway, while Unit 2 continued to operate as an aviation center under the name Roosevelt Field. At its peak in the 1930s, it was America's busiest civilian airfield.

=== Closure ===
Roosevelt Field was used by the Navy and Army during World War II. After the war, Roosevelt Field reverted to operation as a commercial airport until it was acquired by real estate developers in 1950. The field closed on May 31, 1951.

The eastern field first became an industrial park but is now largely retail shopping, including the Mall at The Source on the site of the former runway, and townhouses, while the site of the original flying field in 1911–1916 has become a shopping mall.

== Fresco ==
Aline Rhonie Hofheimer (1909–1963), painted a 126-foot (38 m) long fresco representing aviation history on Long Island that was displayed in Hangar F beginning in 1938 and was later relocated to the Vaughn College of Aeronautics and Technology in Queens, NY.

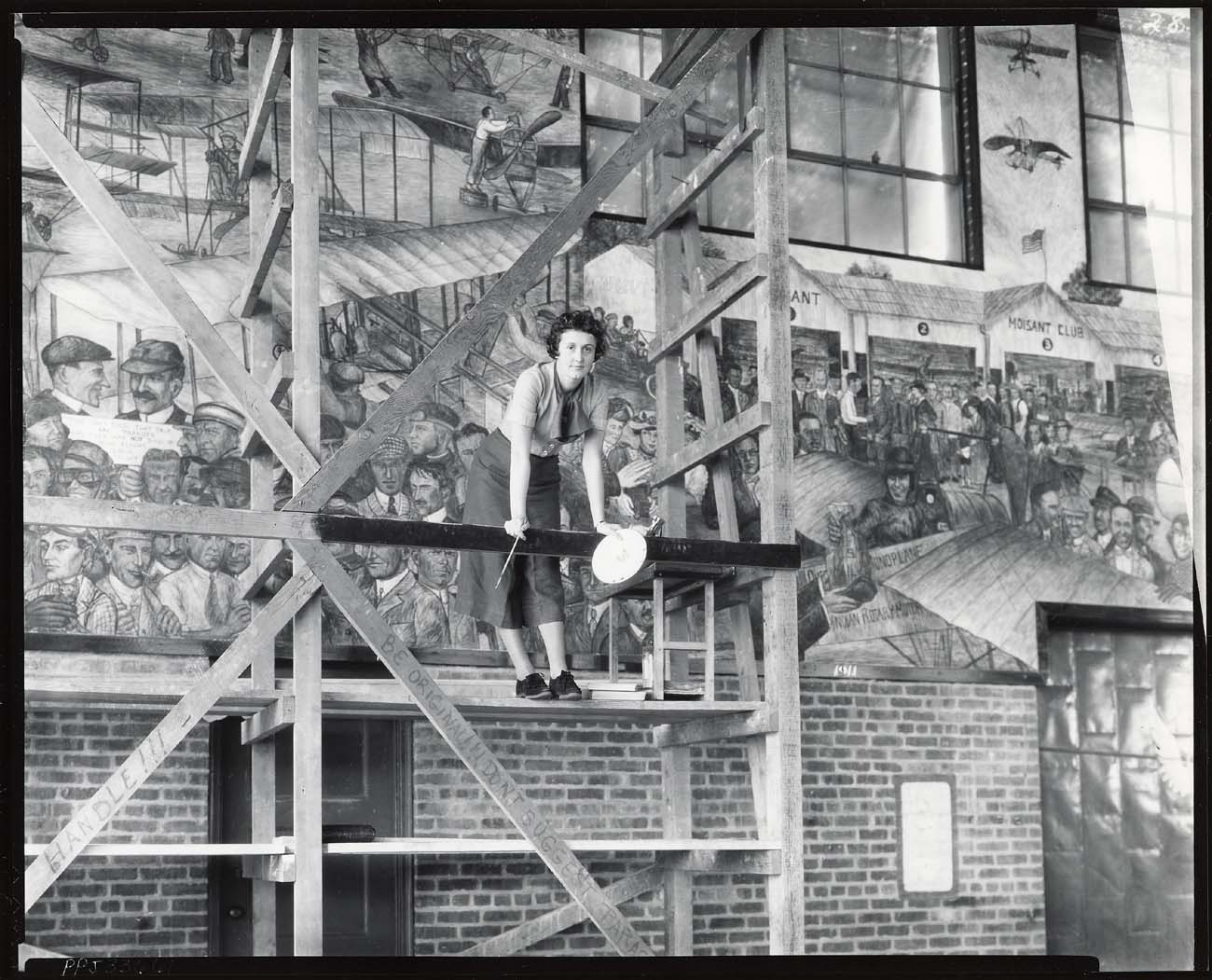
Aline Hofheimer (1909–1963) painting a 126-foot fresco representing aviation history in Roosevelt Field, Long Island (c. 1935)

== Mall ==
Manhattan-based real estate company Webb and Knapp gained a controlling interest in the airfield in 1950 and later built light factories on the former Unit 2. Currently its site is occupied by Roosevelt Field Mall and Garden City Plaza.

== In popular culture ==
- Arthur J. Burks, "Haunted Hangars" (two-part serial), Flyers, January & February 1930. Referred to as "Mineola field".
- In James Thurber's short story "The Greatest Man in the World", Jack "Pal" Smurch, a two bit hooligan turned national hero, both departs from and returns to Roosevelt Field on his historic round-the-world flight.

== See also ==
- Columbia Field, a nearby, defunct, historical airfield, also named Curtiss Field.
- List of Training Section Air Service airfields
- Mitchel Air Force Base
- Republic Field, nearest active airfield
