= L'Oiseau Blanc =

French biplane that disappeared in 1927

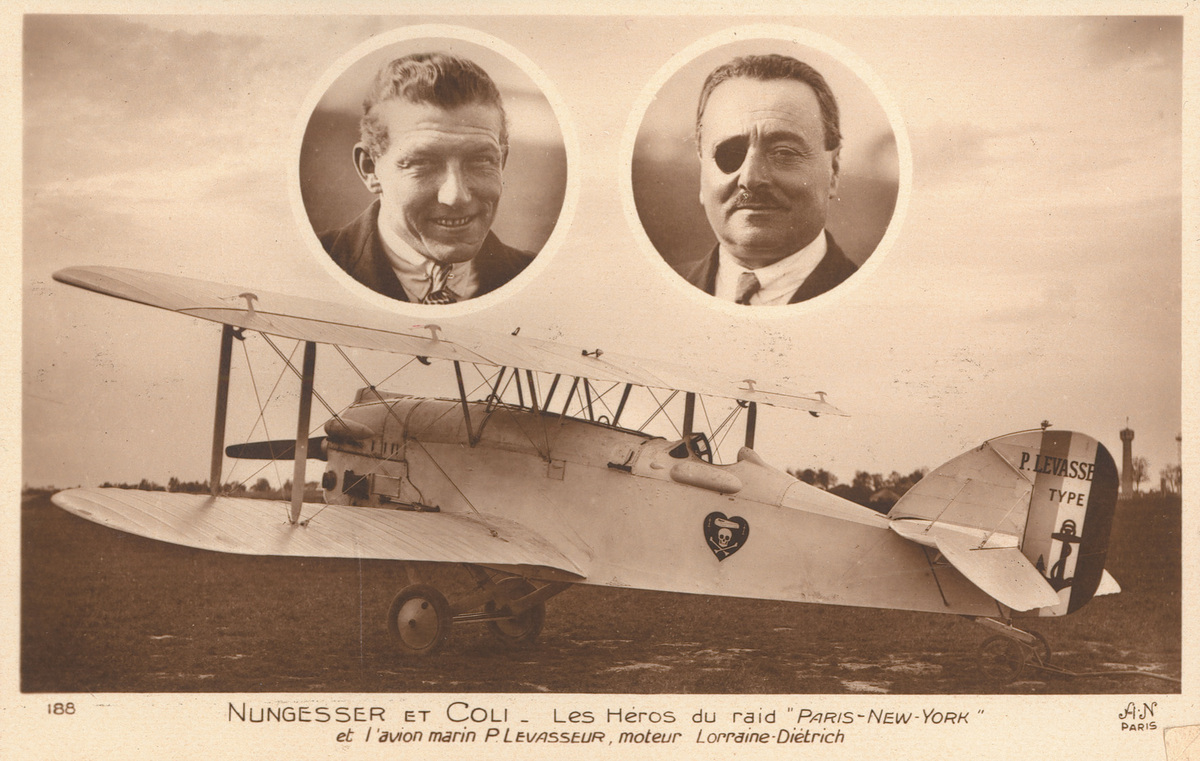
- 1927 postcard showing L'Oiseau Blanc, with pictures of Nungesser (left) and Coli (right)

General information
- Type: Levasseur PL.8
- Construction number: PL.8-01

History
- First flight: April 1927
- Fate: Disappeared during transatlantic flight attempt

L'Oiseau Blanc ([lwazo blɑ̃]; English: The White Bird) was a French Levasseur PL.8 biplane that disappeared in 1927 during an attempt to make the first non-stop transatlantic flight between Paris and New York City to compete for the Orteig Prize. French World War I aviation heroes Charles Nungesser (third highest French ace with 43 air combat victories during World War I) and François Coli took off from Paris on 8 May 1927 and were last seen over Ireland. Less than two weeks later, Charles Lindbergh flew New York–Paris in the Spirit of St. Louis and claimed the prize.

The disappearance of L'Oiseau Blanc is considered one of the great mysteries in the history of aviation. Many rumors circulated about the fate of the aircraft and crew, with mainstream opinion at the time being that it was probably lost in a squall over the Atlantic. Investigations starting in the 1980s suggest that it probably reached Newfoundland and may have crashed in Maine.

The disappearance of Nungesser and Coli has an extensive legacy and is referred to in many films and museums. A street in Paris is named after them and a commemorative postage stamp was issued in 1967. A statue at the Paris Le Bourget Airport honors the flight and there is a memorial on the cliffs of Étretat, where their aircraft was last seen in France.

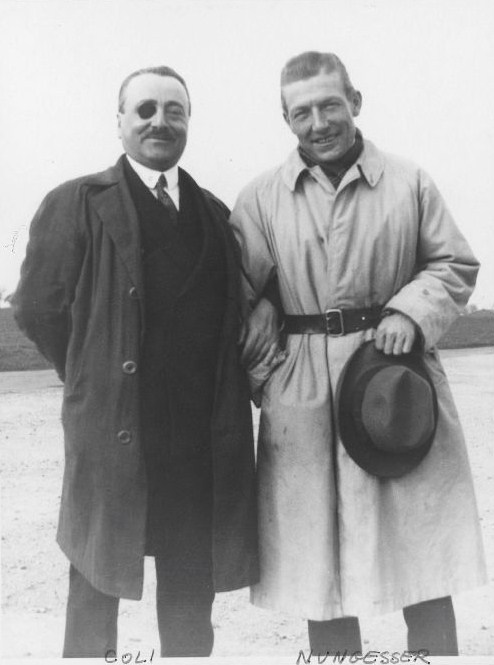
L–R: François Coli and Charles Nungesser posed for publicity photographs prior to the flight.

Planned flight map of L'Oiseau Blanc in 1927 from Paris to New York

== Background ==
In 1919, New York hotel owner Raymond Orteig offered the $25,000 Orteig Prize (approximately equivalent to $464,000 in 2025) to the first aviators to make a non-stop transatlantic flight between New York and Paris in the next five years. No one won the prize, so he renewed the offer in 1924. At that point, aviation technology was more advanced and many people were working toward winning it. Most were attempting to fly from New York to Paris, but a number of French aviators planned to fly from Paris to New York.

François Coli, age 45, was a World War I veteran and recipient of the French Legion of Honor, who had been making record-breaking flights around the Mediterranean Sea. He also had been planning a transatlantic flight since 1923. His original plans were to fly with his wartime comrade Paul Tarascon, a flying ace with 12 victories from the war. They became interested in the Orteig Prize in 1925, but in late 1926, an accident destroyed their Potez 25 biplane. Tarascon was badly burned and relinquished his place as pilot to 35-year-old Charles Nungesser, a highly experienced flying ace with over 40 victories, third highest among the French. He had been planning a solo crossing to win the Orteig Prize, but designer Pierre Levasseur insisted that he consider Coli as his navigator in a new two-place variant of the Levasseur PL.4.

== Design and development ==
At the Pierre Levasseur Company in Paris, Nungesser and Coli, working closely with Chief Engineer Émile Farret and production manager Albert Longelot, assisted in the design of the new Levasseur PL.8 biplane. Based on the Levasseur PL.4 developed for the Aéronavale to operate from the French aircraft carrier Béarn, the PL.8 was a conventional, single-bay, wood and fabric-covered biplane that carried a crew of two in a side-by-side, open cockpit.

Major modifications included the reinforcement of the plywood fuselage, and removing two of the forward cockpits so the main cockpit could be widened to allow Nungesser and Coli to sit side by side. The wingspan was also increased to approximately 15 m (49 ft). Two additional fuel tanks were mounted aft of the firewall, meaning the PL.8's three fuel tanks held a total of 4,025 L (1,063 US gal) of gasoline.

The PL.8 also incorporated several safety features in case of ditching at sea. Apart from small floats attached directly to the undersides of the lower wing, the main units of the fixed, tailskid undercarriage could be jettisoned on takeoff, in order to reduce the aircraft's weight. The underside of the fuselage was given a boat-like shape and made watertight for a water landing. Nungesser and Coli's plan was to make a water landing in New York, in front of the Statue of Liberty.

A single W-12 Lorraine-Dietrich 340 kilowatts (460 hp) engine was used, with the cylinders set in three banks angled 60° apart from one another, similar to the arrangement used in Napier engines. The engine was tested to ensure it would last the entire flight, and was run for over 40 hours while still in the Parisian factory.

The aircraft, christened L'Oiseau Blanc, was painted white, (Note: Nungesser had the aircraft painted white to aid in recognition if forced down at sea.) and had the French tricolor markings, with Nungesser's personal World War I flying ace logo: a skull and crossbones, candles and a coffin, on a black heart, painted on the fuselage. The biplane carried no radio (Note: Period radios were considered too unreliable to be worth the extra weight.) and relied only on celestial navigation, a specialty of Coli from his previous flights around the Mediterranean.

In 1928, a second PL-8, and equipped with a Hispano-Suiza 12M, 375 kW (500 hp) engine, was built.

The map shows the flight of L'Oiseau Blanc over the northwest of France, England and Ireland in 1927.

== Operational history ==
In April 1927, the PL.8-01 was shipped from the factory for Nungesser to begin a series of proving tests to determine aircraft performance. Most of the flights were conducted around Villacoublay and Chartres. Although full fuel loads were never carried, during one flight, it reached a speed of 207 kilometres per hour (129 mph) and flight elevation of 4,900 m (16,100 ft).

The evaluations proceeded successfully through the flight envelope without major changes required to the basic design. The only incident of note was a fire that broke out in the hangar where the PL.8-01 had been stored. Scorched fabric on the top wing was the result with effective repairs carried out shortly after. On 7 May 1927, after the tests were complete, the aircraft was prepared for its record flight, flying from Villacoublay to Le Bourget Field.

=== Transatlantic attempt ===
Nungesser and Coli took off at 5:17 a.m., 8 May 1927 from Le Bourget Field in Paris, heading for New York. Their PL.8-01 weighed 5,000 kg (11,000 lb) on takeoff, extremely heavy for a single-engined aircraft, barely clearing a line of trees at the end of the field. Gathering an escort of French fighter aircraft, Nungesser and Coli turned back as planned, and at low altitude, immediately jettisoned the main undercarriage.

The intended flight path was a great circle route, which would have taken them across the English Channel, over the southwestern part of England and Ireland, across the Atlantic to Newfoundland, then south over Nova Scotia, to Boston, and finally to a water landing in New York.

Once in the air, the biplane was escorted to the French coast by four military aircraft led by French Air Force Captain Venson, and sighted from the coastal town of Étretat. A sighting was made by the commanding officer of the British submarine HMS H50, who recorded the note in his log, that he observed a biplane at 300 m altitude, 20 nautical miles southwest of the tip of Needles on the Isle of Wight. In Ireland, an aircraft overhead was reported by a resident of the town of Dungarvan and a Catholic priest reported a sighting over the village of Carrigaholt, then no further verified reports were made.

Crowds of people gathered in New York to witness the historic arrival, with tens of thousands of people crowding Battery Park in Manhattan to have a good view of the Statue of Liberty, where the aircraft was scheduled to touch down. Rumors circulated that L'Oiseau Blanc had been sighted along its route, in Newfoundland, or over Long Island. In France, some newspapers even reported that Nungesser and Coli had arrived safely in New York, evoking a wave of French patriotism. L'Oiseau Blanc had been carrying a sizable load of fuel, 4,000 litres (1,100 US gal), which would have given them approximately 42 hours of flight time. After this time had passed, with no word as to the aircraft's fate, it was realized that the aircraft had been lost. In France, the public was scandalized by the newspapers such as La Presse, which had printed false reports about the aircraft's arrival, and outrage was generated against the companies involved, with demonstrations in the streets.

In the immediate aftermath of their disappearance, an international search was launched to find Nungesser and Coli. Aviation Digest sponsored a well-known pilot, Floyd Bennett, to search the area between New York and Newfoundland for nine days. The Canadian government search and rescue organizations also sent out two search aircraft, of which one crashed. Searchers including the French Navy, the United States Navy, and the Royal Canadian Navy scoured the route, including Labrador, the northeast coast of the U.S. and the area around the St. Lawrence River. With no sign of the aircraft, further search efforts were abandoned.

Twelve days after Nungesser and Coli's departure, Charles Lindbergh, flying solo in the Spirit of Saint Louis, took off from New York on his own famous journey. After a flight of 33 hours, 30 minutes, he received a hero's welcome when he arrived in Paris, even as the French mourned the loss of Nungesser and Coli.

== Mystery ==
The mainstream view was that L'Oiseau Blanc crashed over the Atlantic due to a squall. Nonetheless, 12 witnesses in Newfoundland and Maine claimed to have heard the aircraft as it passed overhead. Residents at Harbour Grace, Newfoundland, reported sighting a white aircraft circling in haze or fog late on 9 May 1927. There were no aircraft on the island and no overflights taking place, and the local newspapers highlighted a "mystery" aircraft. If these sightings were of L'Oiseau Blanc, it would indicate that the flight was far behind schedule, as they would have been in the 40th hour of flight. This delay could be explained, however, by the fact that the aircraft was flying against the prevailing weather pattern. Fishermen off the coast of Newfoundland reported that the weather had turned cold and foul, which might have caused the delay. In May 1927, the United States Coast Guard found an airplane wing in Napeague Bay at Fort Pond Bay, Long Island Sound; aircraft wreckage was seen in August 1927, 200 miles off the New York Coast.

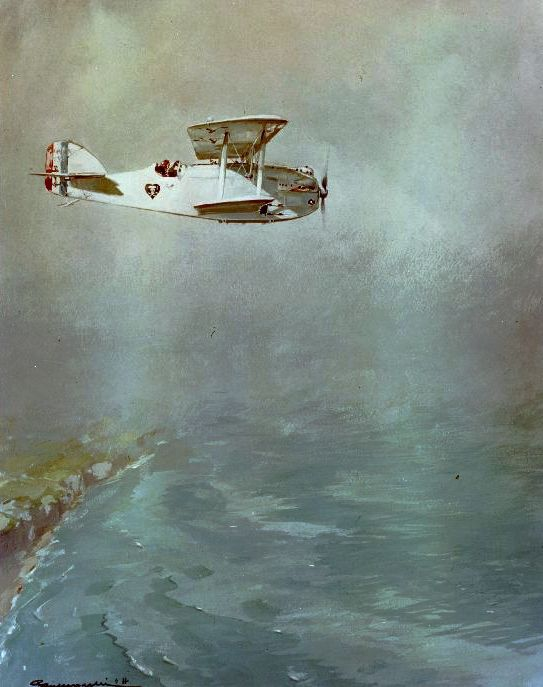
L'Oiseau Blanc depicted in a contemporary painting, after the undercarriage has been jettisoned.

There were many rumors concerning the aircraft's disappearance, including a theory that the aviators had been shot down by rum-runners aboard the rum boat Amistad as well as the belief that Nungesser and Coli were living with indigenous peoples in Canada. In 1930, claims circulated that L'Oiseau Blanc's engine had been located in Maine, but nothing was confirmed. Stories emerged in 1948 from reports that caribou hunters and fur trappers had found aircraft wreckage in Great Gull Pond in Newfoundland.

Gunnar Hansen's article "The Unfinished Flight of the White Bird" in the June 1980 issue of Yankee renewed popular interest in L'Oiseau Blanc. He described Anson Berry (d. 1936), a hermit living near Machias, Maine, who heard a sputtering aircraft fly over his isolated camp at Round Lake late in the afternoon of 9 May 1927. Berry had not been able to see the aircraft because of fog and low clouds, but he heard a crash or forced landing in the distance. He tried to locate the crash site, but was unsuccessful. Hansen and others researched the mystery during the 1980s and located multiple witnesses who reported memories of the aircraft in a line from Nova Scotia down to eastern Maine.

In 1984, the French government made an official investigation, concluding that it was possible that the aircraft had reached Newfoundland. In 1989, the NBC television series Unsolved Mysteries advanced the theory that the two aviators made it across the ocean but crashed and perished in the woods of Maine. Nungesser's relative William Nungesser made several trips to Maine to search, focusing his energies around the north slope of Round Lake Hills in Washington County as well as the area around Lake Winnipesaukee.

Clive Cussler and his National Underwater and Marine Agency (NUMA) organization also attempted to solve the mystery, searching for the aircraft in Maine and in Newfoundland. They made multiple visits in the 1980s and interviewed hunters, fishermen, and others who said that they had seen or heard the aircraft pass by in 1927.

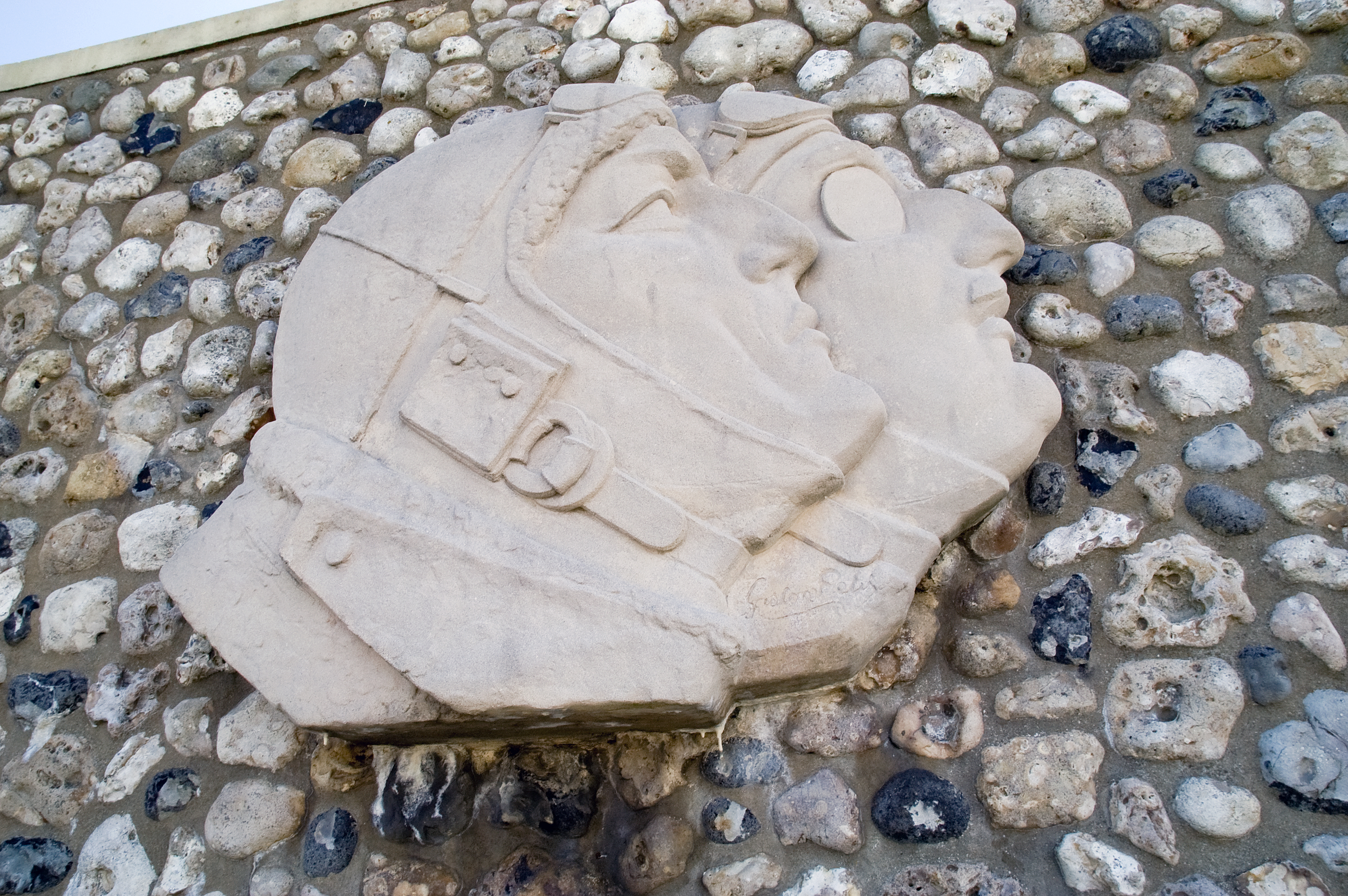
Carving on the wall of the museum in Étretat, France, honoring Nungesser and Coli

The NUMA expedition was named "Midnight Ghost" after Lindbergh's comment in The Spirit of St. Louis that Nungesser and Coli had "vanished like midnight ghosts". In 1992, divers traveled to Newfoundland and searched Great Gull Pond for a wreck, but they found nothing and were not even sure that they had located the right lake. Other lakes were also searched, from Machias to Chesterfield.

Certain pieces were found which did suggest that L'Oiseau Blanc had made it to the continent. Little of the aircraft would have remained, since it was created primarily from plywood and canvas. The parts most likely to endure would have been the engine and the aluminum fuel tanks. In Maine, bits and pieces of struts were found, and wood similar to the kind used to build the biplane. Engine metal was also found near the town of Machias that was not typical to the United States or Canada. Two residents described a large metal object, a "really big motor", which had been dragged out of the woods for salvage along a logging path. In 2011, The Wall Street Journal reported that an unofficial French team was focusing on theories that the aircraft crashed off the coast of Canada after flying over Newfoundland.

== Legacy ==
The disappearance of L'Oiseau Blanc has been called "the Everest of aviation mysteries". TIGHAR, The International Group for Historic Aircraft Recovery, has called the aircraft, "History's Most Important Missing Airplane". It has been claimed that if the aircraft had successfully completed its journey, Lindbergh would not qualify for the Orteig Prize. When Lindbergh did succeed with his own flight across the Atlantic, the international attention on his achievement was possibly enhanced because of the disappearance of L'Oiseau Blanc just days earlier. It is also suggested that it was Lindbergh's historic success which gave a major boost to the American aviation industry, without which the course of America's military and industrial accomplishments might have been quite different.

A monument was erected in Étretat in 1927, to mark the last place from which the biplane was seen in France, but it was destroyed in 1942 by the occupying German army. A new 24 m (79 ft) high monument, the "Monument Nungesser et Coli", was erected in 1963 atop one of the cliffs. There is also a nearby museum.

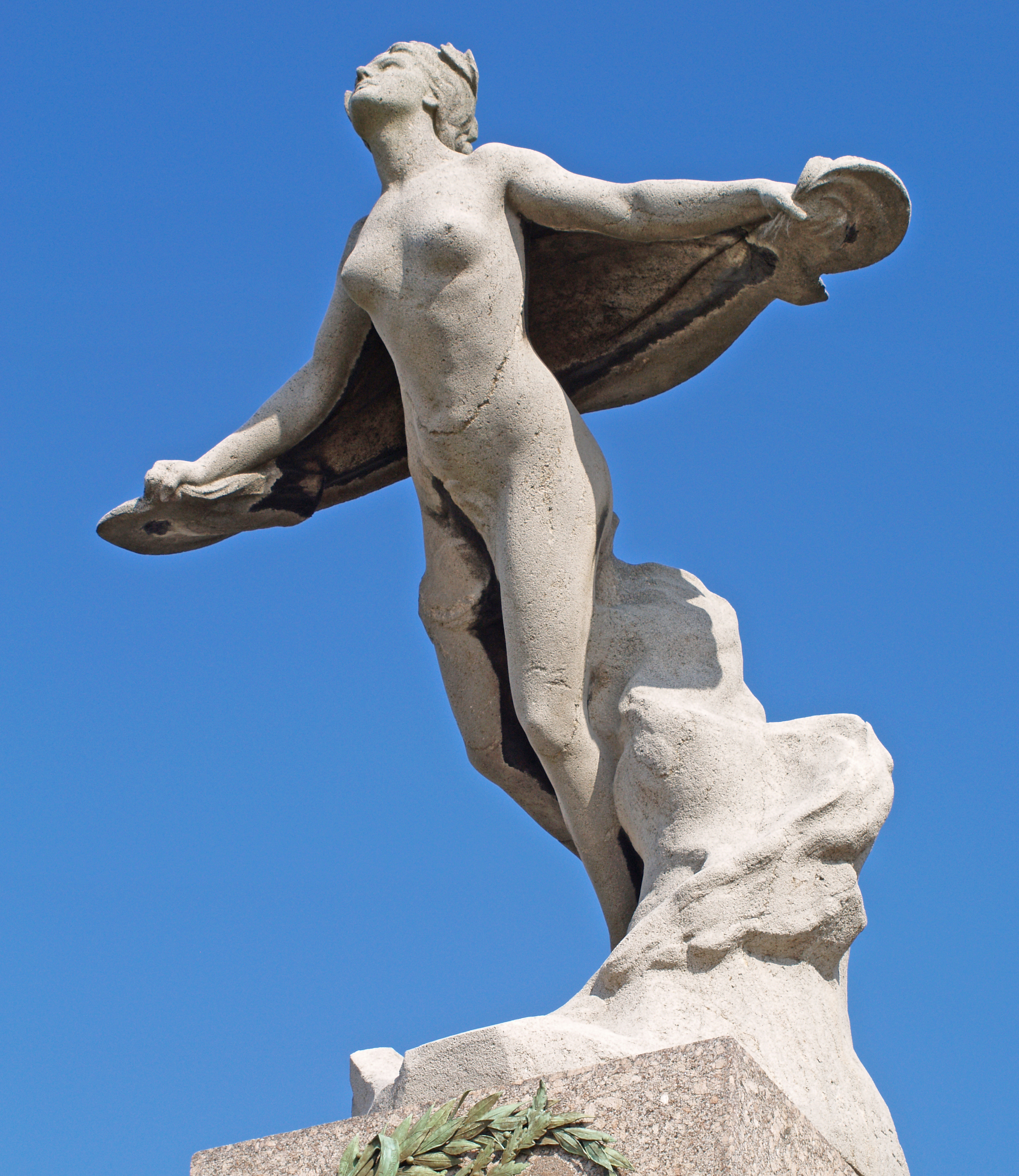
Statue honoring Nungesser, Coli and Lindbergh, at Le Bourget Airport in Paris

Another monument in France was inaugurated on 8 May 1928, at Le Bourget airport. Honoring Lindbergh, Nungesser and Coli, it is inscribed: "A ceux qui tentèrent et celui qui accomplit" (trans.: "To those who tried and to the one who succeeded"). The French issued a commemorative postage stamp in 1967, 40 years after the flight, to honor Nungesser and Coli's attempt. A street, Rue Nungesser et Coli, is named after the aviators, along the Stade Jean Bouin in the 16th arrondissement of Paris.

In 1928, the Ontario Surveyor General named a number of lakes in the northwest of the province to honour aviators who had perished during 1927, mainly in attempting oceanic flights. Amongst these are Coli Lake (51.32°N 93.59°W) and Nungesser Lake (51.49°N 93.52°W).

The fate of L'Oiseau Blanc is occasionally mentioned in literature and films. A 1999 Canadian made-for-TV children's special movie, "Dead Aviators" (airing on U.S. cable TV as "Restless Spirits"), uses the mystery of Nungesser and Coli's disappearance as the key plot device. A young girl, who struggles with her pilot father's death in an aircraft crash years before, visits her grandmother in Newfoundland. While there, she encounters the ghosts of Nungesser and Coli, whose restless spirits constantly relive their own unheralded 1927 crash in a nearby pond. The girl decides to help the pair move on to the afterlife by assisting them in rebuilding their aircraft and completing their flight so they may be released and, by doing so, works through her own emotional distress over her father's test flight death. In the opening montage of the 2005 film Sahara, based on Cussler's novel, a French newspaper article is displayed reporting a fictional story of NUMA finding the aircraft. And in the 2018 novel Chance to Break by Owen Prell, the protagonist muses about the fate of the French aviators and compares them to valiant athletes who are defeated in the arena of sports.

As of 2008, the landing gear (or, more accurately, "takeoff gear", since there was no intention to land on it) is the only confirmed part of the biplane remaining, and is on display at the Musée de l'Air et de l'Espace (French Air and Space Museum), in Le Bourget airport in Paris, the location from which L'Oiseau Blanc took off.

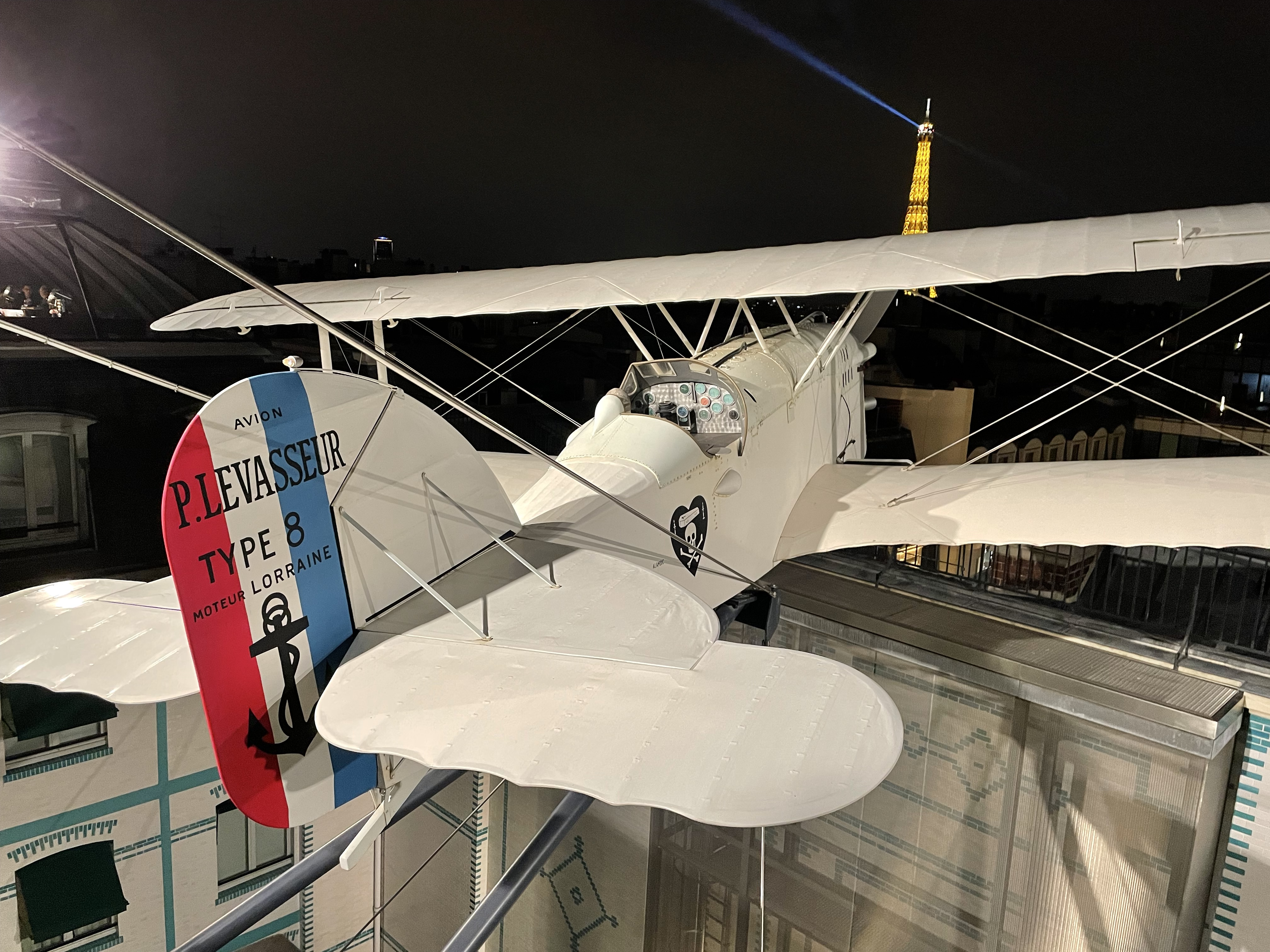
A copy of the L’Oiseau Blanc is on display at the homonymous restaurant in The Peninsula Hotel, Paris.

== Specifications ==
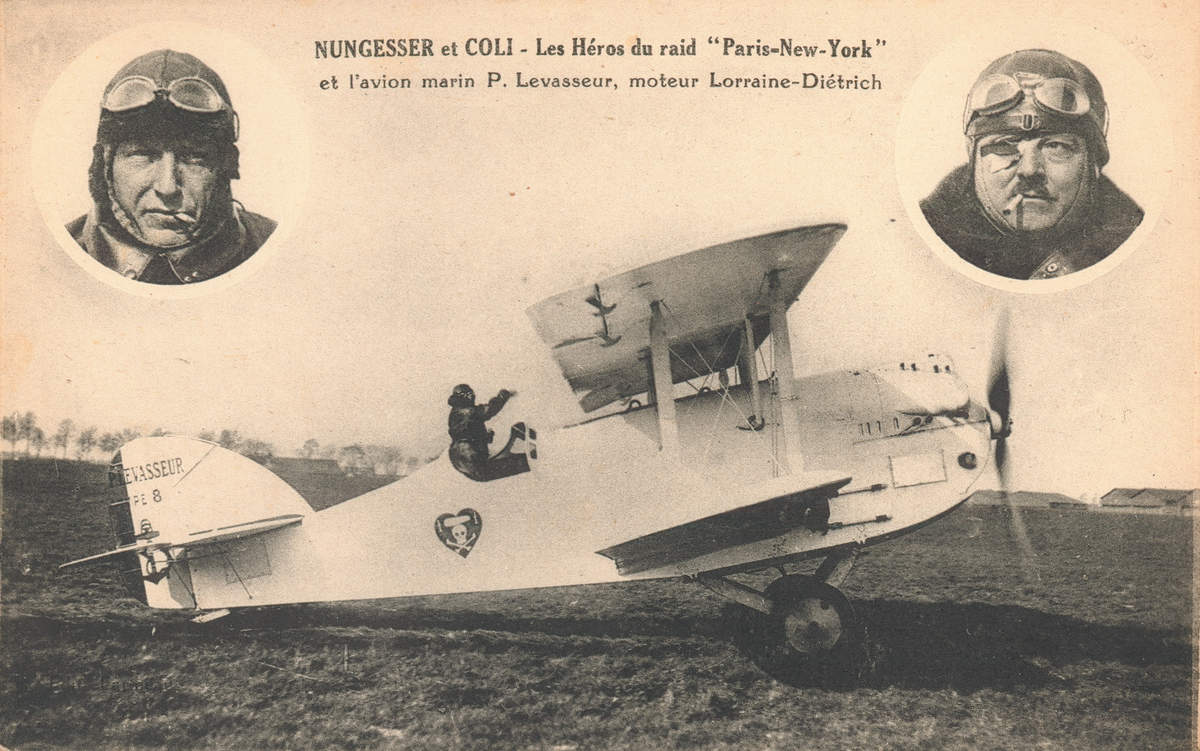
Postcard of L'Oiseau Blanc

General characteristics

- Crew: Two
- Length: 9.75 m (31 ft 11 in)
- Wingspan: 15 m (49 ft 0 in)
- Height: 3.89 m (12 ft 9 in)
- Wing area: 61.0 m^{2} (656 sq ft)
- Empty weight: 1,905 kg (4,200 lb)
- Gross weight: 5,000 kg (11,000 lb)
- Powerplant: 1 × Lorraine-Dietrich W-12ED , 340 kW (460 hp)

Performance

- Maximum speed: 193 km/h (120 mph, 100 kn)
- Cruise speed: 165 km/h (102 mph, 89 kn)
- Range: 7,000 km (4,350 mi, 3,780 nmi)
- Endurance: 40 hours
- Service ceiling: 7,000 m (22,965 ft)

== See also ==
- History of aviation
- List of missing aircraft
- Transatlantic flight
