= Keystone K-47 Pathfinder =

K-47 Pathfinder
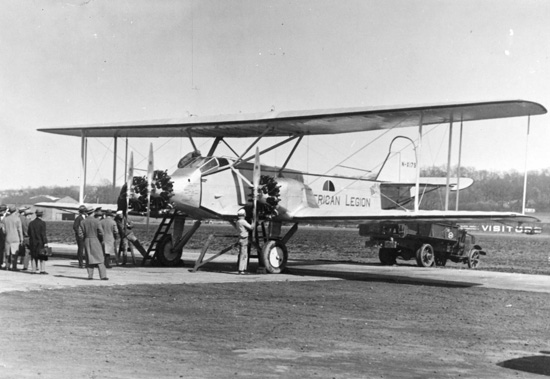
- K-47 "American Legion"

General information
- Type: Airliner
- National origin: United States
- Manufacturer: Keystone Aircraft
- Number built: 2

History
- First flight: 1927

The Keystone K-47 Pathfinder was an airliner developed in the United States in the late 1920s, built only in prototype form.

== Design and development ==
The Pathfinder was an attempt by the Keystone Aircraft Corporation to develop a civil transport version of the successful series of bombers that it was producing for the United States Army Air Corps as the LB-5 and its derivatives. Like them, it was a conventional biplane design with engines mounted in nacelles on the lower wing, but also added a third engine, mounted on the nose (as the single engine of the LB-1 had been). A passenger cabin with seating for ten was added to the fuselage.

The first Pathfinder (registered NX179) was chosen by US Navy pilots Noel Davis and Stanton Wooster for their attempt at the Orteig Prize to cross the Atlantic. The standard Liberty engines were replaced by Wright J-5s of approximately half their power. Painted yellow, the aircraft was named American Legion after the sponsors of the attempt. On 26 April 1927, a week before their planned departure, the aircraft crashed during a heavily laden test flight from Langley Field at Hampton, Virginia. Unable to climb quickly enough to clear a row of trees, Davis attempted to turn the aircraft, but lost height and was forced to land. Although he succeeded in bringing the aircraft down, he was unable to stop it as it skidded into a nearby bog and was wrecked. Davis and Wooster were both killed, the former's face crushed and the latter's neck broken. The remains of the aircraft were trucked back to Keystone, where it was rebuilt and re-registered (NC1612). It was purchased by Basil Rowe to use for his pioneering air service in the West Indies, West Indian Aerial Express, christened Santa Maria. As Pan American expanded its operations into the area, Santa Maria was chartered to fly the first of the airline's mail flights from Key West to Havana, before Pan Am purchased West Indian Aerial Express outright, and the Pathfinder along with it. The aircraft continued to fly freight for Pan Am for some years before being retired and burned at Brownsville, Texas.

The second Pathfinder (NC5317) was fitted with extensions to its lower wing that was used to carry a neon sign advertising Silver Dust laundry soap through the skies of New York City at night during 1928.

== Variants ==
K-47
initial version with Liberty L-12 engines, modified for trans-atlantic attempt (1 built)
K-47A

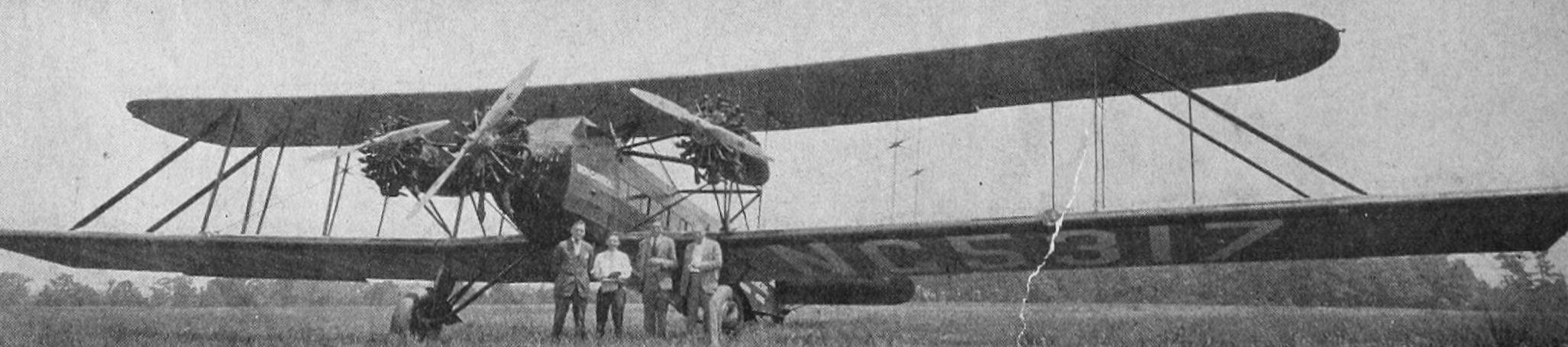
Keystone K-47C Sign Carrier photo from Aero Digest November 1928

K-47 rebuilt after crash for use as commercial transport, fuselage and lower wingspan extended. Later repowered with Wright Cyclones for increase in top speed to 150 mph (240 km/h)
K-47C
Advertising platform with further extended lower wingspan, 2 × Wright J-5 engines and 1 × Pratt & Whitney Wasp

== Specifications (K-47A) ==
Data from Jane's all the World's Aircraft 1928

General characteristics

- Crew: 2
- Capacity: 10 pax
- Length: 44 ft 4 in (13.51 m)
- Wingspan: 66 ft (20 m)
- Wing area: 1,150 sq ft (107 m^{2})
- Airfoil: USA 45
- Empty weight: 6,356 lb (2,883 kg)
- Gross weight: 10,841 lb (4,917 kg)
- Fuel capacity: 300 US gal (250 imp gal; 1,100 L) / 1,800 lb (820 kg)
- Powerplant: 3 × Wright J-5 Whirlwind 9-cyl. air-cooled radial piston engines, 220 hp (160 kW) each
- Propellers: 2-bladed fixed pitch metal propellers

Performance

- Maximum speed: 115 mph (185 km/h, 100 kn)
- Stall speed: 55 mph (89 km/h, 48 kn)
- Range: 500 mi (800 km, 430 nmi)
- Rate of climb: 570 ft/min (2.9 m/s)
- Wing loading: 9.4 lb/sq ft (46 kg/m^{2})
- Power/mass: 0.061 hp/lb (0.100 kW/kg)
