= François Coli =

French aviator (1881–1927)

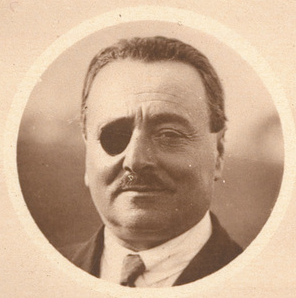
- François Coli
- Born: 5 June 1881; Marseille, France
- Disappeared: 8 May 1927 (aged 45); Atlantic Ocean
- Known for: Flights across Mediterranean, and attempt at Transatlantic flight

François Coli (5 June 1881 – presumably on or after 8 May 1927) was a French pilot and navigator best known as the flying partner of Charles Nungesser in their fatal attempt to achieve the first transatlantic flight.

== Early life and World War I ==
Born in Marseille of a Corsican seafaring family, Coli became a merchant captain, married, and had three daughters. Upon the outbreak of World War I he offered his services to the French Navy. Reportedly disillusioned because no warships needed a captain, he entered the army as a private. His age and experience gained him a commission in 1915 and that summer he was promoted to captain. Suffering multiple wounds, he was declared unfit for infantry service and transferred to the French Air Service, gaining his pilot's brevet in March 1916. Late that year he joined Escadrille N.62 and rose to command the squadron in February 1917.

Captain Coli remained as chief of the Escadrille des Coqs even after losing an eye in a crash in March 1918. He departed the Roosters that August with a reputation as an exceptional navigator and leader.

== Post-war career ==
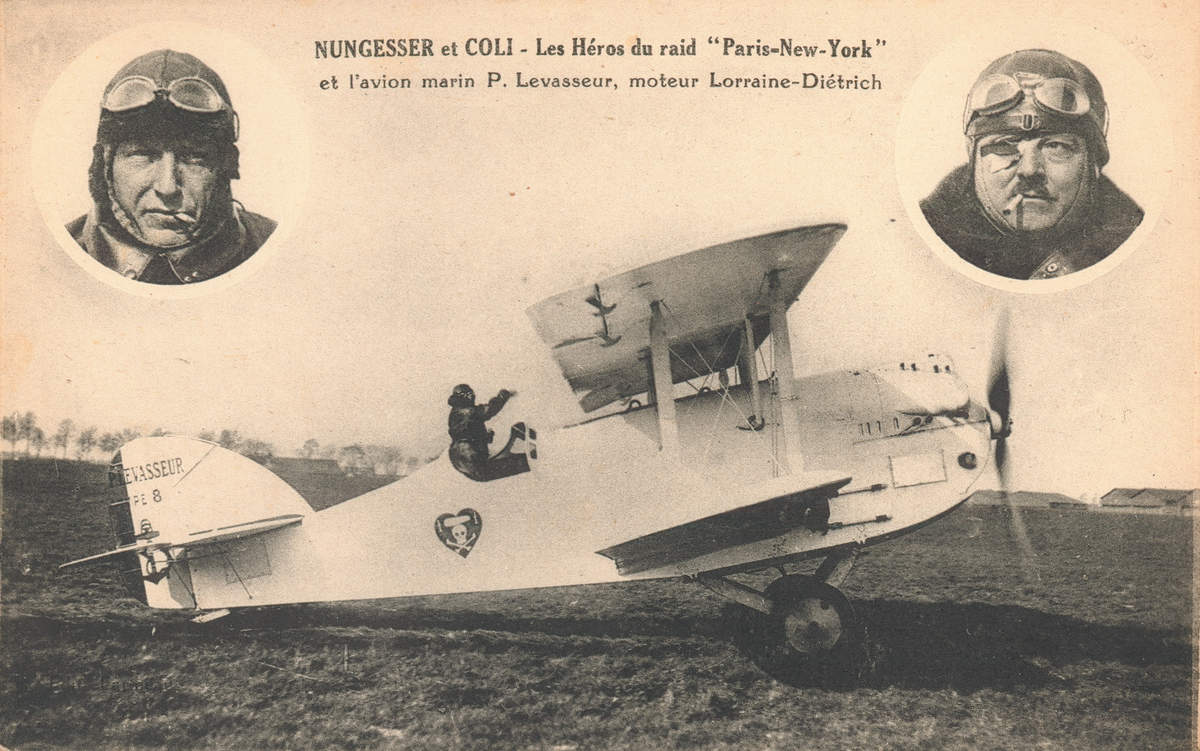
L'Oiseau Blanc

After the war Coli began a series of record-setting distance flights. On 26 January 1919 he achieved the first double crossing of the Mediterranean with Lieutenant Henri Roget. The flight established the over-water distance record of 735 kilometers (457 statute miles) in five hours.

On 24 May, again with Roget, Coli set a long-distance record from Paris to Port Lyautey, Morocco, a distance of 2,200 kilometers (1,400 mi). He was injured in the crash at the end of the flight.

The following year, 1920, with Joseph Sadi-Lecointe, Coli made further long-distance flights around the Mediterranean.

In 1923 Coli began planning a nonstop transatlantic flight with wartime comrade Paul Tarascon, a leading flying ace. In 1925 they became interested in the Orteig Prize of $25,000 for the first flight between Paris and New York. Late in 1926 an accident destroyed their Potez 25 biplane and Tarascon was badly burned. A new aircraft was sought, and Tarascon relinquished his place as pilot to Charles Nungesser. They took off from Paris on 8 May 1927 in the biplane L'Oiseau Blanc, but disappeared en route.

In 1928, the Ontario Surveyor General named a number of lakes in the northwest of the province to honour aviators who had perished during 1927, mainly in attempting oceanic flights. Amongst these are Coli Lake (51.32°N 93.59°W) and Nungesser Lake (51.48°N 93.52°W).

== See also ==
- Hanriot HD.1
- List of people who disappeared mysteriously at sea
