= René Fonck =

French World War I flying ace

René Paul Fonck
- René Fonck wearing the Légion d'honneur
- Born: 27 March 1894; Saulcy-sur-Meurthe, Vosges, France
- Died: 18 June 1953 (aged 59); Paris, France
- Military career
- Allegiance: France
- Branch: Infantry, French Air Service
- Service years: 1914–1918; 1937–1940
- Rank: Colonel
- Units: C47, Spa103
- Conflicts: First World War; Second World War
- Awards: Grand Officier of the Légion d'honneur Médaille militaire Croix de guerre Military Cross (United Kingdom); Distinguished Conduct Medal (United Kingdom); Croix de guerre (Belgium)

Colonel René Paul Fonck (27 March 1894 – 18 June 1953) was a French aviator who ended the First World War as the top Entente fighter ace and, when all succeeding aerial conflicts of the 20th and 21st centuries are also considered, Fonck still holds the title of "all-time Allied Ace of Aces". He received confirmation for 75 victories (72 solo and three shared) out of 142 claims. Taking into account his probable claims, Fonck's final tally could conceivably be nearer 100 or above. He was made an Officer of the Legion of Honor in 1918 and later a Commander of the Legion of Honor after the war, and raised again to the dignity of Grand Officer.

== Early life ==
Fonck was born on 27 March 1894 in the village of Saulcy-sur-Meurthe in the Vosges region of north eastern France. Fonck left school when he was 13. Although he had been interested in aviation from his youth, he was rejected for the air service when conscripted on 22 August 1914. Instead, he underwent five months basic training for the role of combat engineer; his training duties included first digging trenches near Épinal, and later bridge repairs on the Moselle River.

== Military aviation career ==
=== 1915–1916 ===
On 15 February 1915 he was finally accepted into basic training to learn how to fly. He trained at St. Cyr and then at Le Crotoy on a Blériot Penguin, a reduced-wingspan "flightless" version of the famous Blériot XI aircraft that gave the sensation of flying while still on the ground. He completed his pilot training in May 1915 and then flew Caudron G III observation aircraft with Escadrille C 47.

On 25 May 1916 Fonck's observer was killed by an anti-aircraft shell burst, a fate that almost befell Fonck a few weeks later. Fonck claimed his first enemy aircraft in July 1916, but his victory was unconfirmed.

On 6 August, he attacked a German Rumpler C.III, and by maneuvering over and around the reconnaissance plane, staying out of its fields of fire, forced it lower and lower until the German crew landed behind French lines. It was his first verified victory, though shared with his observer, Lieutenant Thiberge. It brought him the Médaille militaire in late August 1916.

=== 1917 ===
On 17 March 1917, Fonck scored a second time, downing an Albatros in conjunction with his observer, Sergeant Huffer. By this time, Fonck had amassed over 500 hours flight time, an incredible amount in those early days of aviation.

Aged 23, on 15 April 1917 ("Bloody April"), Fonck received a coveted invitation to join the famous Escadrille les Cigognes. Groupe de Combat 12, with its four escadrilles (or squadrons), was the world's first fighter wing. The then leading French ace, Georges Guynemer, was serving at the time in one of its escadrilles, N3, and had just scored his 36th victory.

Fonck was assigned to another escadrille in the group, Spa 103. Flying the SPAD VII, he quickly made a name for himself, attaining flying ace status by 13 May. He picked off another target on 12 June, then went on hiatus until 9 August. He scored twice more that month, on 21 and 22 August.

On 14 September, he killed the pilot of a German observation plane and watched as the plane inverted and dropped the thrashing observer almost through the wing of Fonck's Spad. He even went to the extreme of tearing the barograph out of the cockpit of that day's victim, his twelfth, so its readout would confirm his combat report. On 30 September, he and Adjutant Dupre jointly shot down a German two-seater Rumpler C.IV 6787/16 of FA 18. The news reported the killed pilot to be Leutnant Kurt Wissemann, who had allegedly shot down Guynemer, and that Fonck had boasted of avenging the death of his "good friend". This story is put into question by German records, indicating that Wissemann of Jasta 3 had been killed two days before in a different fight, in which he was flying a single-seater, probably against No. 56 Squadron.

September and October added four victories apiece to Fonck's score. Thus, by year's end, he had raised his tally to nineteen, was commissioned an officer, and had received the Légion d'honneur.

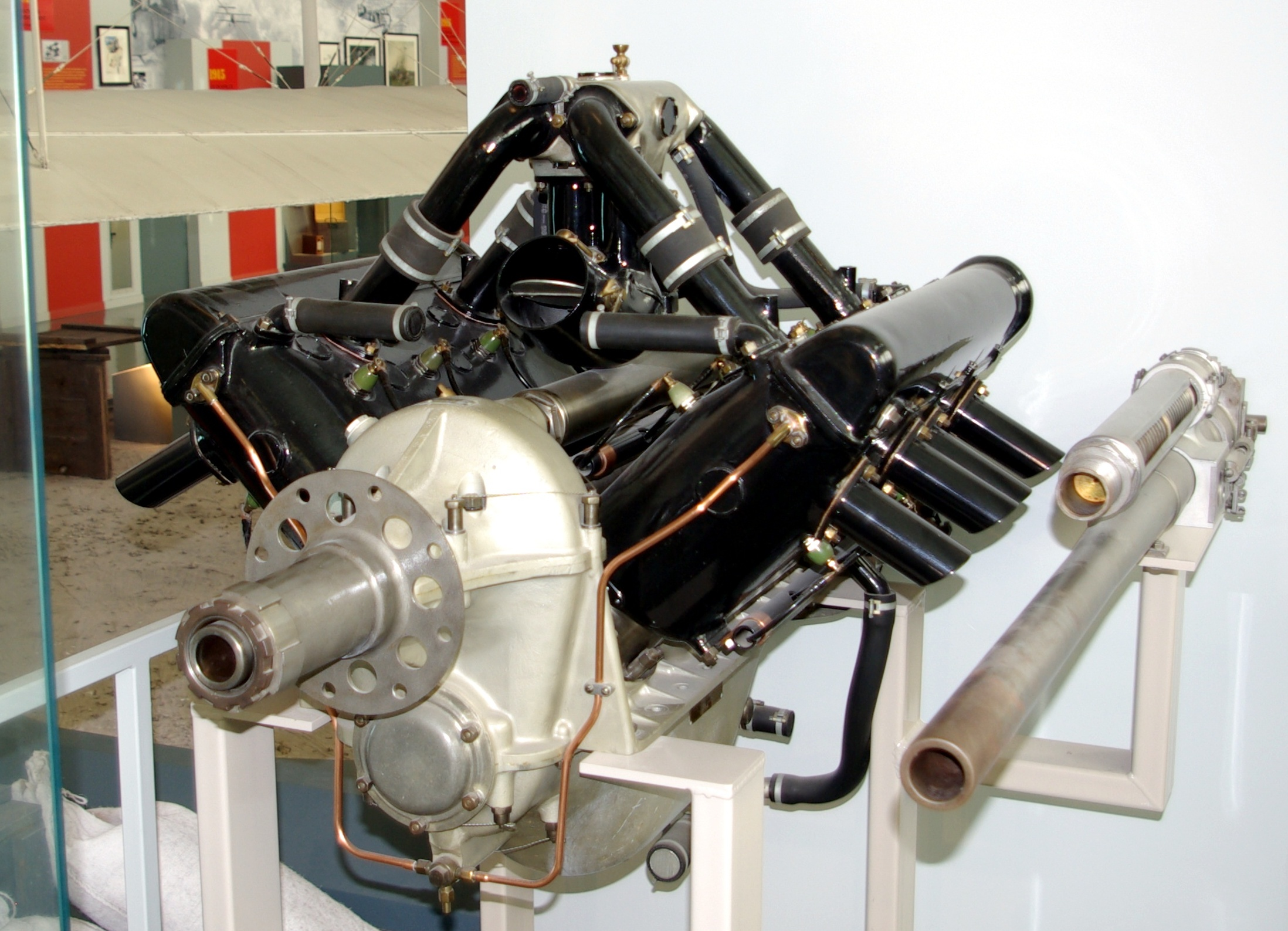
A geared-output shaft HS.8C engine for a SPAD S.XII, showing the elevated intake manifold to clear the 37mm cannon mounted in the "vee" between the cylinder banks.

Fonck got only better. Known for his clinical professionalism, he applied mathematical principles to combat flying, and his engineering knowledge regarding the capabilities of the aircraft he flew was unsurpassed by his fellow pilots. Fonck took few chances, patiently stalking his intended victims from higher altitudes. He then used deflection shooting with deadly accuracy at close range, resulting in an astonishing economy of ammunition expended per kill. More often than not, a single burst of less than five rounds from his Vickers machine gun was sufficient. His preferred method of aerial combat was not to engage into dogfights, but to carry out surgically merciless executions. He was also reputed to be able to spot enemy observation aircraft from very far away, where most other pilots would have perceived nothing.

Fonck, like France's leading ace, Captain Guynemer, flew a limited-production SPAD XII fighter, distinguished by the presence of a hand-loaded 37mm Puteaux cannon firing through the propeller boss. He is apparently credited with downing 11 German airplanes with this type of armament, called a moteur-canon. This was made possible by the gear-reduction version of the Hispano-Suiza V8 SOHC engine first used in that model of SPAD fighter. It offset the now-hollow propeller shaft above the crankshaft axis, and the 37mm cannon was mounted in the V space between the two rows of cylinders. Fonck would later fly the highly successful SPAD XIII, the first SPAD fighter model to use twin Vickers machine guns.

=== 1918 ===
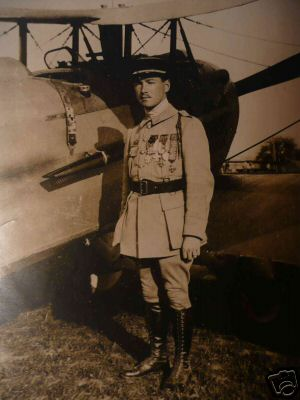
Fonck beside his Spad XIII

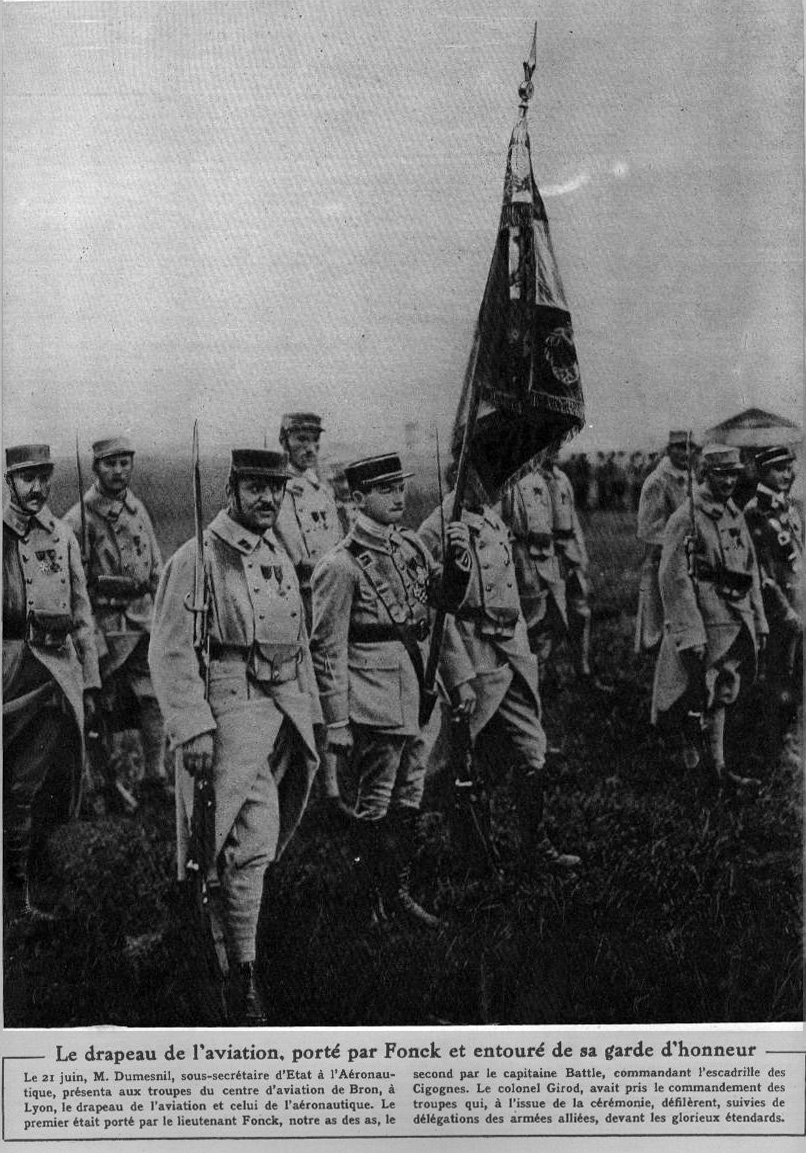
A July 1918 Le Miroir magazine article (no. 241, p. 7) showing Fonck carrying a standard

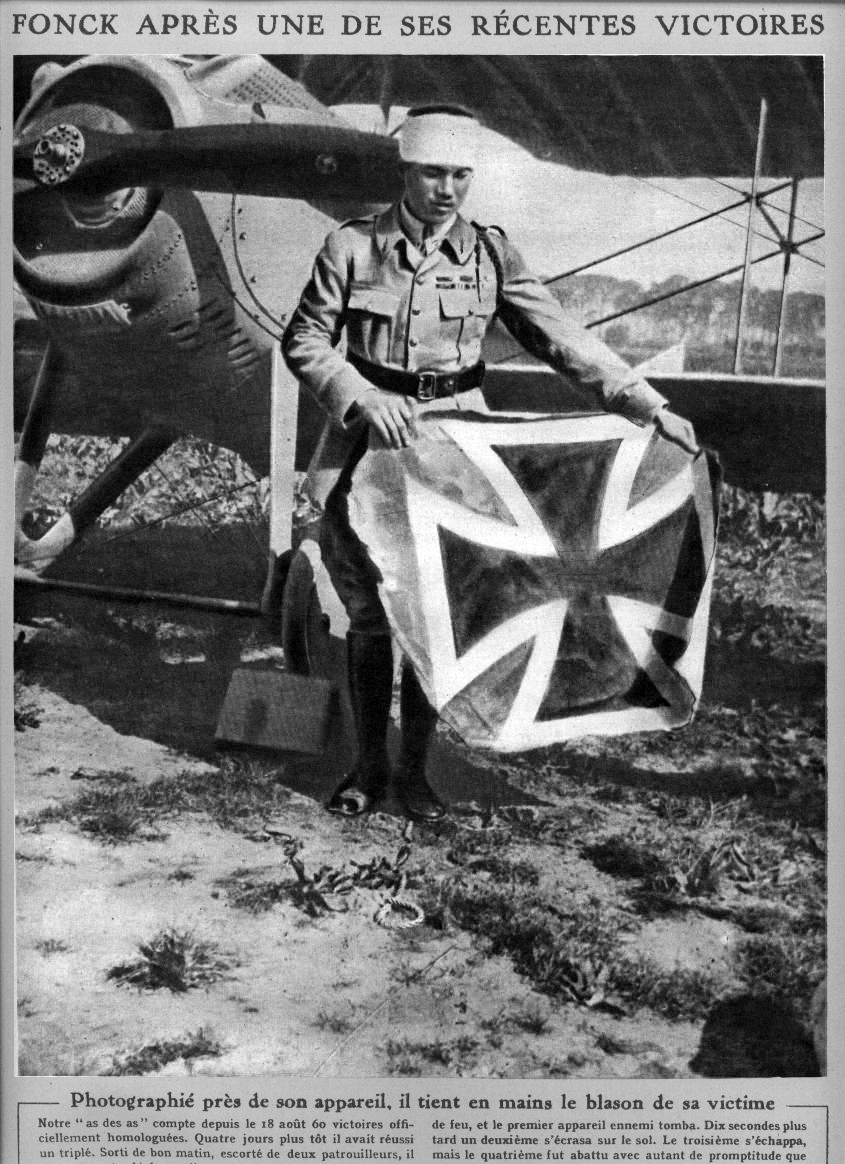
A September 1918 magazine Le Miroir article (no. 251, p. 15) showing Fonck with a German Cross emblem from what is allegedly his 60th victory.

He did not add to his tally sheet until 19 January 1918, when he scored a double victory. February added another five, March seven more, and another three in April.

Then came a spectacular performance on 9 May. It was sparked by a disagreement between Fonck and two of his squadronmates, Edwin C. Parsons and Frank Baylies. Perturbed by Fonck's lectures on aerial success, the two Americans bet Fonck a bottle of champagne that one of them would shoot down an enemy plane before Fonck. Baylies took off despite hazy weather and shot down a Halberstadt CL.II. Back at the airfield, rather than pay off the bet, a sulky Fonck badgered the Americans to change the terms of the bet so that whoever shot down the most Germans that day would win. Lingering fog kept Fonck grounded most of the day. It was well into the afternoon before it cleared enough for him to take off at 1500 hours. Between 1600 and 1605 hours, he shot down three enemy two-seater reconnaissance planes. A couple of hours later, he repeated the feat. Understanding the importance of reconnaissance planes, with their potential to direct intensive artillery fire onto French troops, Fonck concentrated his attention upon them; six shot down within a three-hour span proved it.

He added a double victory on 19 May and five more in June. By now, he was shooting doubles frequently, and with 49 on his score sheet, he was rapidly closing in on Guynemer's record.

On 18 July 1918, he achieved another double, to bring his total to 53 and into a tie with Guynemer. The following day, he shot down three more enemy aircraft and surpassed the score of the legendary Guynemer, who had remained the leading French ace despite his death on 11 September 1917.

He added four more victories in August, raising his total to 60. Then, on 26 September, he repeated his feat of knocking down six enemy airplanes in a day, although this time three of his six victories were over Fokker D.VII fighters.

Another success two days later and two on 5 October put his score at 69, very close to the 72 of Major William Avery Bishop, then the leading Allied ace. On 30 October, he matched Bishop with three more victories. He shot down two more the following day, and another the day after that, finishing with 75 confirmed victories.

To summarize, he claimed 56 victories during the whole of 1918, attaining a total of 36 kills before May 1918. His 1918 list by itself would have made him France's leading ace. By the end of the war, he had accounted for all but 36 of Escadrille SPA.103's 111 claimed victories. Unlike many leading French aces, Fonck's score contained only three shared victories. Also unlike most aces, he remained unwounded; indeed, only a single enemy bullet had ever hit his aircraft. He had also forgone the most hazardous air-to-air combat: he shot down no observation balloons.

Yet for all his skill and success, Fonck never captured the hearts of the French public as Guynemer had. Fonck was ascetic and withdrawn. Instead of drinking or socializing with the other pilots, he planned his flying missions and tactics, ironed his uniforms, and stayed physically fit through calisthenics. He seemed to overcompensate for his shyness by constantly mentioning his exploits. As a result, he seemed distant, arrogant, even abrasive. His comrades respected his skills, but even one of his few friends, Marcel Haegelen, considered him a braggart and shameless self-promoter. Fonck may have resented the fact that Guynemer remained more popular in the French press even after he surpassed him in victories. Fonck also seemed to lack insight into the effect his personality had upon his image or career. However he and he alone carried the flag of the French Air Force at the victory parade on the Champs-Elysées.

== After the war ==
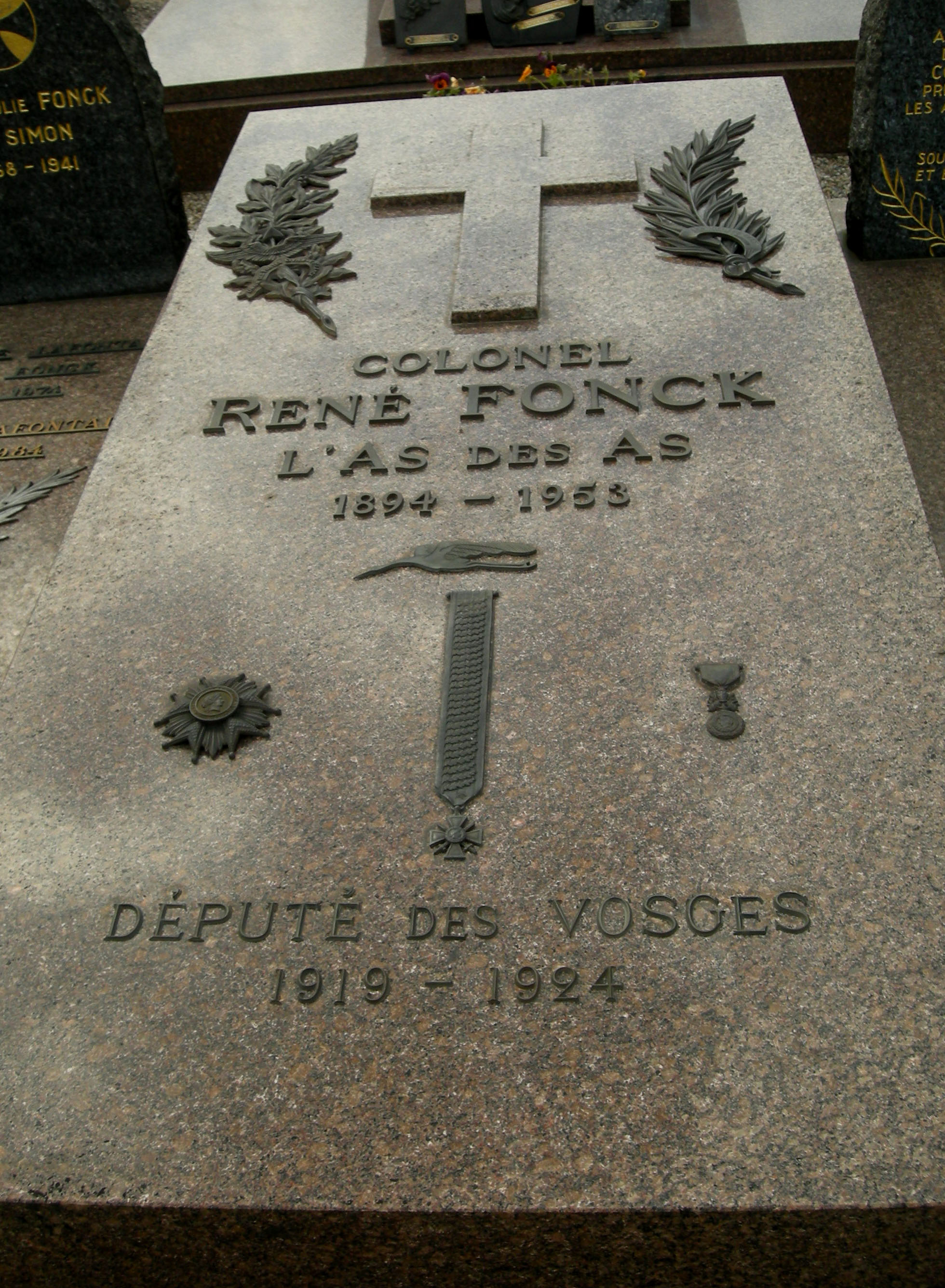
Grave of René Fonck

Fonck returned to civilian life after World War I, and published his war memoirs Mes Combats, prefaced by Marechal Foch, in 1920. The fame he got from the war allowed him to be elected Member of Parliament representing the Vosges from 1919 to 1924.

During the 1920s, Fonck persuaded Igor Sikorsky to redesign the Sikorsky S-35 for the transatlantic race or Orteig Prize. On 21 September 1926, the aircraft crashed on takeoff when the landing gear collapsed, killing two of his three crew members. Charles Lindbergh won the prize seven months later in 1927.

Fonck eventually returned to military aviation and rose to Inspector of French fighter forces from 1937 to 1939.

His inter-war contact with the likes of former World War I foe Hermann Göring and Ernst Udet cast a shadow upon Fonck's reputation during the German occupation of France, as did allegations of collaboration with the Nazis and the Vichy regime. In January 1941, Fonck was made a member of the National Council of Vichy France. On 10 August 1940, Vichy Foreign Minister Pierre Laval announced that Fonck had recruited 200 French pilots to fight on the Nazi side. However, the truth was more complicated. Marshal Philippe Pétain wished to exploit Fonck's relationship with Göring in order to meet Adolf Hitler. He ordered Colonel Fonck to talk to Göring. A meeting was planned at Montoire, but after discovering evidence about the pro-Nazi politics of Pierre Laval, Fonck tried to convince Pétain not to attend. Initially Pétain appeared to heed Fonck's advice, but for some reason he eventually decided to disregard Fonck's warnings and met Hitler at Montoire on 24 October 1940. Fonck's loyalties were thus questioned by the Vichy regime, and he returned home to Paris, where he was eventually arrested by the Gestapo and imprisoned in the Drancy internment camp.

After the war, a French police inquiry about his supposed collaboration with the Vichy regime completely cleared Fonck. The conclusion was that his loyalty was proved by his close contacts with recognised resistance leaders such as Alfred Heurtaux during the war. He was awarded the Certificate of Resistance in 1948. The citation reads: "Mr. Fonck, René, a member of the fighting French forces without uniform, took part, in territory occupied by the enemy, to glorious fights for the liberation of the nation".

Fonck remained in Paris, but also frequently visited his native Lorraine, where he had business interests.

He died of a stroke in his Paris apartment, Rue du Cirque, at the age of 59 and is buried in the cemetery of his native village of Saulcy-sur-Meurthe.

== Quotes ==
- "I put my bullets into the target as if I placed them there by hand."
- "I prefer to fly alone... when alone, I perform those little coups of audacity which amuse me..."

== Citations ==
Médaille militaire

A pilot of remarkable bravery and skill, having already engaged in a great number of aerial combats. On 6 August 1916, he resolutely attacked two strongly armed enemy planes, took on one in pursuit, and by a series of bold and skillful maneuvers, forced it to land uninjured within our lines. He has been cited in orders twice.

Médaille militaire citation, 1916

Légion d'honneur

A fighting pilot of great value, combining outstanding bravery and exceptional qualities of skill and sang-froid. He came to pursuit aviation after 500 hours of flight on army corps aircraft and became, in a short time, one of the best French combat pilots. On 19, 20 and 21 August 1917, he shot down his 8th, 9th and 10th enemy aircraft. He has already been cited seven times in orders, and has received the Médaille militaire for feats of war.

Légion d'honneur chevaliership in 1917. He was raised to the grade of Commander in 1921, and to the dignity of Grand Officer in 1936.

One of the most decorated French war heroes:

Remarkable officer from every point of view; of admirable fighting ardor. Pilot of the highest order, for reconnaissance missions and artillery range intelligence, as well as for surveillance service that he completed many times despite very unfavorable atmospheric conditions. He demonstrated, during the course of an uninterrupted series of aerial combats, an exceptional strength and will to win, which sets an example for the French chasse pilots of today. Has downed thirty six enemy planes.

Twenty eight army citations ("palmes"), and one bronze regimental citation ("étoile de bronze") attached to his War Cross. Recipient of the rarer Médaille militaire, and Chevalier de la Légion d'honneur for gallantry on the battle field ("faits de guerre") (to be distinguished from the Légion d'Honneur widely attributed to civilians).

Rene Fonck was also awarded the British Military Cross and the British Distinguished Conduct Medal.

== See also ==
- Ivan Kozhedub, the World War II "Allied Ace of Aces" with 62 aerial victories over opposing aircraft
- List of World War I flying aces
- List of people on the cover of Time Magazine: 1920s – 23 Aug. 1926
