= Raymond Orteig =

Hotel owner

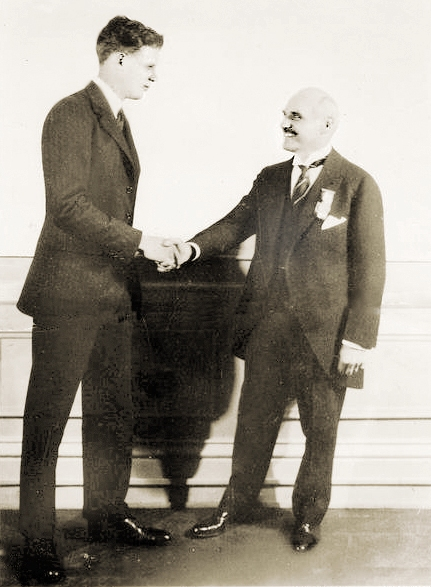
Charles Lindbergh (left) and Raymond Orteig

Raymond Orteig (1870 – 6 June 1939) was a French American hotel owner in New York City in the early 20th century. He is best known for setting up the $25,000 Orteig Prize in 1919 for the first non-stop transatlantic flight between New York City and Paris, which was claimed by Charles Lindbergh eight years later in 1927.

== Early life and business activities ==
Orteig was born in 1870 in the village of Louvie-Juzon in the region of Pyrénées-Atlantiques in southwest France. After spending part of his childhood looking after his father's sheep in the Pyrenees, Orteig emigrated at age 12, arriving in New York City on 13 October 1882 with 13 francs in his pocket to join an uncle already living there. He started working as a bar porter at Wengler's Restaurant on William Street on Lower Manhattan.

Gaining experience, he moved on to a position as waiter and then as a maître d' at the Martin Hotel on University Place on 9th Street, owned by Jean-Baptiste Martin. By the time Martin decided to move uptown in 1902, Orteig was in a position to buy the hotel, which he renamed Hotel Lafayette. Together with a business partner, Orteig was also able to lease the rundown Brevoort Hotel on the northeast corner of Fifth Avenue and 8th Street in Greenwich Village, and later refurbish it.

The Lafayette soon became a favourite gathering spot for airmen in the 1910s during and after World War I, and Orteig became acquainted with many of them, including French officers who were on temporary duty in the United States as advisors helping build the nascent United States Air Force. After the end of the World War I, whenever he could, he and his family would spend the summer in Louvie-Juzon. This lifelong interest in the region of his birth lead to him expanding his business by the purchasing the Henri IV Hotel in the town of Pau.

By his mid fifties Ortieg was in semi-retirement with daily operations at his establishments managed by his three sons and his business partner, Elie Pierre Daution. In 1925 Orteig and Daution funded a $200,000 refurbishment of the Brevoort Hotel.

His support of many charities and causes made him a leading figure in New York City's French community. This led to him being made a Chevalier of the Legion of Honour.

== Orteig Prize ==
In 1919 he attended a dinner in New York City organised by the Aero Club of America honouring the American flying ace Eddie Rickenbacker. Many of the speeches involved Franco-American friendship and Rickenbacker said he was looking forward to the day that the two countries are linked by air.

Inspired by Rickenbacker's speech, Orteig offered a prize of $25,000 to the first person of any Allied country to fly in one flight in either direction between New York City and Paris. The offer was made in a letter to Alan R. Hawley, then president of the Aero Club of America, on 22 May 1919. At the time, relations were strained between America and France because of the post-war negotiations at the Paris Peace Conference, so Orteig hoped that the prize would help improve relations between his adopted and native countries, as well encourage air travel and advertise his business. His offer was accepted by the Aero Club of America, who went on to set up a formal structure to administer it. The prize was initially set to be valid for five years.

After its original term had expired, Orteig reissued the Prize on 1 June 1925, by depositing $25,000 in negotiable securities at the Bryant Bank with the awarding put under the control of a seven-member board of trustees.

In May 1927, Orteig and his wife were on holiday in Pau, France, when he received a message from his son Raymond Jr that Charles Lindbergh had departed New York City. Orteig immediately travelled to Paris, arriving just before Lindbergh's Spirit of St. Louis touched down at Le Bourget. He was able to meet Lindbergh at the American Embassy on 22 May 1927, eight years to the day since he had first offered the prize.

Upon his departure from Paris to Belgium, Lindbergh dropped a message of thanks to Parisians from his plane as he flew over the Place de la Concorde. The message was attached to a French flag. Upon being retrieved, the flag was presented to Orteig who displayed it on the wall of the Lafayette in New York, until his family later removed it in protest at Lindbergh's involvement in the America First movement in the 1940s.

Upon Lindbergh's return to America, Orteig officially presented the Prize to him on 16 June 1927 at a ceremony held in the reception hall of the Breevort Hotel in New York City. Over the preceding decade, the Orteig Prize is said to have become an inspiring incentive and marked a major shift in aviation progress during the late 1920s and early 1930s.

Orteig died on 6 June 1939 at the French Hospital in New York City after a long illness, with 500 people attending his funeral.

He was married to French American Marie Ruisquès, by whom he had three sons, Evariste, Raymond Jr and Jean. The two oldest children married daughters of his longtime business partner Elie Daution.
