= USS Bear =

Dual steam-powered and sailing ship

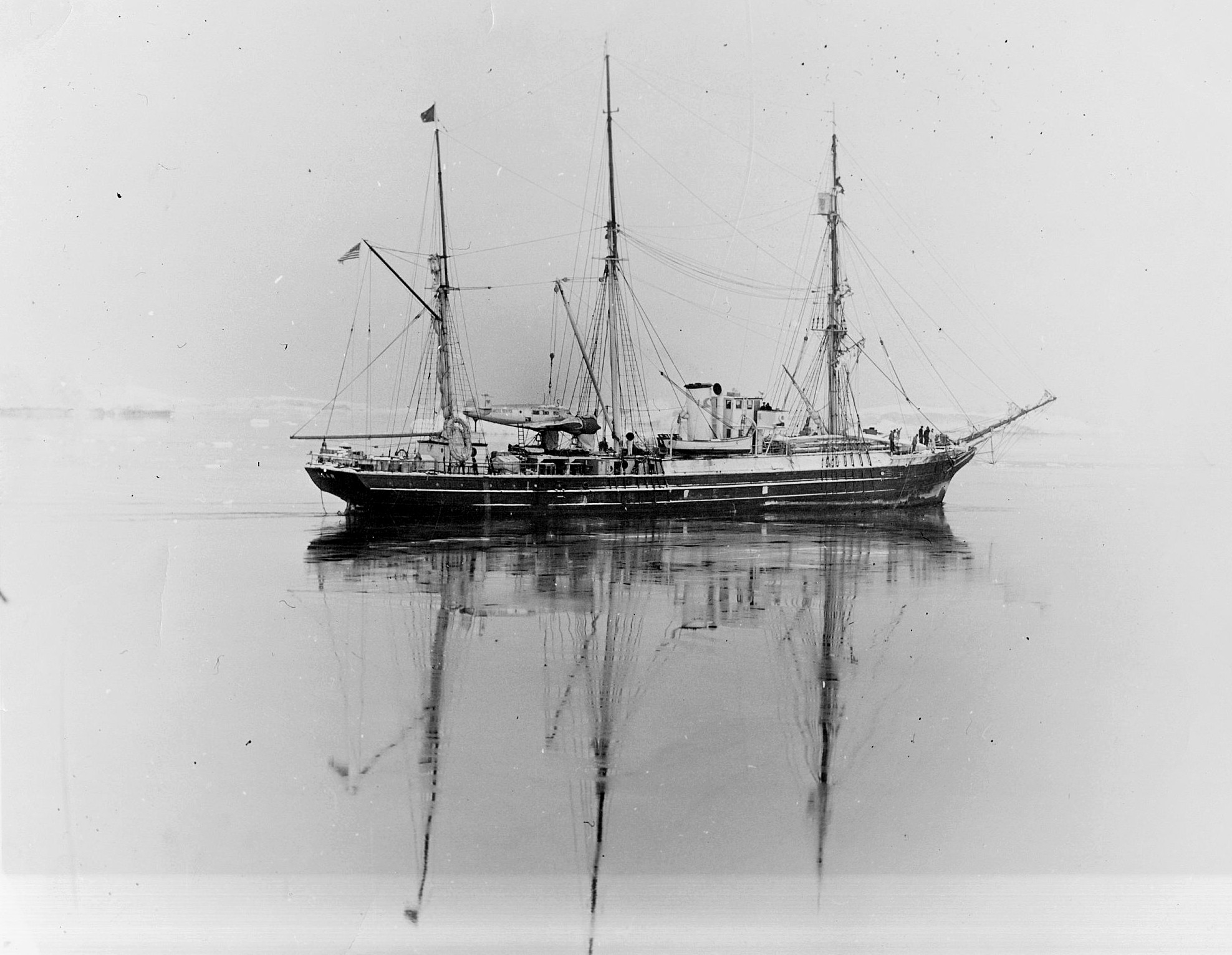
- USS Bear (AG-29) in Antarctica, 1939

History

Newfoundland
- Name: SS Bear
- Owner: W. Grieve, Sons & Company 1874–1879; R. Steele Jr 1880–1883
- Port of registry: St. John's, Newfoundland
- Builder: Alexander Stephen and Sons, Dundee, Scotland
- Launched: 1874
- Identification: Official Number: 66840
- Fate: Sold to U.S. government in 1884

United States
- Name: USRC Bear (1885–1915); USCGC Bear (1915–1926); Bear of Oakland (1926–1939); USS Bear (1939–1944); Arctic Bear (1944–1948)
- Commissioned: 1885
- Decommissioned: 1944
- In service: 1884–1929, 1939–1944
- Out of service: 1926–1938 (museum ship); 1944–1948 (laid up)
- Fate: Sold to Canadian owners for sealing in 1948
- Notes: Wireless call sign for USRC Bear was "RCB".

Canada
- Name: SS Arctic Bear
- Owner: Shaw Steamship Line
- Port of registry: Halifax, Nova Scotia
- Out of service: 1948–1961 (protracted refits); 1962 (restaurant conversion)
- Fate: Sank in the Atlantic, 19 March 1963, under tow

General characteristics
- Type: Ice-strengthened auxiliary steamer
- Displacement: 703 tons
- Length: 198.5 ft (60.5 m)
- Beam: 30 ft (9.1 m)
- Draft: 18.8 ft (5.7 m)
- Propulsion: 300 ihp (220 kW) compound steam engine, 1 screw
- Sail plan: Barquentine
- Range: Limited by water and provisions
- Complement: 51
- Aircraft carried: Carried Barkley-Grow seaplane on Byrd Expedition III

USS Bear was a dual steam-powered and sailing ship built with six-inch (15.2 cm)-thick sides which had a long life in various cold-water and ice-filled environments. She was a forerunner of modern icebreakers and had a diverse service life. According to the United States Coast Guard official website, Bear is described as "probably the most famous ship in the history of the Coast Guard."

Built in Scotland in 1874 as a steamer for sealing, she was owned and operated from Newfoundland for ten years. In the mid-1880s, she took part in the search for the Lady Franklin Bay Expedition. Commanded by Michael Healy of the United States Revenue-Marine, renamed the United States Revenue Cutter Service in 1894 (and one of the ancestor organizations of the United States Coast Guard), she worked the 20,000-mile (32,200 km) coastline of Alaska. She later assisted with relief efforts after the 1906 San Francisco earthquake.

Her services also included the second expedition of Admiral Richard E. Byrd to Antarctica, and again to the southernmost continent in 1941 to evacuate Americans at the beginning of World War II. She later served on patrol duty off the coast of Greenland for the United States Navy. Between some of these missions, she was a museum ship in Oakland, California, and starred in the 1930 film version of Jack London's The Sea-Wolf.

After World War II, Bear was returned to use again as a sealing vessel. Finally, in 1963, 89 years after she had been built, while being towed to a stationary assignment as a floating restaurant in Philadelphia, Pennsylvania, Bear foundered and sank in the North Atlantic Ocean about 100 nautical miles (190 km; 120 mi) south of Cape Sable Island, Nova Scotia, Canada.

== Construction and sealing career ==
Bear was built in 1874 as a sealer at the Panmure yard of Alexander Stephen and Sons in Dundee, Scotland. She was custom-built for sealing out of St. John's, Newfoundland, Bear was the most outstanding sealing vessel of her day, the lead ship in a new generation of sealers. Heavy-built with six-inch (15.2 cm) thick wooden planks, Bear was rigged as a sailing barquentine but her main power was a steam engine designed to smash deep into ice packs to reach seal herds. At the time of her arrival in St. John's, there were 300 vessels outfitted each season to hunt seals, but most were small schooners or old sailing barques. The new sealing ships represented by Bear radically transformed the Eastern North Atlantic seal fishery as they replaced the hundreds of smaller sealing vessels owned by merchants in outports around Newfoundland with large and expensive steamships owned by large British and Newfoundland companies based in St. John's. Owned at first by the Scottish firm W. Grieve and Sons, she was acquired in 1880 by R. Steele Junior. Bear spent a decade sealing from St. John's. In 1884, the Steeles sent Bear back to Scotland for a refit.

== American government service ==
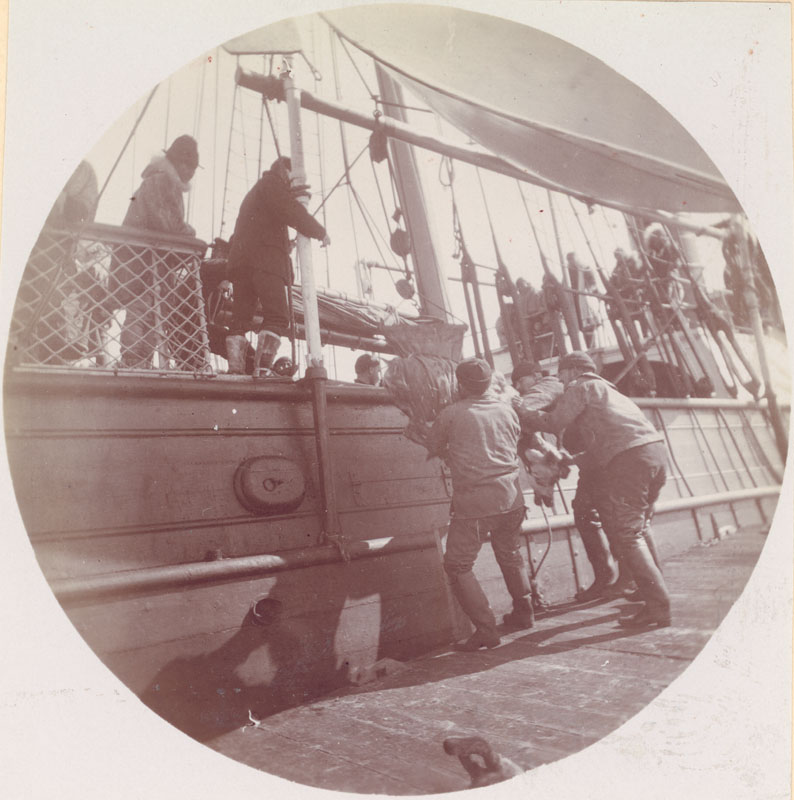
Men loading reindeer onto USRC Bear

The massive wooden hulls of Newfoundland sealing vessels had proved ideal for Arctic exploration. Just back from her refit in 1884 and ready for another season of sealing, Bear was instead purchased by the U.S. government in 1884. Under command of Commander Winfield Scott Schley, Bear and took part in the search for the Lady Franklin Bay Expedition, whose seven survivors were found at Cape Sabine.

Bear served as a revenue cutter in the United States Revenue-Marine, renamed the United States Revenue Cutter Service in 1894, from 1885 to 1915 and as a cutter in the United States Coast Guard from 1915 to 1926. Throughout the years from 1885 to 1926, she made the seasonal trek each May from her port in Oakland, California, to sail north to the waters of the Territory of Alaska for the five-month season, cruising 10,000 nautical miles (19,000 km; 12,000 mi) on the Bering Sea Patrol, where she looked out for seal poachers, shipwrecked whalers, and illicit trade with Alaska Natives, ferried reindeer from Siberia to Alaska, and served as a floating courthouse. By order of the United States Department of the Treasury, Bear was given free run to arrest and seize possessions of poachers, smugglers, and illegal traders, as well as take census of people and ships, record geological and astronomical information, take note of tides, and escort whaling ships.

One captain of Bear, Michael "Hell Roaring Mike" Healy, was considered a savior by many of the whalers and native Eskimos, as he bought Siberian reindeer at his own expense for the starving natives to use as the foundation for a new herd in Alaska, paralleling, and possibly in cooperation with, missionary Sheldon Jackson. During Captain Healy's and Bear's 1891 Bering Sea Patrol, the following was accomplished:

- secured witnesses for a murder trial
- ferried reindeer
- sailed the Alaskan governor
- transported a U.S. geographical survey team
- carried lumber and supplies for school construction in remote areas
- delivered teachers to their remote assignments
- delivered mail for the U.S. Post Office Department
- enforced federal laws
- provided medical support to natives
- conducted search and rescue

During one of her yearly trips back to San Francisco, Bear assisted in rescue operations for 1906 San Francisco earthquake. The Revenue Cutter Service was merged with the United States Life-Saving Service to form the United States Coast Guard on 28 January 1915 and the ship was renamed USCGC Bear. (Note: After 28 January 1915 the Revenue Cutter Service was merged with the United States Life-Saving Service to form the United States Coast Guard. The prefix for Revenue Cutter Service vessels was changed from USRC to USCGC, thus; USRC Bear became USCGC Bear.)

== Bear of Oakland ==
Cruising to Alaska for her last patrol in the 1926 season, on her return to Oakland that November she was replaced by a new cutter, USCGC Northland and ownership was transferred to the city for use as a large barquentine-rigged museum ship, Bear starred as the sealer Macedonia in the 1930 film version of Jack London's The Sea-Wolf.

In 1932 Bear of Oakland was purchased by Rear Admiral Richard E. Byrd for $1,050, as a replacement for the barquentine City of New York. He used her in the Second Byrd Expedition alongside the old steel-hulled lumber ship Pacific Fir, renamed by Byrd Jacob Ruppert, in honor of the New York brewer who was a major sponsor of expedition.

After the expedition, Admiral Byrd leased Bear to the Navy for one dollar a year, for use on his government sponsored (third) expedition.

== United States Antarctic Service Expedition ==
On 11 September 1939 she was re-commissioned in the U.S. Navy for service during the 1939–1941 United States Antarctic Service Expedition, led by Rear Admiral Richard E. Byrd, and renamed USS Bear (AG-29). She carried a Barkley-Grow seaplane on board. Lieutenant Commander Richard H. Cruzen was captain of Bear during the expedition. Cruzen would rise to the rank of rear admiral and commanded the U.S. Navy ships which participated in a large Antarctic expedition named Operation Highjump in 1948.

In early 1941, USS Bear assisted in the evacuation of the members of the Antarctic Expedition, as international tensions rose in the months that led up to America's entrance into World War II. Bear arrived at the Mikkelsen Islands, just north of the Antarctic Circle, on 16 March 1941, and its crew helped to build an adequate airstrip to evacuate personnel and equipment from the expedition base in the area.

== World War II ==
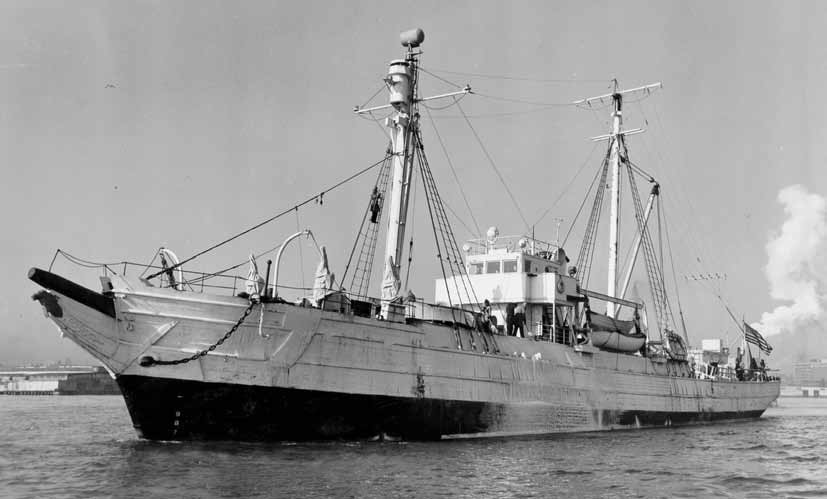
USS Bear circa 1944

From 1941 to 1944, Bear served in the Northeast Atlantic Greenland Patrol. The rigging was cut down to two masts to become a fully motorized ship. After the capture, on 12 September 1941, of the German-controlled Norwegian sealer Buskø, which was used as a supply ship for secret weather stations, by USCGC Northland; Bear towed the prize to Boston. When more modern ships were available to replace her, Bear was decommissioned on 17 May 1944 and laid up in Boston until the end of the war.

Bear had the distinction of being the oldest U.S. Navy ship to be deployed outside the continental United States during World War II. She was one of the last ships equipped with sails to serve in a theater of war. The sailing relics USS Constitution and USS Constellation were both in active commissioned service during World War II, but neither left port during the war.

== Postwar ==
Bear was purchased from the U.S. government in 1948 by Frank M. Shaw of Halifax, Nova Scotia for $5,199. Shaw intended to use the ship for sealing. Renamed Arctic Bear, her refit for sealing proved costly and with the decline of the large-scale Newfoundland seal hunt, she was laid up in Halifax Harbour subject to on and off again refits, and lay derelict for periods of times as she remained at various moorings around Halifax and Dartmouth.

By the early 1960s Bear was considered for restoration as a museum ship by the City of Dartmouth as well as her old home at Oakland and by the San Francisco marine museum. However the purchase price from Shaw Steamships and the extensive restoration costs scuttled museum plans.

In 1962 she was purchased by Alfred Johnston of Philadelphia for a floating seafood restaurant. Repairs were made to the ship at Industrial Shipping Limited in Mahone Bay, Nova Scotia for her new role including the carving of a new bear figurehead.

== Sinking ==
In 1963, while in tow by the tug Irving Birch to Philadelphia, Bear foundered about 100 nautical miles (190 km; 120 mi) south of Cape Sable Island, Nova Scotia, at 42°40′N 065°11′W. She went down early in the morning of 19 March 1963 after a gale struck and severed the tow line. The mast collapsed and punctured the hull, causing the sinking. Her crew of two were rescued by Irving Birch.

== Discovery of wreck ==
The search for Bear′s wreck began in 1979, when Dr. Harold "Doc" Edgerton of the Massachusetts Institute of Technology (MIT), the inventor of side-scan sonar, used a side-scan sonar deployed from a United States Coast Guard buoy tender to look for the wreck in the vicinity of Bear′s sinking. His effort was unsuccessful, but other searches of the area ensued over the next 42 years, involving a variety of actors including MIT; the U.S. Navy; various elements of the U.S. Coast Guard including the Chief Historian′s Office, the Coast Guard Research and Development Center, and the United States Coast Guard Academy; the National Oceanic and Atmospheric Administration (NOAA); the Woods Hole Oceanographic Institution; the Commonwealth of Massachusetts; and the Government of Canada. Finally, a search conducted from 14 to 28 September 2021 by elements of NOAA and the U.S. Coast Guard in cooperation with various academic researchers confirmed that a wreck discovered in 2019 on the floor of the Atlantic Ocean in Canada′s exclusive economic zone approximately 260 nautical miles (482 km; 299 mi) east of Boston and 90 nautical miles (167 km; 104 mi) south of Cape Sable, Nova Scotia, Canada, was that of Bear. On 14 October 2021, NOAA Commissioned Officer Corps Rear Admiral Nancy Hann announced the discovery in a press conference held on a pier in Boston adjacent to the Coast Guard icebreaker USCGC Healy (WAGB-20).

== Legacy ==
Bear's career lasted for 89 years. She spent a total of 47 years in commissioned service of the United States Revenue Cutter Service, Coast Guard and Navy. She was one of only a few ships to have served in both polar regions. She is also one of the very few ships to be on active service in the U.S. Armed Forces during the Spanish-American War, World War I and World War II.

On February 4, 1983, USCGC Bear (WMEC-901), the lead ship of the Famous class of medium endurance Coast Guard cutters was commissioned.

There is a large detailed scale model of Bear on display in the Stockton Center for International Law, part of the United States Naval War College in Newport, Rhode Island.

The figurehead from Bear is in the collection at the Mariners' Museum in Newport News, Virginia.

The mascot of the United States Coast Guard Academy is Objee the bear, inspired by the Coast Guard Cutter Bear. The athletic teams of the Coast Guard Academy are called the Coast Guard Bears.

== Awards ==
- Spanish Campaign Medal
- World War I Victory Medal with "ASIATIC" clasp
- Second Byrd Antarctic Expedition Medal
- United States Antarctic Expedition Medal
- American Defense Service Medal with "A" device
- American Campaign Medal
- European-African-Middle Eastern Campaign Medal
- World War II Victory Medal
- Coast Guard Arctic Service Medal

== References used ==
- "Bear, 1885". Cutters, Craft & U.S. Coast Guard Manned Army & Navy Vessels. U.S. Coast Guard Historian's Office.
- United States. Revenue-Cutter Service (1898). Report of the cruise of the U.S. Revenue Cutter Bear and the overland expedition for the relief of the whalers in the Arctic ocean, from November 27, 1897, to September 13, 1898. Washington, D.C.: Government Printing Office.
- "General Order No. 1" (PDF). Historic Documents & Publications. U.S. Coast Guard Historian's Office.
