= China Service Medal =

U.S. military service medal

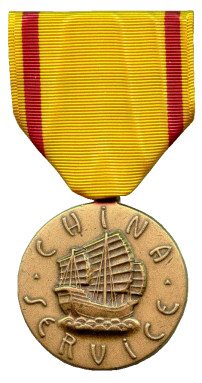
- Obverse
- Type: Military medal Service medal
- Awarded for: Services performed during operations in China or in Chinese territorial waters or contiguous ocean areas from 7 July 1937 to 7 September 1939 and 2 September 1945 to 1 April 1957
- Presented by: the Department of the Navy
- Eligibility: Navy, Marine Corps and Coast Guard personnel
- Status: Obsolete
- Established: 1 July 1942
- Ribbon bar and Campaign streamer

Precedence
- Next (higher): Navy: Second Byrd Antarctic Expedition Medal; Marine Corps: Marine Corps Expeditionary Medal; Coast Guard: Second Byrd Antarctic Expedition Medal
- Next (lower): American Defense Service Medal

The China Service Medal was a service medal awarded to U.S. Navy, Marine Corps, and Coast Guard personnel. The medal was instituted by Navy Department General Order No. 176 on 1 July 1942. The medal recognized service in and around China before and after World War II.

== Criteria ==
Served ashore in China or who were attached to any of the vessels that operated in support of the operations in China between 7 July 1937, and 7 September 1939.

1. The commemorative purposes for which the China Service Medal was established and authorized by General Order No. 176, dated 1 July 1942, are extended to include the services performed by personnel of the Navy, Marine Corps, and Coast Guard during the operations in China subsequent to 2 September 1945, and until a terminal date to be designated. It is further provided that the Secretary of the Navy may tender this medal to personnel of the Army or other components of the Armed Forces of the United States for service which he may determine to be commensurate with and consistent with the services for which the award is made to personnel in the naval service, and this provision for tender shall apply for all periods of time for which award of this medal is authorized. Served ashore in China or were attached to any of the vessels that operated in support of operations in China between September 2, 1945, and April 1, 1957.

2. The medal will be awarded to individuals who shall have been attached to, present, and serving on permanent duty with an organization of the naval service of the United States credited by the Secretary of the Navy with having participated in operations in China. Service In a passenger status, or as an observer, visitor, courier, escort, inspector, or other similar status when not permanently attached to an eligible unit, is not creditable toward eligibility for the above medal. Services performed in the Asiatic-Pacific area between 3 September 1945 and 2 March 1946, inclusive, shall not be credited toward individual eligibility for the China Service Medal unless the individual is already eligible for the Asiatic-Pacific Campaign Medal for services performed prior to 2 September 1945.

3. Organizations will, consistent with the above dates, be credited with qualifying service for services performed on shore in China and such adjacent islands and territories as are recognized to be Chinese, or in ships operating in such territorial waters or contiguous ocean areas, or in aircraft based upon and operating from such territories or ships.

4. The China Service Medal shall not be awarded for any service for which another service medal is authorized except as provided in paragraph 2 above and not more than one medal shall be awarded to any individual. No clasps, distinguishing devices, or other insignia are authorized to be worn on the corresponding service ribbon except that Individuals to whom the medal has been or may be awarded for service performed under General Order No. 176, of 1 July 1942, shall upon becoming eligible for this award for service performed subsequent to 2 September 1945, wear a bronze star signifying the second award on the ribbon of the medal and on the service ribbon. .

Regulations permit the wearing of a bronze service star if a service member had performed duty during both periods of eligibility. The China Service Medal is no longer awarded by the United States Navy.

== Appearance ==
Designed by American sculptor George Holburn Snowden, the medal is bronze, 1.25 inches in diameter. The center of the obverse bears a three-sailed Chinese junk borne upon scroll waves. The boat is surrounded by the inscription in relief China Service, in an Asian-style font.

The reverse of the medal bears a bald eagle facing left. The eagle clutches laurels while perched on the horizontal shank of an anchor with its flukes to the right. On the left side of the eagle is the word For and the right side Service. Arching above the eagle is one of two inscriptions United States Navy for the version awarded to sailors or United States Marine Corps for the version awarded to Marines.

The suspension ribbon, and service ribbon, for the medal is gold with red stripes at either side.

== Notable recipients ==
- Jimmy Carter: US President
- Gene Hackman: actor
- John Glenn: Astronaut

== See also ==
- Awards and decorations of the United States military
- Yangtze Service Medal
