= Peary Polar Expedition Medal =

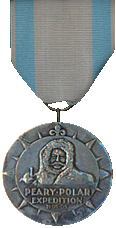
- Type: Military medal Service medal
- Awarded for: Valuable services to the Nation in the field of polar exploration and science
- Presented by: United States Congress
- Eligibility: Members of the Peary Polar Expedition
- Status: Obsolete

Highlights
- Total: 6
- Ribbon bar of the medal

Precedence
- Next (higher): Sampson Medal
- Next (lower): NC-4 Medal
- Related: Byrd Antarctic Expedition Medal; Second Byrd Antarctic Expedition Medal; United States Antarctic Expedition Medal; Antarctica Service Medal

The Peary Polar Expedition Medal was a commemorative medal awarded to six of the participants of the 1908–1909 Expedition to the North Pole, led by Robert Peary. Authorized by Congress in 1944, the silver medals were presented by the Secretary of the Navy.

== Establishment ==
The medal was established by Private Law 78-166 on January 28, 1944. The law was entitled, "An act to provide for the presentation of silver medals to certain members of the Peary Polar Expedition of 1908-1909." The law authorized the Secretary of the Navy to have made at the United States Mint, silver medals with which to reward six individuals for their service to the expedition. The medals were to be presented in the name of Congress. Absent from the list of recipients was Peary himself.

== Appearance ==
The medal is 1 1/2 inches (3.8 cm) in diameter. The obverse depicts a figure of Peary in a fur hooded parka, holding the tip of a walking pole in his right hand. Below the figure of Peary are the words in three lines: PEARY POLAR EXPEDITION 1908-09. Around the outside are the points of a compass rose with north being indicated at the top by a fleur-de-lis.

The reverse bears the eight line inscription: PRESENTED IN THE NAME OF CONGRESS IN RECOGNITION OF HIS EFFORTS AND SERVICES AS A MEMBER OF THE PEARY POLAR EXPEDITION OF 1908-09 IN THE FIELD OF SCIENCE AND FOR THE CAUSE OF POLAR EXPLORATION BY AIDING IN THE DISCOVERY OF THE NORTH POLE BY ADMIRAL PEARY. Above the inscription is an American flag with a sled dog on either side. Below the inscription is a space to engrave the recipient's name resting on the depiction of snowshoes at the bottom.

The medal is suspended from a white ribbon with an ice-blue 1/4-inch (0.64 cm) stripe toward each edge.

== Recipients ==
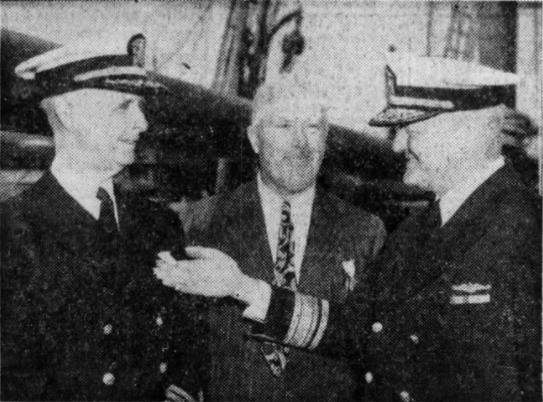
Bartlett (left) and MacMillan (center) receiving their medals in May 1945

The six recipients of the medal, specified in the authorizing act of Congress, were:

- Captain Robert A. Bartlett (1875–1946)
- George Borup (1885–1912)
- Dr. John Goodsell (1873–1949)
- Matthew A. Henson (1866–1955)
- Rear Admiral Donald B. MacMillan, USNR (1874–1970)
- Ross Gilmore Marvin (1880–1909)

Although eligible, Peary himself was not awarded the medal, for unknown reasons.

MacMillan and Bartlett received their medals in May 1945; Goodsell and Henson received theirs the following month. Borup's sister accepted his medal in June 1945, and Marvin's family received his medal in 1949.
