= George J. Dufek =

United States naval admiral (1903–1977)

George John Dufek
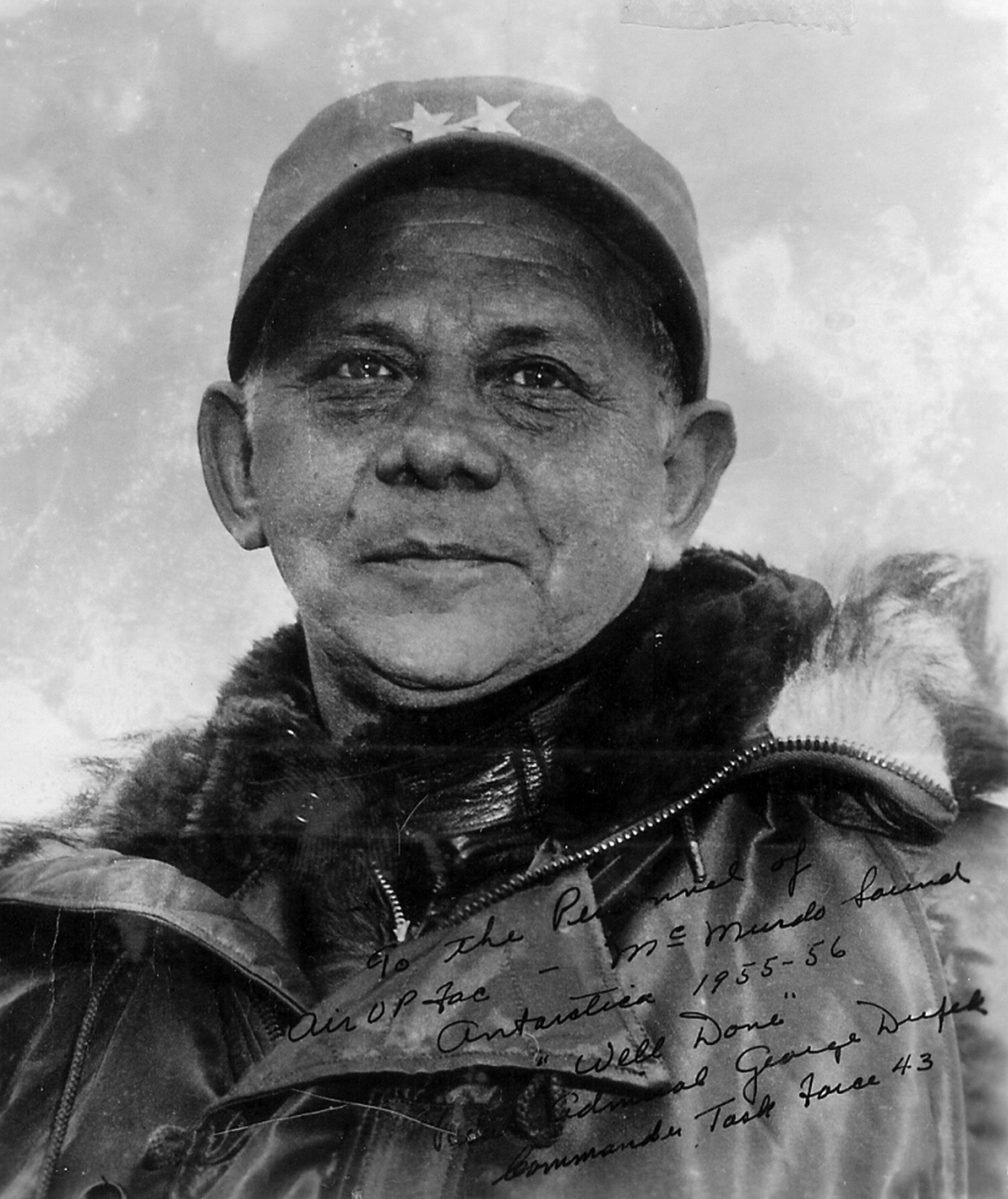
- Born: February 10, 1903; Rockford, Illinois
- Died: February 10, 1977 (aged 74); Bethesda, Maryland
- Military career
- Allegiance: United States
- Branch: United States Navy
- Service years: 1921–1959
- Rank: Rear Admiral
- Commands: USS Bogue; USS Antietam
- Conflicts: World War II; Korean War
- Awards: Distinguished Service Medal (2); Legion of Merit (2); Croix de Guerre; Légion d'honneur
- Other work: Director, Mariners' Museum, Newport News, Virginia

George John Dufek (February 10, 1903 – February 10, 1977) was an American naval officer, naval aviator, and polar expert. He served in World War II and the Korean War and in the 1940s and 1950s spent much of his career in the Antarctic, first with Admiral Byrd and later as supervisor of U.S. programs in the South Polar regions. Rear Admiral Dufek was the director of the Mariners' Museum in Newport News, Virginia after his retirement from the Navy in 1959.

== Background and military career ==
Born in Rockford, Illinois, he joined the Reserve Officer Training Corps (ROTC) at his local high school and was appointed to the U.S. Naval Academy in Annapolis, Maryland in 1921. Upon graduation in 1925 he received his ensign's commission and commenced his career aboard the battleship USS Maryland. He was later assigned to the submarine USS S-39 and was promoted to lieutenant (junior grade) in 1928.

In 1932 he entered flight training school at the Naval Air Station Pensacola, Florida; after graduating as a naval aviator in 1933 he served as navigator and executive officer on three different ships. He was promoted to lieutenant in 1935 and assigned to the aircraft carrier USS Saratoga in 1938.

During World War II Dufek commanded a flight training squadron, served as senior naval aviator in Algeria during the invasion of North Africa, assisted in the planning for the invasion of Sicily and Salerno and, after his promotion to captain and subsequent reassignment, the invasion of southern France. In September 1944 he assumed command of the escort carrier USS Bogue, which, on 24 April 1945, along with its escorts, sank the U-546, the last of 13 submarines (11 German and 2 Japanese) sunk by Bogue during World War II.

During the Korean War the Navy placed Dufek in command of the aircraft carrier USS Antietam from 17 January 1951 – 6 May 1952. Antietam operated off the coast of the Korean peninsula from October 1951 to April 1952 and received four battle stars.

Dufek was then given command of the naval installation on Kwajalein in the Pacific and, finally, the Naval Air Station Whidbey Island in Oak Harbor, Washington.

Dufek retired from the Navy on 30 June 1955 and was promoted to the rank of rear admiral in recognition of his wartime accomplishments the same day. He continued to serve on active duty so he could participate in Operation Deep Freeze.

== Antarctic experience ==
=== With Richard Byrd ===
In the spring of 1939, Dufek, at this time a lieutenant, requested and received an assignment to Rear Admiral Richard E. Byrd's third expedition to Antarctica, which was officially named the United States Antarctic Service Expedition, where he served as navigator of the USS Bear, the flagship of the expedition. In recognition of his many hours of exploratory flying over the South Polar continent, Dufek later received the United States Antarctic Expedition Medal.

=== Operation Highjump ===
After a brief postwar stint in Japan, Dufek was assigned as chief staff officer to a U.S. Navy-Coast Guard task force to establish weather bases in the polar regions. While there he participated in Operation Highjump, a Naval expedition to Antarctica under the command of Byrd. He served as commander of the Eastern Group (Task Group 68.3) which consisted of a seaplane tender, a destroyer and a tanker.

During Operation Highjump he made the first flight over the Thurston Peninsula and later led the rescue of six survivors of a crash of another flight (named George 1) over the same area.

He returned to Washington D.C. briefly, but by 1947 was back in the Antarctic, this time commanding a task force sent to supply existing weather stations and to establish new ones near the pole.

=== Operation Deepfreeze ===
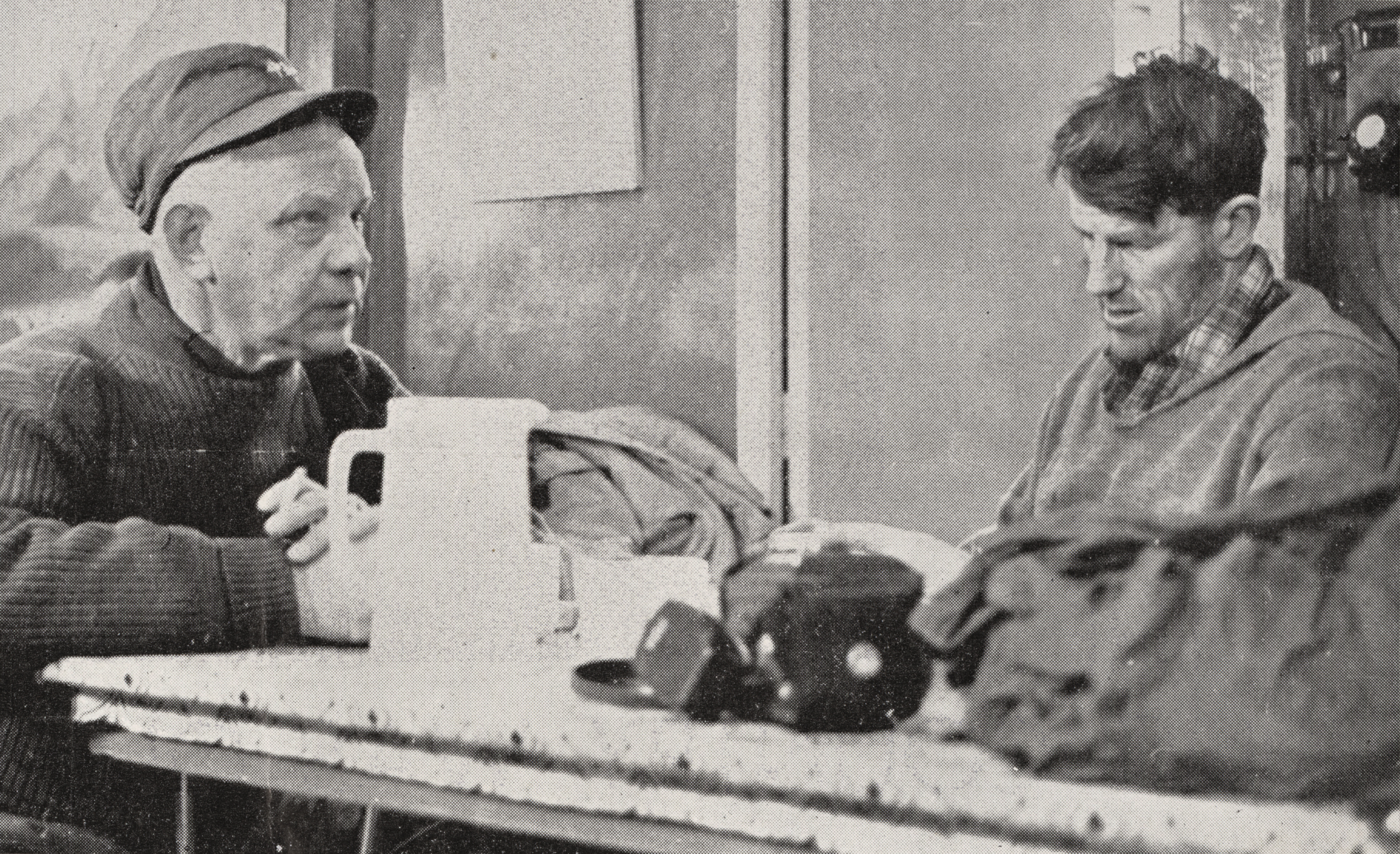
Dufek (left) discusses final plans for the Commonwealth Trans-Antarctic Expedition with Sir Edmund Hillary at Scott Base, 1957.

In 1954 Dufek joined a special Antarctic planning group preparing for the Navy's Operation Deep Freeze, a scientific polar research expedition. When planning was complete Dufek was given command of Task Force 43 which, with more than 80 officers and 1000 enlisted men, three ice-breakers, and three cargo ships, was charged with logistics and support for the expedition. Dufek's first flagship for the operation was the attack cargo ship USS Arneb. He later transferred his flag to the icebreaker USS Glacier and was on board the Glacier when she completed a circumnavigation of the Antarctic continent later in the expedition.

Among other accomplishments, the task force established bases on Ross Island and in Little America, and on October 31, 1956, Admiral Dufek and a crew of six, having flown on a ski equipped US Navy R4D-5 Skytrain named Que Sera Sera, became the first Americans to set foot at the South Pole and to plant the American flag, and the first men to land on the pole from the air.

On November 28, 1957, Dufek was present with a US congressional delegation during a change of command ceremony held at McMurdo Sound. After Admiral Byrd's death, Dufek was appointed to succeed him as supervisor of U.S. programs in the South Polar Regions.

== Retirement and death ==
Dufek fully retired from the Navy in 1959. He died in 1977, on his 74th birthday.

== Namesakes ==
Antarctic features Dufek Coast, Dufek Head, Dufek Massif, and Dufek Mountain were named in his honor.

== Awards ==

	Naval Aviator Badge		
	Submarine Warfare insignia		
1st Row	Navy Distinguished Service Medal with Gold Star	Legion of Merit with two Gold Stars and Combat "V"	United States Antarctic; Expedition Medal issued in Gold (1939–1941)
2nd Row	American Defense Service Medal	American Campaign Medal	European-African-Middle Eastern; Campaign Medal with 4 battle stars
3rd Row	World War II Victory Medal	Navy Occupation Medal with "ASIA" clasp	National Defense Service Medal
4th Row	Korean Service Medal with four battle stars	Antarctic Service Medal	Chevalier of the Legion of Honor
5th Row	Croix de Guerre (1939–1945) with Palm	Korean Presidential Unit Citation	United Nations Korea Medal -

== Additional Awards and Honors ==
- Golden Plate Award, American Academy of Achievement, 1961

== Dates of rank ==
- Midshipman – August 1921
- Ensign – June 1925
- Lieutenant (junior grade) – June 1928
- Lieutenant – June 1935
- Lieutenant Commander – August 1939
- Commander – August 1942
- Captain – July 1943
- Rear Admiral, Retired – June 1955

== Bibliography ==
- 1957: Operation Deepfreeze. New York: Harcourt, Brace. ISBN 1-112-16344-1.
- 1959: Through the Frozen Frontier: The Exploration of Antarctica. Harcourt, Brace. ISBN 1-112-98569-7.
- 1969: Rear Admiral Richard Evelyn Byrd: A Biography. Harcourt, Brace and the Virginia Institute of Marine Science, The College of William & Mary. ASIN B0007H4TRQ
