= United States Antarctic Service Expedition =

Expedition to Antarctica

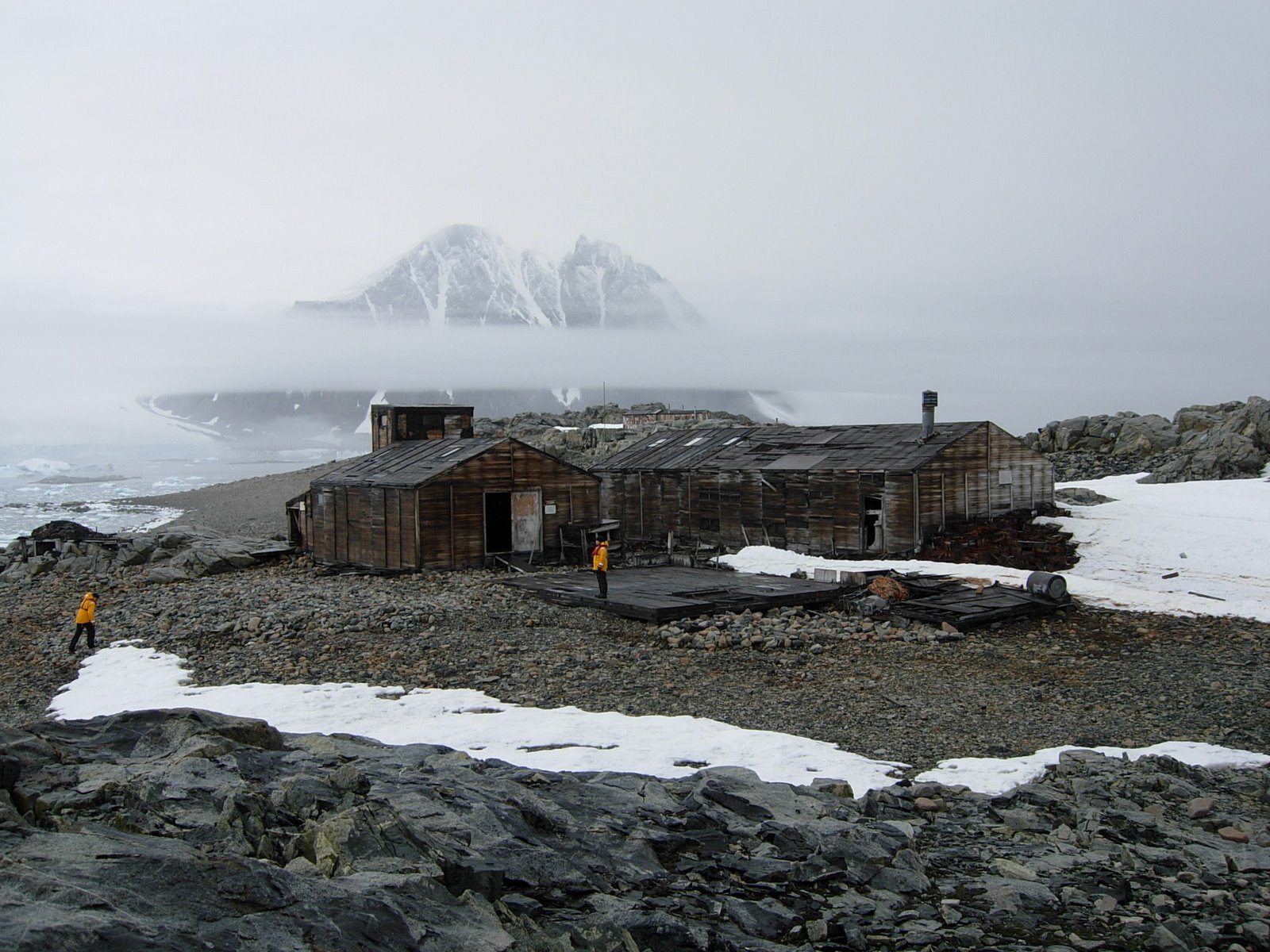
East Base on Stonington Island, 21st century

The United States Antarctic Service Expedition (1939–1941), often referred to as Byrd's Third Antarctic Expedition, was an expedition jointly sponsored by the United States Navy, State Department, Department of the Interior and The Treasury. Although a U.S.-government sponsored expedition, additional support came from donations and gifts by private citizens, corporations and institutions.

== Description of expedition ==
=== Background, orders and goals ===
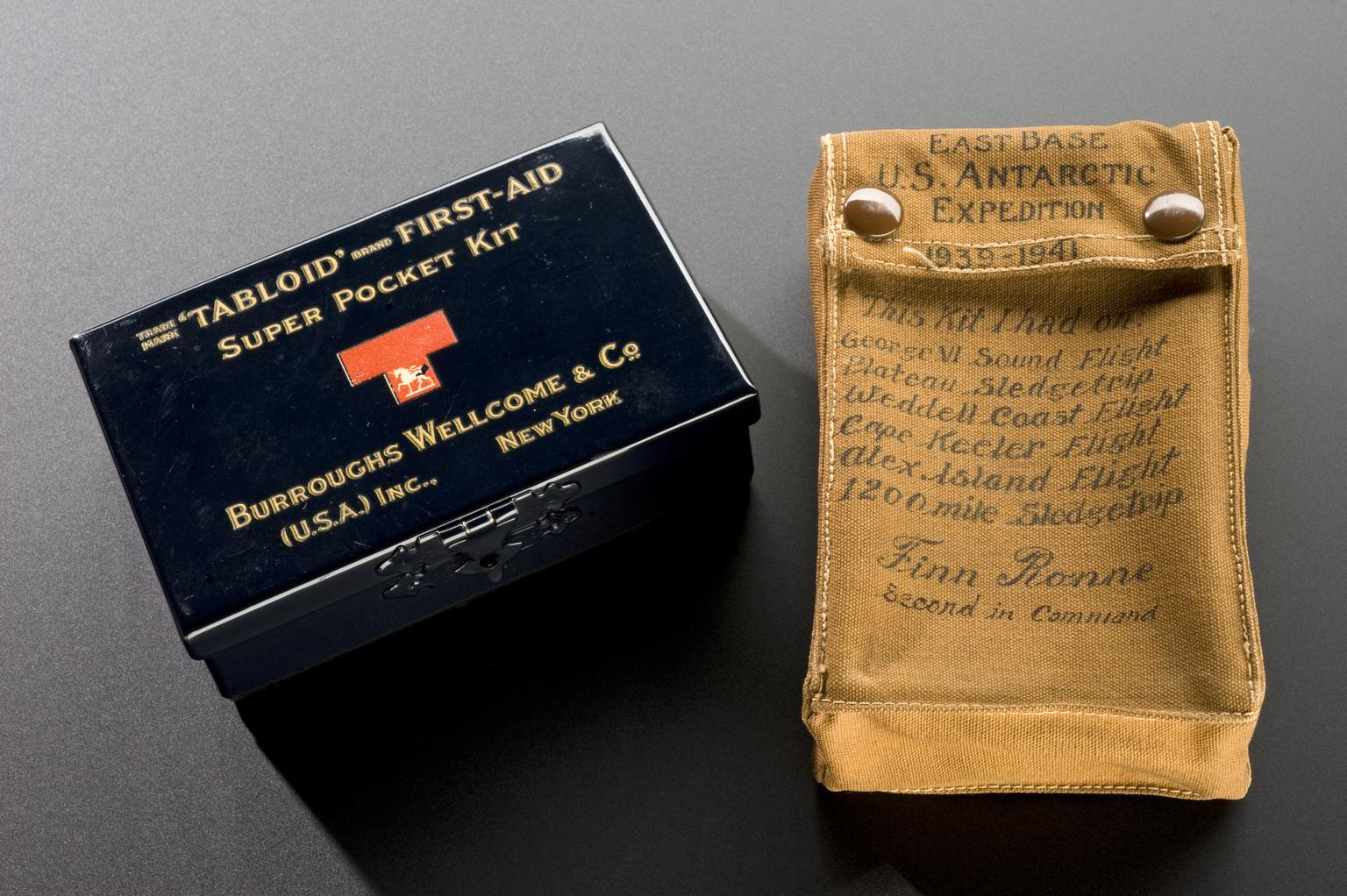
First aid kit taken on the expedition

Rear Admiral Richard Evelyn Byrd donated many of the supplies that he had gathered for his own expedition, the largest item being the Bear of Oakland, commissioned as the USS Bear (AG-29) on 11 September 1939. A second ship, the USMS North Star, a 1434-ton wooden ice ship built for the Bureau of Indian Affairs, was supplied by the Department of the Interior.

A total of 125 men departed from the United States in the two ships of the United States Antarctic Service Expedition. Most of the men who made up the expedition were solicited from the military ranks, civilian agencies of government and scientific institutions. A few volunteers were employed by the Department of the Interior for $10 per month, food and clothing included. A total of 59 men, divided initially into three groups, wintered in Antarctica.

The objectives of the expedition were outlined in an order from President Franklin D. Roosevelt dated November 25, 1939. The President wanted two bases to be established: East Base, in the vicinity of Charcot Island or Alexander I Land, or on Marguerite Bay if no accessible site could be found on either of the specified islands; and West Base, in the vicinity of King Edward VII Land, but if this proved impossible, a site on the Bay of Whales at or near Little America was to be investigated, and delineation of the continental coast line between the meridians 72 degrees W., and 148 degrees W. In view of the broad scope of the objectives and the unpredictable circumstances that always arise in Antarctica, it is remarkable that most of the objectives set for them were met.

The expedition also took a M2A2 Light Tank, and a T3E4 Carrier, both of which performed well, but were too heavy for the terrain and were abandoned.

=== Accomplishments and noteworthy events ===
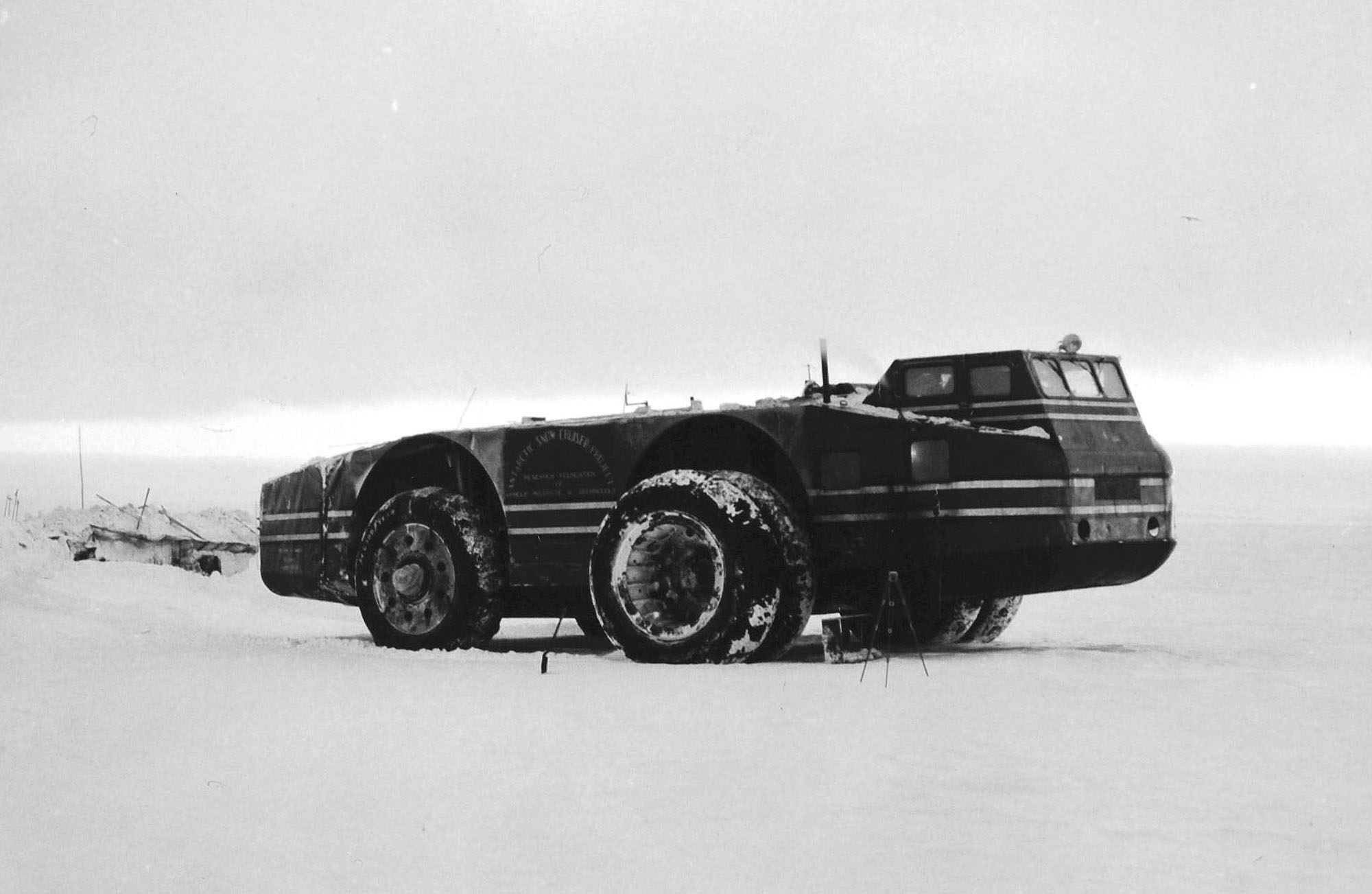
The Antarctic Snow Cruiser, 1940

The visionary but ill-fated Antarctic Snow Cruiser, a vehicle having several innovative features, was used by the expedition but it generally failed to operate as hoped for under the difficult conditions and was eventually abandoned in Antarctica. It was rediscovered in 1958 but has since been presumed to have been lost due to the breaking off and eventual melting of the ice floe it was on.

Aboard the USS Bear was George Washington Gibbs Jr. who became the first African-American to set foot on the continent of Antarctica during the expedition. Gibbs served as a Mess Attendant 1st Class aboard the USS Bear but also worked as a cook and performed other tasks with the expedition.

=== Mission termination and aftermath ===
With international tensions on the rise, it was considered wise to evacuate the two bases rather than relieve the present personnel with new men who would continue to occupy the bases. It was hoped that one day this base would be reoccupied, so much of the equipment and supplies were left behind as the two ships sailed from West Base on February 1, 1941. The evacuation of East Base was concluded on March 22 and both ships sailed immediately. The USMS North Star arrived in Boston on May 5 and the USS Bear on May 18.

On September 24, 1945, Congress directed (Public Law 79-185, 59 Stat. 536) that such number of gold, silver, and bronze medals—at the discretion of the Secretary of the Navy—be presented to members of the United States Antarctic Expedition of 1939-1941, in recognition of their valuable services to the nation in the field of polar exploration and science.

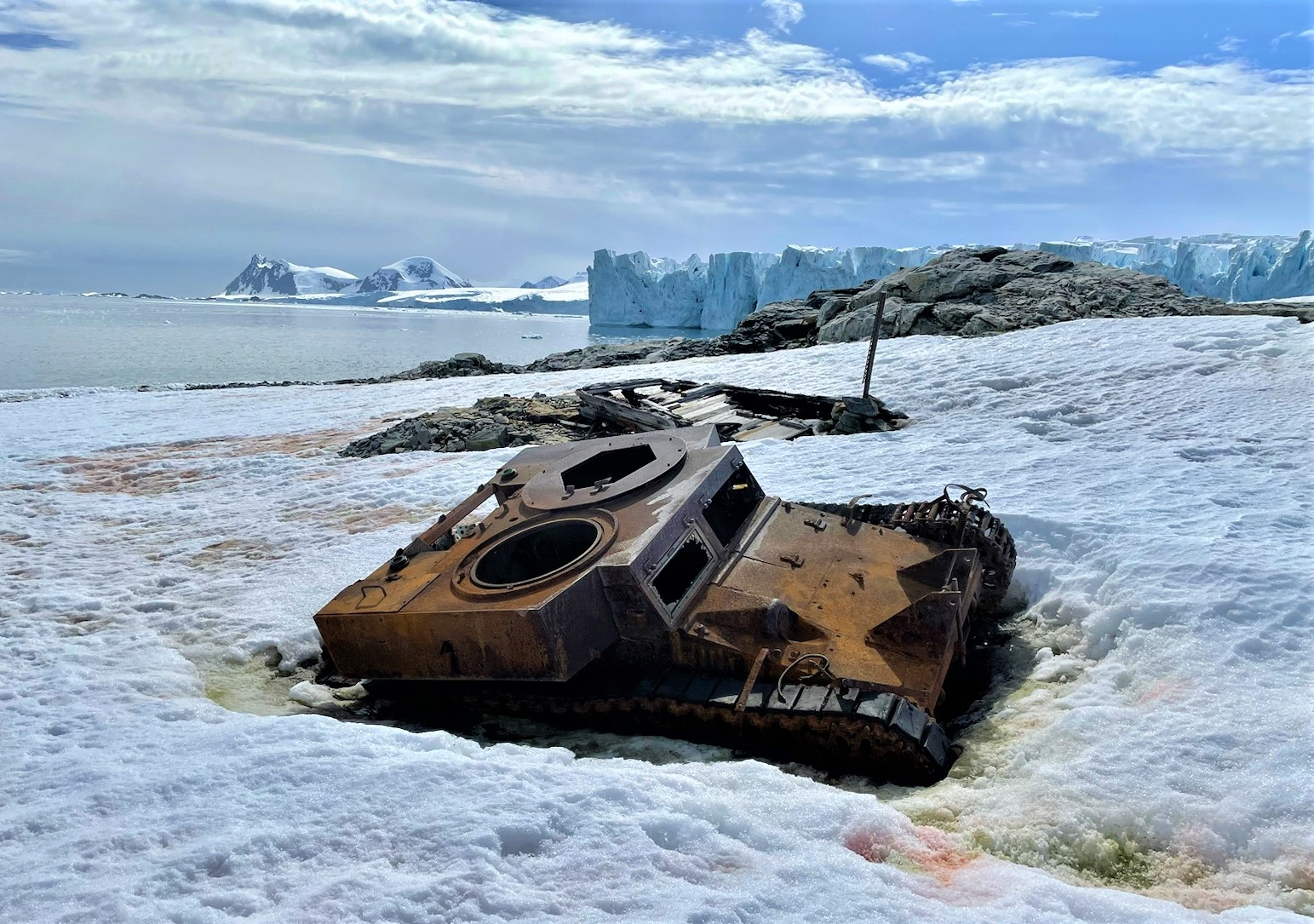
M2A2 light tank from the United States Antarctic Service Expedition

== Expedition members ==
The following is a partial list of expedition members.

- Richard Black, USN - Base Commander (East Base)
- Herwil McClure Bryant - Biologist, Radio Operator (East Base)
- Rear Admiral Richard E. Byrd, USN - Expedition Commander
- Arthur J. Carroll, USN - Chief Photographer (East Base)
- Zadik Collier - Aviation Machinist (East Base)
- Richard H. Cruzen - Commanding officer of USS Bear
- Leland S. Curtis - official artist
- Harry Darlington III - General Duty (East Base)
- Herbert Dorsey - Meteorologist (East Base)
- Hendrik Dolleman - Dog Driver (East Base)
- George J. Dufek - Navigator of USS Bear
- J. Glenn Dyer - Cadastral Engineer, Surveying, Map Making (East Base)
- Carl Eklund - Ornithologist (East Base)
- Felix L. Ferranto - Radio operator (US Marine)
- Roy Fitzsimmons, Magnetologist and Geophysicist
- George W. Gibbs, Jr., USN - Officer's Cook 3rd Class (West Base)
- Joseph D. Healy - Dog Driver (East Base)
- Arthur Jamison Hill - Ph M3c (USS Bear)
- Archie Hill - Cook (East Base)
- Donald Hilton - Assistant Surveyor - Dog Driver (East Base)
- Paul Knowles - Geologist (East Base)
- Elmer Lamplugh - Chief Radioman (East Base)
- Lester Lehrke, USN - Boatswain's Mate First Class, Sailmaker (East Base)
- Anthony Morency - Tank and Tractor Driver (East Base)
- Lytton Musselman - Dog Driver, Radioman (East Base)
- Howard Odom - Assistant Radioman (East Base)
- Robert Palmer - Assistant to Meteorologist, Supply Officer (East Base)
- Charles F. Passel
- Earle Perce - Co-pilot, Radioman (East Base)
- William Pullen, USN - Aviation Machinist Mate (East Base)
- Harrison Holt Richardson - Dog Team Driver and Meteorological Observer
- Finn Ronne - Chief of Staff, Transportation Engineer (East Base)
- Charles Sharbonneau - Carpenter (East Base)
- Lewis Sims - Base Doctor (East Base)
- Paul Siple
- Ashley Snow, Jr. - Chief Pilot (East Base)
- Clarence Steele - Tank and Tractor Driver (East Base)
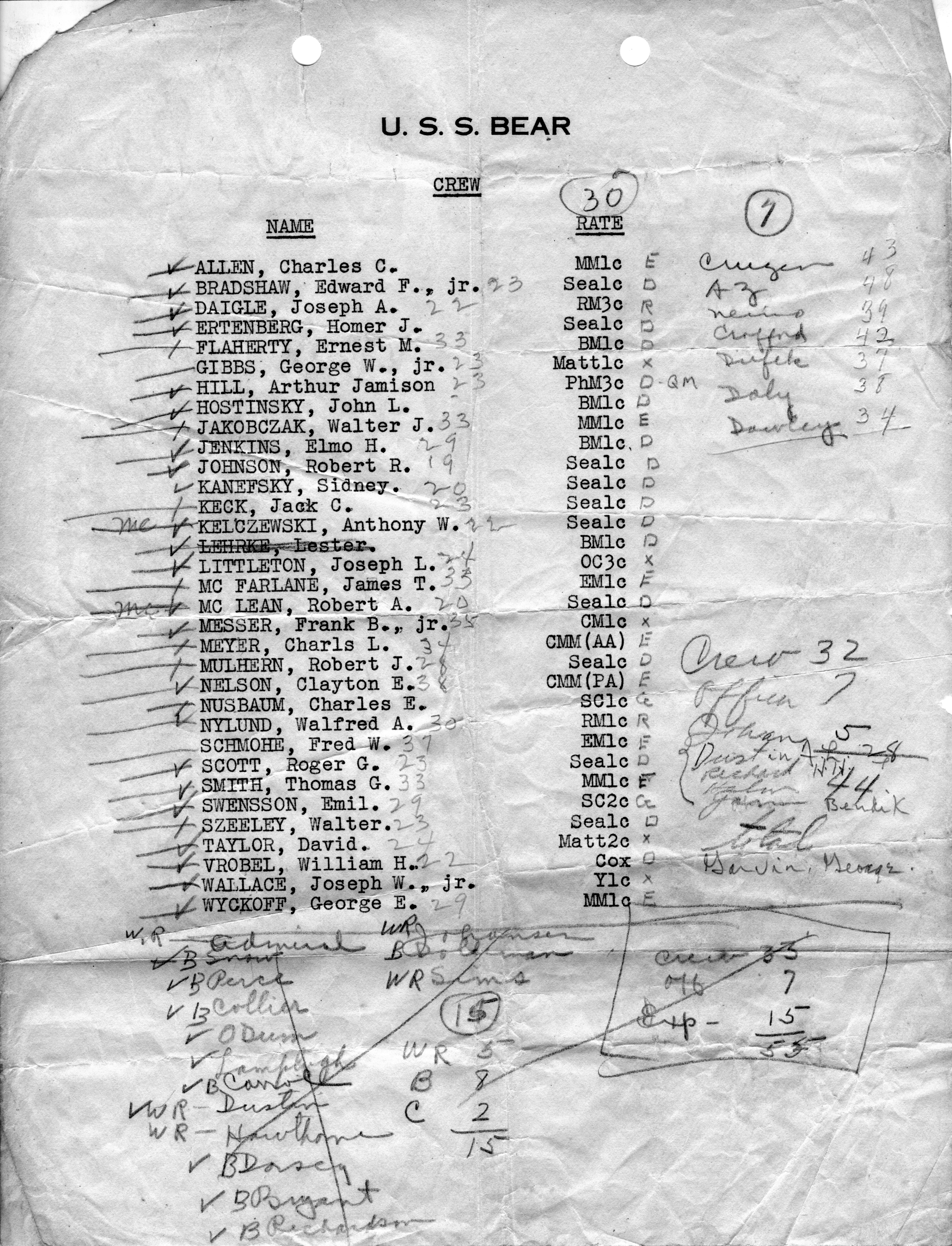
  Crew listing

== See also ==
- United States Antarctic Expedition Medal
- Operation Deep Freeze
- Operation Highjump
- List of Antarctic expeditions
