= Byrd Antarctic Expedition Medal =

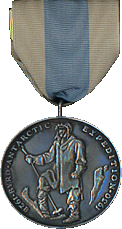
- Obverse
- Type: Military medal Service medal
- Awarded for: Valuable services to the Nation in the field of polar exploration and science
- Presented by: United States Congress
- Eligibility: Members of the first Byrd Antarctic Expedition from 1928-1930
- Status: One Time Award
- Established: 23 May 1930

Highlights
- Total: 81
- Ribbon bar

Precedence
- Next (higher): NC-4 Medal
- Next (lower): Second Byrd Antarctic Expedition Medal
- Related: Peary Polar Expedition Medal; United States Antarctic Expedition Medal

The Byrd Antarctic Expedition Medal is a Congressional medal established by an Act of Congress in 1930 to commemorate the Byrd Antarctic Expedition of 1928–1930. Presented in gold, silver and bronze, the medals were awarded to 81 individuals associated with the expedition, for a total cost of $6,560.

== Appearance ==
The medal is circular in shape and made of gold, silver, or bronze. The obverse depicts a relief of Admiral Byrd in fur lined arctic clothing. Around the depiction is the embossed wording: BYRD ANTARCTIC EXPEDITION 1928-1930. The reverse bears a relief depicting the sailing ship City of New York surrounded by the text PRESENTED TO THE OFFICERS AND MEN OF THE BYRD ANTARCTIC EXPEDITION TO EXPRESS THE HIGH ADMIRATION IN WHICH THE CONGRESS AND THE AMERICAN PEOPLE HOLD THEIR HEROIC AND UNDAUNTED SERVICES IN CONNECTION WITH THE SCIENTIFIC INVESTIGATION EXPLORATION OF THE ANTARCTIC CONTINENT. The medal is borne by a white silk ribbon with light blue center stripe.

Of the 81 men who received the medal, 65 received gold medals, 7 received silver medals, and 9 received bronze medals.

After Byrd's 1934 to 1935 Antarctic Expedition, the Second Byrd Antarctic Expedition Medal was awarded to the expedition's participants.

== Noteworthy recipients ==
Note - the military ranks indicated are the highest the individuals achieved in their careers and not those held at the time of the expedition.

- Rear Admiral Richard E. Byrd, USN - expedition commander
- Colonel Bernt Balchen, USAF - chief pilot
- Lieutenant Colonel Kennard F. Bubier, USMC - mechanic
- Commander Jack Bursey, USCG - seaman and dog sled driver
- Chief Warrant Officer Victor H. Czegka, USMC - machinist and two time Navy Cross recipient
- Frank T. Davies - Canadian physicist
- Dr. Lawrence Gould - geologist and second in command
- Lieutenant Harold June, USN - pilot and radio operator
- Colonel Ashley Chadbourne McKinley, USAF - photographer and aerial surveyor
- Arthur Treadwell Walden - dog team head and dog breeder
- Paul Siple, Ph.D. - a 20-year-old Boy Scout at the time of the expedition
- George W. Tennant - cook
