= Herbert C. Rodd =

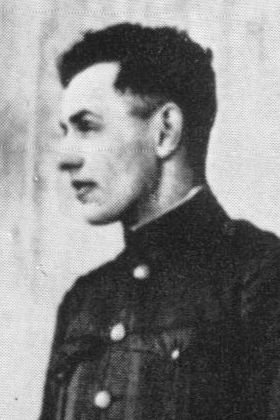
- Ensign Herbert Rodd in 1919
- Born: 4 September 1894; Cleveland, Ohio, U.S.
- Died: 15 June 1932 (aged 37); Hampton Roads, Virginia, U.S.
- Burial place: Arlington National Cemetery, Arlington, Virginia
- Military career
- Allegiance: USA
- Branch: United States Navy
- Service years: 1917–1932
- Rank: Lieutenant commander
- Awards: Navy Cross

Herbert Charles Rodd (4 September 1894 – 15 June 1932) was an American naval aviator. He served as the radio officer on the first successful transatlantic flight by the Curtiss NC-4 in May 1919 and later helped set additional world seaplane records for flight payload, duration and speed.

Rodd was born in Cleveland, Ohio, on 4 September 1894. He joined the United States Navy on 9 April 1917 as an enlisted seaman but was granted a provisional ensign's commission on 20 August 1918.

After World War I, the U.S. Navy planned a transatlantic crossing by a division of four Curtiss NC flying boats. Rodd helped to develop the radio compass for these aircraft. Three flying boats began the journey on 8 May 1919, but only the NC-4 completed the trip successfully. In the aftermath, he was made a knight of the Order of the Tower and Sword by the Portuguese government on 2 June 1919. As a member of the NC-4 crew, he was awarded the Navy Cross and later received a Congressional Gold Medal in 1929.

In 1925, Connell was the pilot on Commander John Rodgers's 1925 attempt to fly from California to Hawaii in a Naval Aircraft Factory PN-9 flying boat.

On 15–16 August 1927, Lieutenants Rodd and Byron James Connell (12 August 1894 – 30 January 1972) flew a Naval Aircraft Factory PN-10 flying boat for 20 hours 45 minutes 40 seconds on a 25-kilometer (15.5-mile) triangular course until their fuel tanks ran dry. Their flight with Aviation Machinist's Mate Comar Vincent and a cargo of 500 kg (1,102 lb) of sand covered 2,525.3 km (1,569.1 mi). The 1927 flight by Rodd and Connell set a new world record for average speed over a 2,000-kilometer (1,242.7-mile) distance by a seaplane of 126.56 km/h (78.64 mph).

Lieutenant Commander Rodd died in the crash of a Vought O2U Corsair floatplane near Hampton Roads, Virginia, on 15 June 1932. He was buried in Arlington National Cemetery.

== Legacy ==
The former Naval Auxiliary Air Station (NAAS) Rodd Field near Corpus Christi, Texas, was named in honor of Rodd. It operated from 7 June 1941 through the late 1950s. Texas State Highway 357 in Corpus Christi still is named Rodd Field Road.
