= NC-4 Medal =

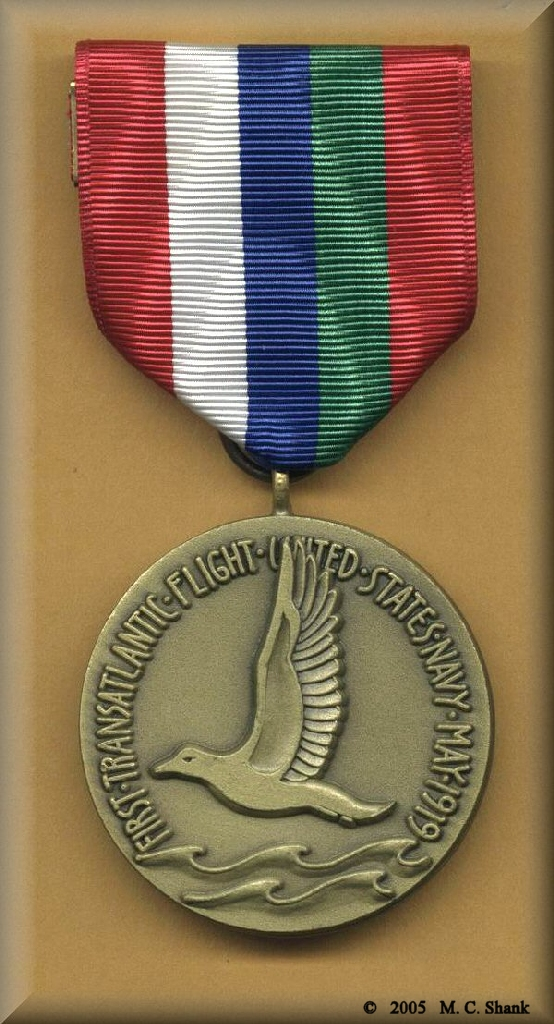
- Obverse
- Type: Military medal
- Awarded for: Extraordinary achievement in making the first successful transatlantic flight
- Description: One Time Award
- Presented by: the President of the United States in the Name of the 70th United States Congress
- Eligibility: Members of the crew of NC-4
- Established: February 9, 1929

Highlights
- Total: 7

Precedence
- Next (higher): Peary Polar Expedition Medal
- Next (lower): Byrd Antarctic Expedition Medal

The NC-4 Medal is a military decoration that was authorized by the United States Congress in 1929 to commemorate the 1919 trans-Atlantic crossing by the members of the NC-4 mission. Originally awarded as a non-wearable table medal, in 1935 a wearable version of the medal was subsequently authorized. A commemorative medal, the NC-4 Medal was a one-time award, and does not currently appear on U.S. Navy award precedence charts.

== Background ==
In 1919, the United States Navy decided to plan a mission to complete the first trans-Atlantic crossing by aircraft. This mission would demonstrate the capabilities of the Navy Curtis seaplane. The mission began with three identical aircraft, NC-1, NC-3, and NC-4 departing from Naval Air Station Rockaway on May 8, 1919. On May 15 the aircraft arrived at Trepassey, Newfoundland, having made intermediate stops along the way. There they met their "base ship" the USS Aroostook (CM-3), recently converted from minelayer to seaplane tender.

After repairs and refitting, the NC's took off for the Azores on 16 May. During this longest leg of the journey, the planes were guided by a picket of twenty-two U.S. Navy ships spaced approximately 50 miles apart. The ships, brightly illuminated, kept the aircraft on course through the night.

After flying all night, NC-4 was the sole aircraft to arrive in the Azores. After an elapsed flying time of 15 hours, 18 minutes, NC-4 arrived at the town of Horta on Faial Island in the Azores on May 17, 1919. The crew had flown about 1,200 miles (1,920 km). During the flight bad weather had forced the NC-1 and NC-3 to land in the open sea, with the NC-4 being the only aircraft to successfully complete the flight.

== Medal authorization ==
Following the 1928 Congressional Gold Medal awarded to Charles Lindbergh for the first solo trans-Atlantic flight, Representative James Russell Leech of Pennsylvania sought to recognize the NC-4 crew. In 1929, he introduced legislation to honoring the accomplishment of the NC-4 crew, for the first trans-Atlantic flight.

The United States Congress passed Public Law 70-714 on February 9, 1929. This created the legal authorization to award medals to the members of the NC-4 crew. The law read:

Be it enacted by the Senate and House of Representatives of the United States of America in Congress assembled, That the President be, and is hereby, authorized to award, in the name of Congress, gold medals of appropriate design to Commander John H. Towers for conceiving, organizing, and commanding the first trans-Atlantic flight; to Lieutenant Commander Albert C. Read, United States Navy, commanding officer NC-4; to Lieutenant Elmer F. Stone, United States Coast Guard, pilot; to former Lieutenant Walter Hinton, United States Navy, pilot; to Lieutenant Herbert C. Rodd, United States Navy, radio operator; to former Lieutenant James L. Breese, United States Naval Reserve Force, engineer; and to former Machinist's Mate Eugene Rhodes, United States Navy, engineer, for their extraordinary achievement in making the first successful trans-Atlantic flight, in the United States naval flying boat NC-4, in May, 1919.

The original medal was presented as a non-wearable, table medal. This medal was presented to Lieutenant Commander Read, and the other five members of the NC-4 crew. A medal was also awarded to Commander Towers, commander of NC-3, which did not complete the flight. While he may have served as NC-3's commander, he was in command of the mission as commander of Seaplane Division One.

=== Wearable medal authorization ===
On April 29, 1935, Congress passed Public Law 74-43 (10 U.S.C. § 6255) which allowed personnel of the U.S. Navy and Marine Corps to wear miniature versions of medals not previously intended for wear. This meant that awards like the NC-4 Medal could now be worn, at the discretion of the Secretary of the Navy, on the military uniform, borne by an appropriate suspension ribbon or worn as a service ribbon in less formal occasions.

== Appearance ==
The obverse of the medal bears the stylized image of a seagull, flying above ocean waves, surrounded by the words FIRST TRANSATLANTIC FLIGHT UNITED STATES NAVY MAY 1919 in relief along the outer edges of the medal. On the reverse, in the center of the medal surrounded by a circle is the inscription NC-4, with NEWFOUNDLAND above it and PORTUGAL below. In the lower half of the medal, in two arcs, is the inscription PRESENTED · BY · THE · PRESIDENT · OF · THE · UNITED · STATES · IN · THE · NAME · OF · CONGRESS. In the corresponding position in the top half of the medal, the names of the recipients: J.H. TOWERS · A.C. READ · E.F. STONE · W. HINTON · H.C. RODD · J.L. BREESE · E. RHODES.

It is very rare that a Congressional Gold Medal be made for wear on clothing.

The NC-4 Medal appeared in older U.S. Navy precedence charts after the Peary Polar Expedition Medal and before the Byrd Antarctic Expedition Medal. The awardee who later was appointed to Vice Admiral, John Towers, was photographed several times as Rear Admiral and Vice Admiral wearing the NC-4 Medal and ribbon ahead of all his other awards. Following the various retirements, deaths, and release from military service of the original recipients, the NC-4 Medal became obsolete and does not appear on any current military award precedence charts.

== Recipients ==
The original NC-4 Medal was presented by President Herbert Hoover in May, 1930. The recipients were:

- Commander John H. Towers, USN
- Lieutenant Commander Albert C. Read, USN
- Lieutenant Elmer F. Stone, USCG
- Lieutenant Walter Hinton, USN
- Ensign Herbert C. Rodd, USN
- Lieutenant James L. Breese Jr., USNR
- Chief Machinist's Mate Eugene S. Rhoads, USN

The last name of Eugene Rhoads was misspelled as Rhodes on both the award citation and the medal.

== See also ==
- Transatlantic flight of Alcock and Brown, June 1919, first non-stop crossing
- List of Congressional Gold Medal recipients
