= George W. Tennant =

Byrd Antarctic Expedition participant

George Woolsey Tennant (born March 7, 1882, Manistee, Michigan; died February 15, 1953, Manistee, Mich.) served as chief steward in the Byrd Antarctic Expedition. In 1928, on the first stage of the expedition, he served in the galley on expedition vessel City of New York. Then, with other expedition members, he overwintered as the cook at Little America. In 1931, he was one of 81 recipients of the Byrd Antarctic Expedition Medal.

Tennant Peak, in the Rockefeller Mountains, was discovered on January 26, 1929. Expedition commander Richard E. Byrd named the peak after George Tennant.
