= Kennard F. Bubier =

American Marine (1902–1983)

Kennard F. Bubier (October 11, 1902 - July 2, 1983) was a Gunnery Sergeant of the U.S. Marine Corps and an aviation mechanic known for being member of the 1928–1930 Byrd Antarctic Expedition.

Bubier was born in Providence, Rhode Island. At retirement from the US Marine Corps he held the rank of lieutenant colonel. Bubier worked for Lockheed Martin for 11 years following his military service. He died in 1983 in California.

== Recognition ==
He was awarded the Navy Cross on October 25, 1930, for his service during the Byrd Antarctic Expedition. In 1930 Bubier, along with 80 others, received a Congressional medal titled the Byrd Antarctic Expedition Medal, for their parts in the expedition. Mount Bubier, on Thurston Island, Antarctica, was named after him. Bubier appeared in the 1930 film With Byrd at the South Pole.
