= Victor H. Czegka =

United States Marine Corps warrant officer

Victor Hugo Czegka
- Born: May 21, 1880; Austria-Hungary
- Died: February 18, 1973 (aged 92) Ipswich, Massachusetts
- Buried: Mount Auburn Cemetery
- Allegiance: United States of America
- Branch: United States Marine Corps
- Service years: 1909~1942
- Rank: Chief Marine Gunner
- Awards: Navy Cross (2)

Victor Hugo Czegka (May 21, 1880 – February 18, 1973) was a highly decorated United States Marine Corps warrant officer. He was awarded two Navy Crosses, the United States military's second-highest award, for his participation in the Byrd Antarctic expeditions.

== Early life and service ==
Victor H. Czegka was born on May 21, 1880, in Austria-Hungary. Czegka immigrated to the United States in 1904 and eventually joined the Marine Corps from Clifton, New Jersey.

In 1909, then First Sergeant Czegka became the first Marine to win the Wimbledon Cup, a marksmanship trophy. He won the trophy using a telescopic sight he had built himself. Czegka became a naturalized American citizen in the state of Pennsylvania in 1916.

== Byrd Antarctic Expeditions ==
=== First expedition ===
From 1928 to 1930, then Master Technical Sergeant Czegka was a member of the first Byrd Antarctic Expeditionary Team. Admiral Richard E. Byrd led Czegka and other explorers to Antarctica, setting up a camp on the Ross Ice Shelf called "Little America." The explorers collected mineral deposits and mapped out over 150,000 square miles of uncharted territory in harsh conditions.

Byrd personally requested Czegka to design and develop an insulated house to use during the expedition. Czegka was the chief machinist and also constructed stoves and snowmobiles. He prepared and modified the scientific instruments that were used, contributing greatly to the success of the expedition. Czegka was awarded his first Navy Cross for his role in the expedition. In 1930 Czegka, along with 80 others, received a Congressional medal titled the Byrd Antarctic Expedition Medal, for their parts in the expedition. Czegka appeared in a documentary about the expedition which was released in 1930, titled With Byrd at the South Pole.

=== Second expedition ===
Master Technical Sergeant Czegka would be awarded a second Navy Cross for contributing to the success of the second Byrd Antarctic Expedition. He was the general manager and supply officer from 1933 to 1935 during the expedition. In December 1934, during the second expedition, a 7,450 foot tall mountain was discovered by Quin Blackburn's geological party. The mountain, part of the Queen Maud Mountains, is located just north of the terminus of Van Reeth Glacier, on the east side of Scott Glacier. Admiral Byrd named the mountain Mount Czegka.

== Later life ==
Czegka retired from the Marine Corps as a chief marine gunner on February 1, 1942, after a total of 30 years of service. Czegka was awarded over 20 military decorations in addition to the Navy Cross. Victor H. Czegka died on February 18, 1973, at his home in Ipswich, Massachusetts. He was buried in Mount Auburn Cemetery in Cambridge, Massachusetts.

=== Navy Cross citation (first award) ===

The President of the United States of America takes pleasure in presenting the Navy Cross to Master Technical Sergeant Victor Hugo Czegka (MCSN: 37980), United States Marine Corps, for distinguished service in the line of his profession as machinist of the Byrd Antarctic Expedition I (1928 - 1930). Through the exceptional skill, zeal and energy of Master Technical Sergeant Czegka in preparatory work, in preparing and modifying scientific instruments, in constructing stoves, snowmobile and in other tasks, he contributed to the success of the expedition.

=== Navy Cross citation (second award) ===

The President of the United States of America takes pleasure in presenting a Gold Star in lieu of a Second Award of the Navy Cross to Master Technical Sergeant Victor Hugo Czegka (MCSN: 37980), United States Marine Corps, for distinguished service in the line of his profession as General Manager and Supply Officer for the Byrd Antarctic Expedition II (1933 - 1935). Sergeant Czegka's conscientious, loyal and indefatigable performance of duty contributed greatly to the success of the Expedition.
