= Harold June =

American aviator

Harold Irving June
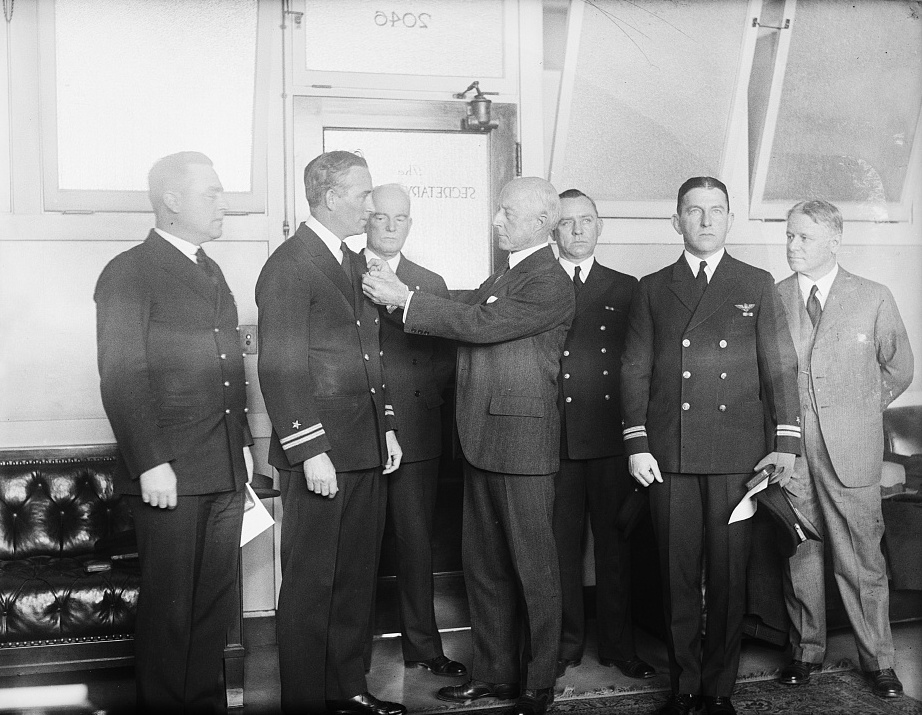
- Harold June (far left) being awarded the Distinguished Flying Cross in 1930
- Born: February 12, 1895; Stamford, Connecticut, U.S.
- Died: 1962 (aged 66–67); Windsor, Connecticut, U.S.
- Known for: Test pilot; Polar aviation

Harold Irving June (1895–1962) was a machinist, an aviator, a test pilot, and an explorer in Antarctica. He is best known for his 1928–1930 service in the first Antarctic expedition of Admiral Richard E. Byrd. Sitting in the co-pilot's seat with supplemental radio duties, he flew with Byrd, pilot Bernt Balchen, and photographer Ashley McKinley over the South Pole on November 29, 1929.

== Biography ==
=== Early life ===
Born in Stamford, Connecticut on February 12, 1895, he studied in the one-room schools of the day. Leaving Stamford High School after one year, he apprenticed in a machine shop in 1908. After working as a repairman, salesman, and traveling repairman for his apprenticeship works, he signed in 1911, at age 16, to a berth as a steam engine engineer on a ferryboat that served Prudence Island in Narrangansett Bay. This, in turn, gave him the credentials to be hired in 1911-1912 as a full-fledged machinist at Herreshoff Boatyard in Bristol, Rhode Island.

This credential, in turn, gave the teenager connections to Newport, Rhode Island's Vanderbilt family and in 1912 young June became an engineer for the steam pleasure yachts of railroad magnate and yachtsman Harold S. Vanderbilt.

=== World War I ===
With the entry of the United States into World War I in 1917, both Vanderbilt and June joined the U.S. Navy, with June serving as a Chief Machinist's Mate and taking on duties of increasing responsibility throughout the Navy's Rhode Island infrastructure.

In October 1917, June was transferred with Vanderbilt to the Block Island, Rhode Island submarine chaser station and was placed in charge of repairs. June organized a force of 100 men and built complete machine shops, a pumping station, and a system of docks. June also oversaw the raising of two ships sunk in Block Island harbor.

In May 1918 June transferred to the Herreshoff yard in Bristol, Rhode Island as senior inspector in charge of repairs and new work for vessels built for the U.S. Navy.

=== Post war ===
After the war's end, June left the Navy in 1919 and worked for Harold Vanderbilt as his chief engineer. He re-enlisted in the Navy in 1920 and served as an instructor of aviation mechanics. In 1922 he transferred to the Naval Air Station Pensacola and took a 12-week course which qualified him as an aircraft radio operator. In 1923 he volunteered for pilot training and graduated first in his class of 38 out of 60 who had started the course.

After earning his pilot wings June received the rating of Chief Aviation Pilot when the rate was established in 1924. (Prior to 1947, Navy enlisted men were eligible for training as pilots. The Navy's last enlisted pilot retired in 1981.) June developed quickly through the opportunities afforded by the technology of the time by piloting flying boats and scout planes launched from catapults.

June became a U.S. Navy test pilot in 1925, and served out of Hampton Roads until selected, in 1928, by Commander Richard E. Byrd to be a pilot on his 1928-1930 expedition to the Ross Ice Shelf. June was one of the few enlisted pilots of that era.

=== Byrd Antarctic Expedition ===
Byrd's exploration ship reached the ice shelf on December 25, 1928. The base camp, called Little America, was in operation within weeks, and the first ski-plane flight took off on January 10, 1929. The expedition, well-equipped with supplies purchased from donations from some of the principal U.S. magnates of the Roaring Twenties, was eager to explore the above-sea-level sectors of Antarctica that bordered the ice shelf. The Rockefeller Mountains were sighted from the air on January 27. On March 8 June, Balchen, and geologist Larry Gould, aboard the expedition's Fokker Universal, flew from Little America to land as close as possible to the Rockefeller range to collect geological specimens.

==== Rescue ====
Balchen, Gould, and June were supposed to collect specimens from the newly discovered icy mountain range and return to base, but their plane did not return and the missing field party maintained an ominous radio silence. After ten days, expedition leader Byrd flew a rescue mission in search of the lost threesome. On March 18 the three men were found clinging to life inside a shredded tent pitched at the foot of the mountain range. They had inadvertently landed in a site marked by exceptionally strong katabatic winds that vortexed down from the mountains. After the field party had spiked their plane down into the ice, set up a field meteorological station, pitched a field tent, did some triangulation survey work, and collected some rocks, hurricane-force winds had blown down the slope at a speed timed at 150 miles per hour. The Category 4 winds wrenched the Fokker off its moorings and the steel plane blew away, leaving the field party marooned.

A series of rescue flights with a smaller plane, beginning on March 18 and ending on March 22, slowly collected all three men and returned them safely to Little America. The shattered remains of the missing Fokker monoplane were discovered one-half mile (0.8 km) away from the failed ground mooring.

==== South Pole mission and other flights ====
With two remaining planes, the Byrd Expedition remained in base camp at Little America during the Antarctic winter of 1929. Field work resumed in October and after several preparatory flights, the Ford Tri-Motor, named the Floyd Bennett in honor of the pilot of the first plane to fly over the North Pole in 1926, scheduled to fly over the South Pole took off southward on November 28. While this was to be the first penetration by an aircraft over the Antarctic Plateau, the route itself was generally familiar to Byrd and his men, because they flew close to the pathway used by Roald Amundsen in his successful ground-level expedition to the South Pole in late 1911.

Those on board the Floyd Bennett for the historic flight were Commander Richard E. Byrd serving as commander and navigator, Bernt Balchen as primary pilot, Ashley Chadbourne McKinley as photographer and June as co-pilot and radio operator. With difficulty, the Tri-Motor cleared the Queen Maud Mountains and attained the Pole. Aboard the plane, June keyed a radio signal:

We have reached the vicinity of the South Pole. We can see an almost unlimited polar plateau.

Relayed to the American press, this Morse code message announced the successful attainment of the expedition's principal goal.

After the Tri-Motor's triumphant landing later on November 29, June accompanied Byrd as co-pilot on additional exploration flying work across an adjacent area of Antarctica. Byrd, as the flight crew's commanding officer and principal passenger, sketched the land from the air and named it Marie Byrd Land after his wife. The flights charted the Edsel Ford Range and Sulzberger Bay, geographic features named for additional key financial donors to the expedition.

As the Antarctic winter approached, the expedition closed their Little America base and their ship sailed north from the Ross Ice Shelf on February 7, 1930. They arrived in New York City on June 18–19.

Shortly after he return to the United States, June was honored by the community where he had been born. A reception, luncheon, and dinner of honor were given in his honor by leading citizens of Stamford on June 26, 1930. He also received from the town a gold medal and an inscribed silver service.

On November 29, 1930, exactly one year after his historic flight over the South Pole, June was decorated with the Distinguished Flying Cross by Secretary of the Navy Charles F. Adams.

=== Second Byrd Expedition ===
June was selected to serve as chief pilot on Admiral Byrd's second Antarctic expedition from 1933 to 1935. June's contributions to the expedition were invaluable.

June, along with Admiral Byrd, departed Bayonne, New Jersey for Antarctica on October 13, 1933 on board the ship Jacob Ruppert.

From September 27 to October 20, 1934 June led four men on an exploration mission in a snow tractor which discovered a large plateau in the Edsel Ford Range with an elevation of 2,160 feet.

Early in November he flew missions to help an exploration party with a snow tractor find a way back to base when they became surrounded by ice crevasses. On November 22 he piloted the biplane William Horlick on a long range reconnaissance mission into the unexplored area to the southeast of Little America which covered 1,150 miles. In early December he piloted an emergency mission to land fuel supplies to replenish two of the expedition's snow tractors which had run low on fuel.

June stopped in New Zealand on his return to the United States in April 1935 and reported that the 2nd Byrd Expedition had surveyed more of Antarctica than any expedition since the Scott expeditions.

=== Later career ===
After returning to the United States, June served as a test pilot with the U.S. Navy, and continued to serve through World War II. In 1941 he was stationed at the Naval Air Station in Pensacola, Florida. He was promoted to the warrant officer rank of machinist on 21 March 1942 and was commissioned as a lieutenant on 4 May 1943. After the war, he was the chief test pilot at Naval Air Station Alameda.

=== Retirement and death ===
Lieutenant Harold I. June retired from the Navy in 1947 after 30 years of service. He lived the rest of his life in his home state of Connecticut and died in Windsor, Connecticut in 1962.

== Family ==
June had married May Foster in June 1914, and fathered a daughter, Marguarite June, born in 1915. June and his wife divorced in March 1938.

== Legacy ==
The Ford Trimotor plane co-piloted by June over the South Pole, named the Floyd Bennett after the pilot of Byrd's North Pole flight in 1926, was returned to its donors, the Ford Motor Company, and preserved at the Henry Ford Museum in Dearborn, Michigan. June's polar papers were donated, with the Byrd archive, to Ohio State University.

The June Nunatak, an Antarctic rocky outcropping of the Liv Glacier, was named in honor of co-pilot June in 1961-62, three decades after the successful flight by the Floyd Bennett up and over the same glacier in 1929.

== Awards ==

Naval Aviator Badge (1923)
1st Row	Distinguished Flying Cross (1930)		Navy Good Conduct Medal with silver star (1924)
2nd Row	Byrd Antarctic Expedition Medal issued in Gold (1930)	Second Byrd Antarctic; Expedition Medal (1936)	World War I Victory Medal (1919)
3rd Row	American Defense Service Medal (1940)	American Campaign Medal (1942)	World War II Victory Medal (1945)
