= Curtiss NC-4 =

United States Navy flying boat, First aircraft to cross the Atlantic Ocean

NC-4
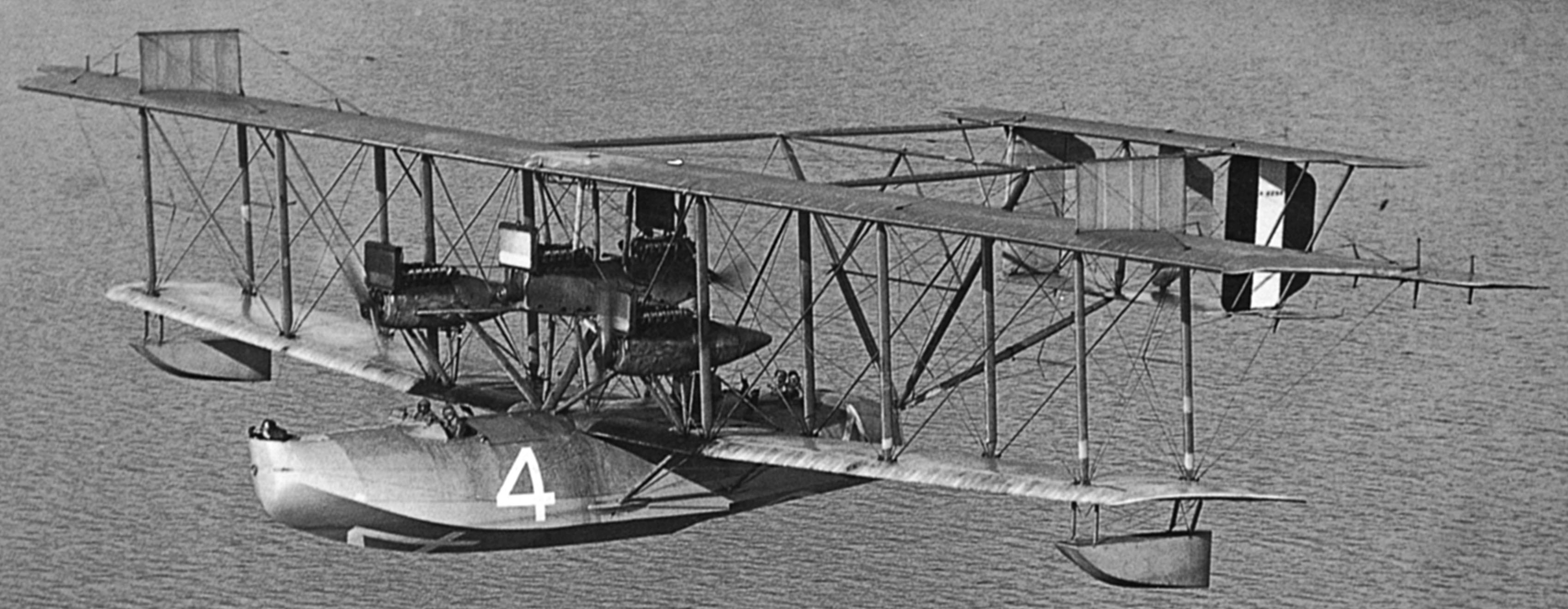
- The NC-4 after her return to the United States in 1919

General information
- Type: Curtiss NC
- Manufacturer: Curtiss Aeroplane and Motor Company
- Owners: U.S. Navy
- Serial: A2294

History
- Manufactured: 1917
- First flight: 30 April 1919
- In service: 1919–1920
- Preserved at: National Naval Aviation Museum, Pensacola, Florida

The NC-4 is a Curtiss NC flying boat that was the first aircraft to fly across the Atlantic Ocean, albeit not non-stop. The NC designation was derived from the collaborative efforts of the Navy (N) and Curtiss (C). The NC series flying boats were designed to meet wartime needs, and after the end of World War I they were sent overseas to validate the design concept.

The aircraft was designed by Glenn Curtiss and his team, and manufactured by Curtiss Aeroplane and Motor Company, with the hull built by the Herreshoff Manufacturing Corporation in Bristol, Rhode Island.

In May 1919, a crew of United States Navy and US Coast Guard aviators flew the NC-4 from New York State to Lisbon, Portugal, over the course of 19 days. This included time for stops for numerous repairs and crewmen's rest, with stops along the way in Massachusetts, Nova Scotia (on the mainland), Newfoundland, and twice in the Azores Islands. Then its flight from the Azores to Lisbon completed the first transatlantic flight between North America and Europe, and two more flights from Lisbon to northwestern Spain to Plymouth, England, completed the first flight between North America and Great Britain. This accomplishment was somewhat eclipsed in the minds of the public by the first nonstop transatlantic flight, made by the Royal Air Force pilots John Alcock and Arthur Whitten Brown two weeks later. (Note: Alcock and Brown's flight was between Newfoundland and Ireland—both of which are islands—whereas the NC-4 flew from Long Island (also an island) via Massachusetts (on the mainland), Nova Scotia, Newfoundland, and the Azores to the mainland of Europe, in Lisbon, Portugal, assisted in navigation by 21 U.S. Navy warships spaced on the average about 57 nautical miles (106 km) apart along the route over the open Atlantic Ocean.)

== Background ==
The transatlantic capability of the NC-4 was the result of developments in aviation that began before World War I. In 1908, Glenn Curtiss had experimented unsuccessfully with floats on the airframe of an early June Bug craft, but his first successful takeoff from water was not carried out until 1911, with an A-1 airplane fitted with a central pontoon. In January 1912, he first flew his first hulled "hydro-aeroplane", which led to an introduction with the retired English naval officer John Cyril Porte who was looking for a partner to produce an aircraft with him to attempt win the prize of the newspaper the Daily Mail for the first transatlantic flight between the British Isles and any point in the United States of America, Canada, or Newfoundland—not necessarily nonstop, but using just one airplane. (e.g. changing airplanes in Iceland or the Azores was not allowed.)

Emmitt Clayton Bedell, a chief designer for Curtiss, improved the hull by incorporating the Bedell Step, the innovative hydroplane "step" in the hull allowed for breaking clear of the water at takeoff. Porte and Curtiss were joined by Lt. John H. Towers of the U.S. Navy as a test pilot. The 1914 America flying boat produced by Porte and Curtiss was a larger aircraft with two engines and two pusher propellers. The members of the team hoped to claim the prize for a transatlantic flight, however their ambitions were curtailed on 4 August 1914 with the outbreak of World War I in Europe.

Development continued in the U.S. and Porte now back in the Royal Navy's flight arm the RNAS, commissioned more flying boats to be built by the Curtiss Company. These could be used for long-range antisubmarine warfare patrols. Porte modified these aircraft, and he developed them into his own set of Felixstowe flying boats with more powerful engines, longer ranges, better hulls and better handling characteristics. He shared this design with the Curtiss Company, which built these improved models under license, selling them to the U.S. Government.

This led in a set of four similar aircraft, the NC-1, NC-2, NC-3 and the NC-4, the U.S. Navy's first series of four huge Curtiss NC flying boats made for the Navy by the Curtiss Aeroplane and Motor Company. The NC-4 made its first test flight on 30 April 1919.

World War I had ended in November 1918, before the completion of the four Curtiss NCs. Then in 1919, with several of the new floatplanes in its possession, the officers in charge of the U.S. Navy decided to demonstrate the capability of the seaplanes with a transatlantic flight. However it was necessary to schedule refueling and repair stops that were also for crewmen's meals and sleep and rest breaks—since these Curtiss NCs were quite slow in flight. For example, the flight between Newfoundland and the Azores required many hours of night flight because it could not be completed in one day.

== Transatlantic flight ==
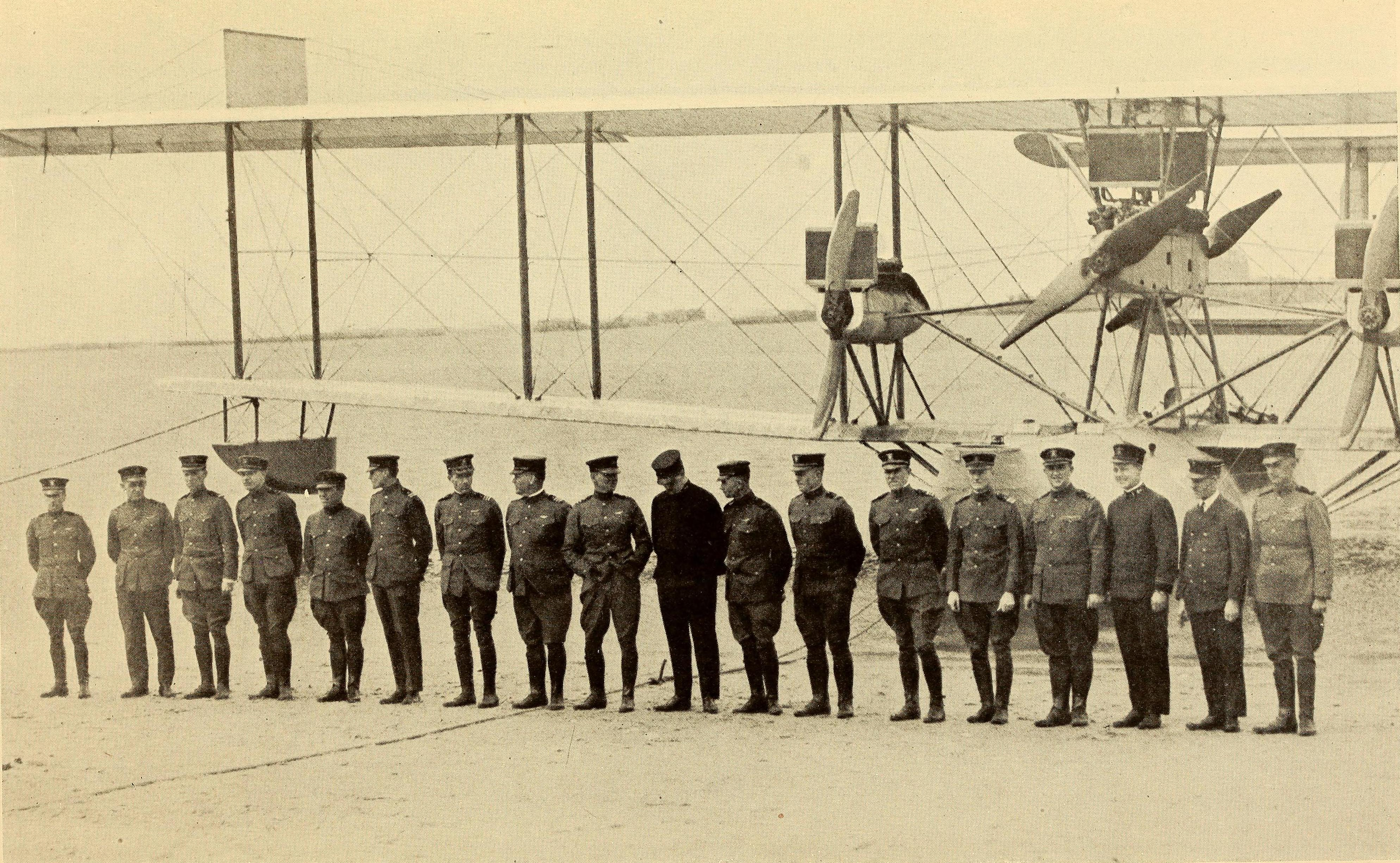
Crews of the NC-4, NC-3 and NC-1 immediately before the departure of the first transatlantic flight

The U.S. Navy's transatlantic flight expedition began on 8 May 1919. The NC-4 started out in the company of two other Curtiss NCs, the NC-1 and the NC-3 (with the NC-2 having been cannibalized for spare parts to repair the NC-1 before this group of planes had even left New York City). The three aircraft left from Naval Air Station Rockaway, (Note: The Rockaway Naval Air Station was later abandoned by the Navy and made a part of the Gateway National Recreation Area) with intermediate stops at the Chatham Naval Air Station, Massachusetts, and Halifax, Nova Scotia, before flying on to Trepassey, Newfoundland, on 15 May. Eight U.S. Navy warships were stationed along the northern East Coast of the United States and Atlantic Canada to help the Curtiss NCs in navigation and to rescue their crewmen in case of any emergency.

The "base ship", or the flagship for all of the Navy ships that had been assigned to support the flight of the Curtiss NCs, was the former minelayer USS Aroostook, which the Navy had converted into a seaplane tender just before the flight of the Curtiss NCs. With a displacement of just over 3,000 tons, Aroostook was larger than the Navy's destroyers that had been assigned to support the transatlantic flight in 1919. Before the Curtiss NCs took off from New York City, Aroostook had been sent to Trepassey, Newfoundland, to await their arrival there, and then provide refueling, relubrication, and maintenance work on the NC-1, NC-3 and NC-4. Next, she steamed across the Atlantic meet the group when they arrived in England.

On 16 May, the three Curtiss NCs departed on the longest leg of their journey, from Newfoundland to the Azores Islands in the mid-Atlantic. Twenty-two more Navy ships, mostly destroyers, were stationed at about 50-mile (80 km) spacings along this route. These "station ships" were brightly illuminated during the nighttime. Their sailors blazed their searchlights into the sky, and they also fired bright star shells into the sky to help the aviators to stay on their planned flight path.

After flying all through the night and most of the next day, the NC-4 reached the town of Horta on Faial Island in the Azores on the following afternoon, having flown about 1,200 miles (1,900 km). It had taken the crewmen 15 hours, 18 minutes, to fly this leg. The NCs encountered thick fog banks along the route. Both the NC-1 and the NC-3 were forced to land on the open Atlantic Ocean because the poor visibility and loss of a visual horizon made flying extremely dangerous. NC-1 was damaged landing in the rough seas and could not become airborne again. NC-3 had mechanical problems.

The crewmen of the NC-1, including future Admiral Marc Mitscher, were rescued by the Greek cargo ship SS Ionia. This ship took the NC-1 in tow, but it sank three days later and was lost in deep water.

The pilots of the NC-3, including future Admiral Jack Towers, taxied their floatplane some 200 nautical miles (370 km; 230 mi) to reach the Azores, where it was taken in tow by a U.S. Navy ship.

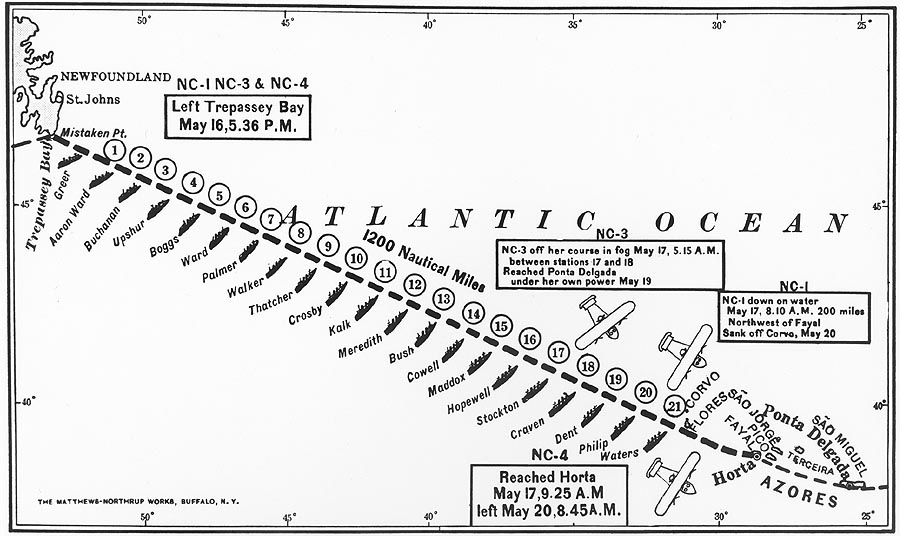
US Navy warships "strung out like a string of pearls" along the NCs' flightpath (3rd leg)

Three days after arriving in the Azores, on 20 May, the NC-4 took off again bound for Lisbon, but it suffered mechanical problems, and its pilots had to land again at Ponta Delgada, São Miguel Island, Azores, having flown only about 150 miles (240 km). After several days of delays for spare parts and repairs, the NC-4 took off again on 27 May. Once again there were station ships of the Navy to help with navigation, especially at night. There were 13 warships arranged along the route between the Azores and Lisbon. The NC-4 had no more serious problems, and it landed in Lisbon harbor after a flight of nine hours, 43 minutes. Thus, the NC-4 became the first aircraft of any kind to fly across the Atlantic Ocean – or any of the other oceans. By flying from Massachusetts and Halifax to Lisbon, the NC-4 also flew from mainland-to-mainland of North America and Europe. Note: the seaplanes were hauled ashore for maintenance work on their engines.

The flight from Newfoundland to Lisbon took a total time of 10 days and 22 hours, with an actual flight time of 26 hours and 46 minutes.

The NC-4 later flew on to England, arriving in Plymouth on 31 May to great fanfare, having taken 23 days for the flight from Newfoundland to Great Britain. For the final flight legs – from Lisbon to Ferrol, Spain, and then from Ferrol to Plymouth – 10 more U.S. Navy warships were stationed along the route. A total of 53 U.S. Navy ships had been stationed along the route from New York City to Plymouth.

Most of the flight route taken by the NC-4 was indicated on the map of the North Atlantic published by Flight magazine on 29 May 1919, while the NC-4 was still on the mainland of Portugal.

The feat of making the first transatlantic flight was somewhat eclipsed shortly afterwards by the first nonstop transatlantic flight by John Alcock and Arthur Whitten Brown in a Vickers Vimy biplane, when they flew from Newfoundland to Ireland nonstop on 14–15 June 1919, in 16 hours and 27 minutes. Consequently, Alcock and Brown won a prize of £10,000 offered by the newspaper, Daily Mail, which had been first announced in 1913, and then renewed in 1918, to "the aviator who shall first cross the Atlantic in an aeroplane in flight from any point in the United States, Canada, or Newfoundland to any point in Great Britain or Ireland, in 72 consecutive hours." The conditions also stipulated that "only one aircraft may be used for each attempt." Hence, there was no possibility of changing to a fresh aircraft in Iceland, Greenland, the Azores, and beyond.

Alcock and Brown also made their flight nonstop, even though this was not specified in the rules given by the Daily Mail. Conceivably, any aviators could have made stops on Iceland, Greenland, or the Azores along the way for refueling, as long as they completed the entire flight within 72 hours. The rule that "only one aircraft may be used" eliminated the possibility of having fresh aircraft, with their fuel tanks already topped off, and new oil in their crankcase(s), waiting for the pilot or pilots to change from one exhausted airplane to a fresh one.

The Curtiss NCs were never entered into the above competition – because the U.S. Navy never planned for their flight to be completed in fewer than 72 hours.

A 1945 newsreel covering various firsts in human flight, including footage of the flight across the Atlantic

== Flight crew ==
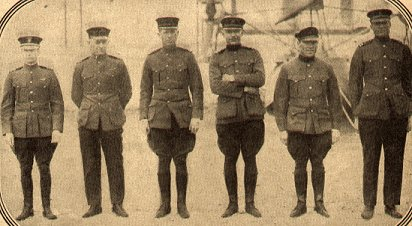
The crew of the NC-4, posing before Howard was replaced. Left to right: Read, Stone, Hinton, Rodd, Howard, Breese.

The crewmen of the NC-4 were Albert Cushing Read, the commander and navigator; Walter Hinton and Elmer Fowler Stone (Coast Guard Aviator #1), the two pilots; James L. Breese and Eugene S. Rhoads, the two flight engineers; and Herbert C. Rodd, the radio operator. Earlier, E.H. Howard had been chosen to go as one of the flight engineers, but on 2 May, Howard lost a hand in misjudging his distance from a whirling propeller. Consequently, he was replaced by Rhoads in the crew.

== After the crossing ==
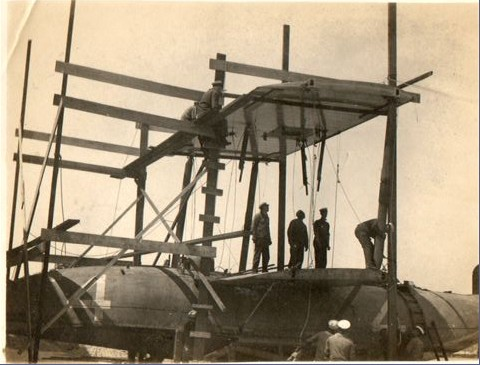
The NC-4 being dismantled in June 1919 at Plymouth, England, before being shipped back to United States

After arriving at Plymouth, England, the crewmen of the NC-4 went by train to London, and there they received a tumultuous welcome. Next, they visited Paris, France, to be lionized again.

The NC-4 was dismantled in Plymouth, and then loaded onto USS Aroostook, the base ship for the Curtiss NC's transatlantic flight, for the return journey to the United States. Aroostook arriving in New York Harbor on 2 July 1919.

Following the return of all three of the aircrews on board the ocean liner USS Zeppelin, a goodwill tour of the East Coast of the United States and the Gulf Coast of the Southern States was carried out by the aircrew.

On 9 February 1929, Congress passed Public Law 70-714 (45 Stat. 1157), awarding Congressional Gold Medals to Lt. Commander John H. Towers for "conceiving, organizing, and commanding the first trans-Atlantic flight", and the six men of the flight crew "for their extraordinary achievement in making the first successful trans-Atlantic flight, in the United States naval flying boat NC-4, in May 1919." The Navy created a military decoration known as the NC-4 Medal.

It is very rare that a Congressional Gold Medal in miniature form be authorized for wear on a naval or military uniform.

The NC-4 is property of the Smithsonian Institution, since it was given to that institution by the Navy after its return home. However, this aircraft was too large to be housed in either the older Smithsonian Arts & Industries Building in Washington, D.C., or in its successor, the 1976-completed National Air and Space Museum main building, also in Washington. A smaller model of the NC-4 is kept in the Milestones of Flight Gallery in the National Air and Space Museum, a place of honor, along with the original Wright Flyer of 1903; Charles Lindbergh's Spirit of St. Louis of 1927; Chuck Yeager's Glamorous Glennis X-1 rocket plane of 1947, and an X-15 rocket aircraft. As of 1974, the reassembled NC-4 is on loan from the Smithsonian to the National Museum of Naval Aviation in Pensacola, Florida.

== Operators ==
United States

- United States Navy

== Specifications (NC-4) ==
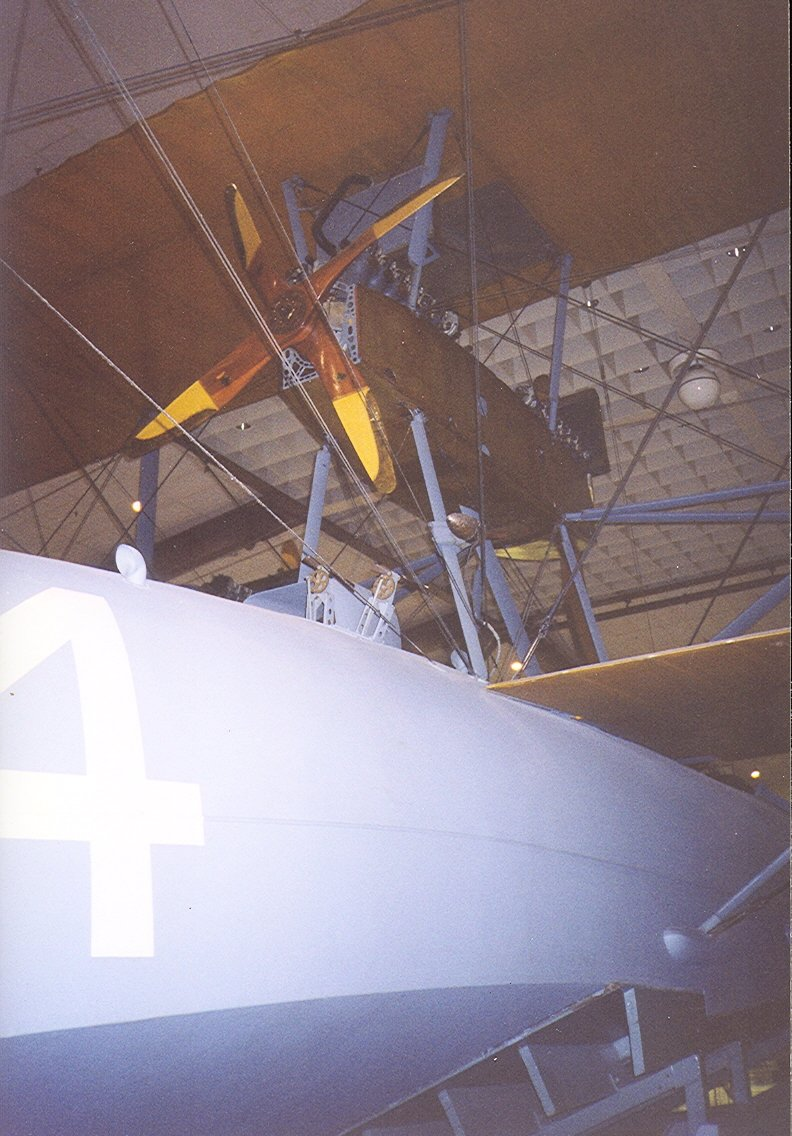
Center nacelle tractor and 4 bladed pusher Liberty V-12 engines, the Herreshoff hull, and one wing of the NC-4 in the National Museum of Naval Aviation, Pensacola, in 1997.

Data from Curtiss Aircraft 1907–1947

General characteristics

- Crew: 5
- Length: 68 ft 2 in (20.78 m)

NC-2: 68 ft 2 in (20.78 m)

- Wingspan: 126 ft (38 m)
- Height: 24 ft 5 in (7.44 m)
- Wing area: 2,441 sq ft (226.8 m^{2})
- Airfoil: RAF 6
- Empty weight: 16,000 lb (7,257 kg)

NC-2: 14,100 lb (6,400 kg)

- Gross weight: 28,000 lb (12,701 kg)

NC-2: 23,000 lb (10,000 kg)

- Powerplant: 4 × Liberty L-12 V-12 water-cooled piston engines, 400 hp (300 kW) each

NC-1: 3x 360 hp (270 kW) low compression Liberty L-12 engines; converted to four Liberty engines
NC-2: 3x 400 hp (300 kW) Liberty L-12 engines; converted to four Liberty engines as the NC-T

- Propellers: 4-bladed fixed-pitch propellers

Performance

- Maximum speed: 85 mph (137 km/h, 74 kn)
- Endurance: 14 hours 48 minutes
- Service ceiling: 2,500 ft (760 m)

NC-2: 2,500 ft (760 m)

- Time to altitude: 2,000 ft (610 m) in 10 minutes
- Power/mass: 0.06 hp/lb (0.099 kW/kg)

Armament

- Machine guns in front and rear cockpits; Provision to carry depth charges in wartime

== Notable appearances in media ==
Frederick Ellsworth Bigelow (1873–1929), famous for the "Our Director March", wrote a march called "The NC4" dedicated to the men of the NC4.

== See also ==
- Charles M. Olmsted
