= Albert Cushing Read =

United States Navy admiral

Albert Cushing Read, Sr.
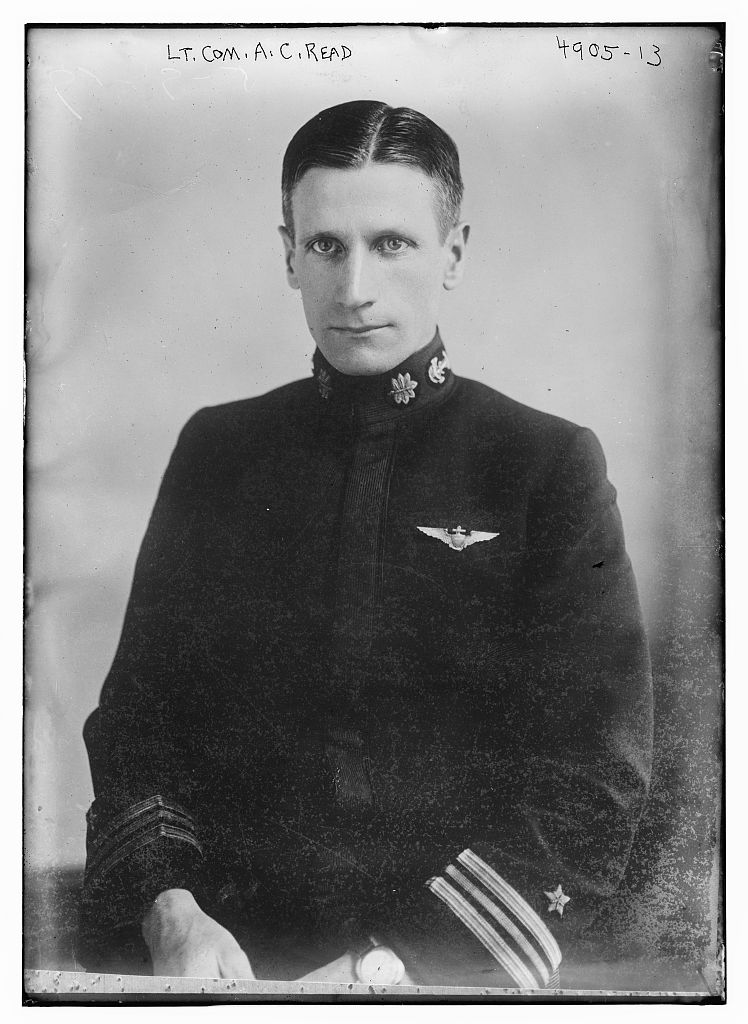
- Read in 1919
- Born: March 29, 1887; Lyme, New Hampshire, US
- Died: October 10, 1967 (aged 80); Coconut Grove, Florida, US
- Burial place: Arlington National Cemetery
- Military career
- Allegiance: United States
- Branch: United States Navy
- Service years: 1907–1946
- Rank: Rear admiral
- Conflicts: World War I World War II
- Awards: Distinguished Service Medal; Legion of Merit; NC-4 Medal

Albert Cushing Read, Sr. (March 29, 1887 – October 10, 1967) was an aviator and rear admiral in the United States Navy. He and his crew made the first transatlantic flight in the NC-4, a Curtiss NC flying boat.

== Early life and Atlantic crossing ==
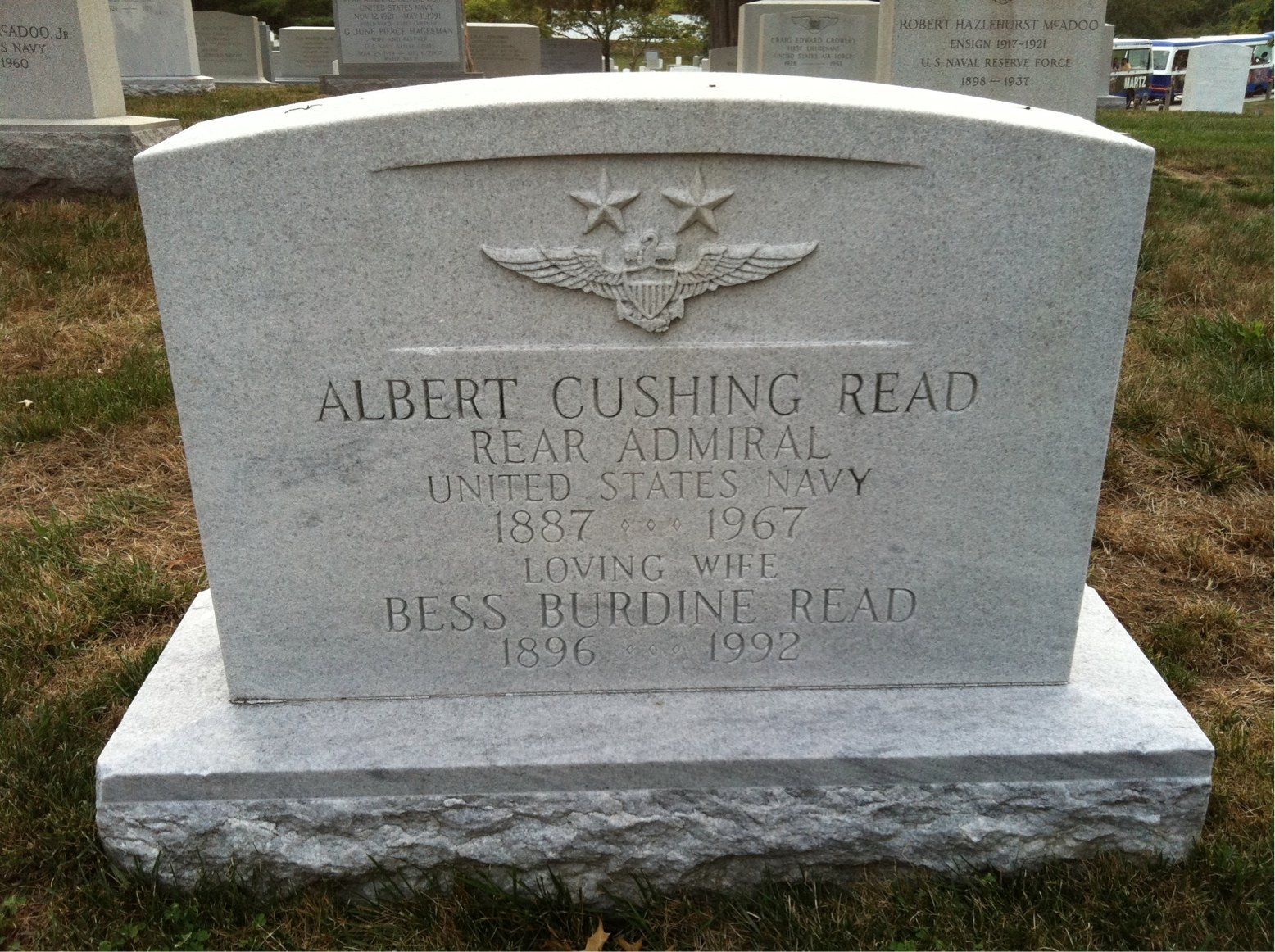
Grave at Arlington National Cemetery

Read was born in Lyme, New Hampshire on March 29, 1887 into a Boston Brahmin family. He attended the United States Naval Academy at Annapolis, graduating in the class of 1907. His Academy classmates included Patrick N. L. Bellinger, Willis W. Bradley, George M. Courts, Henry K. Hewitt, Jonas H. Ingram, Claud A. Jones, and Raymond Spruance. In 1915, he was designated naval aviator number 24.

As a Lieutenant Commander in May 1919, Read commanded a crew of five on the NC-4 Curtiss flying boat, the first aircraft ever to make a transatlantic flight, a couple of weeks before Alcock and Brown's non-stop flight, and eight years before Charles Lindbergh's solo, non-stop flight. Read's flight started from Rockaway Beach, Long Island, took 23 days before arriving in Plymouth, England. The six stops included layovers at Trepassey Bay, Newfoundland, the Azores, and Lisbon, Portugal.

Later in 1919, upon returning to the U.S., Read predicted: "It soon will be possible to drive an airplane around the world at a height of 60,000 feet and 1,000 miles per hour." The next day, The New York Times ran an editorial in reaction, stating: "It is one thing to be a qualified aviator, and quite another to be a qualified prophet. Nothing now known supports the Lieutenant Commander’s forecast. An airplane at the height of 60,000 feet would be whirling its propellers in a vacuum, and no aviator could live long in the freezing cold of interstellar space."

On June 3, 1919, he was made a commander of the Order of the Tower and Sword by the Portuguese government. After returning to the United States, Read was awarded the Navy Distinguished Service Medal, which at the time was a more prestigious award than the Navy Cross that the other five NC-4 crew members received (the order of award precedence was switched in 1942). In 1929, Read and the rest of the flight crew of NC-4 were awarded Congressional Gold Medals.

== Later life ==
On June 24, 1924, Commander Read assumed command of both USS Ajax and the aircraft squadrons of the Asiatic Fleet. He served in this position until Ajax was relieved by USS Jason in June 1925 and subsequently decommissioned in July 1925. From Oct. 1926 to May 1929 Capt. Read resided at the Historic "Connecticut House" on Norfolk Naval Base.

Read trained naval aviators through World War II. He was nicknamed "Putty Read" because his face rarely showed any emotion.

On June 4, 1962, he appeared on the TV game show I've Got a Secret.

He died in retirement in Coconut Grove, Florida, on October 10, 1967. He is buried in Arlington National Cemetery with his wife Bess Burdine Read (1896–1992).

Read was inducted into the National Aviation Hall of Fame in 1965.

== Awards ==
- Congressional Gold Medal
- Navy Distinguished Service Medal
- NC-4 Medal
- World War I Victory Medal
- American Defense Service Medal
- American Campaign Medal
- Commander of the Order of the Tower and Sword
- Air Force Cross (United Kingdom)
- World War II Victory Medal

== See also ==
- John Alcock - British commander of the first non-stop transatlantic flight (1919)
- Theodore G. Ellyson - U.S. Naval Aviator No. 1
- Eugene Burton Ely - First aviator to successfully takeoff and land from a ship
- William A. Moffett - First commander of the U.S. Navy's Bureau of Aeronautics & father of U.S. Naval aviation
- John Cyril Porte - British flying boat pioneer whose transatlantic flight attempt was cancelled due to WWI
- John Rodgers - U.S. Naval Aviator No. 2, commander of first flight to Hawaii (1925)
- John Henry Towers - U.S. Naval Aviator No. 3

== Bibliography ==
- Cunningham, Charlie and Jackie. Putty and Bess. Alexandria, VA: Association of Naval Aviation, 1997.
- Albert C. Read and the NC-4 on early aviators site
- Commander Albert C. Read is congratulated by Secretary of the Navy Josephus Daniels and Assistant Secretary of the Navy Franklin Delano Roosevelt (standing on right) on June 30, 1919
