= Harrison Holt Richardson =

- Born: June 16, 1919; Beaver, Pennsylvania, US
- Died: July 17, 1999 (aged 80); Claiborne, Maryland, US
- Military career
- Allegiance: United States

Harrison Holt Richardson (June 16, 1919 – July 17, 1999) was the youngest member of Rear Admiral Richard E. Byrd's United States Antarctic Service Expedition from 1939 to 1941. As part of the expedition, Richardson was the first person to record color movie footage of Antarctica.
