= Paul Siple =

American explorer and geographer (1908–1968)

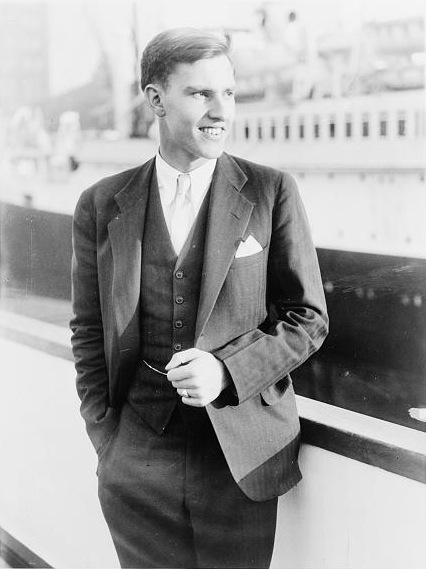
- Paul Siple in 1932
- Born: December 18, 1908; Montpelier, Ohio
- Died: November 25, 1968 (aged 59); Arlington, Virginia
- Burial place: National Memorial Park
- Known for: Byrd Expeditions
- Awards: Eagle Scout

Academic background
- Education: Allegheny College; Clark University
- Thesis: Adaptations of the Explorer to the Climate of Antarctica (1939)

Academic work
- Discipline: Geography
- Notable ideas: Wind chill

Paul Allman Siple (/ˈsaɪpəl/ SIGH-p'l; 1908 –1968) was an American Antarctic explorer and geographer who took part in six Antarctic expeditions, including the two Byrd expeditions of 1928–1931 and 1933–1935. Siple was also a Sea Scout. His first and third books covered these adventures. With Charles F. Passel he developed the wind chill factor, a term coined by Siple.

== Biography ==
Siple was born in Montpelier, Ohio on December 18, 1908, to Clyde Lavonius Siple and Fannie Hope Allman. His family moved to Erie, Pennsylvania, where he graduated from Central High School in 1926. He became an Eagle Scout in 1923 with 59 merit badges, under his Scoutmaster George Church. After an extensive nationwide search in 1928, he was the first Eagle Scout selected for an Antarctic expedition, sailing with Richard E. Byrd on his ship the City of New York. Siple appeared in the documentary film With Byrd at the South Pole (1930).

He became a brother of the Alpha Chi Rho fraternity while attending Allegheny College, in Meadville, Pennsylvania. He married Ruth Ida Johannesmeyer on December 19, 1936.

He also attended Clark University in Worcester, Massachusetts, from which he received a Ph.D. in 1939. His dissertation was on "Adaptations of the Explorer to the Climate of Antarctica". He worked in the Army Scientific Office for most of his career.

=== Career ===
Siple was involved with the United States Antarctic Service Expedition of 1939–1941, which would have been the third Byrd expedition. He served during Operation Highjump, (also known as the United States Navy Antarctic Developments Program 1946–1947), developed cold weather gear for the Korean War, and Operation Deep Freeze I in 1955–1956. He was the inaugural scientific leader at the U.S. Amundsen–Scott South Pole Station 1956–1957, during the International Geophysical Year. This activity is covered in his fourth book, 90 Degrees South.

From 1963 to 1966 he served as the first U.S. science attaché to Australia and New Zealand, where he had a stroke in 1966 and returned to the United States.

== Death ==
He died on November 25, 1968, at the Army Research Center in Arlington, Virginia.

== Legacy ==
Antarctic features Siple Coast, Siple Island, Mount Siple, Siple Ridge, and Siple Station were named in his honor, as well as Siple camp site at BSA Camp William Hinds.

Siple is noteworthy because he is one of a very few individuals to participate in all five of the Antarctic expeditions conducted by Richard E. Byrd.

== Honors ==
Siple received the Silver Buffalo Award from the BSA in 1947 and the Order of the Arrow National Distinguished Service Award in 1958. He received the Hubbard Medal from the National Geographic Society in 1958. In 1960 he was awarded the Hans Egede Medal by the Royal Danish Geographical Society. He also received the Byrd Antarctic Expedition Medal, the Second Byrd Antarctic Expedition Medal, United States Antarctic Expedition Medal and the Antarctica Service Medal.

== Works ==
- — (1931). A Boy Scout With Byrd. G.P. Putnam's Sons. LCCN 31004194. OCLC 1815561.
- — (1932). Exploring at Home. New York: G. P. Putnam. LCCN 32025873. OCLC 1051971.
- — (1936). Scout to Explorer: Back with Byrd in the Antarctic. New York: G. P. Putnam's Sons. LCCN 36027259.
- — (1959). 90° South: the story of the American South Pole conquest. Putnam. LCCN 59-11029. OCLC 30242309.

== See also ==
- Scouting in the Antarctic
