= United States Antarctic Expedition Medal =

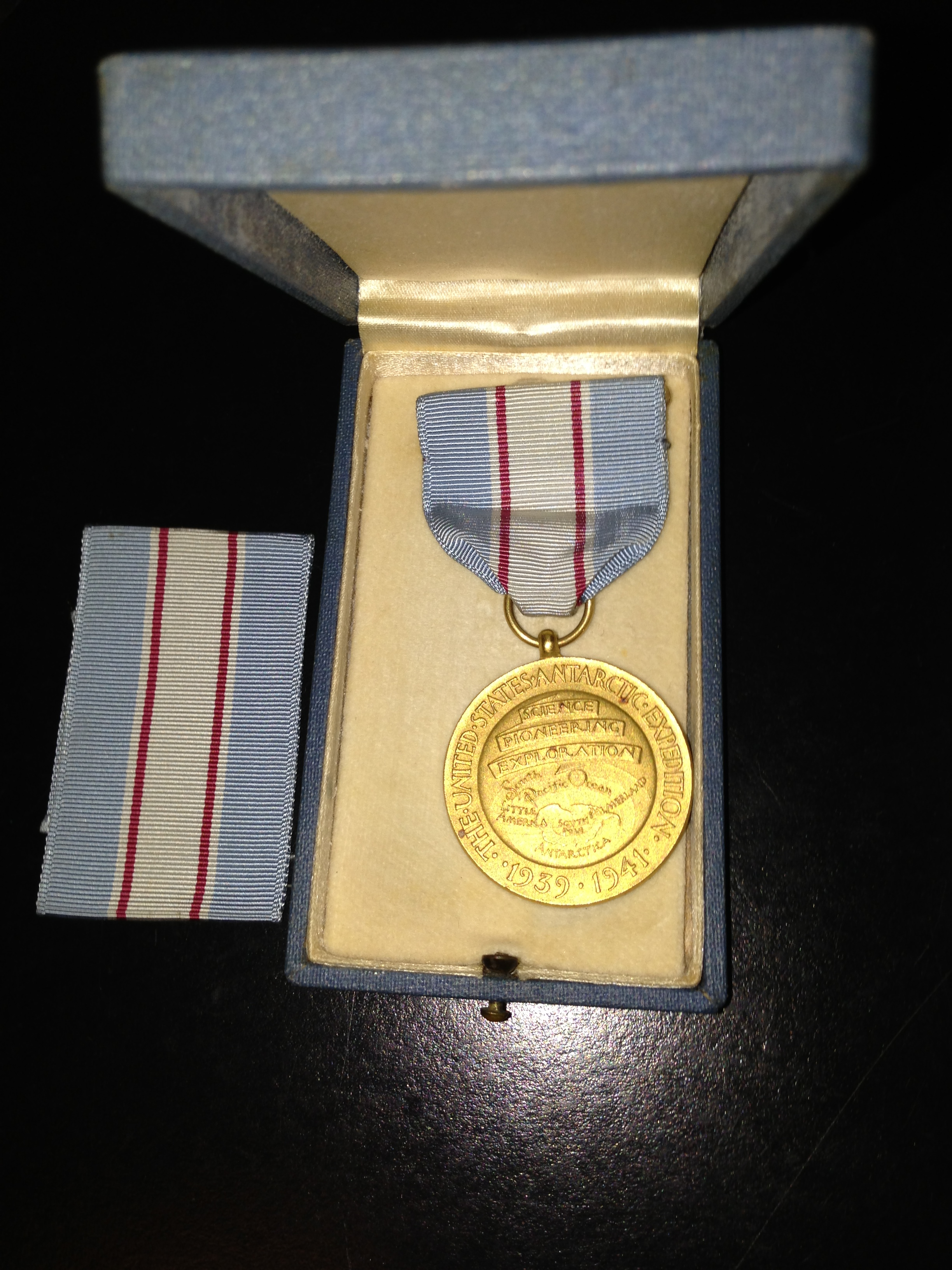
- Obverse
- Type: Military medal Service medal
- Awarded for: Valuable services to the Nation in the field of polar exploration and science
- Presented by: Department of the Navy
- Eligibility: Members of U.S. Antarctic Expedition (1939–1941)
- Status: Obsolete; replaced by Antarctica Service Medal
- Established: September 24, 1945
- Ribbon bar

Precedence
- Next (higher): World War II Victory Medal
- Next (lower): Navy Occupation Service Medal
- Related: Byrd Antarctic Expedition Medal; Second Byrd Antarctic Expedition Medal; Antarctica Service Medal

The United States Antarctic Expedition Medal is a combined military-civilian award that was authorized by the United States Congress on September 24, 1945 under Public Law 185 of the 79th Congress (59 Stat. 536). The award recognizes members of the United States Antarctic Expedition of 1939–1941. There were gold, silver, and bronze versions. It is unclear if the gold version is considered a Congressional Gold Medal, as was the case with the 1st Byrd expedition.

== Background ==
The statute awarding the medal reads as follows:

Be it enacted by the Senate and House of Representatives of the United States of America in Congress assembled, That the Secretary of the Navy is authorized and directed to cause to be made at the United States mint such number of gold, silver, and bronze medals of appropriate design as he may deem appropriate and necessary, to be presented to members of the United States Antarctic Expedition of 1939–1941, in recognition of their valuable services to the Nation in the field of polar exploration and science.

In 1935 Congress passed a law (Pub. L. 74–43) allowing the Secretary of the Navy to authorize—at his discretion—the wearing of commemorative or other special awards on Navy or Marine Corps uniforms, in military sized form.

The first United States Antarctic Expedition Medal (gold version) was presented to Admiral Richard E. Byrd.

As the 1st and 2nd Byrd Expedition medals, and the United States Antarctic Expedition medal were only authorized to be awarded to a select number of people, in 1960 the Antarctica Service Medal was created, which can be awarded generally.

== Precedence and wear ==
As recently as 1998 the Antarctic Expedition Medal still appeared in U.S. Navy uniform regulations precedence charts, after the WW II Victory Medal, and before the Navy Occupation Service Medal. In the 1953 Navy Awards Manual the Antarctic Expedition Medal was classified as a commemorative medal and ranked above all campaign service medals but below decorations, unit awards and all other commemorative medals.

== Notable recipients ==
- Rear Admiral Richard E. Byrd, USN (Retired)
- Vice Admiral Richard H. Cruzen, USN
- Rear Admiral George J. Dufek, USN
- Dr. Paul A. Siple, Ph.D.
- J. Glenn Dyer - Cadastral Engineer
