= Second Byrd Antarctic Expedition Medal =

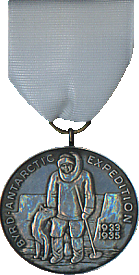
- Obverse
- Type: Military medal
- Awarded for: 6 months service at Little America or command of one of the expedition ships during the expedition
- Presented by: United States Congress
- Eligibility: Members of the Second Byrd Antarctic Expedition from 1933-1935
- Status: Obsolete
- Established: 2 June 1936
- First award: 15 October 1937 to Richard E. Byrd
- Final award: c. 1937

Highlights
- Total: 50
- Ribbon bar

Precedence
- Next (higher): Byrd Antarctic Expedition Medal
- Next (lower): United States Antarctic Expedition Medal
- Related: Peary Polar Expedition Medal

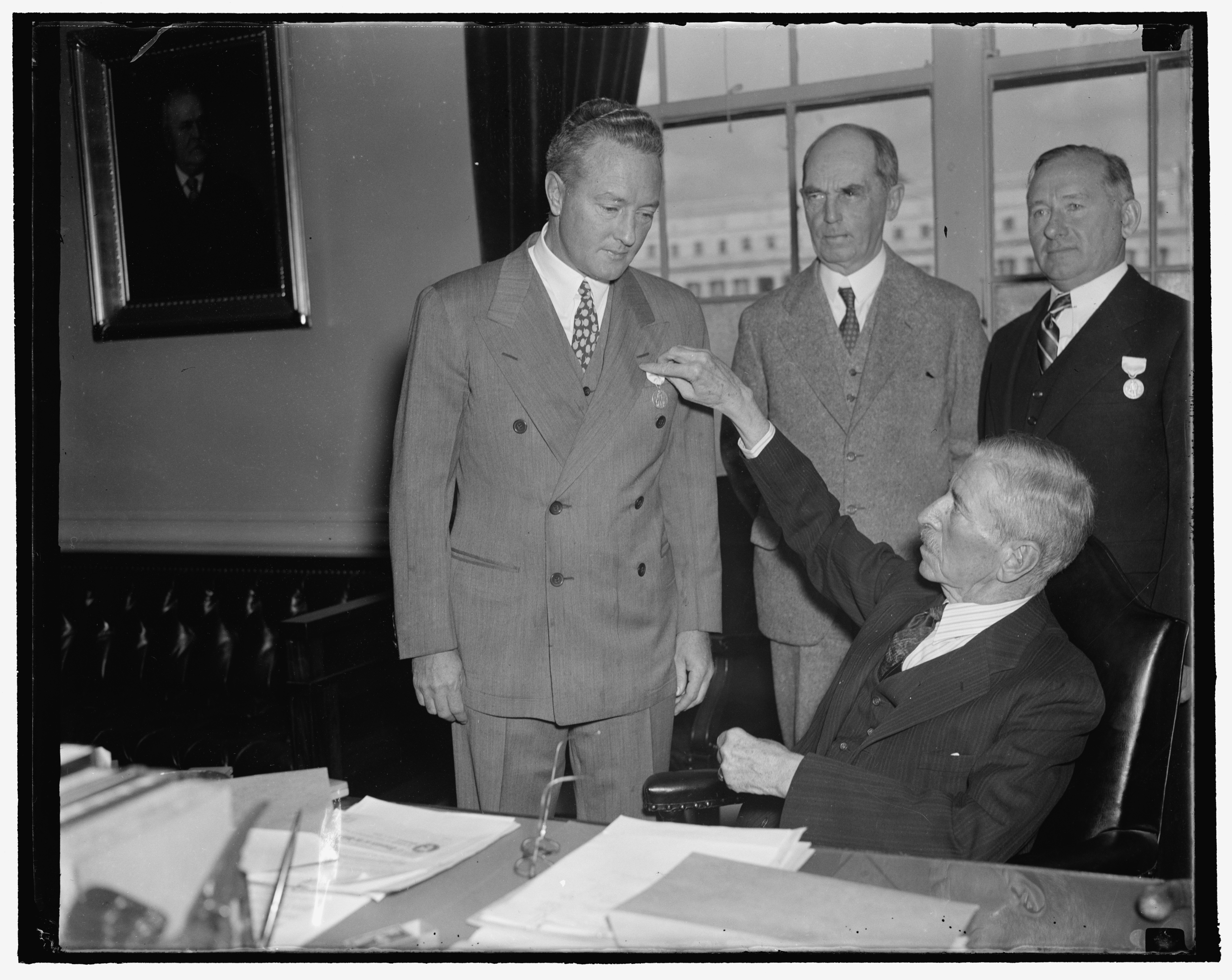
Medal being presented to its recipients by Claude A. Swanson, the secretary of the Navy (October 15, 1937)

The Second Byrd Antarctic Expedition Medal was established by Act of Congress in 1936 to commemorate the Second Byrd Antarctic Expedition.

== Criteria ==
Established by an act of congress on 2 June 1936, the Second Byrd Antarctic Expedition Medal was awarded to expedition members who spent six months, the entire winter night, at Little America. Commanders of the expeditions ships, who commanded throughout the expedition from 1933 through 1935, were also eligible. These criteria limited the award of the medals to 50 recipients.

== Appearance ==
The medal is a circular a silver medallion 1 1/4 inches in diameter. The obverse depicts the figure of Admiral Byrd, in polar clothing with a sled dog standing to the left. To the right of the figure, in two lines, are the dates 1933 1935. The inscription BYRD ANTARCTIC EXPEDITION arcs around the top of the medal. The reverse has a rectangle bearing the inscription, in 14 lines: PRESENTED TO THE OFFICERS AND MEN OF THE SECOND BYRD ANT- ARCTIC EXPEDITION TO EXPRESS THE VERY HIGH ADMIRATION IN WHICH THE CONGRESS AND THE AMERICAN PEOPLE HOLD THEIR HEROIC AND UNDAUNTED ACCOMPLISHMENTS FOR SCIENCE UNEQUALLED IN THE HISTORY OF POLAR EXPLORATION. A Ford Tri-Motor airplane appears above the tablet in relief with a dog sled, "Little America" buildings, and the sailing ship "City of New York" around the rectangle. The medal is suspended from a solid white silk ribbon.

== Notable recipients ==
- Rear Admiral Richard E. Byrd, USN (Retired)
- Harold June, USN
- Thomas Poulter
- Dr. Paul A. Siple, Ph.D.
