= List of places named Fairway Rock =

There are three islands and six other geographical places called Fairway Rock.

Type	Name	Location	Longitude	Latitude
Island	Fairway Rock	Bering Strait, Alaska, USA	– / 168° / 45'	+ / 65° / 37'.5
Island	Fairway Rock	Sitka, Alaska, USA	– / 136° / 19'	+ / 57° / 47'.4
Mountain	Fairway Rock	South Georgia Island	– / 36° / 01'	– / 54° / 50'
Rock in the sea	Fairway Rock	Jersey, Channel Islands	– / 2° / 07'.8	+ / 49° / 09'.2
Mountain	Fairway Rock	French Southern Territories	+ / 69° / 49'	– / 49° / 08'
Island	Fairway Rock	Malaysia	+ / 100° / 33'	+ / 4° / 07'
Reef	Fairway Rock	Papua New Guinea	+ / 150° / 57'	– / 5° / 03'
Mountain	Fairway Rock	Australia	+ / 151° / 10'	– / 23° / 25'
Mountain	Fairway Rock	Solomon Islands	+ / 160° / 29'	– / 9° / 30'
