= USS Yancey =

US Navy Andromeda-class attack cargo ship

Coordinates: 34.1712°N 76.2283°W

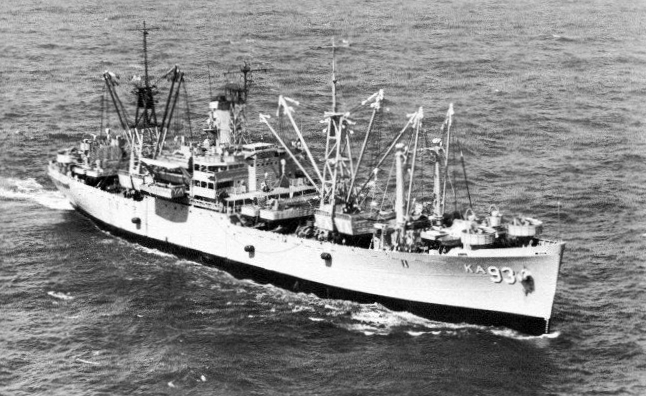
- USS Yancey (AKA-93) in 1965

History

United States
- Name: USS Yancey
- Namesake: Yancey County, North Carolina
- Builder: Moore Dry Dock Company, Oakland, California
- Yard number: 280
- Laid down: 22 May 1944
- Launched: 8 July 1944
- Sponsored by: Miss Beverly Bartlett
- Commissioned: 11 October 1944
- Decommissioned: March 1958
- Recommissioned: 17 November 1961
- Decommissioned: 20 January 1971
- Stricken: 1 January 1977
- Home port: 1946: San Francisco, California; 1961: Norfolk, Virginia
- Honors and awards: 5 battle stars; World War II (2); Korean War (3)
- Fate: Sunk as an artificial reef off Morehead City, NC, 1990

General characteristics
- Class & type: Andromeda-class attack cargo ship
- Type: C2-S-B1
- Tonnage: 4,450 long tons deadweight (DWT)
- Displacement: 13,910 long tons (14,130 t) (fully loaded)
- Length: 459 ft 3 in (139.98 m) (length overall); 435 ft 0 in (132.59 m) (lpp)
- Beam: 63 ft (19 m)
- Draft: 26 ft 4 in (8.03 m)
- Propulsion: 1 × steam turbine
- Speed: 16.5 knots (30.6 km/h)
- Boats & landing craft carried: 8 × LCMs; 1 × LCP(L); 15 × LCVPs
- Complement: 368
- Armament: 1 × 5 in (130 mm)/38caliber dual purpose gun mount; 4 × twin 40-millimeter (1.6 in) gun mounts, 16 × 20-millimeter (0.79 in) gun mounts

USS Yancey (AKA-93/LKA-93) was an Andromeda-class attack cargo ship built by the Moore Dry Dock Company of Oakland, California for the United States Navy during World War II. The ship was named in honor of Yancey County, North Carolina.

Yancey's keel was laid in May 1944, and the ship was launched in July, and commissioned in October. The ship operated in the Pacific during the war and was a participant in the amphibious landings at Iwo Jima in February 1945 and Okinawa in April. After Japan's surrender in August, Yancey was in Tokyo Bay during the signing of the Japanese Instrument of Surrender on 2 September. The ship made voyages delivering troops for the occupation of Japan before returning to the United States in January 1946. After spending most of the next year on the east coast, Yancey was ordered back into the Pacific in November, and took part in Operation Highjump, a Navy expedition to Antarctica in January 1947; Yancey Glacier was named in the ship's honor.

After spending most of the next decade in duties in the Western Pacific, Yancey was decommissioned in March 1958 and placed in reserve at Olympia, Washington. Yancey was reactivated in the aftermath of the Berlin Crisis of 1961 and recommissioned in November. During the October 1962 Cuban Missile Crisis she sailed in support of the U.S. blockade of Cuba, and during the April 1965 U.S. intervention in the Dominican Republic she carried almost a quarter of all of the evacuees from Santo Domingo. In January 1970, Yancey was blown by a storm into the Chesapeake Bay Bridge-Tunnel which closed the structure for several weeks.

The ship was decommissioned for the final time in January 1971, and struck from the Naval Vessel Register in January 1977. After being stripped of salvageable materials, the ship was sunk as an artificial reef off the North Carolina coast in 1990. The ship is intact and rests on her starboard side at a depth of 160 feet (49 m).

== Design and construction ==
Yancey was laid down under a United States Maritime Commission contract (MC hull 1193) on 22 May 1944 by the Moore Dry Dock Company at Oakland, California. The ship was launched on 8 July 1944 and was sponsored by Miss Beverly Bartlett. As built, Yancey was just over 459 feet (140 m) long and 63 feet (19 m) abeam. When fully loaded she had a displacement of 13,910 long tons (14,130 t) and drew a little more than 26 feet (7.9 m). She was powered by a single steam turbine capable of generating 6,000 shaft horsepower (4,500 kW), and attained a top speed of 16.5 knots (30.6 km/h) during her trials.

Yancey was equipped to carry eight LCMs ("Landing Craft Mechanized"), which were designed to land vehicles in amphibious landings; one LCP(L) ("Landing Craft, Personnel (Large)"); and fifteen LCVPs ("Landing Craft, Vehicle, Personnel"), or Higgins boats. Yancey was outfitted with primarily defensive weapons: one 5 in (130 mm)/38 caliber dual-purpose gun mount, four twin 40-millimeter (1.6 in) anti-aircraft (AA) gun mounts; and sixteen 20-millimeter (0.79 in) AA gun mounts.

== World War II ==
The ship was commissioned as USS Yancey (AKA-93) on 11 October 1944. After fitting out at San Francisco, California, Yancey received her boat group of 26 landing craft and conducted a shakedown cruise out of San Pedro, Los Angeles. After post-shakedown alterations and repairs at San Diego, California, she sailed for San Francisco to load cargo from 18 to 24 November. Yancey sailed for Pearl Harbor the next day, and was assigned to Transport Division (TransDiv) 47, Transport Squadron (TransRon) 16 upon her arrival on 2 December.

=== Iwo Jima ===
After remaining at Pearl Harbor until 27 January 1945, Yancey departed for the Marianas with elements and cargo of the 5th Marine Division as part of Task Group (TG) 51.12 in support of the invasion of Iwo Jima. After stops for fuel and supplies at Eniwetok and invasion rehearsals at Tinian, the ship arrived off Iwo Jima at 06:24 on 19 February, D-day for the initial landing. During almost continuous operations for the first four days of the battle, Yancey only lost two landing craft (LCVPs): one to enemy mortar fire, and another to heavy surf. Yancey received minor damage when she collided with Pensacola while transferring 8-inch (200 mm) ammunition to the heavy cruiser.

On 29 February, after the tactical situation ashore had improved sufficiently, Yancey anchored off "Red" beach to unload her general cargo. During this time the ship was hit by one long-range mortar shell, but suffered no casualties among her crew. Slowed by nightly air raids, and high surf that required cargo to be offloaded to LSTs, LSMs, and LCTs, Yancey completed her unloading on 2 March. The cargo ship sailed with three other transports and a pair of screening destroyers to Saipan and then to Espiritu Santo, where she rejoined her TransRon 16 squadron mates in embarking the 27th Infantry Division.

=== Okinawa ===
Yancey sailed on 25 March as a part of TG 51.3, the designated "mobile reserve" for the invasion of Okinawa. As the group headed for a planned stop in the Carolines, Yancey took a disabled LSM under tow and delivered the vessel to Ulithi. TransDiv 47 was detached from TG 51.3 and arrived off Kerama Retto on 9 April, eight days after the battle had commenced. After receiving her orders, Yancey anchored off the Hagushi beaches on the 12th. During her four days of unloading, the crew was hampered by Japanese air raids and delayed—according to the ship's commander—over 15 hours because of the attacks. Yancey's number four 40 millimetres (1.6 in) mount claimed a "sure assist" on a Nakajima Ki-43 "Oscar" fighter that crashed 3,000 yards (2,700 m) from the ship. Despite delays caused by the air attacks, Yancey was the first attack cargo ship of her group to finish unloading, and sailed independently for the Marianas on the 16th. During her stay off the Okinawa beaches, the ship lost none of her boats and suffered three casualties: two men were wounded by shrapnel, and another broke an arm.

After a short rest-and-recreation stop at Guam, Yancey rejoined her squadron at Ultihi and underwent boiler repairs and intensive antiaircraft training; her crew won numerous five-case "beer prizes" for shooting down target sleeves. Getting underway again on 8 May, Yancey spent the next two months shuttling men and materiel from rear area bases, calling at Manus in the Admiralty Islands; Finschhafen, New Guinea; Tulagi; Hollandia, Dutch New Guinea; and finally Guiuan, on the island of Samar, in the Philippines. She rejoined TransDiv 47, TransRon 16, at San Pedro Bay, Leyte Gulf, on 16 July and sailed with the rest of the division to Iloilo, on the island of Panay, to conduct amphibious training exercises with the United States Army's 43rd Infantry Division.

Yancey was in the Philippines when word of the Japanese surrender came in on 15 August. TransDiv 47 took on provisions at Iloilo after training exercises for the planned invasion of Japan were cancelled; after arriving at Batangas, Luzon, Philippines, she embarked elements of the 1st Cavalry Division slated for the occupation of Japan.

After completing the loading process on 23 August, Yancey weighed anchor on the 25th as a member of Task Force (TF) 33. However, the ships had to turn back because of a tropical storm in the vicinity. The typhoon delayed the task force for only a day, as the ships weathered the fringes of the storm at Subic Bay before again getting underway soon thereafter. Yancey entered Tokyo Bay on the morning of 2 September, the day Japan signed the formal articles of surrender on the deck of the battleship Missouri anchored there. Shortly after the conclusion of those ceremonies, the attack cargo ship headed into Yokohama harbor, the third ship in her squadron to enter that port and the first to start unloading. The ship completed her unloading in 19 hours and then proceeded to an anchorage off Yokohama.

During her World War II service, Yancey was awarded two battle stars.

== Post war ==
Yancey's squadron departed on 4 September 1945 and steamed via Leyte Gulf to Zamboanga. There, they commenced loading elements of the Army's 41st Infantry Division from 16 to 18 September. Yancey and her sisters shifted soon thereafter to Bugo, Mindanao, where she picked up Army LCMs. After TG 54.28 had assembled in Leyte Gulf on 21 September, the group—which included Yancey—sailed for Japan's Inland Sea.

Due to minesweeping difficulties, however, the landings scheduled for the Kure–Hiroshima area were postponed; and the task group sailed instead for Buckner Bay, Okinawa. On 28 September, the ship put to sea to evade another typhoon. On 1 October, she returned and anchored in Buckner Bay. Two days later, Yancey again headed for Japanese waters and entered Bungo Suido on the 5th, beginning the long, difficult passage up the Inland Sea along the channel swept through the minefields. The next morning—after spending the night anchored in the cleared channel—Yancey headed for Hiro Wan, where the landings were made. The ship completed her unloading in 48 hours. On 9 October, she was detached from TransRon 16 and reported to CinCPac for assignment. The following day, Yancey rode out a third typhoon with 130 fathoms (240 m) of chain on deck, a second anchor ready to go, and steam at the throttle.

The attack cargo ship, remaining behind when the rest of her squadron was sent back to the United States on 11 October, headed instead to Haiphong, French Indochina to embark Chinese troops. After an 11-day delay, 1,027 officers and men of the 471st Regiment, 62nd Chinese Army—and one interpreter—boarded the American vessel for passage to Takao, Formosa. After arrival, the Chinese troops had all been offloaded by 17:00 on 17 November. After sailing to Manila, Yancey received orders to proceed to the United States on 25 November, one year to the day she had sailed from San Francisco. Yancey took on a capacity load of Army and Navy men returning to the United States for discharge and departed Manila harbor on 27 November. During the voyage, she flew a 310-foot (94 m) "homeward-bound pennant" adorned with 27 stars.

After a stop at Pearl Harbor for boiler repairs and to offload her Army passengers, Yancey sailed for Balboa, Panama Canal Zone, reaching there on the last day of the year; she was the last ship to transit the Panama Canal in 1945. On 6 January 1946, Yancey cleared Cristobal, Canal Zone, bound for Louisiana. After a brief stop at New Orleans, the attack cargo ship proceeded on, via Jacksonville, Florida, to Norfolk, where she arrived on 29 January. Less than a month later, on 27 February, Yancey sailed farther north and reached the Philadelphia Naval Shipyard the following day.

Over the next few months, Yancey underwent a regular overhaul there and then operated off the eastern seaboard and into the western Atlantic. During that time, she called at Bayonne, New Jersey; Bermuda; San Juan, Puerto Rico; Guantánamo Bay, Cuba; Balboa, Canal Zone; Jacksonville, Florida; and made return calls at Norfolk, Bayonne, and Bermuda. In addition, the ship visited the New York Naval Shipyard and Davisville, Rhode Island, before being assigned tentatively to TF 68 effective on 9 November.

== Operation Highjump ==
In compliance with her new orders, Yancey proceeded back to the west coast, sailing via Cristobal and the Panama Canal. After arriving at San Pedro, California, Yancey reported for duty with TF 68 and was reassigned to the Pacific Fleets Service Force and homeported at San Francisco, on 11 November. The next day, she shifted to Port Hueneme, California, where she began loading cargo for Operation Highjump, the U.S. Navy expedition to Antarctica.

Departing Port Hueneme on 2 December, Yancey pressed southward, headed for Antarctica, and spent Christmas at sea. Two days later, she saw her first icebergs—visible evidence that she was entering the polar latitudes. She sighted the northern limit of the Antarctic pack ice on the 28th and spent the next two days investigating ice conditions. She fueled from USS Canisteo 10 nautical miles (19 km) south of Scott Island, Antarctica, purportedly becoming the first ship to conduct an underway refueling below the Antarctic Circle.

After threading her way through the pack ice over the ensuing weeks, Yancey finally arrived at Bay of Whales, Antarctica, mooring at the shelf ice on 18 January 1947. Subsequently, departing that "port" on 6 February for the area to the north of the ice floes, the attack cargo ship entered the pack ice on the 9th. Over the next three days, she pressed through the floes that extended for a width of almost 275 nautical miles (509 km).

On 13 February, Yancey joined TU 68.1.2 which also included the Coast Guard icebreaker Northwind, towing the attack cargo ship Merrick. Within a week, the ships were riding out a fierce storm that justified—at least to Yancey sailors—the Antarctic's title as "The World's Stormiest Sea". Yancey reached Port Chalmers, New Zealand, on 22 February and departed that port on 5 March, bound for Samoa.

Subsequently, departing Pago Pago on 27 March bound for Hawaii with YTL-153 in tow, the attack cargo ship arrived at Pearl Harbor on 14 April. She soon got underway for the west coast of the United States and reached Port Hueneme on 2 May 1947. There, Yancey disembarked a unit of a construction battalion ("Seabees") and discharged TF 68 cargo. Her duty with TF 68 thus completed on 15 May, Yancey reported for duty with Service Division (ServDiv) 12. Shortly thereafter, Yancey shifted to San Pedro before heading to Terminal Island, California, for restricted availability on 20 May. After that period of repairs and alterations, Yancey returned to Port Hueneme to load cargo earmarked for shipment to Pearl Harbor and Guam.

== Korean War ==
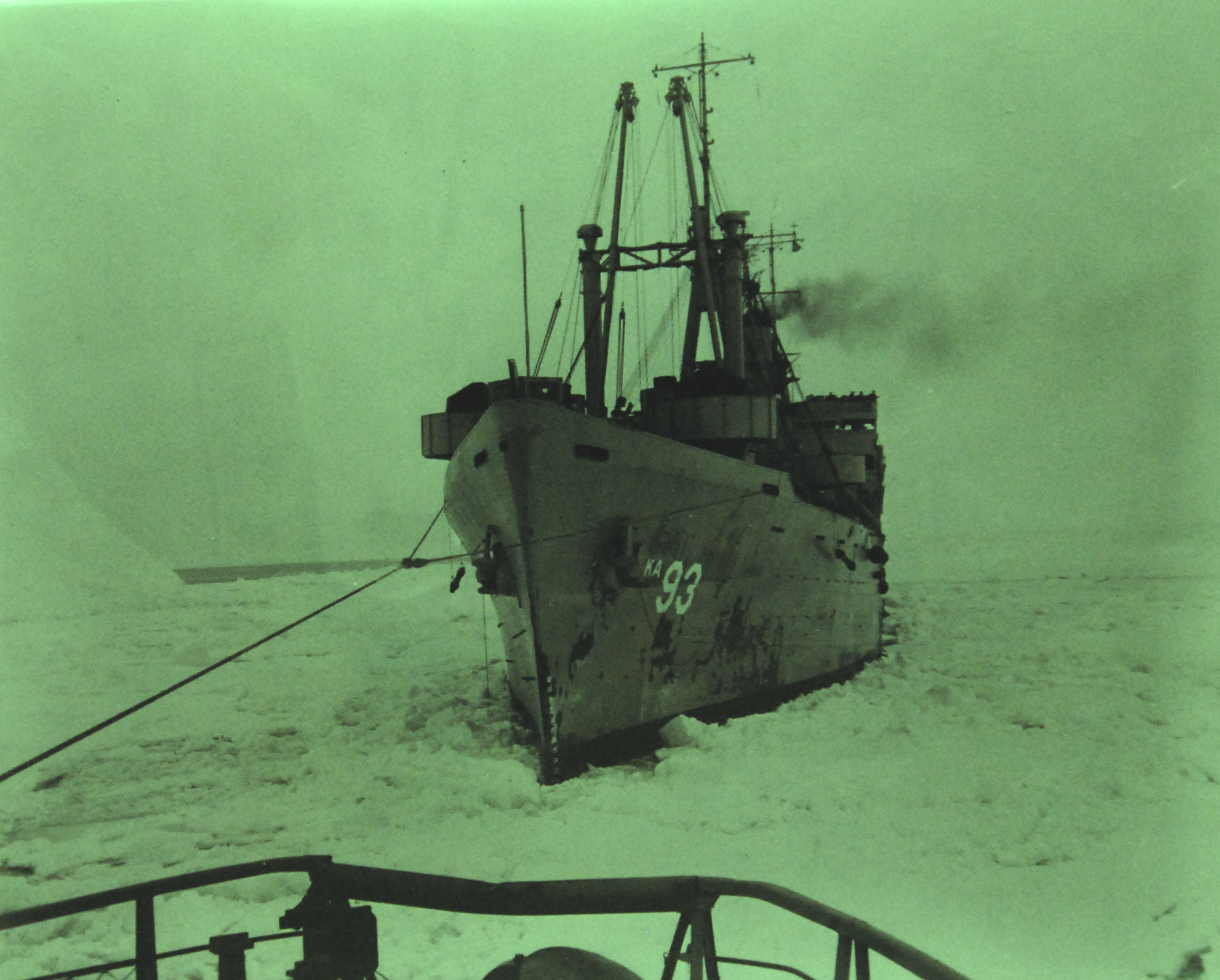
USCGC Northwind towing Yancey towards an area of less dangerous ice during Operation Deep Freeze, 1956–1957

Over the next decade, Yancey operated between west coast ports and advanced bases in the Western Pacific (WestPac), including ports in Japan, Korea, and the Philippines. During that period, she also supported United Nations (UN) actions in Korea, operating in support of the initial attempts to fight the North Korean advance; in the first UN counteroffensives in early 1951; and in the final phases of activity that preceded the armistice in the summer of 1953. Yancey was awarded three battle stars for her Korean War service.

In December 1957, after having served continuously since 1944, Yancey was deactivated at San Francisco. She was placed out of commission in March 1958, and entered the Reserve Fleet at Olympia, Washington, on 11 October 1960.

== Recommissioning ==
In the aftermath of the Berlin Crisis of 1961, Yancey was reactivated as part of President John F. Kennedy's bid to build up the U.S. Navy. On 17 November 1961, Yancey was recommissioned at Portland, Oregon. The ship departed from San Diego on 12 January 1962 and reached Norfolk, her new assigned home port, on 2 February, there becoming the newest member of Amphibious Squadron (PhibRon) 12. Over the next months, Yancey took part in a variety of exercises and maneuvers.

Yancey participated in Operation Phiblex in the spring of 1962, operating off Roosevelt Roads and Vieques, Puerto Rico. She later paid a port call at Charlotte Amalie, St. Thomas, Virgin Islands, before she returned to Roosevelt Roads and reloaded equipment and embarked Marines slated to return to Morehead City, North Carolina. Subsequently, returning to Norfolk on 2 May, Yancey touched briefly at Charleston, South Carolina, to take on additional landing craft before returning to the Tidewater region to spend the remainder of May.

Subsequently, visiting Boston, and Rockland, Maine, Yancey participated in amphibious boat exercises at Provincetown, Massachusetts, before she got underway on 24 July for Davisville, Rhode Island. There, she loaded a Seabee unit and their equipment and headed eastward, bound for Rota, Spain. Offloading one Seabee unit and onloading another, Yancey then paused briefly at Gibraltar before touching at Lisbon on the return leg of her voyage to the United States. Disembarking the seabees and unloading their equipment at Davisville, Yancey headed back to Norfolk, reaching her homeport on 18 August 1962.

On 17 October, Yancey again sailed from Norfolk and proceeded to Morehead City, to load marines and equipment for Operation PhiBrigLex (Amphibious Brigade Exercises) slated for Vieques, Puerto Rico. Upon arrival, the attack cargo ship loaded immediately and set out to join the rest of the ships in the squadron. She soon was fighting her way through Hurricane Ella which caused her to alter her course to avoid the most severe part of the storm.

== Cuban Missile Crisis and Dominican Republic operations ==
On 23 October 1962, President Kennedy ordered a naval quarantine of Cuba in response to the presence of Soviet missiles on the soil of that island nation. Yancey sortied in support of the American operations in the Caribbean, and remained on station until the missiles were removed and tensions were relaxed. Over the next few years, Yancey made regular deployments to the Mediterranean to take part in joint exercises with NATO forces.

In April 1965, Yancey was ordered to the Dominican Republic to support Operation Power Pack, the code name for the United States' intervention in the Dominican Republic. The attack cargo ship arrived at Santo Domingo, the capital city, on 30 April. Yancey loaded nearly 600 evacuees from 21 nations. Among those on board the ship were the daughter of William Tapley Bennett Jr., the United States Ambassador to the Dominican Republic; the Belgian Ambassador to the Dominican Republic; sixteen nuns from the Dominican Order; and several large families. Yancey's officers and crew vacated their quarters to allow room for female passengers and children, and many slept on the decks of the ship during the passage to San Juan, Puerto Rico. One of the passengers gave birth during the short trip, and gave her son the middle name of Yancey in honor of the ship.

After debarking her passengers at San Juan on 1 May, the ship took on supplies needed by the American ground forces in Santo Domingo: gasoline, oil, and ammunition. She docked in Santo Domingo on 2 May and exchanged her cargo for 450 more evacuees to be taken to San Juan. In all, Yancey carried almost a quarter of those fleeing the Dominican Republic. She returned to Norfolk soon thereafter, and resumed her role of training and cruising off the eastern seaboard and into the Caribbean basin. On 1 January 1969, Yancey was redesignated as LKA-93.

== Chesapeake Bay Bridge-Tunnel incident ==
On 21 January 1970, Yancey was at anchor near one stretch of the Chesapeake Bay Bridge-Tunnel near Norfolk. Driven by the winds in a snowy gale that gusted up to 50 miles per hour (80 km/h), Yancey dragged her anchors and hit the bridge, knocking it out of service for several weeks. The Navy started a free shuttle service for commuters who normally used the route, using helicopters and Landing Craft Utilities. There were no vehicles on the bridge at the time of the collision, and no one was injured. The ship deployed to the Mediterranean a few months later.

After a return to the United States in mid-1970, Yancey entered inactive status at Norfolk on 1 October of that year. The ship was decommissioned at Norfolk on 20 January 1971, and entered the James River berthing area of the National Defense Reserve Fleet. Yancey was stricken from the Naval Vessel Register on 1 January 1977. The vessel remained in the James River fleet until 16 August 1984 when she was withdrawn to be stripped of useful equipment by the U.S. Navy. She re-entered the fleet one year later, on 28 August 1985, but was withdrawn for the final time on 15 December 1989 to be prepared for sinking as an artificial reef.

In 1990, the vessel was sunk as an artificial reef off Morehead City, North Carolina, and rests on her starboard side at a depth of 160 feet (49 m).
