= Richard Cruzen =

United States Navy Vice admiral and Antarctic explorer

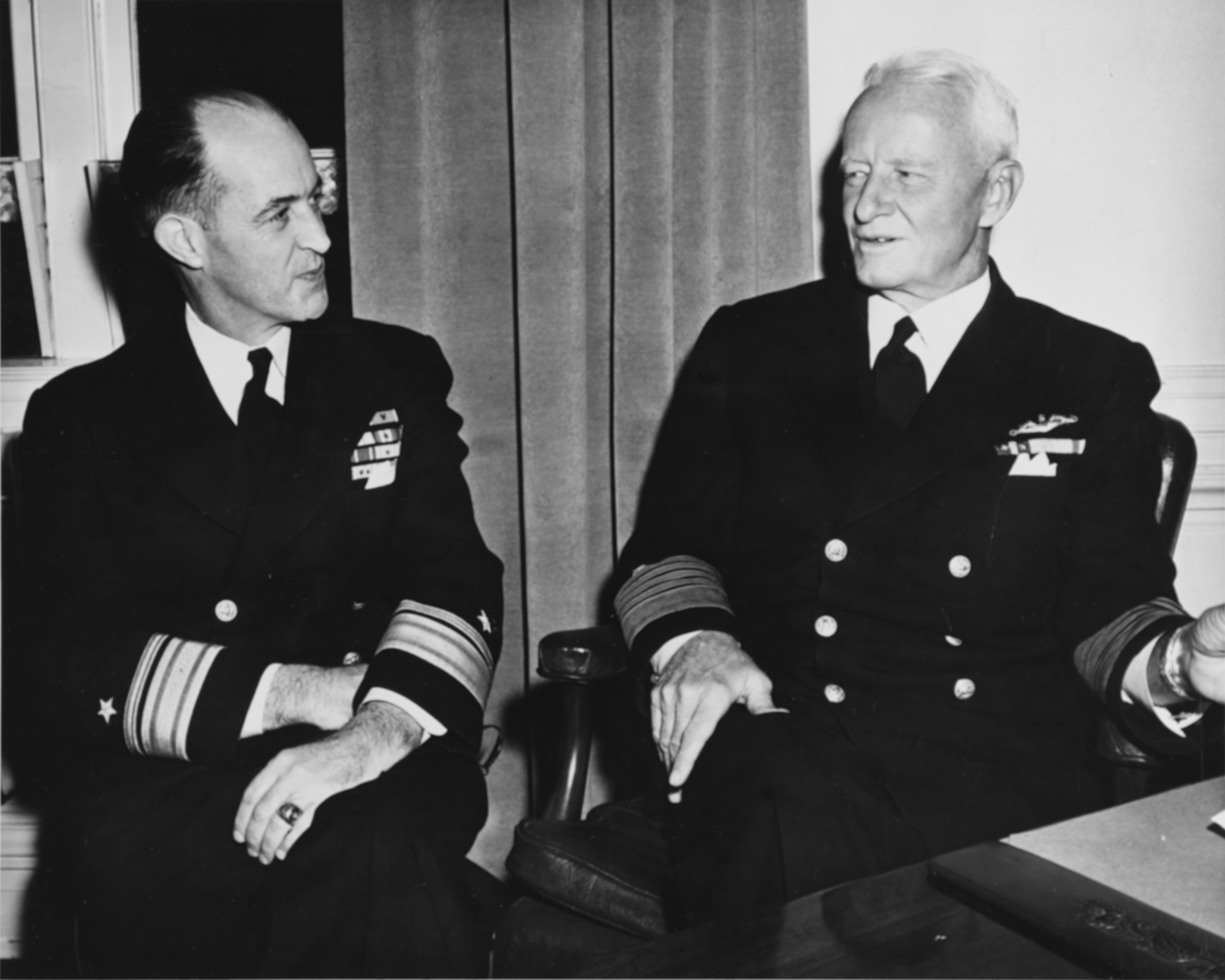
- Rear Adm. Cruzen with Fleet Adm. Nimitz in 1948
- Born: Richard Harold Cruzen; April 28, 1897; Kansas City, Missouri, U.S.
- Died: April 15, 1970 (aged 72); Camp Pendleton, California, U.S.
- Military career
- Allegiance: United States of America
- Branch: United States Navy
- Service years: 1917–1954
- Rank: Vice Admiral
- Commands: U.S. Naval Forces, Philippines; Naval Base Pearl Harbor; Cruiser Division Two; USS Birmingham
- Conflicts: World War I World War II
- Awards: Legion of Merit

Richard Harold Cruzen (April 28, 1897 – April 15, 1970) was a decorated United States Navy officer with the rank of Vice Admiral. A veteran of both World Wars, he is best known for his participation and leadership in Antarctic expeditions.

== Early life ==
Cruzen was born on April 28, 1897, in Kansas City, Missouri. After graduation from Gallatin High School in Gallatin, Missouri, he attended the Virginia Military Institute and the Severn School in Severna Park, Maryland. He was appointed to the United States Naval Academy in 1916.

== Early career ==
As a midshipman, Cruzen served on the battleship USS Mississippi (BB-41) during the First World War. The Mississippi operated with the Atlantic Fleet during the summer of 1918. Cruzen graduated from the Naval Academy in 1919 and was commissioned as an ensign. His first assignment was to the battleship USS Idaho (BB-42).

Between the years of 1925 and 1937 Cruzen served on a number of ships of different types. Ships he served on included the battleships USS Nevada (BB-36) and USS California (BB-44). Other ships he served on were the destroyers Claxton, Delphy, Sinclair, Shirk, Elliott, Pope and Simpson and the destroyer tender USS Rigel (AD-13).

Cruzen was a graduate of the command course at the United States Naval War College.

== United States Antarctic Service Expedition ==
On September 11, 1939, Cruzen assumed command of the 65-year-old screw barkentine USS Bear (AG-29). Bear participated in the United States Antarctic Service Expedition, under the command of Rear Admiral Richard E. Byrd, a renowned aviator and explorer who led the government financed expedition to evaluate the economic and military value of the Antarctic continent. Cruzen's navigator aboard Bear was Lieutenant George J. Dufek, who would later serve in Operation Highjump and Operation Deep Freeze.

Navy records state that 1,000 miles of new coastline was discovered by survey missions by the Bear and aircraft. After the expedition, Cruzen was commended by Secretary of the Navy Frank Knox for "superior seamanship, ability, courage, determination, efficiency and good judgment in dangerous emergencies". Cruzen was one of only 16 members of the 1939-41 expedition who received the United States Antarctic Expedition Medal in gold, which was presented in November 1946.

== Second World War ==
During the Second World War, Cruzen served first on the staff of Naval War College in Newport, Rhode Island, before departed for Pacific as chief of staff to Vice Admiral Arthur S. Carpender, Commander of the 7th Fleet from July 18 to September 26, 1943. He served as an operations officer on the staff of Vice Admiral Thomas C. Kinkaid during the campaign to liberate the Philippines in 1944 to 1945. Cruzen was decorated with Legion of Merit for his service on 7th Fleet's staff.

He commanded the light cruiser USS Birmingham from August 9, 1945, to October 10, 1946. Cruzen was selected for promotion to rear admiral in November 1946 with his date of rank retroactive to 1944.

== Operation Highjump ==
In 1946, Admiral Richard E. Byrd was selected as officer in charge of the Navy's Antarctic Developments Project, also known as Operation Highjump. Cruzen was chosen to commanded Task Force 68, which constituted the vast majority of the resources assigned to the operation. Task Force 68 consisted of 4,700 personnel, a command ship, an aircraft carrier, two destroyers, two icebreakers, two seaplane tenders, two supply ships, two tankers and a submarine. This was by far the largest Antarctic expedition up to that time and, possibly, the largest in history.

Cruzen departed the United States on board his flagship, the USS Mount Olympus, on December 2, 1946. Personnel assigned to the expedition included meteorologists, zoologists, physicists, and experts from oceanographic institutes. Besides gathering scientific data, another goal of the expedition was to train Navy personnel and to test Navy ships and other equipment in cold weather and ice operations.

Cruzen's task force navigated through several hundred miles of ice before reaching the Little America base camp. The expedition was beset by icebergs and inconsistent weather throughout its service. Among the discoveries made during Operation Highjump were finding two "oases", one a region of ice-free lakes and land. More than 300,000 square miles of uncharted territory were mapped by aircraft. This led to updating of existing charts and maps of the Antarctic.

Cruzen appears briefly in the documentary film The Secret Land about Operation Highjump. The Secret Land, produced by the U.S. Navy, was released in 1948 and won the Academy Award for Best Documentary.

== Late career ==
After Operation Highjump, Cruzen was placed in command of Cruiser Division Two which was a unit of the 6th Fleet in the Mediterranean Sea. On April 2, 1949, he attended the re-interment in Tripoli, Libya of the remains of five unidentified American sailors killed when the ketch USS Intrepid exploded in Tripoli Harbor in 1804.

In January 1950, Cruzen was ordered to Hawaii and assumed duty as Commander, Naval Base Pearl Harbor and held this command for two years, before was appointed Commander, U.S. Naval Forces, Philippines. He retired from the Navy on June 30, 1954, after almost 37 years of active service and advanced to the rank of Vice admiral on the retired list for having been specially commended in combat. Cruzen was awarded the Philippine Legion of Honor in 1956 for his service in the Philippines.

Vice admiral Richard H. Cruzen lived in San Clemente, California after retirement and died on April 15, 1970, in the Naval Hospital at Camp Pendleton, California. He was survived by his wife Margaret Beaty Cruzen and a daughter.

Cruzen was buried at Arlington National Cemetery on April 20, 1970. His wife was interred beside him on December 12, 1983.

== Awards ==

1st Row	Legion of Merit		World War I Victory Medal
2nd Row	Second Nicaraguan Campaign Medal	Yangtze Service Medal	American Defense Service Medal
3rd Row	American Campaign Medal	Asiatic-Pacific Campaign Medal	World War II Victory Medal
4th Row	United States Antarctic Expedition Medal	Navy Occupation Service Medal	National Defense Service Medal
5th Row	Antarctica Service Medal	Philippine Legion of Honor	Philippine Liberation Medal

== Dates of rank ==
- Midshipman - June 16, 1916
- Ensign - June 7, 1919
- Lieutenant (junior grade) - June 7, 1922
- Lieutenant - June 7, 1925
- Lieutenant Commander - October 1, 1935
- Commander - April 1, 1941
- Captain - June 20, 1942
- Rear Admiral - November 27, 1946 (Date of rank - April 1, 1944)
- Vice Admiral, Retired List - June 30, 1954
