= Charles W. Thomas (captain) =

Flag officer in United States Coast Guard (1903–1973)

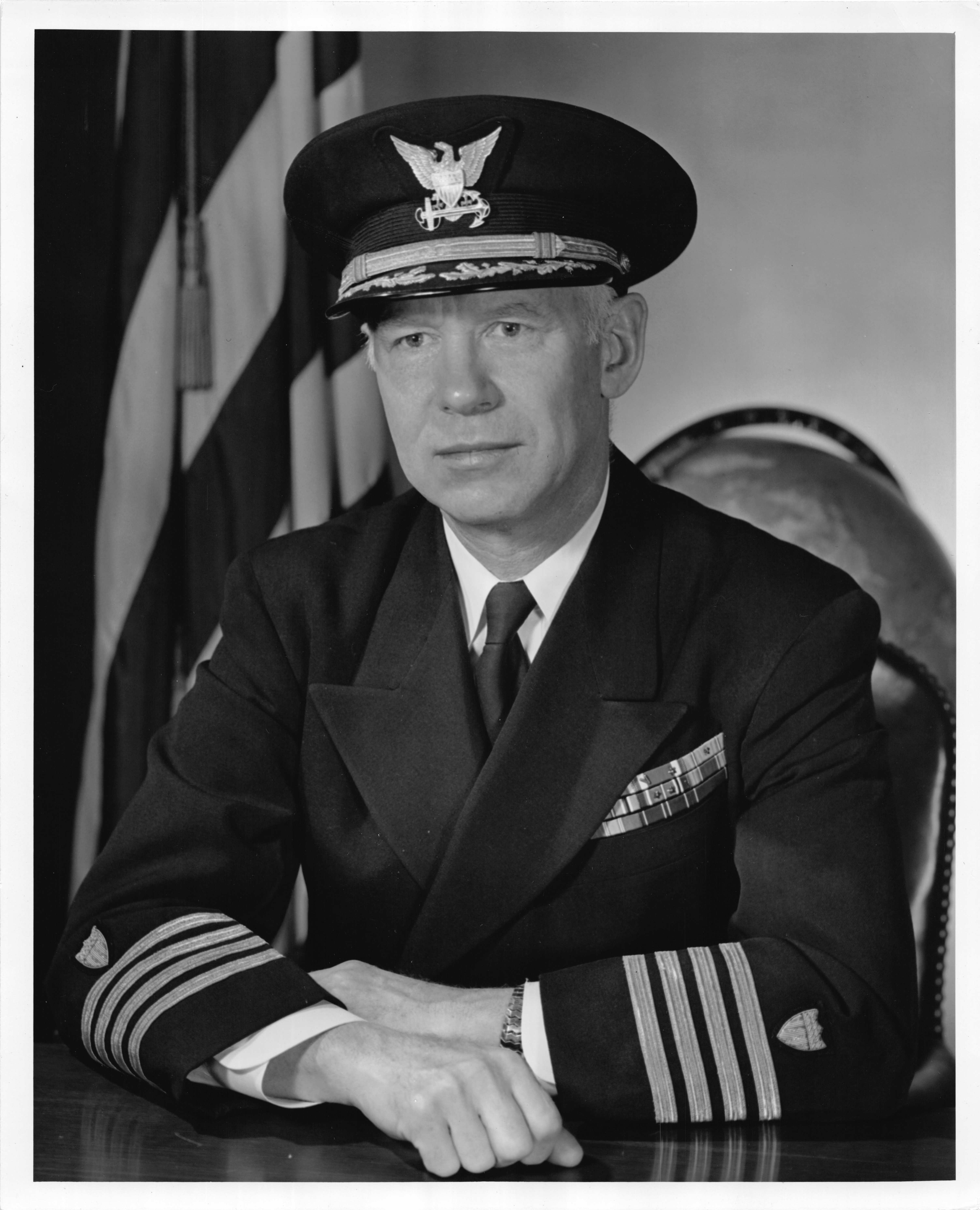
- Thomas in 1955
- Born: Charles ("Tommy") W. Thomas; September 3, 1903; Pasadena, California, United States
- Died: March 3, 1973 (aged 69); Ushuaia, Tierra del Fuego, Argentina
- Occupation: U.S. Coast Guard officer
- Spouse: Magnella Jensen (1903-1966) 1 child

Charles Ward "Tommy" Thomas (September 3, 1903 – March 3, 1973) was a flag officer in the United States Coast Guard and commanding officer of the icebreakers USCGC Northland (WPG-49) and USCGC Eastwind (WAGB-279) that served in the Greenland Patrol during World War II. In August 1945 he was appointed commander of Greenland Patrol. After the war he was commanding officer of USCGC Northwind (WAGB-282) during Operation Highjump; The United States Navy Antarctic Developments Project 1946–1947, also known as the Fourth Byrd Antarctic Expedition. Later followed expeditions in the Bering Sea.

In 1951, Thomas wrote about his adventures as an ice sailor in "Ice Is Where You Find It"

Rear Admiral Thomas appeared in the United States Navy documentary film The Secret Land, produced in 1948. The film won an Academy Award in its category in 1948.

Later in his career he rose to the rank of rear admiral.

== Personal life ==
Charles Ward Thomas was born in Pasadena, California 3 September 1903; he was graduated from Fairhaven High School in Bellingham, Washington and attended Western College of Education in the same city. He served nearly two years in the Washington National Guard.

During World War II he met a young Danish nurse, Miss Anna Magnella Jensen of Ivigtût, Greenland. The couple were married and had a daughter, Trina Anne Thomas, born in April 1952, and a son, Charles Ward Thomas, Jr, who served in the United States Army.

== U.S. Coast Guard Career ==
He was admitted to the United States Coast Guard Academy in New London, Connecticut and appointed as a cadet in July 1922. He was graduated from the United States Coast Guard Academy on 24 October 1924 and commissioned as ensign, United States Coast Guard. He was promoted to lieutenant (junior grade) on 24 October 1926 and to lieutenant on 24 October 1928. On 24 October 1932 he was promoted to lieutenant commander and to commander on 17 July 1942. On 1 June 1943 he was promoted to captain. While captaining the icebreaker Northland during the Second World War, Thomas with his crew braved the frozen waters above the Arctic Circle to land Allied troops in Northeast Greenland, inflicting severe damage on German installations there and later captured an armed German naval trawler. For this heroic service, Thomas was awarded the Legion of Merit. In 1947, Captain Thomas led the supply and command ships of Admirable Byrd's Antarctic Expedition. He retired as rear admiral 1 November 1957 in Washington state.

== U.S. Coast Guard Auxiliary ==
As a lieutenant commander of the USCGC Hermes (WPC-109), berthed in Watchorn Basin (part of Los Angeles Harbor) in 1934, Thomas met with Malcolm Stuart Boylan to discuss Boylan's request for a review of the Pacific Writers' Club fleet before a cruise to Catalina Island. In addition, Boylan presented his idea for a civilian Coast Guard Auxiliary to assist with keeping pleasure craft safe. Because Thomas could not do the review, he sent Lt. Francis C. Pollard in his place. So it was, ultimately, Pollard who helped Boylan set the idea for a Coast Guard Reserve and Auxiliary in motion after the 1934 cruise with the Pacific Writers' Club.

== Death ==
The retired rear admiral was killed by a speeding car as he was crossing a street while on holiday in Ushuaia, Tierra del Fuego, Argentina, on 3 March 1973. Thomas was sixty-nine years old at the time of his death. News of Thomas' untimely death was announced to the fleet by ADM Chester R. Bender, Commandant of the Coast Guard shortly thereafter. The Commandant noted "with deepest sorrow" the loss of a "true friend and shipmate", an "outstanding icebreaker sailor", and a "benevolent skipper".
