= The Broncho Twister =

1927 film

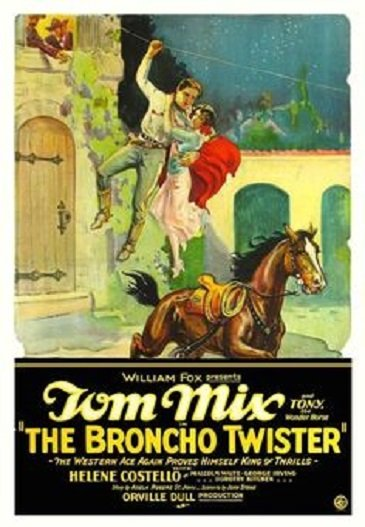
- Directed by: Orville O. Dull (Credited as Orville Dull)
- Written by: Adela Rogers St. Johns (Story); John Stone (Scenario)
- Produced by: Orville O. Dull (Credited as Orville Dull)
- Starring: Tom Mix
- Cinematography: Daniel B. Clark (As Dan Clark)
- Distributed by: Fox Film Corporation
- Release date: March 13, 1927
- Running time: 60 minutes
- Country: United States
- Languages: Silent film English intertitles

The Broncho Twister is 1927 American silent Western film starring Tom Mix. The film is lost.

== Cast ==
- Tom Mix as Tom Mason
- Tony the Horse as Tom's Horse (as Tony the Wonder Horse)
- Helene Costello as Paulita Brady
- Nancy Drexel as Daisy Mason (Credited as Dorothy Kitchen)
- Malcolm Waite as Dan Bell
- George Irving as Ned Mason
- Paul Nicholson as Black Jack Brady
- Doris Lloyd as Teresa Brady
- Jack Pennick as Jinx Johnson
- Otto Fries as Sheriff

== See also ==
- Tom Mix filmography
- 1937 Fox vault fire
