= USS Morgan County =

World War II United States Navy ship

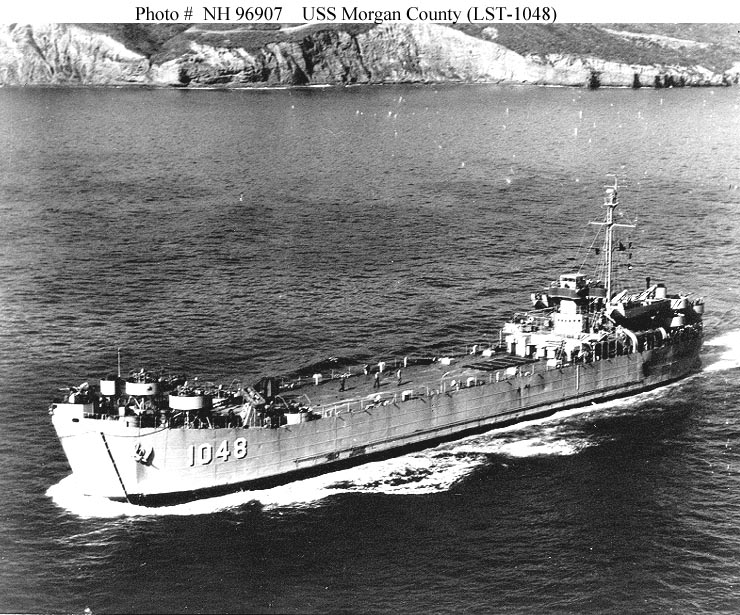
- USS Morgan County (LST-1048)

History

United States
- Name: USS LST-1048
- Builder: Dravo Corporation, Pittsburgh
- Laid down: 7 January 1945
- Launched: 17 February 1945
- Commissioned: 28 March 1945
- Decommissioned: 14 May 1946
- Recommissioned: 26 August 1950
- Decommissioned: 10 May 1956
- Renamed: USS Morgan County (LST-1048), 1 July 1955
- Stricken: 1 August 1959
- Honors and awards: 3 battle stars (Korea)
- Fate: Sold, 10 June 1960

General characteristics
- Class & type: LST-542-class tank landing ship
- Displacement: 1,625 long tons (1,651 t) light; 4,080 long tons (4,145 t) full
- Length: 328 ft (100 m)
- Beam: 50 ft (15 m)
- Draft: Unloaded : 2 ft 4 in (0.71 m) forward; 7 ft 6 in (2.29 m) aft; Loaded : 8 ft 2 in (2.49 m) forward; 14 ft 1 in (4.29 m) aft
- Propulsion: 2 × General Motors 12-567 diesel engines, two shafts, twin rudders
- Speed: 12 knots (22 km/h; 14 mph)
- Boats & landing craft carried: 2 × LCVPs
- Troops: 16 officers, 147 enlisted men
- Complement: 7 officers, 104 enlisted men
- Armament: 8 × 40 mm guns; 12 × 20 mm guns

USS Morgan County (LST-1048) was an LST-542-class tank landing ship built for the United States Navy in World War II. Like most ships of her class, she was originally known only by her designation, USS LST-1048, and, like all remaining LSTs, was named on 1 July 1955, after eleven counties in the U.S.

LST‑1048 was laid down on 7 January 1945 by the Dravo Corporation of Neville Island, Pennsylvania. Launched on 17 February 1945, sponsored by Mrs. L. P. Struble; she was placed in partial commission on 15 March 1945 for the cruise down the Mississippi River; and commissioned at New Orleans on 28 March 1945.

== Service history ==
=== World War II, 1945–1946 ===
After shakedown off Florida, LST‑1048 departed New Orleans on 1 May 1945 for Hawaii, arriving at Pearl Harbor on 3 June. She sailed to the Marshall Islands, where she transported ammunition between various bases for the next three months, before departing Saipan on 14 September with units of the 3rd Marine Division destined for duty in Japan.

LST‑1048 was decommissioned in Japan on 14 May 1946, and was turned over to the Army for the next five years to aid in the task of repatriation.

=== Korean War, 1950–1956 ===
Following the outbreak of hostilities in Korea, she returned to U.S. Navy service and was recommissioned at Yokosuka, Japan, on 26 August 1950, reaching Korea in time to play an important role in the Inchon invasion. She continued to operate in Korean waters into early 1951, before returning home, arriving at San Diego on 21 April. Her next western Pacific tour included a survey of the Marshalls for CINCPACFLT. She then returned to Japan, arriving Yokosuka on 26 April 1952, to resume cargo and transport operations in the war zone, in support of UN forces in Korea. In December she returned to the west coast.

During a 1953 run to supply stations in the Arctic region, she was beset in ice near Barter Island Alaska in the Beaufort Sea; and was freed by USCGC Northwind. On 19 October 1953 she sailed from San Diego, California for the Far East, where she participated in amphibious exercises, returning to the United States in May 1954. Following overhaul at Mare Island, she reported to her new base at Long Beach, California in June 1955. LST‑1048 was named USS Morgan County (LST-1048) on 1 July.

=== Decommissioning and sale ===
Morgan County was decommissioned on 10 May 1956, and was turned over to the Military Sea Transportation Service. She was struck from the Navy List on 1 August 1959, and sold on 10 June 1960 to Ships, Inc.

== Awards ==
LST‑1048 received three battle stars for Korean service.
