= Barbary Coast Gent =

1944 film by Roy Del Ruth

- Theatrical release poster
- Directed by: Roy Del Ruth
- Written by: William R. Lipman
- Produced by: Orville O. Dull; Harry Ruskin
- Starring: Wallace Beery
- Cinematography: Charles Salerno Jr.
- Edited by: Adrienne Fazan
- Music by: David Snell
- Production company: Metro-Goldwyn-Mayer
- Distributed by: Metro-Goldwyn-Mayer
- Release date: September 1944
- Running time: 87 minutes
- Country: United States
- Language: English

Barbary Coast Gent is a 1944 American Western comedy film set in the 1880s starring Wallace Beery. The movie was directed by Roy Del Ruth and features Binnie Barnes, Beery's brother Noah Beery, Sr., John Carradine, and Chill Wills. The film is also known as Gold Town, Honest Plush Brannon and The Honest Thief.

== Plot ==
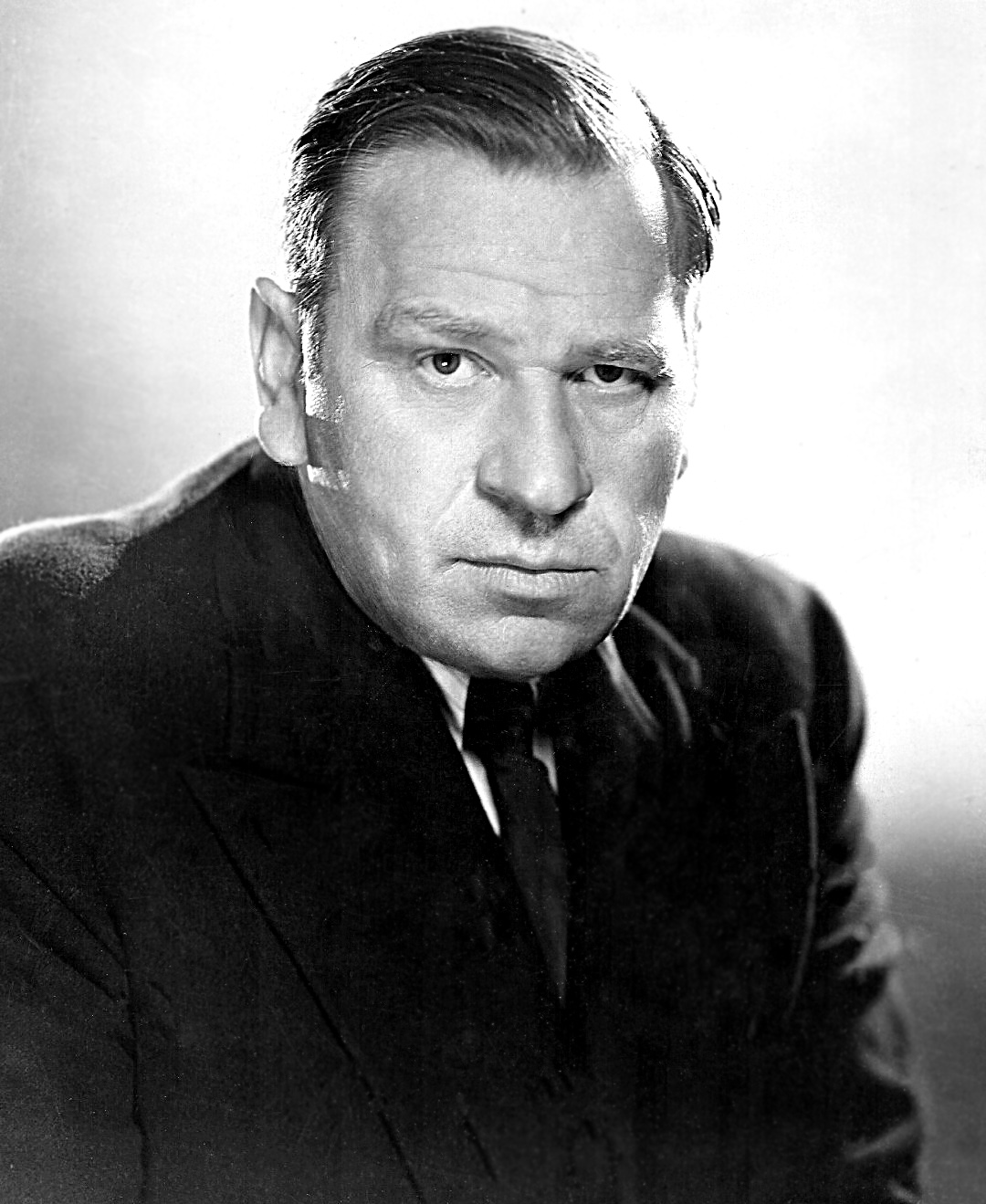
Wallace Beery as Honest Plush Brannon

Honest Plush Brannon is a scam artist living in the Barbary Coast district of San Francisco, California. He is engaged to Li'l Damish, a saloon owner. However, Plush needs to make some money to prove to her that he can support himself. However, he is confronted by his former accomplice, Duke Cleat, who accuses Plush of previously cheating him.

During their confrontation, Plush shoots and wounds Duke. Plush tells the police it was in self defense; they tell him to get out of town. Plush boards a train to Denver, Colorado. Aboard the train, he makes himself comfortable in a plush drawing room car that belongs to Bradford Bellamy I.

When Bellamy discovers Plush, he is ready to have him ejected from the train at a stop in Nevada. However, he is distracted by a telegram from the Civic Committee of Gold Town, Nevada. His grandson, Bradford Bellamy III, resides there and is engaged to Portia Adair, against his grandfather's wishes. Now the committee wants the elder Bellamy to deliver a speech. Overhearing this, Plush offers to go to Gold Town and make the speech, posing as Bellamy's financial advisor. The older man agrees. To derail his grandson's engagement, the older Bellamy gives Plush a fake letter to give to the newspaper in Gold Town. It states that the younger Bellamy is engaged to a debutante on the East Coast.

Plush arrives in Gold Town to a warm welcome. He spots an old criminal accomplice, Johnny Adair; the two men used to rob stagecoaches together. Now an honest stagecoach driver, Adair no longer recognizes Plush. As it turns out, Portia is Adair's daughter. When Plush finally meets the young man, he realizes that Plush is an imposter, However, when Plush gives Bellamy the fake letter, the later is grateful and does not reveal Plush's true identity.

The next day, Plush is dedicating a cornerstone in the city. As he ceremoniously hits the cornerstone with a mallet, he chips off a small corner. Plush notices that the stone chip contains traces of gold. He pockets the chip and continues the ceremony. Plush stakes a claim for the property where the cornerstone was mined and sets up a mining company. Everyone wants to invest in it and Plush now has thousands of dollars.

Back in San Francisco, Duke learns about Plush's new wealth. Arriving in Gold Town, he robs Plush of all his money and then returns to San Francisco. Poor again, Plush returns to stage robbing. After robbing a Wells Fargo payroll stagecoach, he leaves a poem at the crime scene. After several more robberies with poems left behind, the locals dub the unknown bandit as"Jingle Bill". Meantime, Plush uses his money to start digging for gold at his mine and finally uncovers a vein of it.

Wells Fargo send detective Alec Veeder to Gold Town to capture Jingle Bill. He quickly notices that the outlaw has never robbed the stagecoach driven by Adair. To protect his friend from suspicion, Plush stages a robbery of Adair's stagecoach. However, Adair shoots and wounds Plush, who manages to escape. Later on in town, Adair sees blood dripping from Plush's sleeve and realizes he is the bandit. However, he says nothing about it.

Li'l then arrives in Gold Town. She tells Plush that Duke knows about the stagecoach robberies. Duke stole a pile of Plush's poems from Li'l, planning to resume the robberies around Gold Town as Jingle Bill. Meanwhile, after the failed robbery of Adair's coach, Veeder now suspects Plush to be the bandit.

When Duke arrives in Gold Town, Plush meets him in the street. During the confrontation, Plush shoots Duke dead and is wounded again. Veeder then discovers the stolen poems on Duke's body and concludes that he is Jingle Bill. However, Plush confesses the crimes. After a trial, Plush is sentenced to one year in jail. At the end of the film, he waves goodbye to Li'l, Bellamy and Portia as he is escorted to the town jail.

== Cast ==
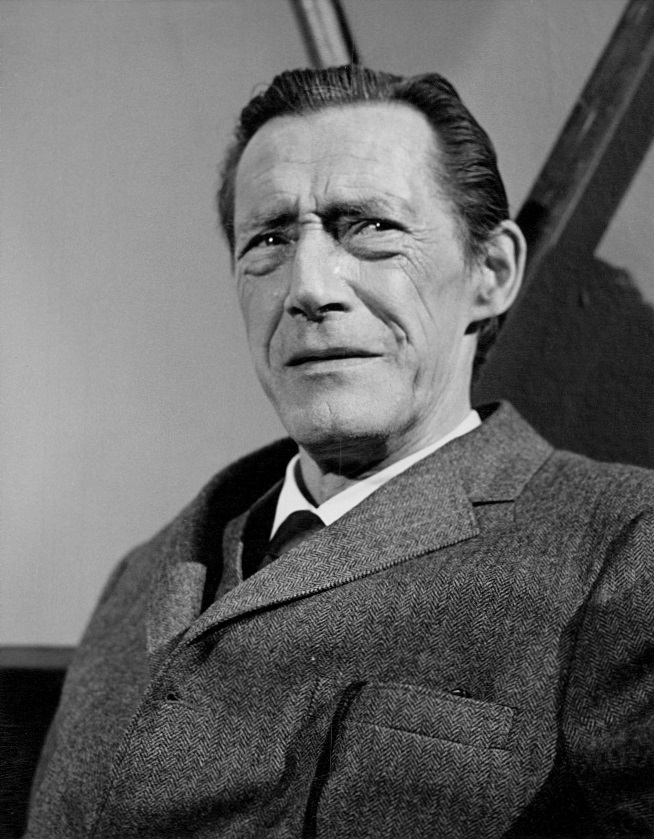
John Carradine as Duke Clete

- Wallace Beery as Honest Plush Brannon
- Binnie Barnes as Li'l Damish
- John Carradine as Duke Cleat
- Bruce Kellogg as Bradford Bellamy III
- Frances Rafferty as Portia Adair
- Chill Wills as Sheriff Hightower
- Noah Beery, Sr. as Pete Hanibal
- Henry O'Neill as Colonel Watrous
- Ray Collins as Johnny Adair
- Morris Ankrum as Alec Veeder
- Donald Meek as Bradford Bellamy I
