= Operation Highjump =

US Navy operation to establish an Antarctic research base

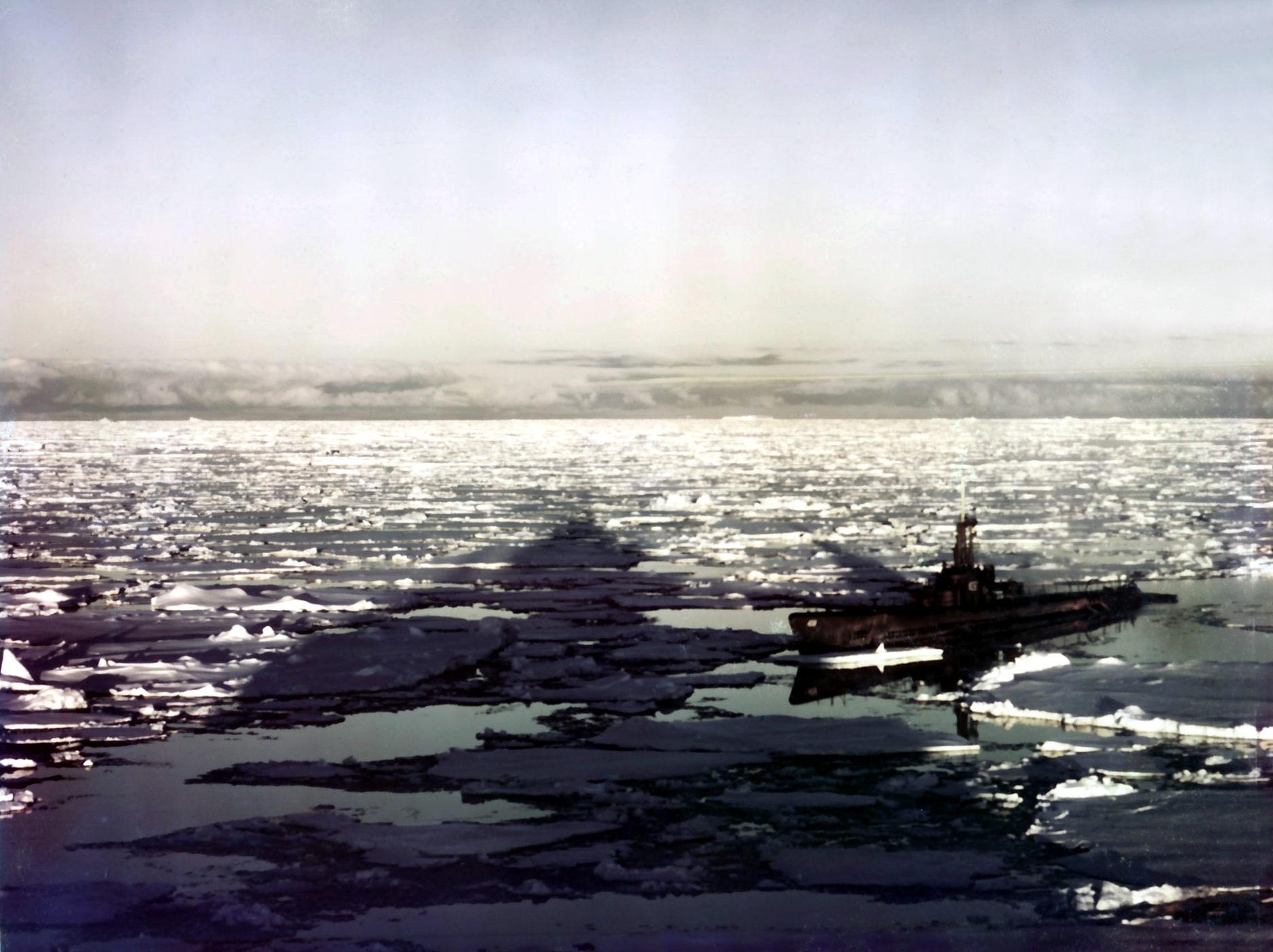
USS Sennet (right), a Balao-class submarine, participating in Operation Highjump

HIGHJUMP, officially titled The United States Navy Antarctic Developments Program, 1946–1947 (also called Task Force 68), was a United States Navy (USN) operation to establish the Antarctic research base Little America IV. The operation was organized by Rear Admiral Richard E. Byrd, Jr., USN, Officer in Charge, Task Force 68, and led by Rear Admiral Ethan Erik Larson, USN, Commanding Officer, Task Force 68. Operation HIGHJUMP commenced 26 August 1946 and ended in late February 1947. Task Force 68 included 4,700 men, 13 ships, and 33 aircraft.

== Operation objectives ==
Conceived as a fleet-scale, single-season trial of sustained polar operations, HIGHJUMP's mission was to establish Little America IV on the Ross Ice Shelf and to validate, under Antarctic conditions, the full logistics chain of ships, aircraft, and shore parties while generating large-scale aerial photography and hydrographic, meteorological, and related scientific data for charting and future base selection. The operation also addressed national-security requirements by testing high-latitude sterilized navigation, communications, and air operations relevant to polar approach routes, and by maintaining a United States presence in sectors where sovereignty claims might be advanced.

HIGHJUMP's stated objectives were:

1. Training personnel and evaluating ships, aircraft, vehicles, clothing, fuels, and maintenance procedures in Antarctic conditions
2. Determining the feasibility, costs, and risks of establishing, supplying, and operating permanent or seasonal bases in Antarctica, and identifying candidate sites
3. Developing and standardizing techniques for constructing, maintaining, and utilizing air bases on snow and shelf ice—including runway preparation, ski-equipped aircraft operations, and cold-weather servicing—with particular attention to later applicability in interior Greenland
4. Conducting wide-area photographic reconnaissance and mapping of coasts and inland ice, and expanding records in electromagnetic, geological, geographic, hydrographic, and meteorological fields
5. Consolidating and extending potential United States sovereignty over the largest practicable area of the Antarctic continent (publicly denied as a goal before the expedition ended)
6. Supplementary tasks associated with Operation Nanook (a smaller equivalent conducted off eastern Greenland)

== Timeline ==
The Western Group of ships reached the Marquesas Islands on December 12, 1946, whereupon the USS Henderson and USS Cacapon set up weather monitoring stations. By December 24, the USS Currituck had begun launching aircraft on reconnaissance missions.

The Eastern Group of ships reached Peter I Island in late December 1946.

On December 30, 1946, the Martin PBM-5 George 1 crashed on Thurston Island killing Ensign Maxwell A. Lopez, ARM1 Wendell K. Henderson, and ARM1 Frederick W. Williams. The other six crew members were rescued 13 days later. These and Vance N. Woodall, who died on January 21, 1947, were the only fatalities during Operation HIGHJUMP.

On January 1, 1947, Lieutenant Commander Thompson and Chief Petty Officer John Marion Dickison utilized "Jack Browne" masks and DESCO oxygen rebreathers to log the first dive by Americans under the Antarctic. Paul Siple was the senior U.S. War Department representative on the expedition. Siple was the same Eagle Scout who accompanied Byrd on the previous Byrd Antarctic expeditions.

The Central Group of ships reached the Bay of Whales on January 15, 1947, where they began construction of Little America IV.

Naval ships and personnel were withdrawn back to the United States in late February 1947, and the expedition was terminated due to the early approach of winter and worsening weather conditions.

Byrd discussed the lessons learned from the operation in an interview with Lee van Atta of International News Service held aboard the expedition's command ship, the USS Mount Olympus. The interview appeared in the Wednesday, March 5, 1947, edition of the Chilean newspaper El Mercurio and read in part as follows:

Admiral Richard E. Byrd warned today that the United States should adopt measures of protection against the possibility of an invasion of the country by hostile planes coming from the polar regions. The admiral explained that he was not trying to scare anyone, but the cruel reality is that in case of a new war, the United States could be attacked by planes flying over one or both poles. This statement was made as part of a recapitulation of his own polar experience, in an exclusive interview with International News Service. Talking about the recently completed expedition, Byrd said that the most important result of his observations and discoveries is the potential effect that they have in relation to the security of the United States. The fantastic speed with which the world is shrinking – recalled the admiral – is one of the most important lessons learned during his recent Antarctic exploration. I have to warn my compatriots that the time has ended when we were able to take refuge in our isolation and rely on the certainty that the distances, the oceans, and the poles were a guarantee of safety.

After the operation ended, a follow-up Operation Windmill returned to the area in order to provide ground-truthing to the aerial photography of HIGHJUMP from 1947 to 1948. Finn Ronne also financed a private operation to the same territory until 1948.

As with other U.S. Antarctic expeditions, interested persons were allowed to send letters with enclosed envelopes to the base, where commemorative cachets were added to their enclosures, which were then returned to the senders. These souvenir philatelic covers are readily available at low cost. It is estimated that at least 150,000 such envelopes were produced, though their final number may be considerably higher.

== Participating units ==
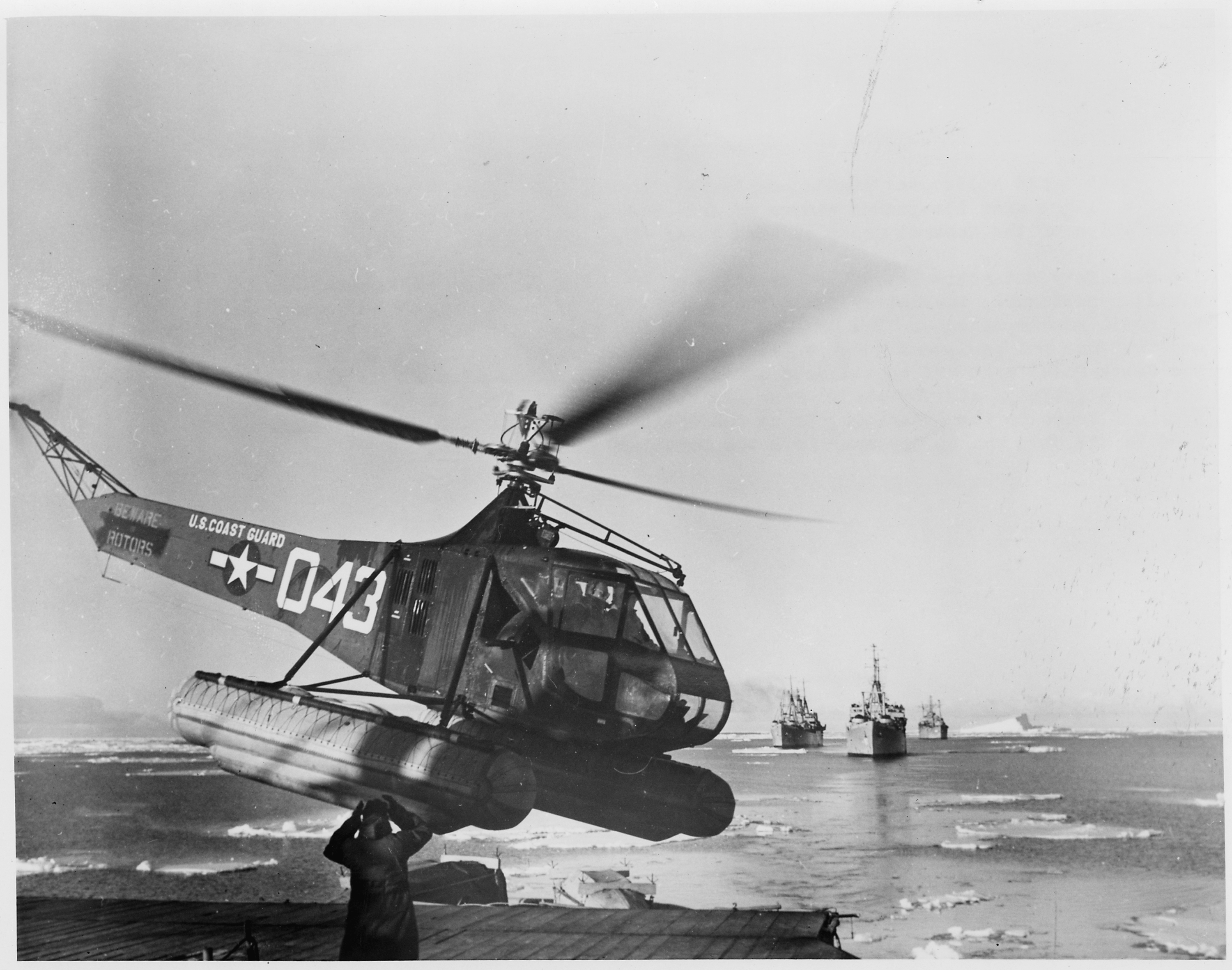
Sikorsky R-4 helicopter landing on icebreaker USCGC Northwind during Operation Highjump

Task Force 68

Rear Admiral Richard H. Cruzen, USN, Commanding

Eastern Group (Task Group 68.3)

Capt. George J. Dufek, USN, Commanding

- Seaplane Tender USS Pine Island. Capt. Henry H. Caldwell, USN, Commanding
- Destroyer USS Brownson. Cdr. H.M.S. Gimber, USN, Commanding
- Tanker USS Canisteo. Capt. Edward K. Walker, USN, Commanding

Western Group (Task Group 68.1)

Capt. Charles A. Bond, USN, Commanding

- Seaplane Tender USS Currituck. Capt. John E. Clark, USN, Commanding
- Destroyer USS Henderson. Capt. C.F. Bailey, USN, Commanding
- Tanker USS Cacapon. Capt. R.A. Mitchell, USN, Commanding

Central Group (Task Group 68.2)

Rear Admiral Richard H. Cruzen, USN, Commanding Officer

- Communications and Flagship USS Mount Olympus. Capt. R. R. Moore, USN, Commanding
- Supplyship USS Yancey. Capt. J.E. Cohn, USN, Commanding
- Supplyship USS Merrick. Capt. John J. Hourihan, USN, Commanding
- Submarine USS Sennet. Cdr. Joseph B. Icenhower, USN, Commanding
- Icebreaker USS Burton Island. CDR Gerald L. Ketchum, USN, Commanding
- Icebreaker USCGC Northwind. Capt. Charles W. Thomas, USCG, Commanding

Carrier Group (Task Group 68.4)

Rear Adm. Richard E. Byrd, Jr. USN, (Ret), Officer in Charge

- Aircraft carrier and flagship USS Philippine Sea. Capt. Delbert S. Cornwell, USN, Commanding

Base Group (Task Group 68.5)

Capt. Clifford M. Campbell, USN, Commanding

- Base Little America IV

=== Fatalities ===
On December 30, 1946, aviation radiomen Wendell K. Henderson, Fredrick W. Williams, and Ensign Maxwell A. Lopez were killed when their plane crashed (named George 1—a Martin PBM Mariner) during a blizzard. The surviving six crew members were rescued 13 days later, including aviation radioman James H. Robbins and co-pilot William Kearns. A plaque honoring the three killed crewmen was later erected at the McMurdo Station research base, and Mount Lopez on Thurston Island was named in honor of killed naval aviator Maxwell A. Lopez. In December 2004, an attempt was made to locate the remains of the plane. In 2007 a group called the George One Recovery Team was unsuccessful in trying to get direct military involvement and raise extensive funds from the United States Congress to try to find the bodies of the three men killed in the crash.

On January 21, 1947, Vance N. Woodall died during a "ship unloading accident". In a crew profile, deckman Edward Beardsley described his worst memory as "when Seaman Vance Woodall died on the Ross Ice Shelf under a piece of roller equipment designed to 'pave' the ice to build an airstrip."

== In media ==
The documentary about the expedition The Secret Land was filmed entirely by military photographers (both USN and US Army) and narrated by actors Robert Taylor, Robert Montgomery, and Van Heflin. It features Chief of Naval Operations Fleet Admiral Chester W. Nimitz in a scene where he is discussing Operation HIGHJUMP with admirals Byrd and Cruzen. The film re-enacted scenes of critical events, such as shipboard damage control and Admiral Byrd throwing items out of an airplane to lighten it to avoid crashing into a mountain. It won the 1948 Academy Award for Best Documentary Feature Film.

== See also ==
- List of Antarctic expeditions
- Military activity in the Antarctic
- New Swabia

== Bibliography ==
- Colin, Summerhayes; Beeching, Peter (2007). "Hitler's Antarctic base: the myth and the reality". Polar Record. 43 (1): 1. Bibcode:2007PoRec..43....1S. doi:10.1017/S003224740600578X. S2CID 27749390.
