= Orville O. Dull =

Director, Assistant Director, Producer and production Manager

- Born: April 25, 1888; Lima, Ohio, USA
- Died: December 29, 1978 (aged 90); Los Angeles, California, USA
- Other names: O.O. Dull; Orvid O. Dull
- Occupations: assistant director, producer, director and production manager
- Years active: 1916-1951

Orville O. Dull (born Orvid Oscar Dull, April 25, 1888 – December 29, 1978) was an American producer, director, production manager. and assistant director, occasionally credited as O. O. Dull.

== Career ==
Dull was born in Lima, Ohio and educated at Ohio State University. He appeared on stage in the early 1910s, and made his screen debut as an actor in Thomas H. Ince productions. After serving in the U. S. Army during World War I, he became an assistant director.

In the 1920s Dull held managerial posts with United Artists and Fox Film. He became a director for Fox's two-reel-comedy unit in 1926, first under his given name of Orvid O. Dull, then (for a few 1926 shorts) Bunny Dull, and finally Orville O. Dull, which he retained for the rest of his career. In 1929 and 1930, for United Artists, he supervised (and sometimes directed) classical-music shorts with orchestrations by Hugo Riesenfeld and live-action visuals conceived by William Cameron Menzies.

Dull was nominated during the 6th Academy Awards for the short-lived Best Assistant Director category. He joined Metro-Goldwyn-Mayer in 1936, working as general superintendent, production assistant, unit manager, and (in 1938-39) associate producer. In 1940 he became a full-fledged producer for MGM, as Orville O. Dull. He won an Oscar in 1948 for Best Documentary Feature: The Secret Land, showing a naval expedition to Antarctica. He worked on over 40 films from 1925 to 1951.

== Selected filmography ==
- The Secret Land (1948) (producer)
- Bad Bascomb (1946) (producer)
- Barbary Coast Gent (1944) (producer)
- Rationing (1944) (producer)
- The Man from Down Under (1943) (producer)
- Stand By for Action (1942) (producer)
- Tish (1942) (producer)
- We Were Dancing (1942) (producer)
- When Ladies Meet (1941) (producer)
- Edison, the Man (1940) (associate producer)
- Young Tom Edison (1940) (associate producer)
- Boys Town (1938) (uncredited associate producer)
- Vacation from Love (1938) (producer)
- Saratoga (1937) (uncredited assistant to producer)
- Abraham Lincoln (1930) (production manager - as O.O. Dull)
- Du Barry, Woman of Passion (1930) (production manager)
- The Lottery Bride (1930) (production manager - as O.O. Dull)
- Black Jack (1927) (producer and director - as Orville Dull)
- The Broncho Twister (1927) (director and producer - as Orville Dull)
- Car Shy (1927) (director - as Orville O. Dull)
- The Tennis Wizard (1926) (director - as Orvid O. Dull)
