= USCGC Northwind =

1945 Wind-class icebreaker

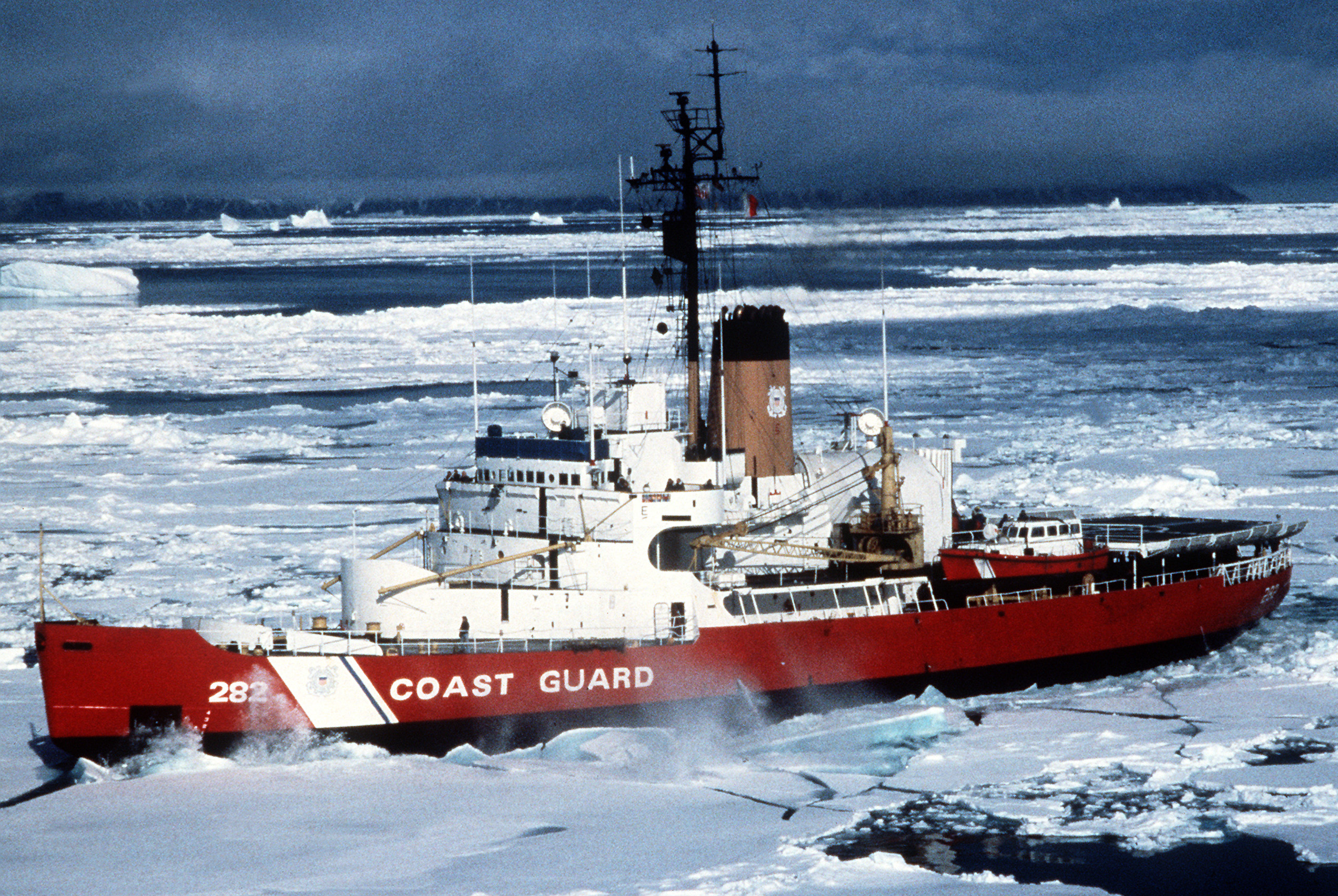
- USCGC Northwind in Baffin Bay on 10 July 1986.

History

United States
- Name: Northwind
- Builder: Western Pipe and Steel Company
- Yard number: CG-184
- Laid down: 10 July 1944
- Launched: 25 February 1945
- Sponsored by: Mrs. Mabelle C Dempwolf
- Commissioned: 28 July 1945
- Decommissioned: 20 January 1989
- Nickname(s): "The Grand Old Lady of the North"
- Fate: Scrapped in 1999
- Notes: Callsign: NRFJ

General characteristics
- Class & type: Wind-class icebreaker
- Displacement: 6,515 short tons (5,910 metric tons)
- Length: 269 ft (82 m)
- Beam: 63 ft 10 in (19.46 m)
- Draft: 29 ft 1 in (8.86 m)
- Ice class: Heavy (up to 13 ft (4.0 m) ice)
- Installed power: Diesel-electric: 6 × Fairbanks-Morse model 8-1/8OP, 10-cylinder opposed piston engines at 2,000 shp (1,500 kW), each driving a Westinghouse DC electric generator. (1944); 4 × Enterprise / deLaval engines. (1973)
- Propulsion: 2 × Westinghouse Electric DC electric motors driving the 2 aft propellers, 1 × 3,000 shp (2,200 kW) Westinghouse DC electric motor driving the detachable and seldom used bow propeller.
- Speed: 13.4 knots (24.8 km/h) top speed
- Range: 32,485 mi (52,280 km)
- Boats & landing craft carried: 4 lifeboats, 1 LCVP, 1 Arctic Survey Boat
- Complement: 219 officers and men
- Sensors & processing systems: Radar: SA-2, SL-1; Fire Control Radar: MK-26; Sonar: QCJ-8
- Armament: 4 × 5 in (127 mm)/38 cal deck guns; 12 × 40 mm/60 cal anti-aircraft guns; 6 × 20 mm/80 cal anti-aircraft guns; 2 × depth charge racks; 6 × K-gun projectors; 1 × Hedgehog anti-submarine mortar; 1 × M2 Browning machine gun; 1 × M60 Machine guns
- Aircraft carried: One fixed wing amphibious aircraft or two helicopters.
- Aviation facilities: Flight deck with retractable hangar. Two booms for lifting aircraft.
- Notes: Northwind sometimes carried one M29C Weasel.

USCGC Northwind (WAG/WAGB-282) was a Wind-class icebreaker, the second United States Coast Guard Cutter of her class to bear the name. She was built to replace USCGC Staten Island which was in Soviet lend-lease service.

During her career, Northwind conducted extensive oceanography, hydrography and cartography studies, as well as icebreaking, during Operation Nanook and Operation Highjump. Northwind was the last Wind-class icebreaker when she was decommissioned in Wilmington, North Carolina on 20 January 1989 after 44 years of service.

== Construction ==
Northwind was one of the icebreakers designed by Lieutenant Commander Edward Thiele of the United States Coast Guard and Gibbs & Cox of New York, who modeled them after plans for European icebreakers he obtained before the start of World War II. She was the fifth of seven completed ships of the Wind class of icebreakers operated by the United States Coast Guard. She was laid down on 20 July 1944 at Western Pipe and Steel Company shipyards in San Pedro, California, launched on 25 February 1945 and commissioned on 28 July 1945. Rear Admiral Ralph W. Dempwolf, Commander, 9th Coast Guard District presided over the ceremony with his wife, Mrs. Mabelle C. Dempwolf, serving as the sponsor.

Wind-class icebreakers had hulls of unprecedented strength and structural integrity, with a relatively short length in proportion to the great power developed, a cut away forefoot, rounded bottom, and fore, aft and side heeling tanks. Diesel electric machinery was chosen for its controllability and resistance to damage.

Northwind, along with the other Wind-class icebreakers, was heavily armed for an icebreaker due to her design being crafted during World War II. Her main battery consisted of two twin-mounted 5 in (127 mm)/38 caliber deck guns. Her anti-aircraft weaponry consisted of three quad-mounted Bofors 40 mm autocannons and six Oerlikon 20 mm autocannons. She also carried six K-gun depth charge projectors and a Hedgehog as anti-submarine weapons. After the war her aft 5-inch mount was replaced by a helicopter deck, sometime after 1964 the forward mount was removed.

== Service history ==
=== 1940s ===
==== Operation Nanook ====
Northwind's first major mission was Operation Nanook from 22 July–5 August 1946. The objective of Operation Nanook was to assist in a Danish-American project to establish a radio and weather station at Thule in North Star Bay, Greenland. This area later became Thule Air Force Base.

During July through September 1946 the first helicopter deployment from a Coast Guard icebreaker occurred an HNS-1 Sikorsky R-4 from Northwind off the Greenland coast. This deployment; in support of the International Ice Patrol, included the first helicopter landings at Thule, Greenland; Crozier Island and Winter Harbor, Melville Island. On 27 July 1946, Northwind was grounded on an uncharted pinnacle while entering Dundas Harbour, Devon Island, Nunavut but was refloated ten hours later without serious damage.

==== Operation Highjump ====
From December 1946 through January 1947 Northwind participated in Operation Highjump as part of Central Group (Task Group 68), under the command of Captain Charles W. Thomas, with one of the operation's primary missions being to establish the research base Little America IV. She was the only United States Coast Guard vessel to participate in the naval exercise and became the first U.S. Coast Guard cutter to cross the Antarctic Circle. She also completed the first major rescue missions of a submarine beset in ice when she twice broke out the damaged USS Sennet. Northwind also rescued USS Mount Olympus, USS Yancey, and USS Merrick which were beset and damaged in the ice floe at the Antarctic Circle. The first helicopter flight to base Little America IV from Northwind took place on 15 January 1947. Her crew played the first baseball game, the first double header (all without lights), and the first golf tournament in Antarctica.

==== First Bering Sea patrol ====
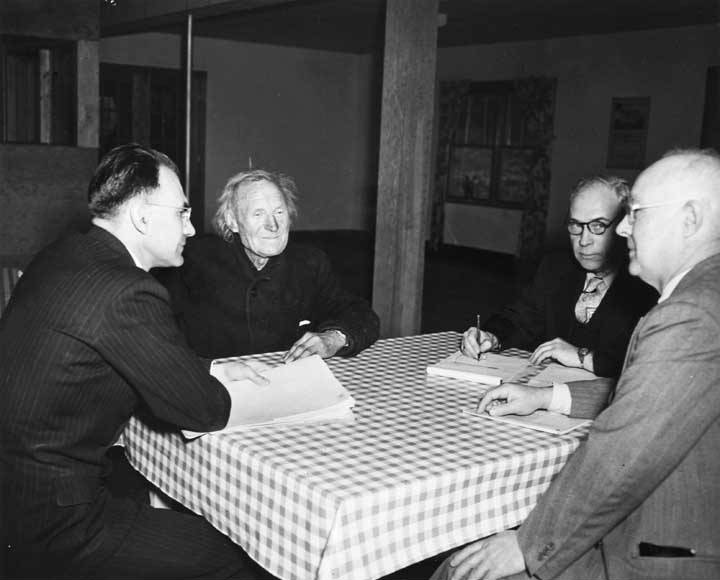
Judge Kehoe holding court in Homer, Alaska in 1948

During May to August 1948 Northwind conducted her first Bering Sea Patrol, the first in eight years, as the patrol had been suspended during World War II. She functioned as a "floating court" for a United States federal judge and staff, while U.S. Coast Guard medical personnel and United States Public Health Service officers on board provided medical and dental aid to hundreds of isolated Aleutian villagers. She also delivered and dispatched the U.S. Mail for remote Arctic outposts, lightships and lighthouses. She performed law enforcement, search and rescue, ice-escort for other ships and weather observation and reporting. Other duties of the Bering Sea Patrol were fishery monitoring, wildlife study, oceanographic and hydrographic research, re-supplying remote units, ethnological studies of the Aleuts, laying cables, and environmentally related missions. Northwind was a research platform for geophysical studies performed by scientists and students from universities in the Pacific Northwest, and California. In 1949 Northwind returned to the Arctic and in subsequent years served on several U.S. Navy expeditions to the region,

=== 1950s ===
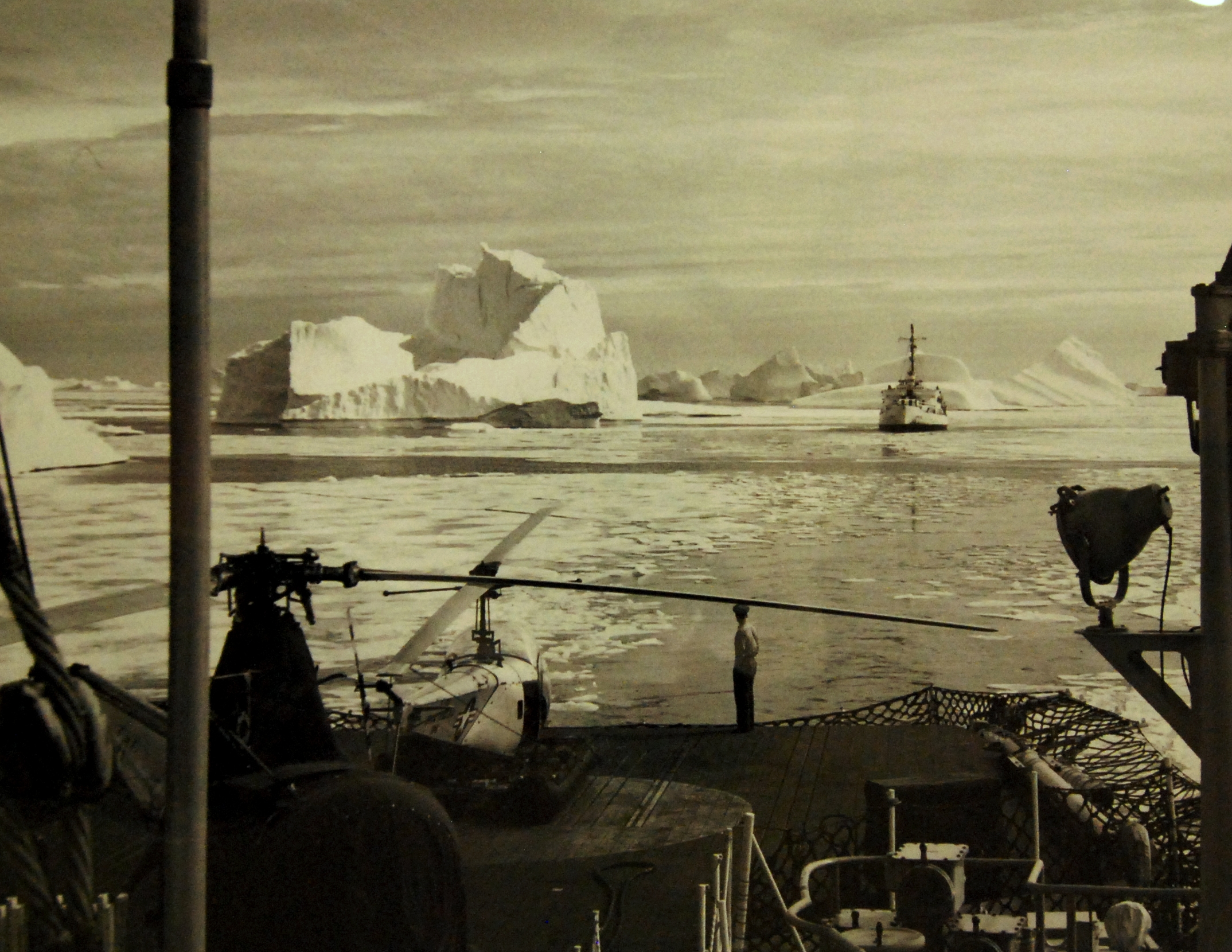
USCGC Northwind in distance during operations in Greenland fjord during 1952

In 1952 Northwind broke the polar icebreaking record for miles sailed north of the Arctic Circle in one season: 10,029 miles (16,140 km). She was the first ship to break through into Thule, Greenland, as early as 28 May 1952 although Thule is normally ice-locked until summer. During 1953 Northwind conducted a Bering Sea Patrol. During this patrol Northwind freed USS LST-1048 which was beset in the Beaufort Sea near Barter Island Alaska. USS LST-1048 was on a supply mission to support Distant Early Warning Line construction and was freed by ice-demolition.

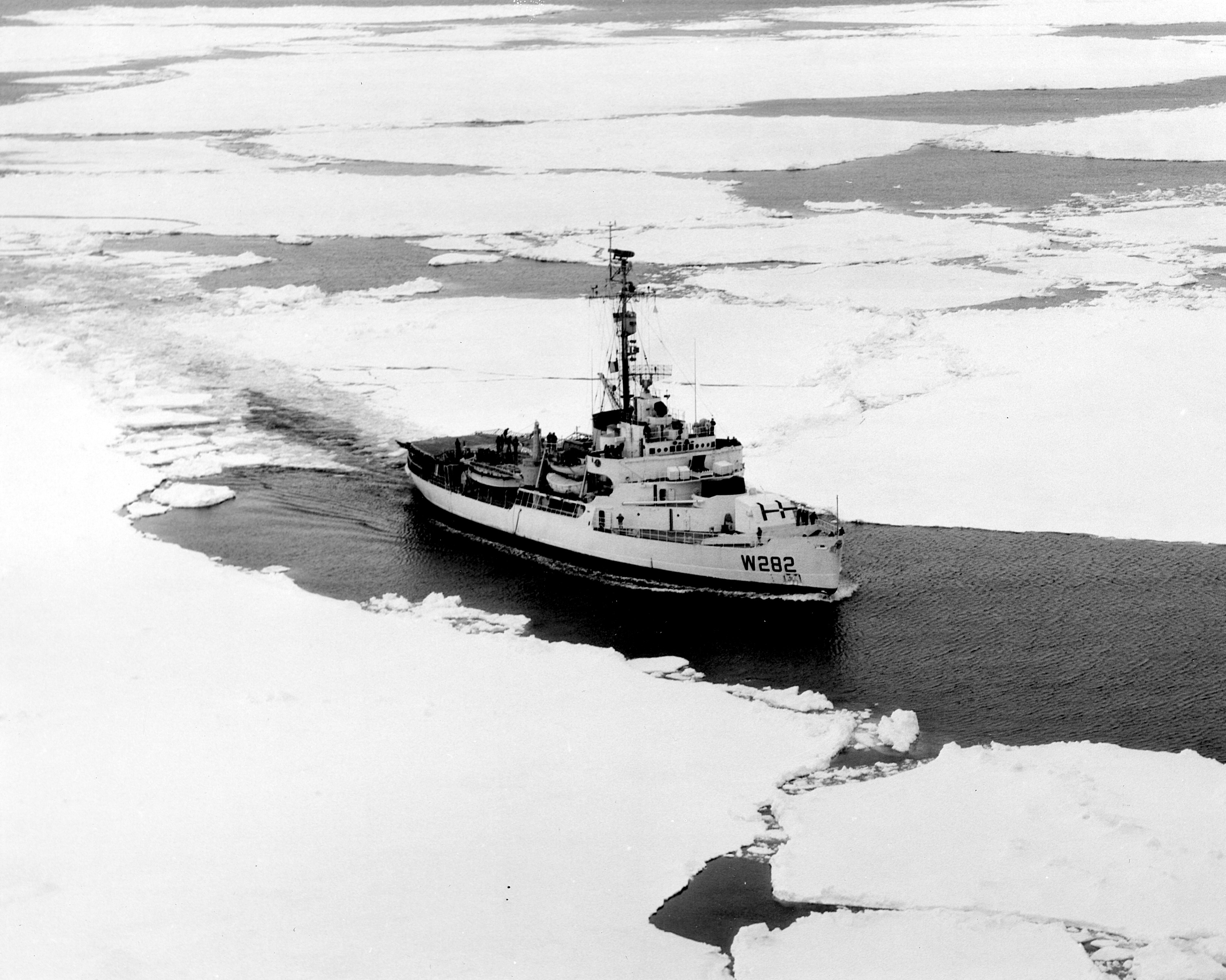
USCGC Northwind during Operation Deep Freeze in 1956

From 12 July to 29 September 1954 Northwind participated in the Canadian-U.S. Beaufort Sea Expedition. The mission was to perform an oceanographic and hydrographic surveys of the waters surrounding Banks Island. She was accompanied by HMCS Labrador and USS Burton Island. This cruise was the first where vessels transited McClure Strait and circumnavigated Banks Island. The transit was completed on 4 September 1954.

From February through April 1955 Northwind sailed on a Bering Sea scientific expedition in support of the U.S. Naval Hydrographic Office. During July through September 1955 Northwind supported Distant Early Warning Line operations. From November 1956 through April 1957 Northwind participated in Operation Deep Freeze II, in expeditions to Antarctica, providing clear passage for the cargo ships including USNS Private John Towle. On 20 January 1957 a small gathering of ship personnel, including Sir Edmund Hillary and Capt John Wiis, master of USNS Towle commemorated the opening of Scott's Base, Pram Point Antarctica. The expedition vessels were all part of Task Force 43, in the Antarctic. Northwind Glacier in Victoria Land was named after her. Northwind sailed again with U.S. Navy Task Force 43 on Operation Deep Freeze IV from December 1958 through February 1959. Northwind sailed to Wilkes Station in support of the U.S. National Committee and National Academy of Sciences during the International Geophysical Year 1957 to 1958.

=== 1960s ===
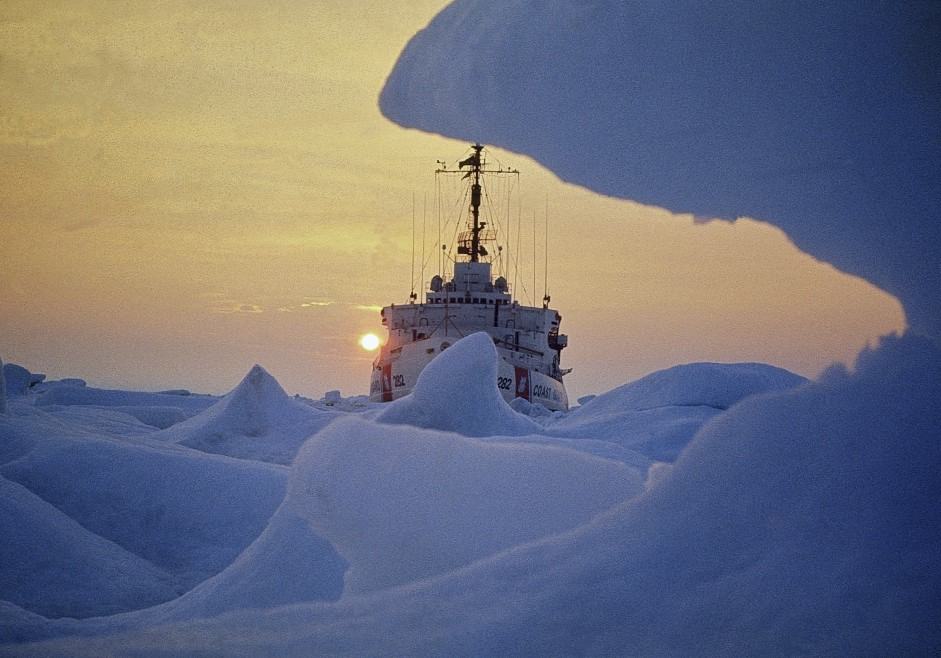
USCGC Northwind beset in the Beaufort Sea in 1969.

In 1961 Northwind sailed on Bering Sea Patrol for Arctic West Summer operations. From 5 through 25 July 1962 and 6 through 19 September 1962, Northwind conducted oceanographic experiments in the Chukchi Sea in cooperation with universities of the Pacific Northwest. From 2 through 26 October 1962, she conducted more oceanographic experiments in East Siberian Sea and Arctic Ocean. From 7 August to 18 September 1963, she conducted oceanographic experiments in the Chukchi Sea, East Siberian Sea, and Laptev Sea seas in cooperation with the University of Southern California, and was awarded the Coast Guard Unit Commendation with Operational Distinguishing Device. From July to October 1964, she conducted Bering Sea Patrol, resupplied Nome station and carried out oceanographic experiments in the Bering Strait and Chukchi Sea. The cutter's crew installed an unmanned oceanographic station in Fairway Rock, Alaska to measure currents in the Bering Strait. She also escorted ships re-supplying the Distant Early Warning Line and laid cables.

In July 1965, Northwind, under the command of Captain Kingdrel N. Ayers, conducted an oceanographic survey between Greenland, Iceland, and Scotland and was the first western vessel to operate in the Kara Sea of the Soviet Union, for which she received the Coast Guard Unit Commendation with Operational Distinguishing Device. The (then) classified mission of Northwind was to attempt a transit of the Northeast Passage. This voyage involved transiting the Panama Canal. The effort was not successful and caused a diplomatic incident between the Soviet Union and the United States.

In mid-October 1965 Northwind escorted the disabled Swedish MV Orion in the North Atlantic, while in 40-foot (12 m) seas, to the Gulf of Saint Lawrence, Canada. In 1966 Northwind returned to Fairway Rock and the crew helped install a strontium-90 radioisotope thermoelectric generator and additional oceanographic sensors. Northwind then cruised the Laptev Sea and East Siberian Sea doing oceanographic surveys.

From July through August 1967, Northwind conducted a current and hydrographic survey in the Bering Strait and resupplied Fairway Rock.

During this Bering Sea Patrol, on 23 July 1967, Northwind diverted to respond to the distress call of Canadian Survey Ship (CSS) Richardson of the Canadian Hydrographic Service and was assisted by CCGS Camsell. Richardson was beset in ice 5 miles (8.0 km) northwest of Point Barrow, Alaska; heavily damaged and in imminent danger of loss. As Northwind broke out Richardson, Camsell took the tow and she was taken to Tuktoyaktuk, Northwest Territories for repair.

From September to November 1967, Northwind was beset by ice 450 miles (720 km) north-northwest of Point Barrow, Alaska. She was freed by CCGS John A. Macdonald, USCGC Glacier, and USCGC Staten Island. During this cruise Northwind made the northernmost penetration into Arctic pack ice by any surface vessel in history at the time. This mission was the last attempt to resupply T-3, also known as Fletcher's Ice Island station by Northwind with Glacier, John A. Macdonald and Staten Island.

Between March and September 1968, she provided ice escort for the National Science Foundation research vessel RV Alpha Helix, then operated by the Scripps Institute of Oceanography at La Jolla, California. This operation was conducted in the Bering Sea. From 9 June to 15 July 1969 Northwind conducted an oceanographic survey in the Chukchi Sea and Bering Sea, with Staten Island, and scientists from the University of Alaska Fairbanks and the University of Washington. On 26 June 1969 Northwind resupplied Fairway Rock.

From 8 through 22 September 1969, Northwind, Captain Donald J. McCann, USCG, Commanding, and the Canadian icebreaker John A. Macdonald escorted the supertanker SS Manhattan, of the Humble Oil and Refining Company, from Resolute Bay, Canada to Prudhoe Bay, Alaska where she was relieved by Staten Island on transit of the Northwest Passage. CCGS Louis S. St-Laurent provided support during the eastward leg of the expedition. During the expedition Northwind lost a main engine bearing and the Engineer Division made repairs while underway, and went on to complete the Northwest Passage transit. Then, Northwind tested ice and returned to Seattle, Washington having transited 14,000 miles (23,000 km) and became the first surface vessel to conduct both a West to East and East to West transit of the Northwest Passage in a single season.

=== 1970s ===
From 20 January through 9 April 1970 Northwind conducted an Eastern Arctic patrol and oceanographic cruise. The cutter's northernmost penetration into the Arctic pack ice was at 66.35°N 167.29°W on 13 March 1970. This broke her 1967 surface vessel record by 9 miles (14 km), and set a new record. From 23 June through 28 September 1970 Northwind served on Arctic Operations. Her duties included laying cables, oceanographic studies, and re-supplying the Distant Early Warning Line. On 13 July 1970 Northwind rescued two crewmen from a ditched helicopter near the Yukon-Kuskokwim Delta in Norton Sound.

With the discovery of oil on the North Slope of Alaska in 1971; Northwind surveyed the area, constructed aids to navigation for the North Slope and conducted ice research that year during Arctic West Summer. She also broke out an icebound convoy of twenty tugboats and forty barges en route to Prudhoe Bay, Alaska in 1971. From 1971 to 1972 Northwind sailed on Operation Deep Freeze to the Antarctic. She was once again in the Antarctic for Operation Deep Freeze from 1972 to 1973. During June and July 1973 Northwind conducted oceanographic research in Alaskan waters. On 1 January 1974 Venzke Glacier in Antarctica was named for Captain N.C. Venzke, USCG; who commanded Northwind from 1971 to 1973.

From 1973 to 1975 Northwind underwent extensive machinery modernization and electronic modification at the U.S. Coast Guard Yard at Curtis Bay, Maryland and was stationed in Baltimore, Maryland. During the summer of 1975, Northwind conducted an Arctic East Summer cruise. From mid-February 1976 until mid-April 1976 Northwind conducted an Arctic Winter East (AWE) cruise in Baffin Bay between Greenland and Canada. From 6 October 1976 to 13 April 1977 Northwind broke ice during Operation Deep Freeze with Task Force 99 in Antarctica. From 13 to 18 September 1977 Northwind assisted USCGC Dallas in patrolling the America's Cup race at Newport, Rhode Island. On 2 November 1977 Northwind was still stationed in Baltimore, Maryland.

From late December 1977 until April 1978 Northwind participated in icebreaking operations on the Great Lakes to enable ore ships to continue their runs from Minnesota to lower Lake Ports. From 10 July to 10 December 1978 Northwind undertook an Arctic West Summer (AWS) cruise. From 3 November 1979 until 24 March 1980 Northwind joined in Operation Deep Freeze to the Antarctic. From 1978 to 1989 Northwind was stationed at Wilmington, North Carolina and did icebreaking in the Great Lakes.

=== 1980s ===
In August 1980 Northwind sailed on Arctic East Summer (AES). From 26 September 1981 to 13 December 1981 Northwind made a cruise to the Arctic. During April and May 1983 Northwind participated in the joint U.S. forces exercise Operation Solid Shield off the Atlantic coast where she performed simulated mine countermeasure operations. On 16 February 1984 Northwind accomplished the MEDEVAC of a woman from a 33-foot (10 m) sailing vessel 200 miles (320 km) west of Bermuda. On 5 August 1984 Northwind assisted a personal craft off Kulusuk, Greenland.

On 4 November 1984 Northwind seized P/C Alexi I, 240 miles (390 km) southwest of Jamaica carrying 20 short tons (18 metric tons) of marijuana. Northwind was participating in Operation Wagonwheel Forces an inter-agency narcotics interdiction effort in the Caribbean from 31 October to 31 November 1984. She became the first icebreaker to make a narcotics seizure and broke the previous tonnage record set by USCGC Sherman. This was a marijuana seizure record (for an icebreaker) that stands as of 2015.

From 2 to 21 July 1986 Northwind assisted the Danish and Greenland governments in reestablishing a musk-ox herd in northwest Greenland.

In January 1988 Northwind was drydocked in Norfolk, Virginia. The last mission of Northwind was an Arctic East Summer (AES) 1988 cruise, the Coordinated Eastern Arctic Experiment (CEAREX). Her role was to serve as ice-escort for the Norwegian research vessel, RV Polarbjørn. Northwind broke ice in the Norwegian and Greenland Seas, northward to the Svalbard archipelago of Norway from September 1988 through October 1988. Northwind then returned to homeport in Wilmington, North Carolina, having steamed over 25,000 miles.

== Decommissioning ==
Northwind was decommissioned in Wilmington, North Carolina on 20 January 1989 and transferred to the James River Reserve Fleet in Virginia. She was the last remaining of the original seven U.S. built Wind-class icebreakers. Northwind was scrapped at International Shipbreakers, Port of Brownsville, Texas in 1999. The scrapping operation took nearly six months to complete.

== Awards ==
Northwind earned two Coast Guard Unit Commendations, both with Operational Distinguishing Devices, during oceanographic experiments in 1963 and 1965. She was awarded three Meritorious Unit Commendation with Operational Distinguishing Device for the periods of 14 December 1977 to 10 April 1978, 1 May 1983 to 6 May 1984 and 16 October 1984 to 26 October 1984. During deployments to Guantanamo Bay, Cuba for the periods of 15 October 1976 to 5 November 1976 and 1 March 1982 to 31 March 1982, she also received two Coast Guard E Ribbons.

Coast Guard Unit Commendation with Operational Distinguishing Device and 1 award star	Coast Guard Meritorious Unit Commendation with Operational Distinguishing Device and 2 award stars	Coast Guard E Ribbon with 1 award star
National Defense Service Medal with bronze star	Antarctica Service Medal	Coast Guard Arctic Service Medal

== Naming honors ==
List of undersea features and glaciers named after Northwind
Name	Alternate name(s) and notes	Location	Coordinates
Northwind Plain	(Northwind Abyssal Plain)	Arctic Ocean	76°0′N 161°0′W
Northwind Escarpment		Arctic Ocean	76°30′00″N 155°00′00″W
Northwind Ridge	(Northwind Seahigh) (Northwind Cordillera)	western Arctic Ocean	75°00′00″N 158°00′00″W
Northwind Shoal		Greenland Sea	79°07′00″N 15°30′00″W
Venzke Glacier	(USGS Antarctic ID: 15956. Decision year: 1 January 1974) CAPT. N.C. Venzke, USCG, C.O. 1971 to 1973	Antarctica, Marie Byrd Land, Getz Ice Shelf	75°0′S 134°24′W
Northwind Glacier	(USGS Antarctic ID: 10875. Decision year: 1 January 1962)	Antarctica, Convoy Range, Victoria Land	76°40′S 161°18′E
