= The Secret Land =

1948 film

- Film poster
- Written by: Harvey S. Haislip; William C. Park
- Produced by: Orville O. Dull
- Narrated by: Robert Montgomery; Robert Taylor; Van Heflin
- Cinematography: Navy, Marine Corps, Coast Guard and Army cameramen
- Edited by: Fredrick Y. Smith
- Music by: Bronislau Kaper
- Distributed by: Metro-Goldwyn-Mayer
- Release date: October 22, 1948
- Running time: 71 minutes
- Country: United States
- Language: English
- Budget: $216,000
- Box office: $576,000

The Secret Land is a feature-length 1948 documentary film about the United States Navy expedition code-named "Operation Highjump" to Antarctica in 1946. The film, which was shot entirely by USN and US Army military photographers, focuses on the mission to explore the polar region and evaluate its potential for military operations.

The Secret Land was narrated by actors Robert Taylor, Robert Montgomery, and Van Heflin, and produced by Orville O. Dull. It won the 1948 Oscar for Best Documentary Feature.

== Plot ==
The film re-enacts scenes from several critical moments during the operation, such as shipboard damage control and Rear Admiral Richard E. Byrd throwing items out of an airplane to lighten it to avoid crashing when one of its engines failed and the other began to falter under the excess load. Another scene features Chief of Naval Operations Fleet Admiral Chester W. Nimitz discussing Operation Highjump with admirals Richard E. Byrd and Richard H. Cruzen prior to their departure. Also depicted are the rescue of a crew of a crashed aircraft and the discovery of an Antarctic oasis of bare ground and ice-free fresh water lakes atop a thermal bulge deep inland.

== Cast ==
- Robert Montgomery as Narrator (voice) (as Comdr. Robert Montgomery, U.S.N.R.)
- Robert Taylor as Narrator (voice) (as Lt. Robert Taylor U.S.N.R.)
- Van Heflin as Narrator (voice) (as Lt. Van Heflin, A.A.F., Ret.)
- James Forrestal as Himself (as James V. Forrestal)
- Chester W. Nimitz as Himself
- Rear Admiral Richard E. Byrd as Himself (as Admiral Byrd)
- Richard H. Cruzen as Himself (as Admiral Cruzen)
- Robert S. Quackenbush as Himself (as Captain Quackenbush)
- George J. Dufek as Himself (as Captain George Dufek)
- Paul A. Siple as Himself (as Dr. Siple)
- Charles W. Thomas as Himself (as Captain Thomas)
- Richard E. Byrd as Himself
- Vernon D. Boyd as Himself (as Captain Boyd)
- Charles A. Bond as Himself (as Captain Bond)
- David E. Bunger as Himself (as Commander David E. Bunger)
- John E. Clark as Himself (as Captain Clark)

== Reception ==
The film earned $395,000 in the US and Canada and $181,000 elsewhere, resulting in a profit of $10,000.

== Awards ==
The Secret Land won the Best Documentary Feature oscar at the 21st Academy Awards in 1948.

== See also ==
- Survival film, about the film genre, with a list of related films
