= Fairway Rock =

Islet in the Bering Strait

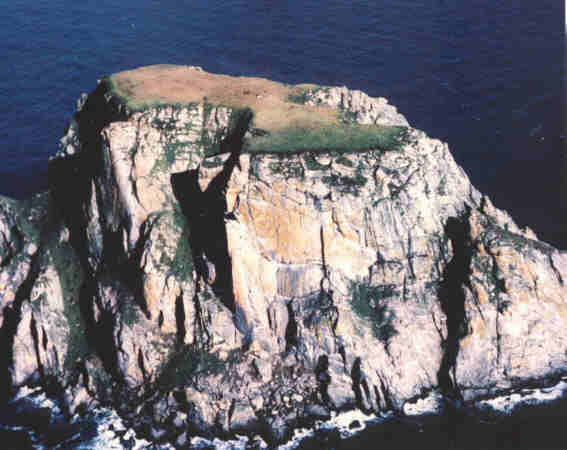
Fairway Rock in summer 1986

Fairway Rock (Inupiaq: Ugiiyaq) (Census block 1047, Nome, Alaska) is a small islet with mostly vertical rock faces in the Bering Strait, located southeast of the Diomede Islands and west of Alaska's Cape Prince of Wales. Part of Alaska, a U.S. state, the islet has an area of 0.3 km^{2} (0.12 mi^{2}). Known to Inuit of the Bering Strait region in prehistory, Fairway was documented by James Cook in 1778 and named by Frederick Beechey in 1826. Although uninhabited, the island is a nesting site for seabirds — most notably the least and crested auklet — which prompt egg-collecting visits from local indigenous peoples. The United States Navy placed radioisotope thermoelectric generator-powered environmental monitoring equipment on the island from the 1960s through the 1990s.

== Geography ==
The granite mass that is now Fairway Rock, like the larger nearby Diomede Islands, is the remnant of an earlier era of glaciation.

Fairway Rock is situated 12 mi (19 km) SSE of Little Diomede Island and 20 mi (32 km) W of Cape Prince of Wales, at 65°37′N 168°44′W. The island is variously reported as from 300 m (984 ft) to 1.5 km (0.93 mi) in length. Rising steeply from the surrounding waters to 534 ft (163 m) above sea level, Fairway Rock can be easily seen from the mainland coast of Alaska at Cape Prince of Wales. Because of its steep cliffs, it poses no additional maritime hazard. The Bering Strait around Fairway Rock is relatively shallow — about 50 m (164 ft) in depth — and oceanographic transects show the island to lie near a current velocity minimum for the strait. Ocean currents north of Fairway Rock are occasionally studied as an example of a real-world system where a Von Kármán vortex street is generated.

Fairway Rock lies inside Alaska's Nome Census Area and Alaska Department of Fish and Game Wildlife Conservation Unit 22E. It is conveyed to Inalik Native Corporation. Fairway Rock appears on United States Geological Survey topographic maps in the Teller Quadrangle.

== Flora and fauna ==
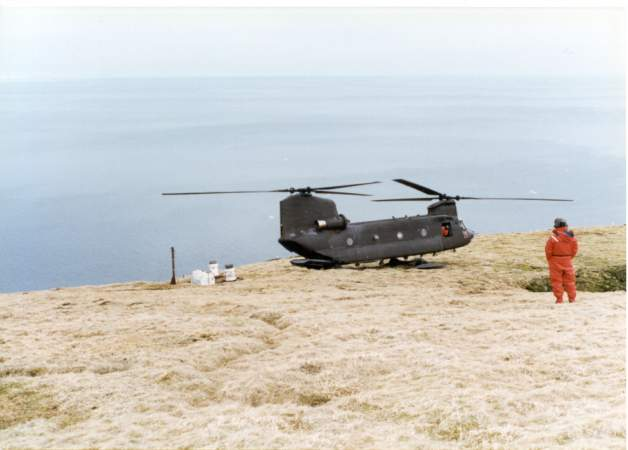
Sparse vegetation atop the granite island seen during a U.S. Navy visit to Fairway Rock

The island's bold cliffs are meant to be a haven for many migratory birds. However, the indigenous peoples who have lived nearby for thousands of years come to the island to take bird eggs in the spring and have continued to do so as recently as the 1990s.

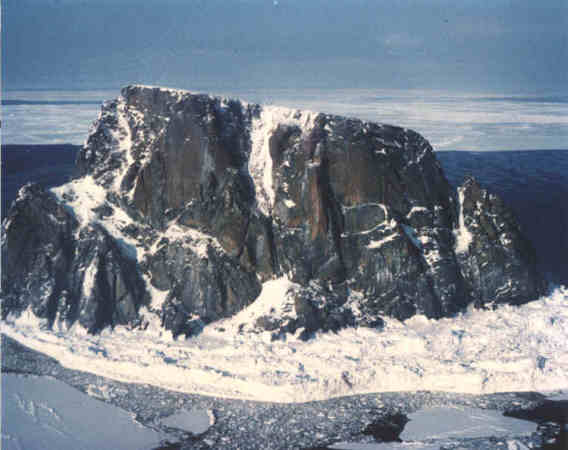
Fairway Rock during the spring of 1989.

The island supports a breeding colony of about 35,000 seabirds, including some 25,000 least auklets and crested auklets. In 1925, the tufted puffin (Fratercula cirrhata), horned puffin (Fratercula corniculata), parakeet auklets (Aethia psittacula), and Pallas' murre (Uria lomvia arra) were reported at Fairway Rock, nesting in the crevices of the island's cliffs. A 1960 account reports that Eskimo inhabitants of Little Diomede reported a glaucous gull (Larus hyperboreus) colony on Fairway Rock larger than that on Little Diomede.

The Steller sea lion may also breed on Fairway Rock.

== History ==
=== Discovery and establishment of outpost ===
For the sake of convenience, I named each of these islands. The eastern one I called Fairway Rock, as it is an excellent guide to the eastern channel, which is the widest and best.

— Capt. Frederick William Beechey, Narrative of a voyage to the Pacific and Beering's Strait to cooperate with the polar expeditions: performed in His Majesty's ship Blossom, pp. 337–338.

Fairway Rock was sighted by Captain James Cook on August 8, 1778. It was named by the English naval officer and geographer Frederick William Beechey upon sighting the island in July 1826. Unlike the names he gave to the Diomede Islands, the name "Fairway" has persisted.

Fairway Rock was passed and mentioned within the accounts of John Muir's voyage aboard the Corwin in 1881 and Roald Amundsen aboard the Gjøa in 1906.

What is considered the last offensive action of the American Civil War happened in this area: the CSS Shenandoah fell upon a fleet of whalers working the waters near Alaska's Little Diomede Island and sank more than two dozen ships on June 22, 1865. This is chronicled in the book The Last Shot.

In 1964, the U.S. Coast Guard icebreaker USCGC Northwind (WAGB-282) visited the rock, and installed an unmanned, propane-powered oceanographic station in order to measure water flows across the Bering Strait. Northwinds crew continued to help maintain the station until its closure.

=== The radioisotope thermoelectric generator ===
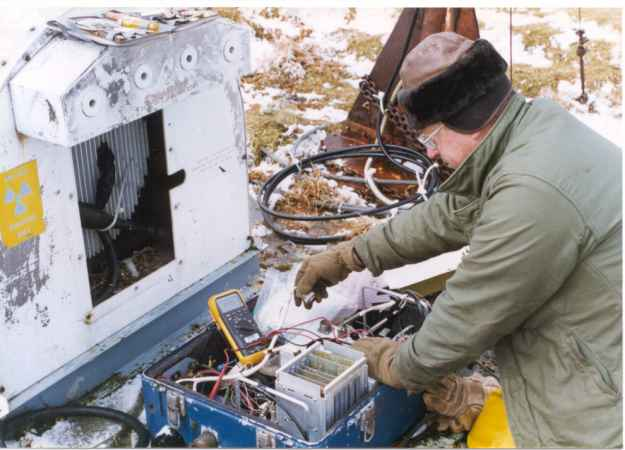
U.S. military perform maintenance on one of the radioisotope thermoelectric generators (RTG) left atop Fairway to power environmental monitoring equipment.

On August 11, 1966, the US Navy placed a strontium-powered radioisotope thermoelectric generator (RTG) atop Fairway Rock for "powering environmental instruments". At this time Commander John C. LeDoux was in charge of NavFac's shore based nuclear power program, whose over 200 trained men only had one power plant to run. With a new NavFac Chief taking over soon, Commander LeDoux feared the program might be cancelled if it had no other applications. In his memoir LeDoux writes that, "like good marketers we produced a catalog of what was available and sent it to all Navy commands." Within two weeks they received an urgent request for a generator at Fairway Rock.

Fairway Rock's then-current generator was propane-fueled and could not operate in the winter months. Since the generator powered "detectors on the ocean floor for submarine traffic heading North" it was considered essential that it be replaced rapidly. However, moving the new generator from Baltimore to Alaska to Fairway Rock would be a complicated process and LeDoux suspected that "red tape" would delay the operation for a long time.

LeDoux was able to use contacts in the AEC to get approval to move the generator in only four days, which he considered "a miracle in itself." A weekly Air Force flight to Vietnam was able to take it to Alaska. Getting the generator onto the island itself proved more difficult, since there were no Navy helicopters in the area. A bush pilot was contracted, two refueling locations were set up by the Army Corps of Engineers, and a Coast Guard escort (USCGC Northwind (WAGB-282)) was assigned, allowing the journey over the Bering Strait to be made safely. In the end, the project only took 10 days and "was done with no money or paperwork – mostly phone calls and personal visits." LeDoux was impressed that a project involving so many disparate military and non-military parties could be carried off in such a short span of time.

The device, developed by Martin Marietta, was the first commercially developed instrument of its kind deployed for unattended field use by the U.S. government. This use was cited in 1978 congressional hearings on potential uses for nuclear waste. In 1981 two additional RTGs were added. All three RTGs were removed from the rock in 1995 in a joint Army/Navy operation with Chinook helicopters from B Company, 4th Battalion, 123rd Aviation Regiment, the "Sugar Bears" of Fort Wainwright, AK. The three RTGs were transported from Fort Wainwright, AK to the Richland Consolidation Facility at Hanford Nuclear Reservation in Washington state for disposal.

== See also ==
- Rockall, a similar, even smaller rock island in the northern Atlantic Ocean
