= USS Merrick =

Cargo ship of the United States Navy

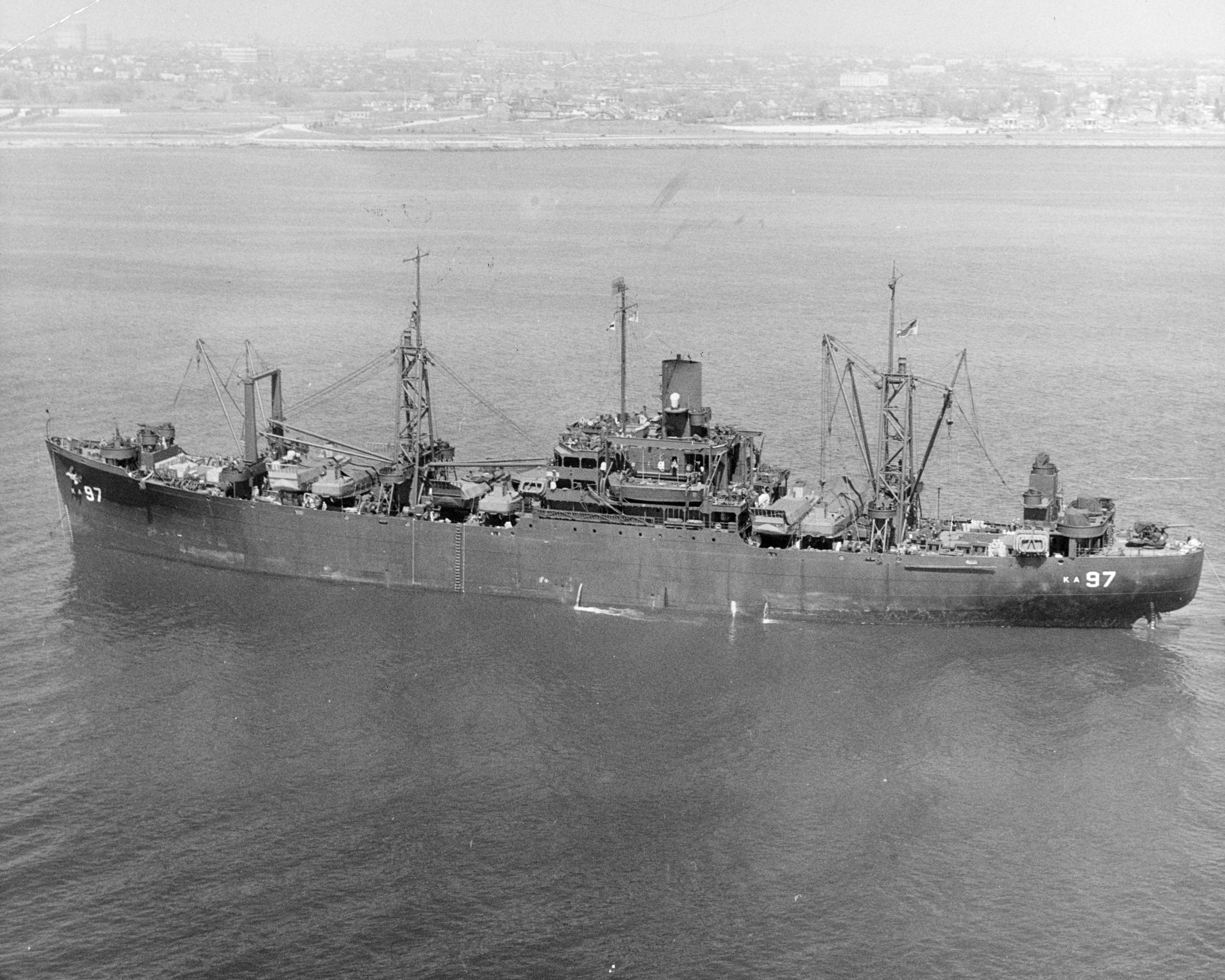
- Merrick on 10 April 1945

History

United States
- Name: USS Merrick
- Namesake: Merrick County, Nebraska
- Builder: Federal Shipbuilding and Drydock Company, Kearny, New Jersey
- Laid down: 19 October 1944
- Launched: 28 January 1945
- Commissioned: 31 March 1945
- Decommissioned: 26 June 1946
- Recommissioned: 19 January 1952
- Decommissioned: 17 September 1969
- Reclassified: LKA–97, 1 January 1969
- Fate: Scrapped in 1980

General characteristics
- Class & type: Andromeda-class attack cargo ship
- Type: Type C2-S-B1
- Displacement: 6,761 long tons (6,869 t)
- Length: 459 ft 2 in (139.95 m)
- Beam: 63 ft (19 m)
- Draft: 26 ft 4 in (8.03 m)
- Speed: 16.5 knots (30.6 km/h; 19.0 mph)
- Complement: 247
- Armament: 1 × 5"/38 caliber gun mount; 4 × twin 40 mm gun mounts

USS Merrick (AKA-97/LKA-97) was an Andromeda-class attack cargo ship named after Merrick County, Nebraska.

Merrick (AKA–97) was laid down as Maritime Commission hull 219, on 19 October 1944 by Federal Shipbuilding and Drydock Company, Kearny, New Jersey, launched on 28 January 1945, sponsored by Mrs. Francis N. Van Riper, acquired on 30 March and commissioned on 31 March 1945.

== Service history ==
=== 1945–1946 ===
Merrick left Norfolk on 15 May 1945 for training at Pearl Harbor and duty transporting cargo, landing craft, and troops among the Marshalls and New Hebrides until the close of World War II. She then carried occupation troops from the Hawaii and the Philippines to Japan and brought veterans, including Marine war dogs, back to Norfolk, arriving on 3 December.

After nine months of east coast operations, Merrick sailed in October 1946 with TG 68.1 for Port Hueneme, California, to load cargo for "Operation Highjump", the largest American Antarctic expedition at that time. She set course south on 5 December, and entered the Ross Sea on 31 December. The group reached the Bay of Whales on 15 January 1947 and there established Little America IV, the base for the expedition's significant scientific achievements.

Threatening ice conditions forced the retirement of the communications and supply ships on 8 February. Three days later Merrick's rudder suffered ice damage; USCGC Northwind (WAGB-282), a Coast Guard icebreaker, took her in tow, but before they had cleared the ice, her rudder was completely sheared off. The perilous tow ended at Dunedin, New Zealand, on 22 February. After repairs, Merrick departed for California on 22 March, battled boiler failures and fuel shortages during her passage, and reached San Francisco. Here she decommissioned on 25 June 1947 and entered the National Defense Reserve Fleet.

=== 1952–1969 ===
Berthed at Suisun Bay, California, until recommissioning on 19 January 1952 for service in the Korean War, Merrick reported at Yokosuka, Japan, on 2 July to carry cargo and men among the Japanese home islands until returning to California on 7 October for overhaul and training. Her second Far Eastern tour, on 3 July on 1953 to 22 April 1954, included two months in "Operation Big Switch", the post-armistice prisoner exchange. She carried more than 6,400 prisoners from Koje-do and Cheju-do to Inchon, then trained Army and Marine Corps troops in amphibious exercises in the Philippines and at Iwo Jima.

Through 1963, Merrick's annual deployments were with the 7th Fleet in the western Pacific, other than in 1955 and 1957, when she sailed to supply military and sealing stations in the Arctic.

As the Vietnam War intensified, Merrick served her first tour in the South China Sea in 1963, returning annually through 1969. Support for the forces of South Vietnam included troop lifts from Okinawa and the Philippines to South Vietnam as well as participation in landings at Huế and Chu Lai (1965) and on the Saigon River Delta (1966). The latter marked the Navy's first extension of amphibious combat capability on an inland waterway since the Civil War.

Between deployments she maintained her readiness through training and necessary overhauls on the west coast. She received seven campaign stars for service in Vietnam.

She was reclassified as LKA–97 (LKA being the designation for an Amphibious Cargo Ship) on 1 January 1969 and was decommissioned on 17 September 1969. Merrick was transferred to the Maritime Administration on 15 December 1969, for lay up in the National Defense Reserve Fleet, Suisun Bay Group, Benicia, California.

== Fate ==
Merrick was struck from the Naval Register on 1 September 1976 and withdrawn from reserve on 19 December 1979 for trade-in and exchange to States Marine Lines (as the SS Santa Ana).

She was delivered to Apolina Ltd., Hong Kong for disposal. She was scrapped by Fubian Steel Enterprises Corp., Taiwan, on 13 March 1980.

== Awards ==
Merrick was one of the most decorated cargo ships in the Navy's history. Her service included three wars, the quarantine of Cuba and Operation Highjump in the Antarctic.

- Combat Action Ribbon
- American Campaign Medal
- Asiatic-Pacific Campaign Medal
- World War II Victory Medal
- Navy Occupation Service Medal with "ASIA" clasp
- National Defense Service Medal (2 awards)
- Korean Service Medal
- Antarctic Service Medal
- Armed Forces Expeditionary Medal (3 awards)
- Vietnam Service Medal with six campaign stars
- Republic of Vietnam Gallantry Cross Unit Citation
- United Nations Service Medal
- Republic of Korea War Service Medal (retroactive)
- Republic of Vietnam Campaign Medal
