= Richard Evelyn Byrd (disambiguation) =

Richard Evelyn Byrd Jr. (1888–1957) was an American naval officer and polar explorer.

Richard Evelyn Byrd also refer to:

- Richard Evelyn Byrd Sr. (1860–1925), Virginia politician
- Richard Evelyn Byrd III (1920–1988), United States naval officer, son of the polar explorer
