= Byrd Canyon =

Undersea canyon in Antarctica

Byrd Canyon (75°30′S 157°15′W) is an undersea canyon off the Saunders Coast of the Marie Byrd Land region of Antarctica. It was named for Admiral Richard E. Byrd. The name was approved by the Advisory Committee for Undersea Features in June 1988.
