= Richard Evelyn Byrd III =

American Antarctic explorer

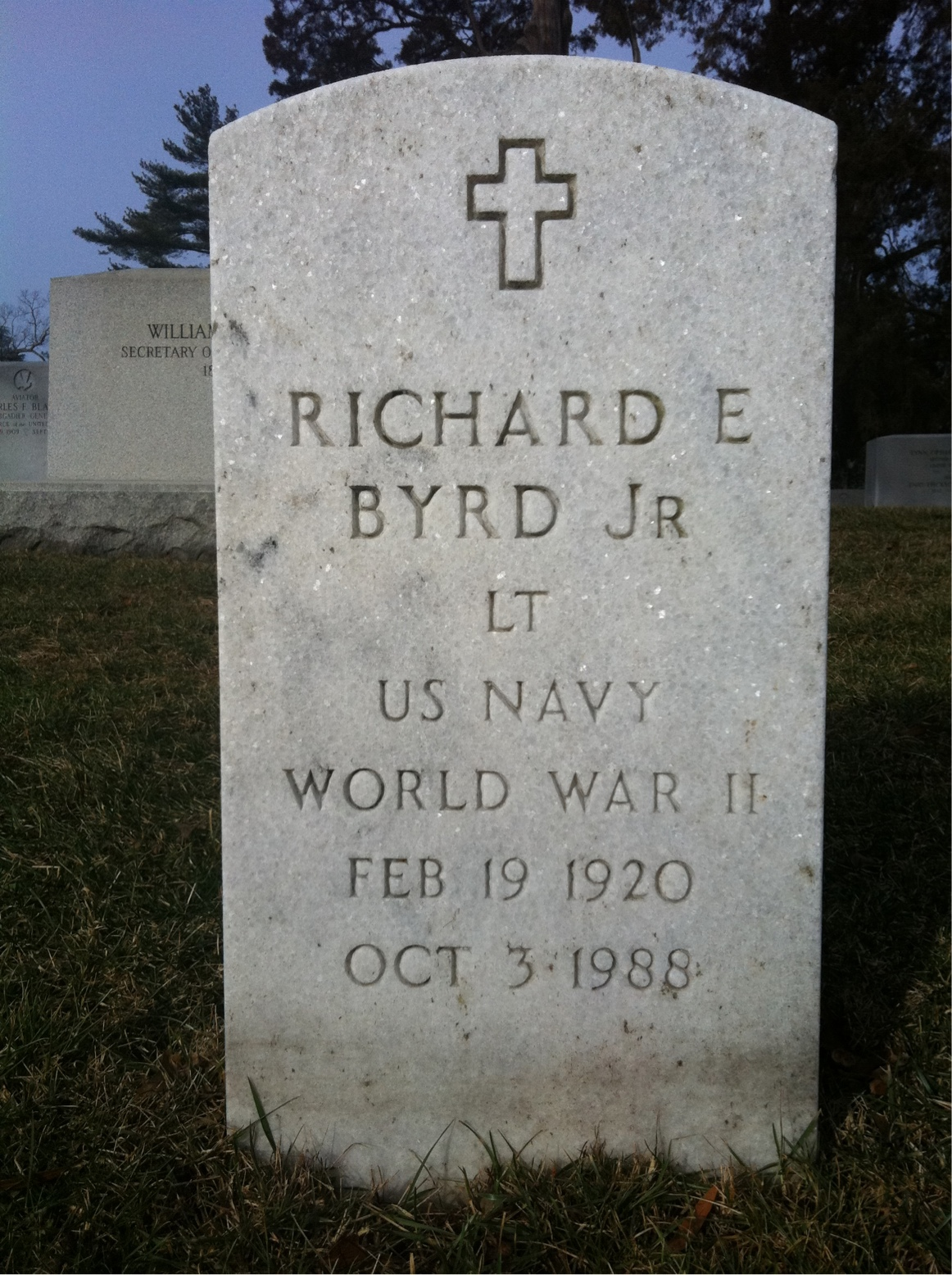
- Gravestone at Arlington National Cemetery
- Born: February 19, 1920; Boston, Massachusetts, United States
- Died: c. October 3, 1988 (aged 68); Baltimore, Maryland, United States
- Resting place: Arlington National Cemetery
- Occupations: Financial advisor, Naval officer
- Father: Richard E. Byrd

Richard Evelyn Byrd III (February 19, 1920 – c. October 3, 1988), usually referred to as Richard E. Byrd Jr., was a United States naval officer, Antarctic explorer, and the son of Admiral Richard Evelyn Byrd.

== Biography ==
=== Early life ===
Richard Evelyn Byrd III was born on February 19, 1920 to famed naval aviator and explorer Richard Evelyn Byrd Jr. and his wife, Marie Donaldson Ames. The younger Richard was a graduate of Milton Academy and Harvard College.

=== Military career ===
During World War II he was commissioned an ensign in the Naval Reserve on April 6, 1942, and was promoted to lieutenant (junior grade) on January 1, 1944. He was promoted to lieutenant by the war's end and was promoted to the rank of lieutenant commander in the Naval Reserve after the war. He accompanied his father on Operation Highjump to explore Antarctica in 1946.

=== Personal life ===
In 1948, he married Emily Saltonstall (d. 2006), the daughter of longtime Massachusetts Senator Leverett Saltonstall. They divorced in 1960, with Byrd losing custody of their four sons. He had five children and six grandchildren. He worked as a financial advisor with Morgan Stanley.

=== Death ===
He died on or about October 3, 1988, at the age of 68. His body was found in a warehouse in Baltimore, Maryland. He had gone missing on September 13, 1988, after being placed on a train in Boston bound for Washington, D.C. Byrd was supposed to attend a National Geographic Society event honoring the 100th anniversary of his father's birth, but never arrived.

The cause of his death was dehydration and malnutrition which resulted from Alzheimer's disease. He was buried near his father in Arlington National Cemetery.

== See also ==
- Lists of solved missing person cases
