= Richard E. Byrd =

American naval officer (1888–1957)

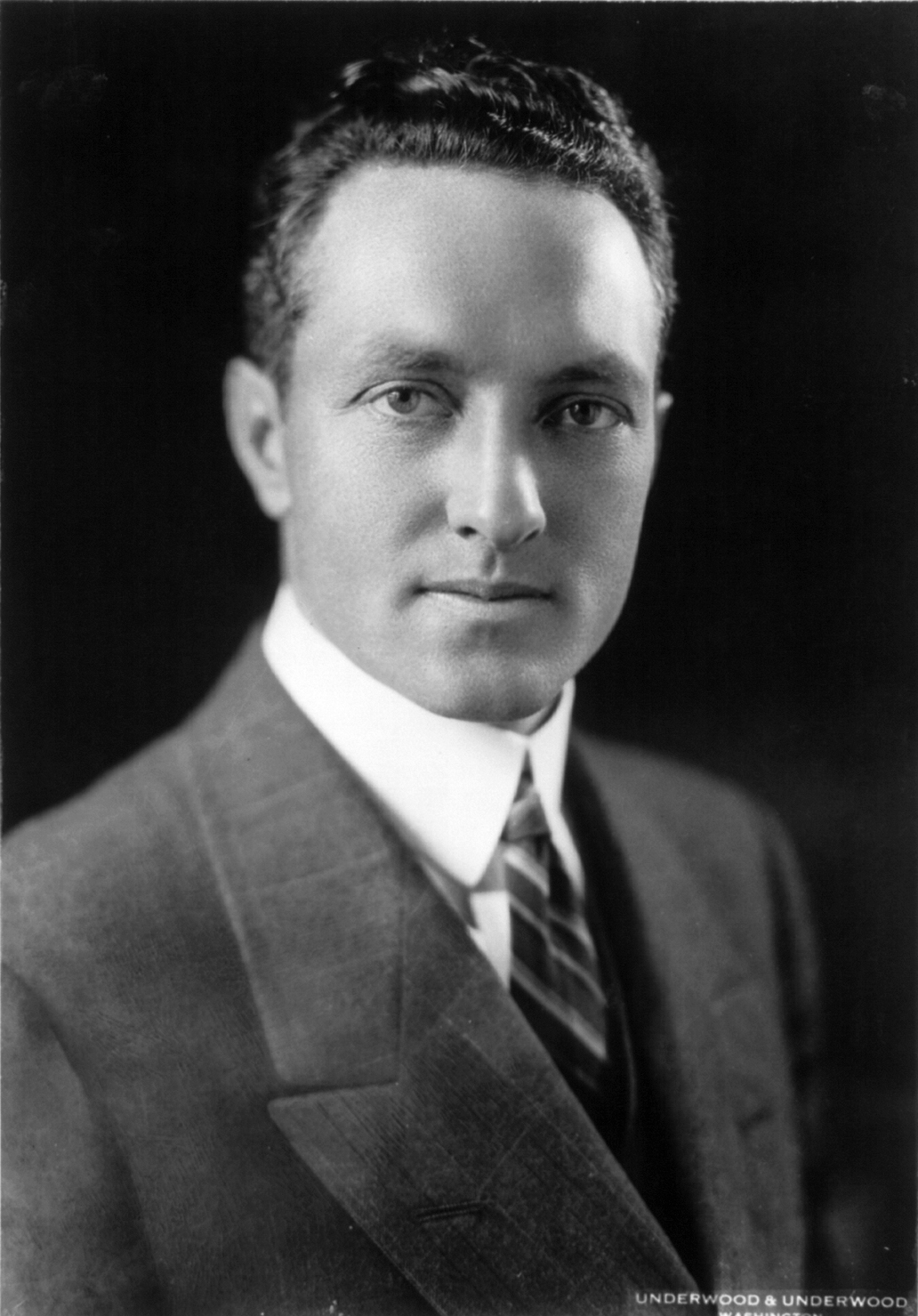
- Byrd in 1928
- Born: Richard Evelyn Byrd 4th October 25, 1888; Winchester, Virginia, U.S.
- Died: March 11, 1957 (aged 68); Boston, Massachusetts, U.S.
- Burial place: Arlington National Cemetery, Arlington, Virginia, U.S.
- Spouse: Marie Ames Byrd (m. 1915)
- Military career
- Allegiance: United States
- Branch: United States Navy
- Service years: 1912–1927; 1940–1947
- Rank: Rear Admiral
- Conflicts: American Intervention in Mexico; World War I World War II
- Awards: Medal of Honor; Navy Cross; Navy Distinguished Service Medal (2); Legion of Merit (2); Distinguished Flying Cross; Congressional Gold Medal

Richard Evelyn Byrd Jr. (October 25, 1888 – March 11, 1957) was an American naval officer, and pioneering aviator, polar explorer, and organizer of polar logistics. Aircraft flights in which he served as a navigator and expedition leader crossed the Atlantic Ocean, a segment of the Arctic Ocean, and a segment of the Antarctic Plateau. He is also known for discovering Mount Sidley, the largest dormant volcano in Antarctica.

Byrd claimed to be the first to reach both the North and South Poles by air. However, there is some controversy as to whether he was actually the first person to reach the North Pole. It is generally believed that the distance he claimed to have flown was longer than the possible fuel range of his airplane.

He was a recipient of the Medal of Honor, the United States Armed Forces' highest military decoration, and the Navy Cross, the second highest honor for valor given by the U.S. Navy.

== Family ==
Ancestral coat of arms of the Byrd family

=== Ancestry ===
Byrd was born in Winchester, Virginia, the son of Esther Bolling (Flood) and Richard Evelyn Byrd Sr. He was a descendant of one of the First Families of Virginia. His ancestors include planter John Rolfe and his wife Pocahontas, William Byrd II of Westover Plantation, who established Richmond, as well as William Byrd I and Robert "King" Carter, a colonial governor. He was also descended from George Yeardley, Francis Wyatt and Samuel Argall. He was the brother of Virginia Governor and U.S. Senator Harry F. Byrd, a dominant figure in the Virginia Democratic Party from the 1920s until the 1960s; their father served as Speaker of the Virginia House of Delegates for a time.

=== Marriage ===
On January 20, 1915, Richard married Marie Ames (d. 1974). He would later name a region of Antarctic land he discovered "Marie Byrd Land" after her, and a mountain range, the Ames Range, after her father Joseph Ames. They had four children – Richard Evelyn Byrd III, Evelyn Bolling Byrd Clarke, Katharine Agnes Byrd Breyer, and Helen Byrd Stabler. By late 1924, the Byrd family moved into a large brownstone house at 9 Brimmer Street in Boston's fashionable Beacon Hill neighborhood that had been purchased by Marie's father, a wealthy industrialist.

=== Personal life ===
Byrd was friends with Edsel Ford and his father Henry Ford, whose admiration of his polar exploits helped to gain Byrd sponsorship and financing for his various polar expeditions from the Ford Motor Company.

He had a pet dog, Igloo, who accompanied Byrd to the North and South poles and who is buried at the Pine Ridge Pet Cemetery with a tombstone that reads "He was more than a friend."

== Education and early naval career ==
Byrd attended the Virginia Military Institute for two years and transferred to the University of Virginia, before financial circumstances inspired his starting over and taking an appointment to the United States Naval Academy, where he was appointed as a midshipman on May 28, 1908.

On June 8, 1912, Byrd graduated from the Naval Academy and was commissioned an ensign in the United States Navy. On July 14, 1912, he was assigned to the battleship USS Wyoming. During service in the Caribbean Sea, Byrd received his first letter of commendation, and later a Silver Lifesaving Medal, for twice plunging fully clothed to the rescue of a sailor who had fallen overboard. In April 1914, he transferred to the armored cruiser USS Washington and served in Mexican waters in June following the American intervention in April.

His next assignment was to the gunboat USS Dolphin, which also served as the yacht of the Secretary of the Navy. This assignment brought Byrd into contact with high-ranking officials and dignitaries, including then Assistant Secretary of the Navy Franklin Roosevelt. He was promoted to the rank of lieutenant (junior grade) on June 8, 1915. During Byrd's assignment to Dolphin, he was commanded by future Fleet Admiral William D. Leahy, who served as chief of staff to President Franklin D. Roosevelt during World War II. Byrd's last assignment before forced retirement was to the presidential yacht USS Mayflower.

On March 15, 1916, Byrd, much to his frustration, was medically retired on three-quarters pay for an ankle injury he suffered on board Mayflower. Shortly thereafter, on December 14, 1916, he was assigned as the inspector and instructor for the Rhode Island Naval Militia in Providence, Rhode Island. While serving in this position, he was commended by Brigadier General Charles W. Abbot, the adjutant general of Rhode Island, for making great strides in improving the efficiency of the militia.

== First World War ==
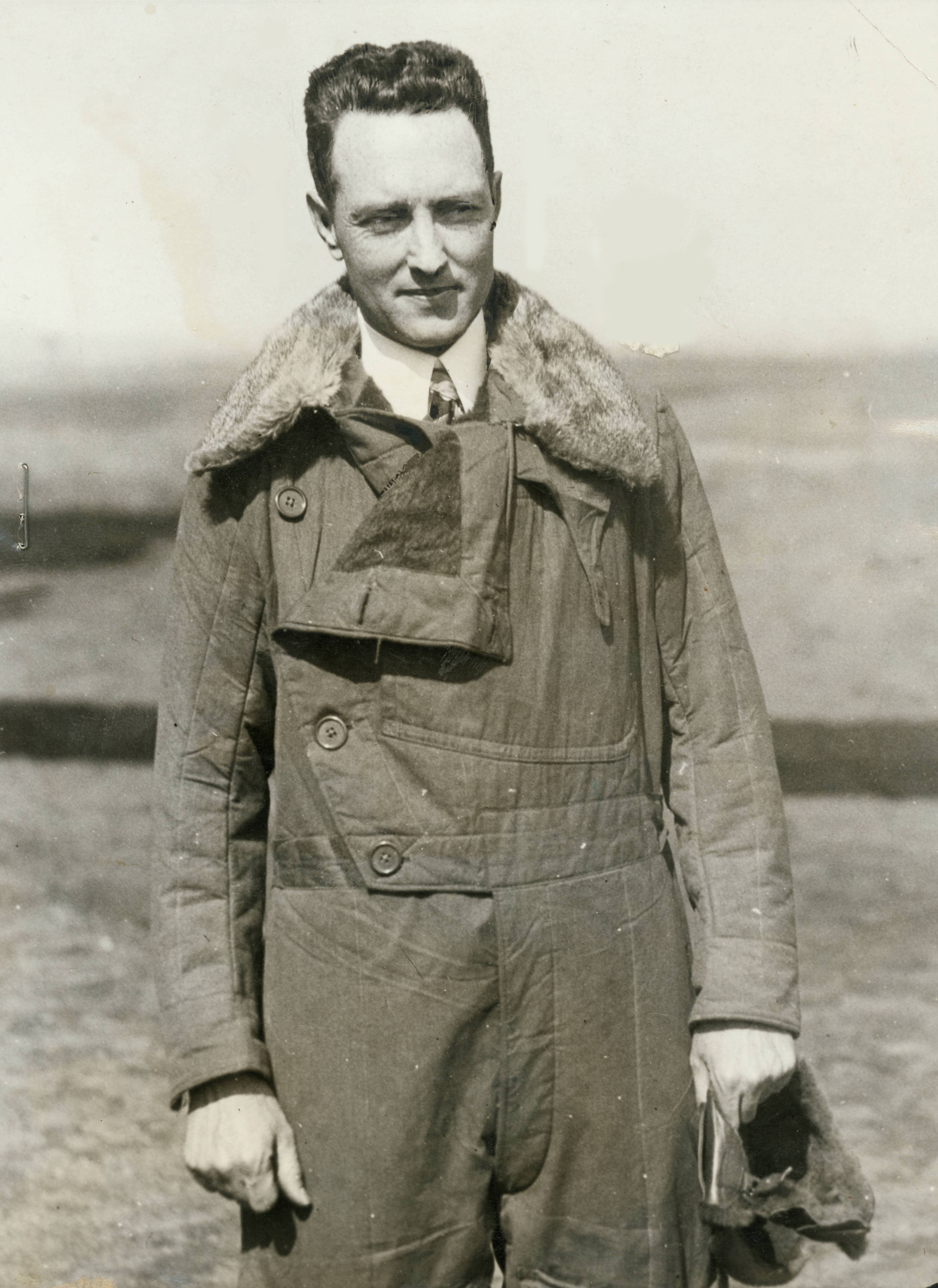
Richard Byrd in flight jacket, 1920s

Shortly after the entry of the United States into the First World War in April 1917, Byrd oversaw the mobilization of the Rhode Island Naval Militia. He was then recalled to active duty and was assigned to the Office of Naval Operations and served in a desk job as secretary and organizer of the Navy Department Commission on Training Camps. In the autumn of 1917, he was sent to naval aviation school at Pensacola, Florida. He qualified as a naval aviator (number 608) in June 1918. He then commanded naval air forces at Naval Air Station Halifax in Nova Scotia, Canada, from July 1918 until the armistice in November. In that assignment, he was promoted to the permanent rank of lieutenant and the temporary rank of lieutenant commander.

For his services during the war, he received a letter of commendation from Secretary of the Navy Josephus Daniels, which was after World War II converted to a Navy Commendation Medal.

== After the war ==
After the war, Byrd volunteered to be a crew member in the U.S. Navy's 1919 aerial transatlantic crossing. This mission was historic, as it was the first time the Atlantic Ocean was crossed by an aircraft. It was decided that only men who had not served overseas would be allowed on the mission. Unfortunately for Byrd, his tour of duty in Newfoundland was considered overseas service. Byrd was, however, able to make a valuable contribution, as his expertise in aerial navigation resulted in his appointment to plan the flight path of the mission. Of the three flying boats (NC-1, NC-3, and NC-4) that started from Newfoundland, only Lieutenant Commander Albert Read's NC-4 completed the trip on May 18, 1919, achieving the first transatlantic flight.

In 1921, Byrd volunteered to attempt a solo nonstop crossing of the Atlantic Ocean, prefiguring Charles Lindbergh's historic flight by six years. Byrd's ambition was dashed by then acting Secretary of the Navy Theodore Roosevelt Jr., who felt the risks outweighed the potential rewards. Byrd was then assigned to the ill-fated dirigible ZR-2 (formerly the British airship R-38). As fate would have it, Byrd missed his train to take him to the airship on August 24, 1921. The airship broke apart in midair, killing 44 of 49 crew members on board. Byrd lost several friends in the accident, and was involved in the subsequent recovery operations and investigation. The accident affected him deeply and inspired him to make safety a top priority in all of his future expeditions.

Due to reductions in the Navy after the First World War, Byrd reverted to the rank of lieutenant at the end of 1921. During the summer of 1923, then-Lieutenant Byrd and a group of volunteer Navy veterans of the First World War helped found the Naval Reserve Air Station (NRAS) at Squantum Point near Boston, using an unused First World War seaplane hangar which had remained more-or-less intact after the Victory Destroyer Plant shipyard was built on the site. NRAS Squantum was commissioned on August 15, 1923, and is considered to have been the first air base in the Naval Reserve program.

Byrd commanded the aviation unit of the arctic expedition to North Greenland led by Donald B. MacMillan from June to October 1925. Although the expedition was largely unsuccessful (they did not in fact reach the pole) Byrd's efforts and the successful contributions of the aviation element during the expedition led to Byrd's renown as a pioneer of aircraft in exploration.

During this expedition, Byrd made the acquaintance of Navy Chief Aviation Pilot Floyd Bennett and Norwegian pilot Bernt Balchen, both of whom would later contribute to Byrd's expeditions. Bennett served as a pilot in his flight to the North Pole the next year. Balchen, whose knowledge of Arctic flight operations proved invaluable, was the primary pilot on Byrd's flight to the South Pole in 1929.

== 1926 North Pole flight ==
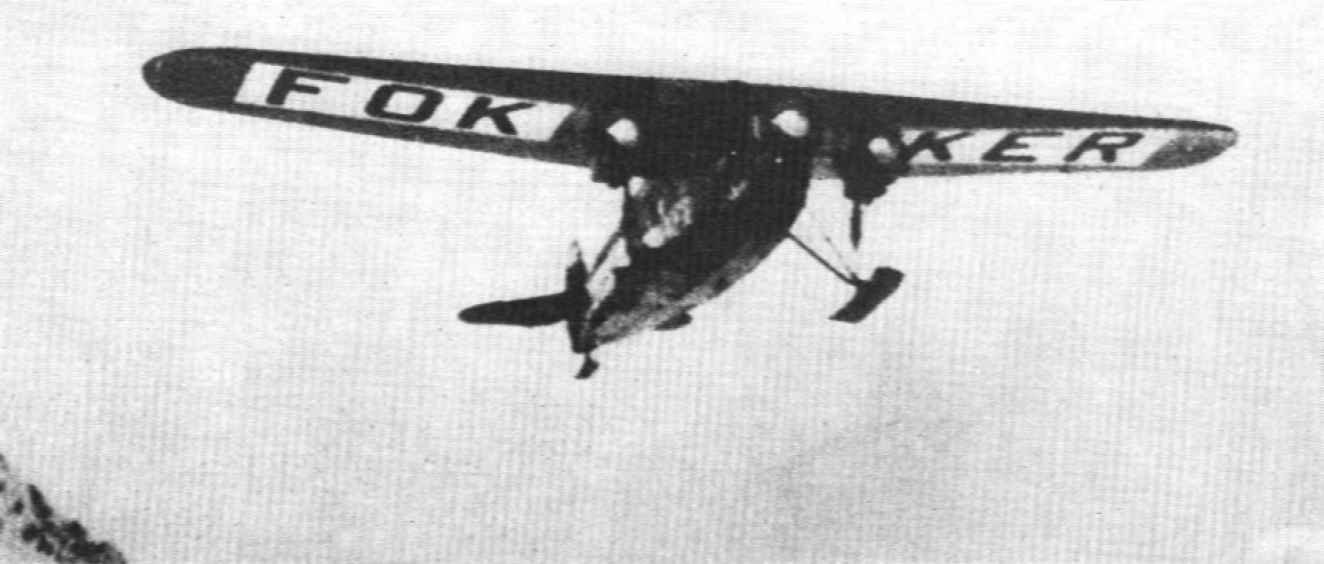
The Fokker F.VII of Byrd and Bennett in flight

On May 9, 1926, Byrd and Navy Chief Aviation Pilot Floyd Bennett attempted a flight over the North Pole in a Fokker F.VIIa/3m tri-motor monoplane named Josephine Ford after the daughter of Ford Motor Company president Edsel Ford, who helped finance the expedition. In addition to Ford contributions, John D. Rockefeller also notably provided funding for the expedition. The flight left from Spitsbergen (Svalbard) and returned to its takeoff airfield, lasting 15 hours and 57 minutes, including 13 minutes spent circling at their Farthest North. Byrd and Bennett said they reached the North Pole, a distance of 1,535 miles (1,335 nautical miles).

When he returned to the United States from the Arctic, Byrd became a national hero. He was thrown a parade in New York City, and Congress passed a special act on December 21, 1926, promoting him to the rank of commander and awarding both Floyd Bennett and him the Medal of Honor. The Josephine Ford was flown around the country in celebration. Bennett was promoted to the warrant officer rank of machinist. Byrd and Bennett were presented with Tiffany Cross versions of the Medal of Honor on March 5, 1927, at the White House by President Calvin Coolidge.

=== Controversy ===
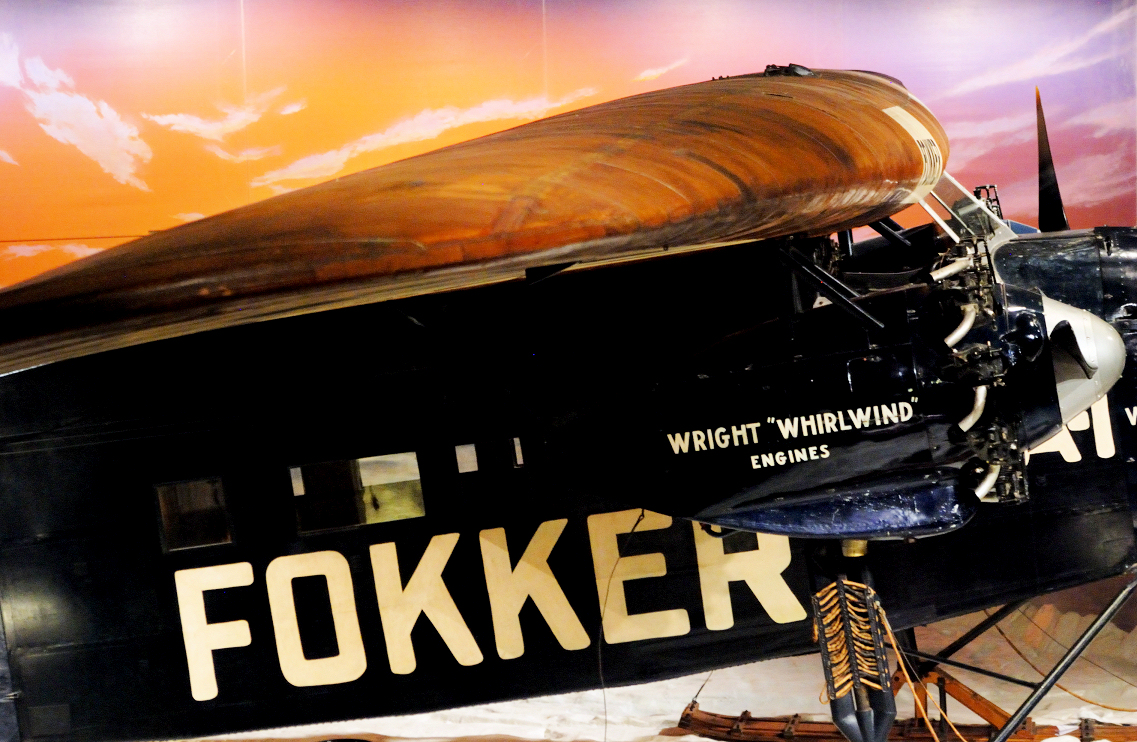
The Fokker FVIIa/3M – Josephine Ford, on display at The Henry Ford Museum

Since 1926, doubts have been raised, defenses made, and heated controversy arose over whether or not Byrd actually reached the North Pole. In 1958, Norwegian-American aviator and explorer Bernt Balchen cast doubt on Byrd's statement on the basis of his knowledge of the airplane's speed. Balchen said that Bennett had confessed to him months after the flight that he and Byrd had not reached the pole. Bennett, who had not completely healed from the early crash, developed pneumonia after participating in a flight to rescue downed German aviators in Greenly Island, Canada, leading to his death on April 25, 1928. Bennett, though, had started a memoir, given numerous interviews, and wrote an article for an aviation magazine about the flight before his death that all confirmed Byrd's version of the flight.

The 1996 release of Byrd's diary of the May 9, 1926, flight revealed erased (but still legible) sextant sights that sharply differ from Byrd's later June 22 typewritten official report to the National Geographic Society. Byrd took a sextant reading of the Sun at 7:07:10 GCT. His erased diary record shows the apparent (observed) solar altitude to have been 19°25'30", while his later official typescript reports the same 7:07:10 apparent solar altitude to have been 18°18'18". On the basis of this and other data in the diary, Dennis Rawlins concluded that Byrd steered accurately, and flew about 80% of the distance to the pole before turning back because of an engine oil leak, but later falsified his official report to support his statement of reaching the pole.

Accepting that the conflicting data in the typed report's flight times indeed require both northward and southward ground speeds greater than the flight's 85-mph airspeed, a Byrd defender posits a westerly-moving anticyclone that tailwind-boosted Byrd's ground speed on both outward and inward legs, allowing the distance said to be covered in the time stated (the theory is based on rejecting handwritten sextant data in favor of typewritten alleged dead-reckoning data). This suggestion has been challenged by Dennis Rawlins, who adds that the sextant data in the long-unavailable original official typewritten report are all expressed to 1 second, a precision not possible on Navy sextants of 1926 and not the precision of the sextant data in Byrd's diary for 1925 or the 1926 flight, which was normal (half or quarter of a minute of arc).

If Byrd and Bennett did not reach the North Pole, then the first flight over the pole occurred a few days later, on May 12, 1926, with the flight of the airship Norge that flew from Spitsbergen (Svalbard) to Alaska nonstop with a crew including Roald Amundsen, Umberto Nobile, Oscar Wisting, and Lincoln Ellsworth.

== 1927 Trans-Atlantic flight ==
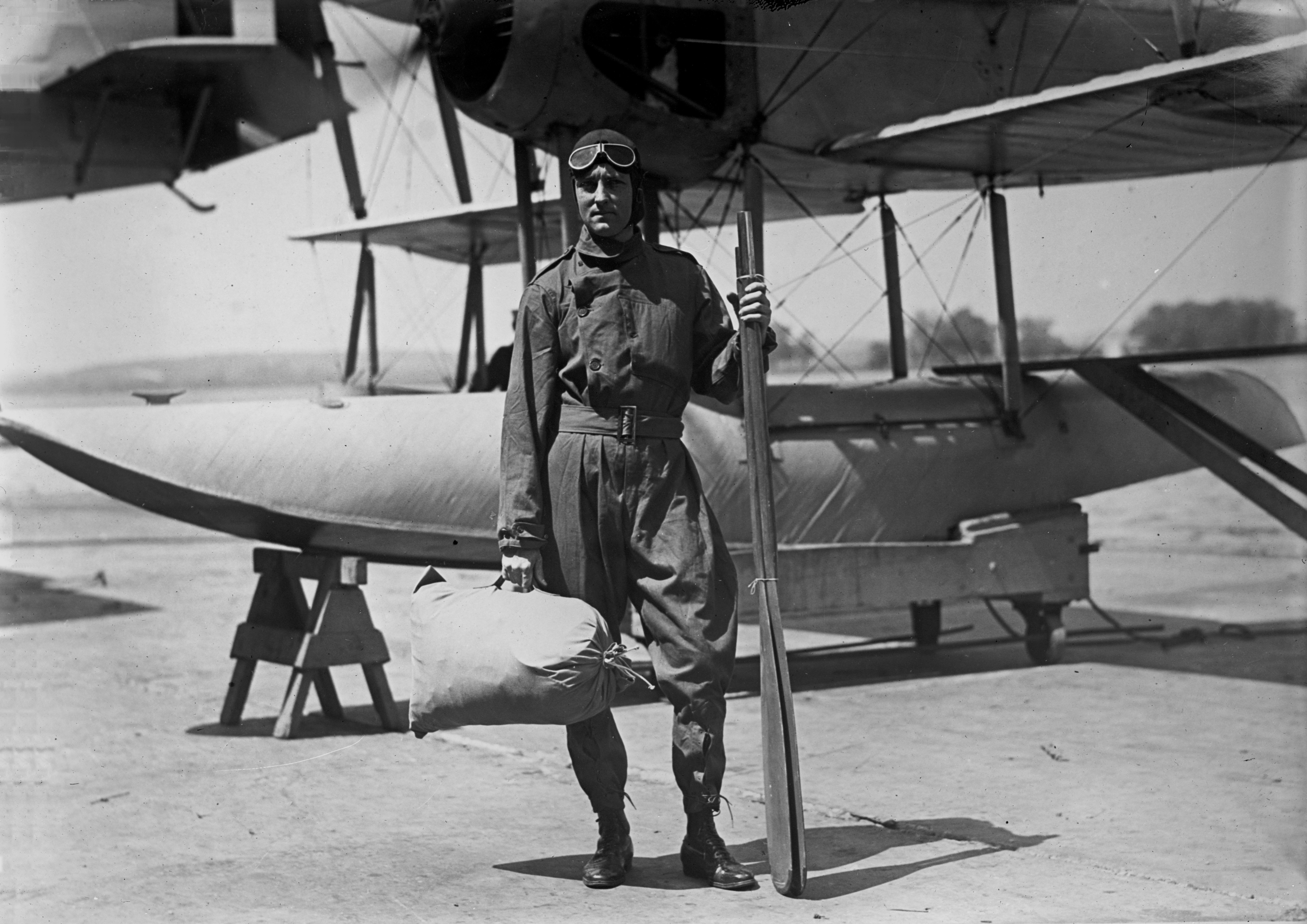
Lt. Com. Byrd and aircraft

In 1927, Byrd announced he had the backing of the American Trans-Oceanic Company, which had been established in 1914 by department-store magnate Rodman Wanamaker for the purpose of building aircraft to complete nonstop flights across the Atlantic Ocean. Byrd was one of several aviators who attempted to win the Orteig Prize in 1927 for making the first nonstop flight between the United States and France.

Once again, Byrd named Floyd Bennett as his chief pilot, with Norwegian Bernt Balchen, Bert Acosta, and Lieutenant George Noville as other crewmembers. During a practice takeoff with Anthony Fokker at the controls and Bennett in the co-pilot seat, the Fokker Trimotor airplane, America, crashed, severely injuring Bennett and slightly injuring Byrd. As the plane was being repaired, Charles Lindbergh won the prize by completing his historic flight on May 21, 1927. (Coincidentally, in 1925, then Army Air Service Reserve Corps Lieutenant Charles Lindbergh had applied to serve as a pilot on Byrd's North Pole expedition, but apparently, his bid came too late.)

Byrd continued with his quest to cross the Atlantic nonstop, naming Balchen to replace Bennett, who had not yet fully recovered from his injuries, as chief pilot. Byrd, Balchen, Acosta, and Noville flew from Roosevelt Field, East Garden City, New York, in the America on June 29, 1927. On board was mail from the US Postal Service to demonstrate the practicality of aircraft. Arriving over France the next day, they were prevented from landing in Paris by cloud cover; they returned to the coast of Normandy and crash-landed near the beach at Ver-sur-Mer (known as Gold Beach during the Normandy Invasion on June 6, 1944) without fatalities on July 1, 1927. In France, Byrd and his crew were received as heroes and Byrd was invested as an Officer of the French Legion of Honor by Prime Minister Raymond Poincaré on July 6.

After their return to the United States, an elaborate dinner in their honor was held in New York City on July 19. Byrd and Noville were awarded the Distinguished Flying Cross by Secretary of the Navy Curtis D. Wilbur at the dinner. Acosta and Balchen did not receive the Distinguished Flying Cross because, at that time, it could only be awarded to members of the armed services and not to civilians.

Byrd wrote an article for the August 1927 edition of Popular Science Monthly in which he accurately predicted that while specially modified aircraft with one to three crewmen would fly the Atlantic nonstop, another 20 years were needed before it would be realized on a commercial scale.

== Early Antarctic expeditions ==
=== First Antarctic expedition (1928–1930) ===
Flag used by Byrd in his Second Antarctic Expedition.

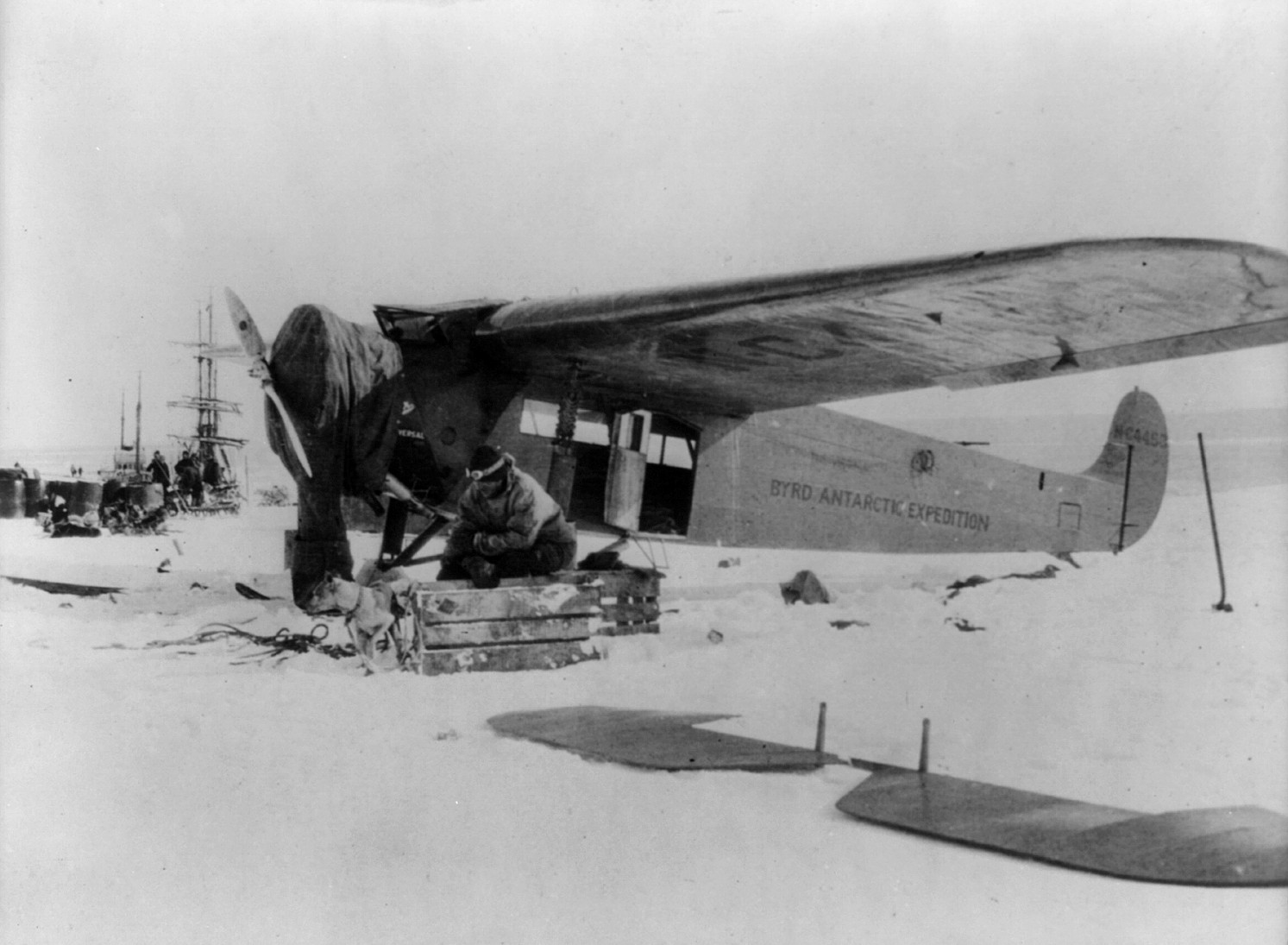
Fokker Super Universal of the Byrd Antarctic expedition of 1929

In 1928, Byrd began his first expedition to the Antarctic involving two ships and three airplanes: Byrd's flagship was the City of New York (a Norwegian sealing ship previously named Samson that had come into fame as a ship some said was in the vicinity of the Titanic when the latter was sinking) and the Eleanor Bolling (named after Byrd's mother); a Ford Trimotor airplane called the Floyd Bennett (named after the recently deceased pilot of Byrd's previous expeditions) flown by Dean Smith; a Fairchild FC-2W2, NX8006, built 1928, named Stars And Stripes (now displayed at the National Air and Space Museum's Steven F. Udvar-Hazy Center); and a Fokker Super Universal monoplane called the Virginia (Byrd's birth state). A base camp named "Little America" was constructed on the Ross Ice Shelf, and scientific expeditions by snowshoe, dog sled, snowmobile, and airplane began. To increase the interest of youth in arctic exploration, a 19-year-old American Boy Scout, Paul Allman Siple, was chosen to accompany the expedition. Siple went on to earn a doctorate and was probably the only person, other than Byrd himself, to participate in all five of Byrd's Antarctic expeditions.

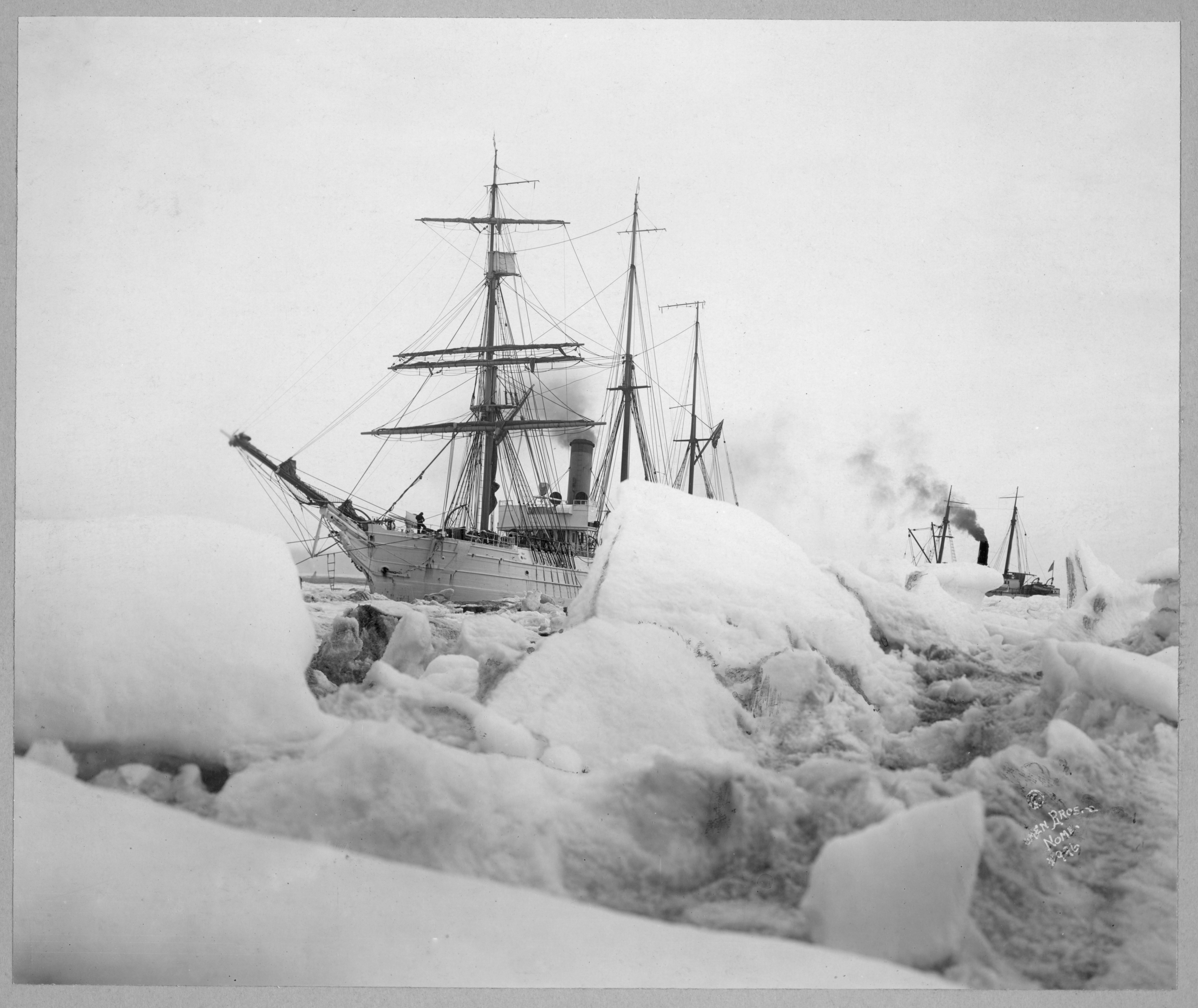
Byrd's expedition ship.

Photographic expeditions and geological surveys were undertaken for the duration of that summer, and constant radio communications were maintained with the outside world. After their first winter, their expeditions were resumed, and on November 28, 1929, the first flight to the South Pole and back was launched. Byrd, along with pilot Bernt Balchen, co-pilot/radioman Harold June, and photographer Ashley McKinley, flew the Floyd Bennett to the South Pole and back in 18 hours, 41 minutes. They had difficulty gaining enough altitude, and they had to dump empty gas tanks, as well as their emergency supplies, to achieve the altitude of the Antarctic Plateau, but they ultimately were successful.

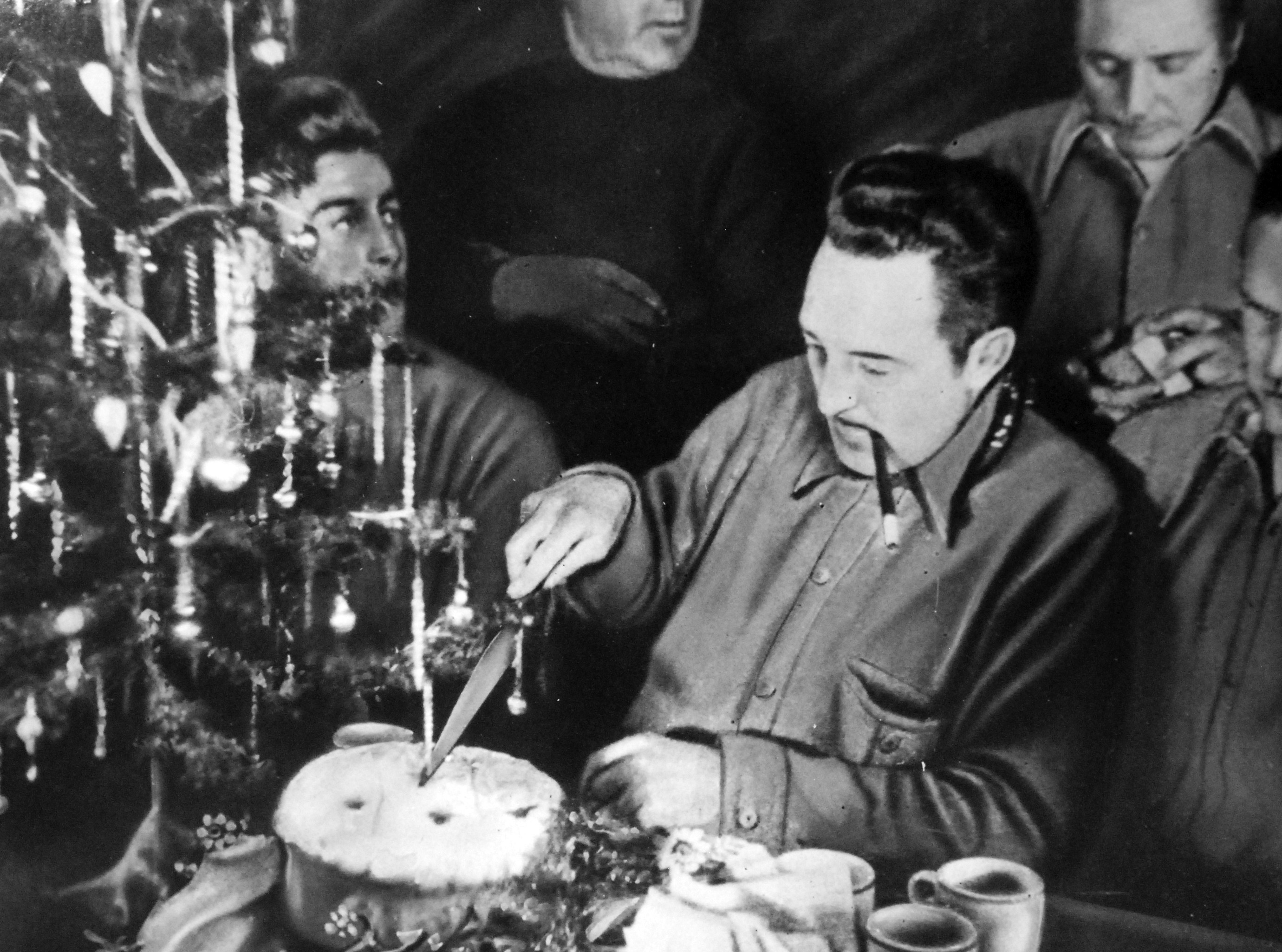
Celebrating Christmas below the Antarctic Circle, Byrd's First Antarctic Expedition

In November 1929, Byrd participated in a privately financed expedition, where he headed the inaugural aircraft crew that successfully flew over the South Pole. Byrd strongly advocated for ski-equipped aircraft, despite the considerable operational, logistical, and maintenance challenges they posed, necessitating the establishment of significant onshore bases to address these issues.

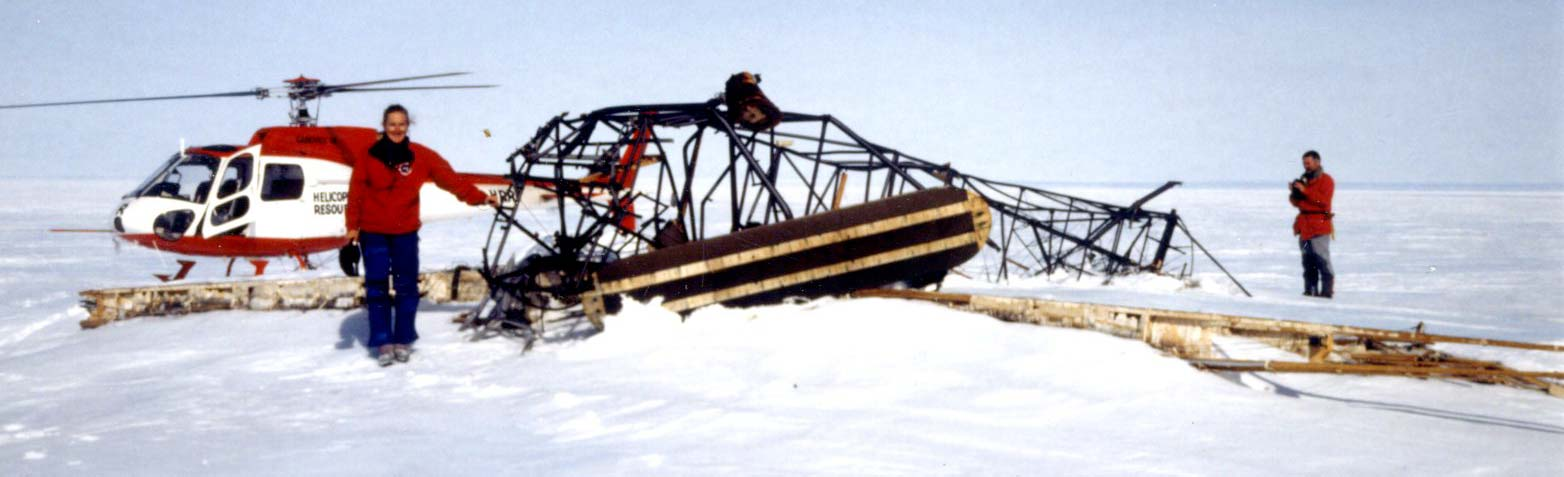
Remains of Fokker aircraft in the Rockefeller Mountains, Antarctica, in 1993

As a result of his achievement, Byrd was promoted to the rank of rear admiral by a special act of Congress on December 21, 1929. As he was only 41 years old at the time, this promotion made Byrd the youngest admiral in the history of the United States Navy. By way of comparison, none of his Annapolis classmates became admirals until 1942, after 30 years of commissioned service. He is one of only four persons including Admiral David Dixon Porter, Arctic explorer Rear Admiral Donald Baxter MacMillan and Rear Admiral Frederic R. Harris, to have been promoted to the rank of rear admiral in the United States Navy without having first held the rank of captain.

After a further summer of exploration, the expedition returned to North America on June 18, 1930. Unlike the 1926 flight, this expedition was honored with the gold medal of the American Geographical Society. This was also seen in the film With Byrd at the South Pole (1930), which covered his trip there.

Byrd, an American polar explorer and aviator, served for a time as Honorary National President (1931–1935) of Pi Gamma Mu, the international honor society in the social sciences. He carried the society's flag during his first Antarctic expedition to dramatize the spirit of adventure into the unknown, characterizing both the natural and social sciences.

To finance and gain both political and public support for his expeditions, Byrd actively cultivated relationships with many powerful individuals, including President Franklin Roosevelt, Henry Ford, Edsel Ford, John D. Rockefeller Jr., and Vincent Astor. As a token of his gratitude, Byrd named geographic features in the Antarctic after his supporters.

=== Second Antarctic expedition (1933–1934) ===
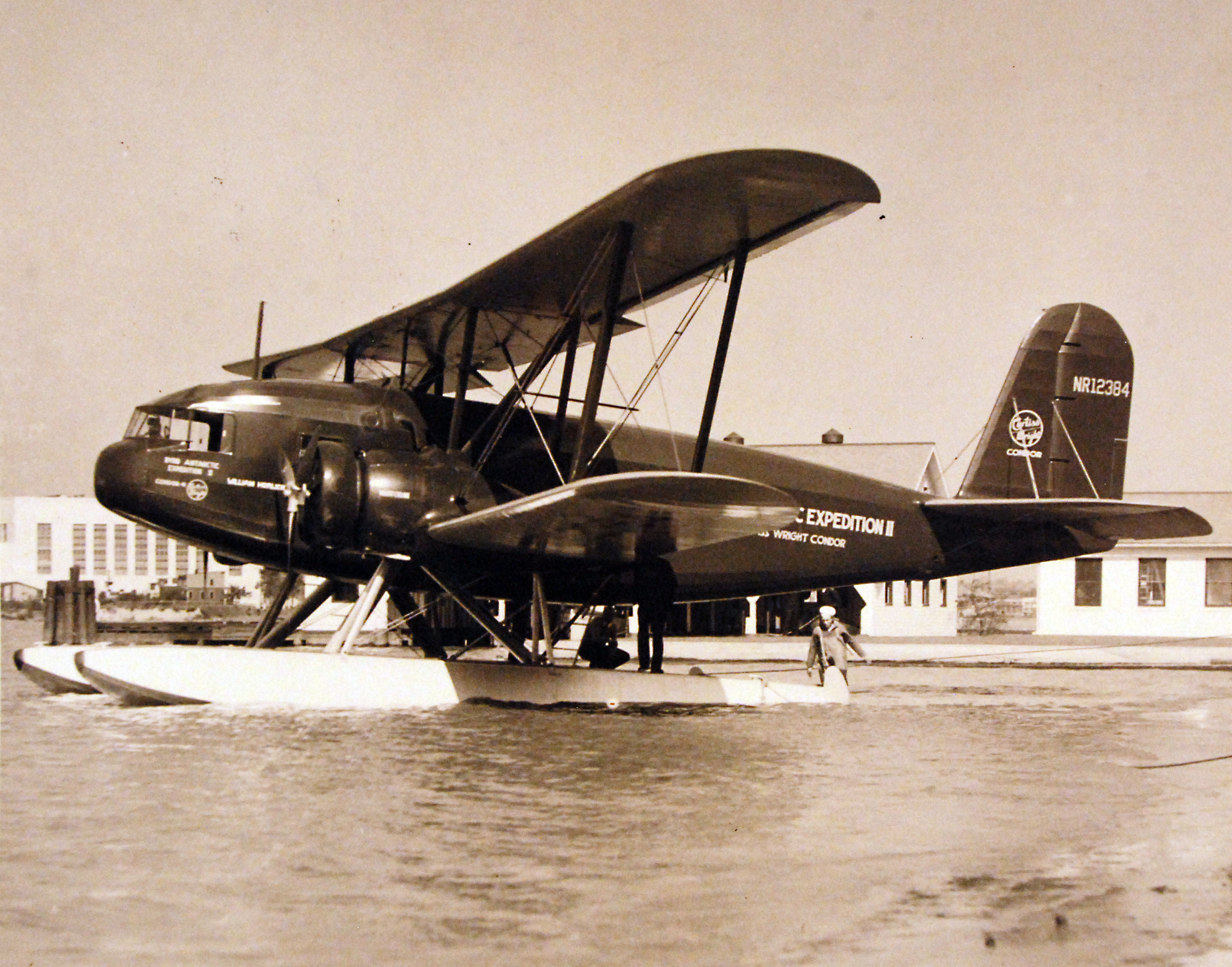
Byrd's Curtiss T-32 Condor II of second Antarctic expedition, November 1933

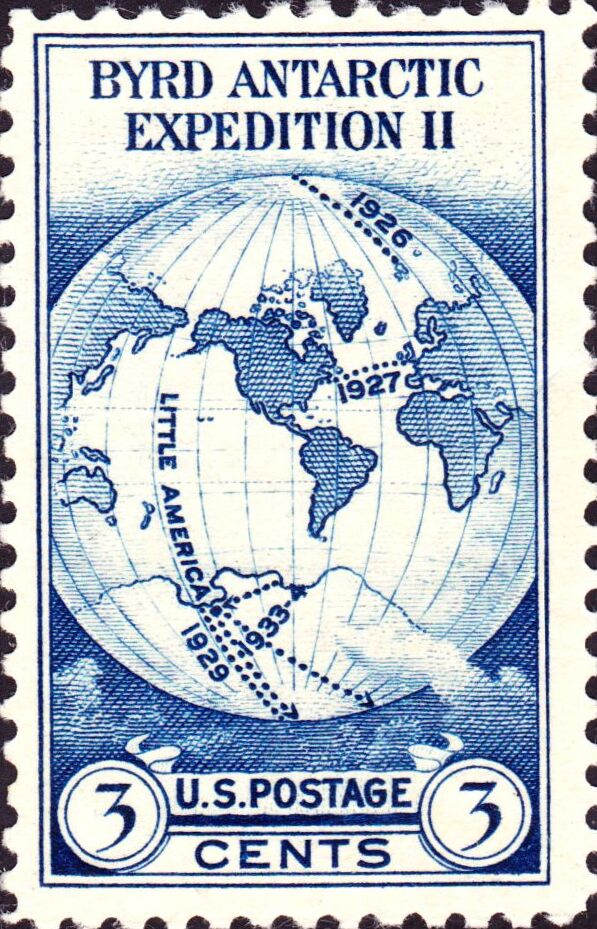
Antarctic Expedition 3 cent, issue of 1933. The basic design, featuring a map, was inspired by President F. D. Roosevelt. See FDR sketch

On his second expedition during the Southern Hemisphere summer of 1933–1934, (winter in the United States, in the Northern Hemisphere), Byrd spent five months alone operating a meteorological station, Advance Base, from which he narrowly escaped with his life after suffering carbon monoxide poisoning from a poorly ventilated stove. Unusual radio transmissions from Byrd finally began to alarm the men at the base camp, who then attempted to go to Advance Base. The first two trips were failures due to darkness, snow, and mechanical troubles. Finally, Thomas Poulter, E. J. Demas, and Amory Waite arrived at Advance Base, where they found Byrd in poor physical health. The men remained at Advance Base until October 12. when an airplane from the base camp picked up Dr. Poulter and Byrd. The rest of the men returned to base camp with the tractor. This expedition is described by Byrd in his autobiography Alone.

During the summer months the days were long and the evenings existed in twilight. Inside the exploration headquarters Byrd had fashioned a large calendar on the wall, where he would cross off each day as it passed.

A CBS radio station, KFZ, was set up on the base camp ship, the Bear of Oakland and The Adventures of Admiral Byrd program was short-waved to Buenos Aires, then relayed to New York. Sponsored by General Foods, the broadcasts aired on Saturday nights at 10:00 pm and reached #16 on the Hooper rating for the 1933–34 broadcast season, reaching an average audience of 19.1 million.

Byrd's Antarctic expedition prompted President Roosevelt and the U.S. Postmaster General to honor the event in 1933 on a U.S. commemorative stamp which greatly helped raise the funding needed to finance Byrd's expedition to the Antarctic. The expedition, via the Post Office, sold philatelic subscription Philatelic covers to be serviced at the official USPOD post office set up in the Antarctic exploration base, dubbed Little America, and which was officially established on October 6, 1933. All mail sent to the Antarctic required at least one Byrd II 3 cent stamp (pictured), along with sufficient postage amounting to 53 cents. The postage stamp is numbered 753 in the Scott's Catalog. The U.S. Post Office contracted with the expedition for this purpose as it had no other means to deliver mail to and from the Antarctic. Approximately 150,000 pieces of such mail went through the special Antarctic post office in 1933 to 1934. As only members of the post office were authorized to postmark and handle mail, Charles F. Anderson, a special representative of the Postmaster General, was assigned to the post office at Little America in Antarctica.

In late 1938, Byrd visited Hamburg, where he was invited by Alfred Ritscher, leader of the German Antarctic Expedition 1938/39, to present his Antarctic film to the expedition members. According to German historian Heinz Schön, Byrd answered questions and offered practical advice to the scientists and aircrew based on his polar experience. The event was held privately, with no press present.

=== Antarctic Service Expedition (1939–1940) ===
Byrd's third expedition was the first one financed and conducted by the United States government. The project included extensive studies of geology, biology, meteorology, and exploration. The innovative Antarctic Snow Cruiser was brought with the expedition, but broke down shortly after arriving.

Within a few months, in March 1940, Byrd was recalled to active duty in the Office of the Chief of Naval Operations. The expedition continued in Antarctica without him until the last of its participants left Antarctica on March 22, 1941.

== World War II ==
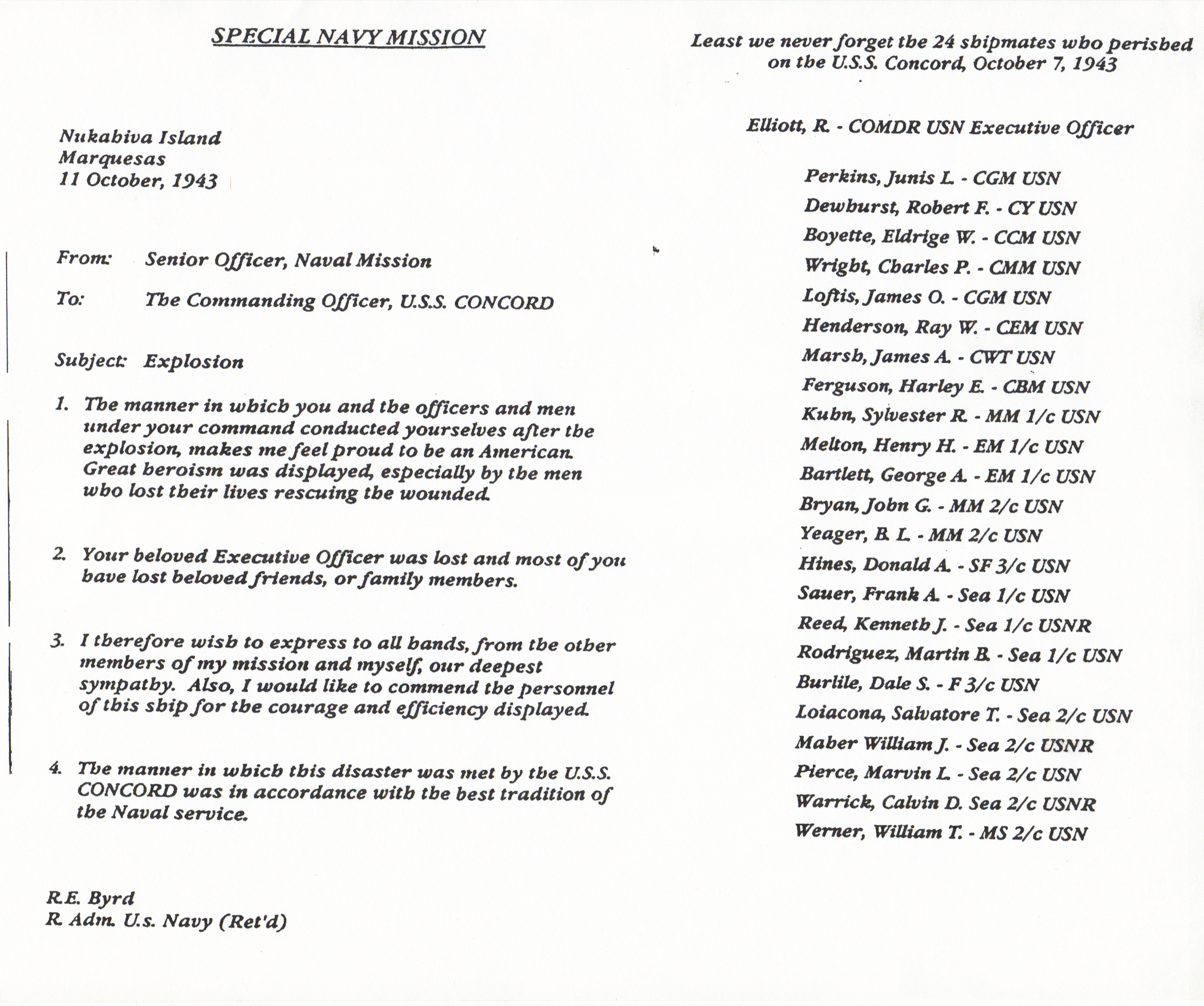
Letter from RADM Richard E. Byrd to Captain Irving R. Chambers, Commanding Officer, USS Concord, commemorating the loss of 24 men during Byrd's special mission to reconnoiter South Sea islands during September–December 1943.

As a senior officer in the United States Navy, Byrd was recalled on active duty on March 26, 1942, and served as the confidential advisor to Admiral Ernest J. King. From 1942 to 1945 he served on the South Pacific Island Base Inspection Board, which toured bases in the South Pacific in May and June 1942. The report submitted by the Board describes conditions found at each base and analyses, lessons learned in planning and equipping these bases. The report contains recommendations applicable to the individual bases and others designed to be helpful in the planning of future advanced bases.

On 1 September 1943, in compliance with a series of letters from the President to the Secretary of the Navy, the Commander-in-Chief United States Fleet and Chief of Naval Operations ordered Byrd to assume direction of a survey and "investigation of certain islands in the East and South Pacific in connection with national defense and commercial air bases and routes." The members of the Special Navy Mission sailed from Balboa, Canal Zone, on USS Concord, Captain Irving Reynold Chambers, commanding, in September 1943. A large explosion at sea on October 7, 1943, took the lives of 24 Concord crewmen, including the executive officer, Commander Rogers Elliott. Caused by ignition of gasoline fumes at the stern of the ship, the explosion threw some men overboard, while others were killed from concussion, burns, fractured skulls and broken necks. Several sailors died while trying to save their shipmates. The dead were buried at sea on October 8. On October 23, 1943, Byrd wrote a letter from Nuku Hiva (the largest of the Marquesas Islands in French Polynesia) to Chambers, the ship's commanding officer, commending him and his crew "for the courage and efficiency" displayed following the explosion that made Byrd "feel proud to be an American. Great heroism was displayed, especially by the men who lost their lives rescuing the wounded." Byrd completed the Special Mission in December and participated in the United States Strategic Bombing Survey (USSBS) in 1944 to 1945.

On February 10, 1945, Byrd received the Order of Christopher Columbus from the government of the Dominican Republic. Byrd was present at the Japanese surrender in Tokyo Bay on September 2, 1945. He was released from active duty on October 1, 1945. In recognition of his service during World War II, Byrd received two awards of the Legion of Merit.

== Later Antarctic expeditions ==
=== Operation Highjump (1946–1947) ===
Cover of Byrd's autobiography

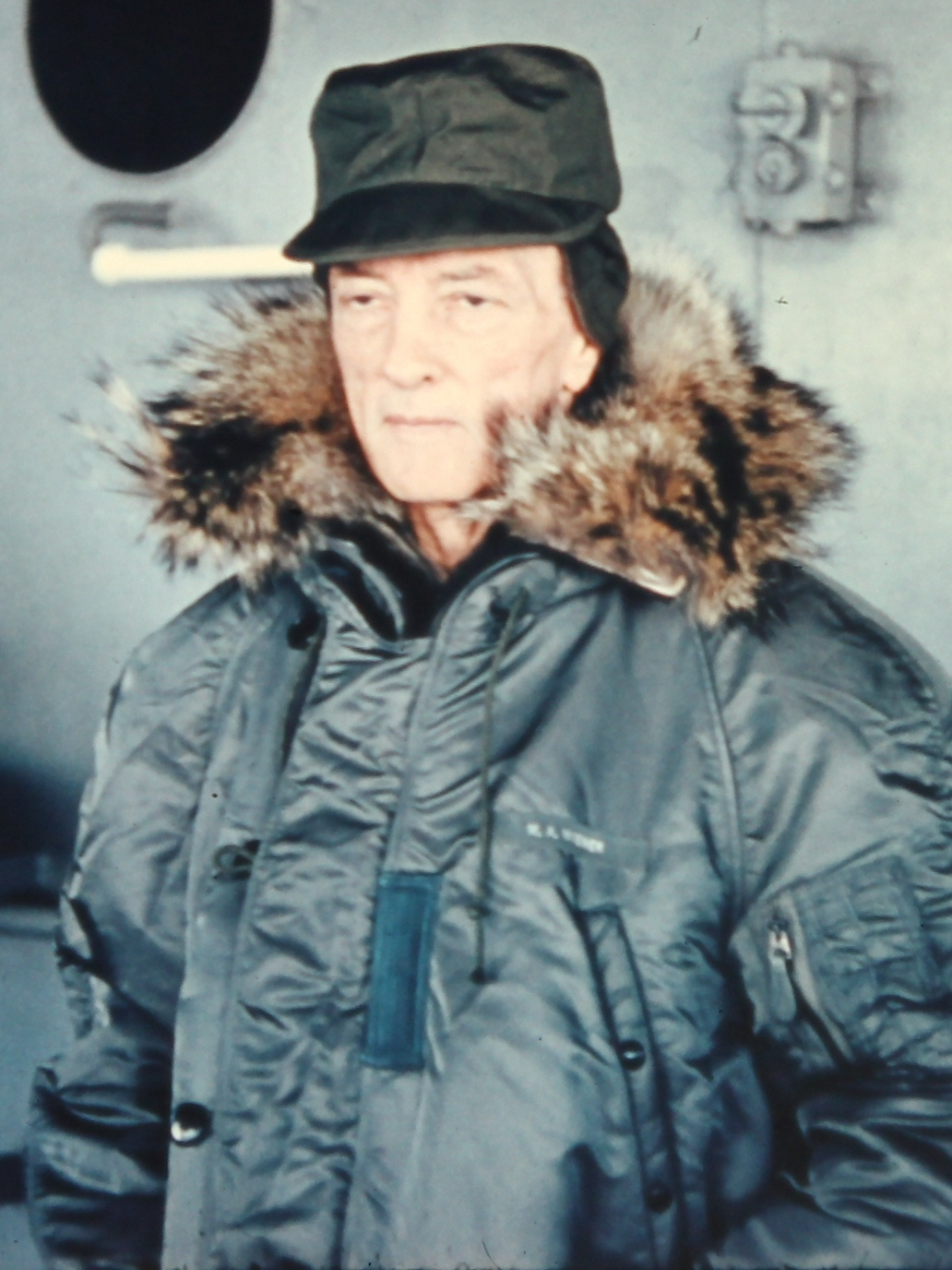
Admiral Byrd during Operation Deep Freeze I (Dec. 1955)

In 1946, Secretary of the Navy James Forrestal appointed Byrd as officer in charge of Antarctic Developments Project. Byrd's fourth Antarctic expedition was code-named Operation Highjump. It was the largest Antarctic expedition to date and was expected to last 6–8 months.

The expedition was supported by a large naval force (designated Task Force 68), commanded by Rear Admiral Richard H. Cruzen. Thirteen US Navy support ships (besides the flagship USS Mount Olympus and the aircraft carrier USS Philippine Sea), six helicopters, six flying boats, two seaplane tenders, and 15 other aircraft were used. The total number of personnel involved was over 4,000.

The armada arrived in the Ross Sea on December 31, 1946, and made aerial explorations of an area half the size of the United States, recording 10 new mountain ranges. The major area covered was the eastern coastline of Antarctica from 150°E to the Greenwich meridian.

Admiral Byrd was interviewed by Lee van Atta of International News Service aboard the expedition's command ship USS Mount Olympus, in which he discussed the lessons learned from the operation. The interview appeared in the Wednesday, March 5, 1947, edition of the Chilean newspaper El Mercurio, and read in part:

Admiral Richard E. Byrd warned today that the United States should adopt measures of protection against the possibility of an invasion of the country by hostile planes coming from the polar regions. The admiral explained that he was not trying to scare anyone, but the cruel reality is that in case of a new war, the United States could be attacked by planes flying over one or both poles. This statement was made as part of a recapitulation of his own polar experience, in an exclusive interview with International News Service. Talking about the recently completed expedition, Byrd said that the most important result of his observations and discoveries is the potential effect that they have in relation to the security of the United States. The fantastic speed with which the world is shrinking – recalled the admiral – is one of the most important lessons learned during his recent Antarctic exploration. I have to warn my compatriots that the time has ended when we were able to take refuge in our isolation and rely on the certainty that the distances, the oceans, and the poles were a guarantee of safety.

In 1948, the U.S. Navy produced a documentary about Operation Highjump named The Secret Land. The film shows live-action footage of the operation, along with a few re-enacted scenes. It won the Academy Award for Best Documentary.

On December 8, 1954, Byrd appeared on the television show Longines Chronoscope. He was interviewed by Larry LeSueur and Kenneth Crawford about his Antarctic voyages, and said that Antarctica, in the future, would become the most important place in the world for science.

=== Operation Deep Freeze I (1955–1956) ===
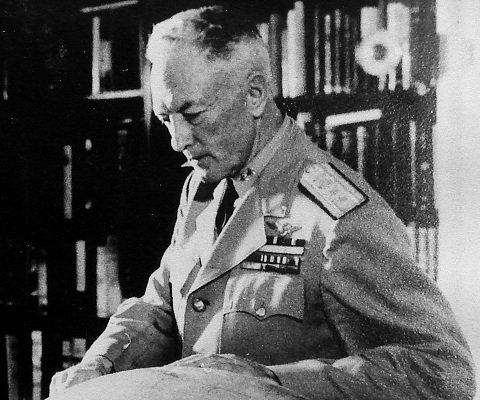
Rear Admiral Byrd (circa 1955)

As part of the multinational collaboration for the International Geophysical Year (IGY) 1957–58, Byrd was appointed as officer in charge of the U.S. Navy Operation Deep Freeze I in 1955–56, which established permanent Antarctic bases at McMurdo Sound, the Bay of Whales, and the South Pole. This was Byrd's last trip to Antarctica, and marked the beginning of a permanent U.S. military presence in Antarctica. Byrd spent only one week in the Antarctic, and started his return to the United States on February 3, 1956.

== Death ==
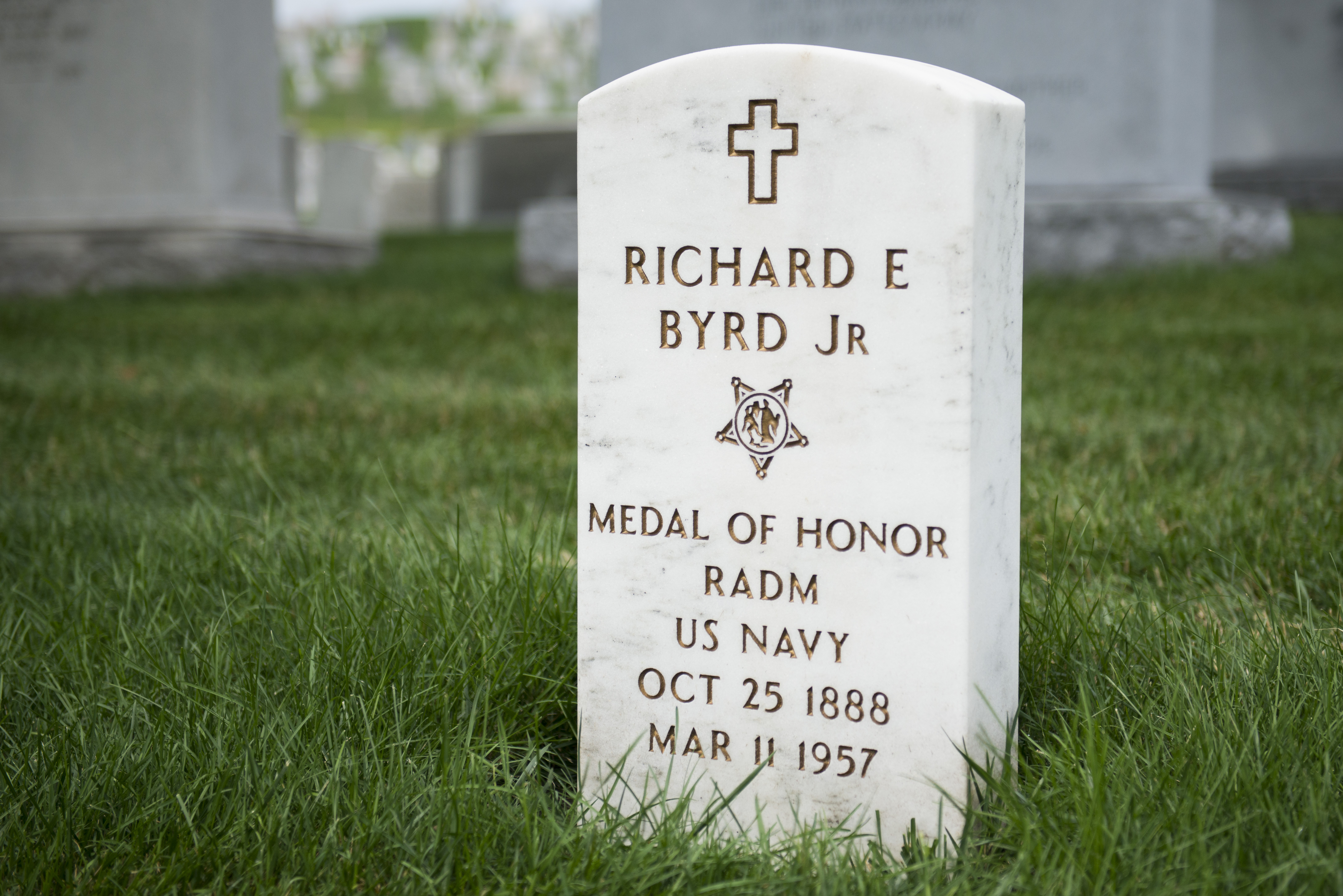
Grave of Rear Admiral Richard E. Byrd

Admiral Byrd died in his sleep of a heart ailment at the age of 68 on March 11, 1957, at his home at 7 Brimmer Street in the Beacon Hill neighborhood in Boston. He is buried in Arlington National Cemetery.

== Memberships ==
Byrd was an active Freemason. He was raised (became a Master Mason) in Federal Lodge No. 1, Washington, D.C., on March 19, 1921, and affiliated with Kane Lodge No. 454, New York City, September 18, 1928. He was a member of National Sojourners Chapter No. 3 at Washington. In 1930, Byrd was awarded a gold medal by Kane Lodge.

In 1931, Byrd became a compatriot of the Tennessee Society of the Sons of the American Revolution. He was assigned state membership number 605 and national membership number 50430. He received the society's War Service Medal for his service during the First World War.

He was also a member of numerous other patriotic, scientific, and charitable organizations, including the Explorers Club, the American Legion, and the National Geographic Society.

== Honors ==
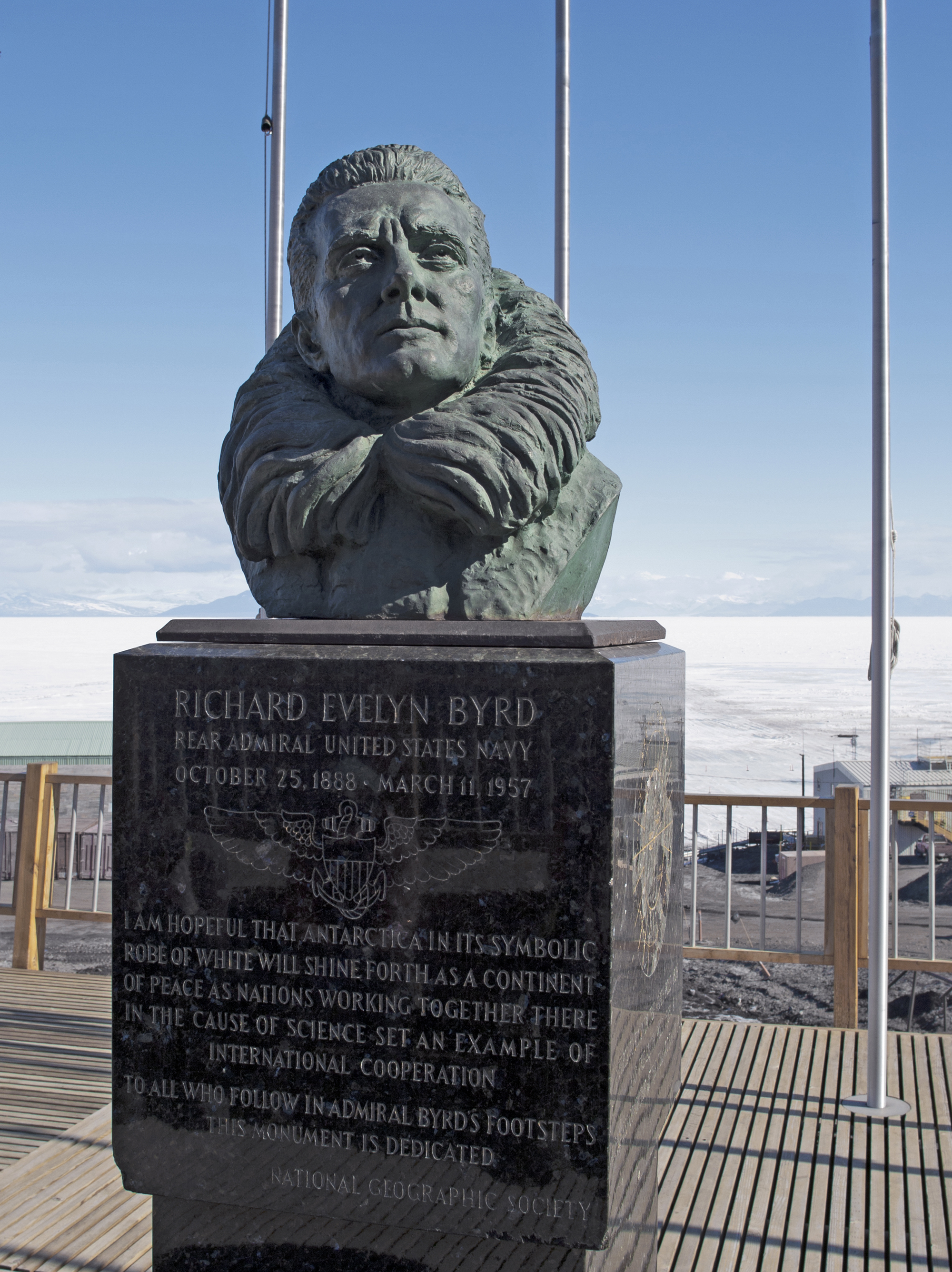
Bust of Richard E. Byrd by Felix de Weldon at McMurdo Station, Antarctica.

By the time he died, Byrd had amassed 22 citations and special commendations, nine of which were for bravery and two for extraordinary heroism in saving the lives of others. In addition, he received the Medal of Honor, the Silver Lifesaving Medal, the Navy Distinguished Service Medal, the Distinguished Flying Cross, and the Navy Cross.

Admiral Byrd is the only person to have three ticker-tape parades in New York City (in 1926, 1927, and 1930) given in his honor.

Byrd was one of only four American military officers in history entitled to wear a medal with his own image on it. The others were Admiral George Dewey, General John J. Pershing, and Admiral William T. Sampson. As Byrd's image is on both the first and second Byrd Antarctic Expedition Medals, he was the only American entitled to wear two medals with his own image on them.

He was one of the recipients of the Langley Gold Medal, which is awarded by the Smithsonian Institution for outstanding achievement in aviation.

He was the seventh recipient of the prestigious Hubbard Medal awarded by the National Geographic Society for his flight to the North Pole. Other recipients include Robert Peary, Roald Amundsen, and Charles Lindbergh.

Byrd received numerous medals from nongovernmental organizations in honor of his achievements. These included the David Livingstone Centenary Medal of the American Geographical Society, the Loczy Medal of the Hungarian Geographical Society, the Vega Medal of the Swedish Geographical Society, and the Elisha Kent Kane Medal of the Philadelphia Geographical Society.

In 1927, the Boy Scouts of America made Byrd an Honorary Scout, a new category of scout created that same year. This distinction was given to "American citizens whose achievements in outdoor activity, exploration, and worthwhile adventure are of such an exceptional character as to capture the imagination of boys ...".

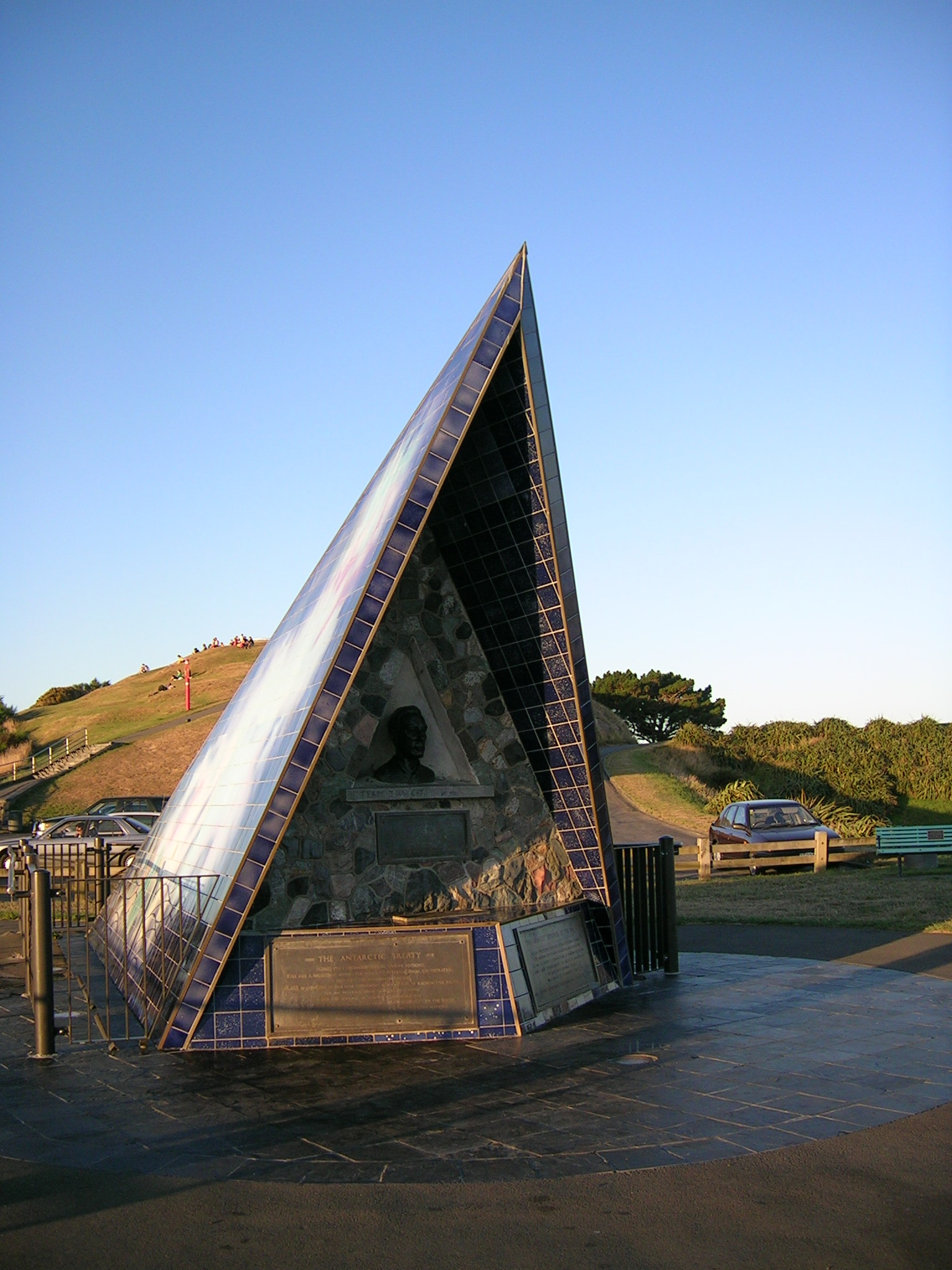
Byrd Memorial on Mount Victoria, New Zealand

Also in 1927 the city of Richmond, Virginia dedicated the Richard Evelyn Byrd Flying Field, now Richmond International Airport, in Henrico County, Virginia. Byrd's Fairchild FC-2W2, NX8006, Stars And Stripes, is on display at the Virginia Aviation Museum located on the north side of the airport, on loan from the National Air and Space Museum in Washington, D.C.

In 1929, Byrd received the Silver Buffalo Award from the Boy Scouts of America. Also in 1929, he received the Langley Gold Medal from the Smithsonian Institution.

Lunar crater Byrd is named after him, as was the United States Navy dry cargo ship USNS Richard E. Byrd (T-AKE-4) and the now decommissioned Charles F. Adams-class guided missile destroyer USS Richard E. Byrd (DDG-23).

In 1930, Byrd was elected to the American Philosophical Society.

In Glen Rock, New Jersey, Richard E. Byrd School was dedicated in 1931.

On March 31, 1934, during a regularly scheduled broadcast, Admiral Byrd was awarded the CBS Medal for Distinguished Contribution to Radio. Byrd's short-wave relay broadcasts, from his second Antarctic expedition, established a new chapter of communication history. Byrd was the sixth individual to receive this award.

50th Anniversary flag of Byrd's historic flight over the South Pole.

The Institute of Polar Studies at the Ohio State University officially changed its name to the Byrd Polar Research Center (BPRC) on January 21, 1987, after it acquired Byrd's expeditionary records, personal papers, and other memorabilia in 1985 from the estate of Marie A. Byrd, the late wife of Admiral Byrd. His papers served as the nucleus for establishment of the BPRC Polar Archival Program in 1990. The Richard Byrd Library, a branch of the Fairfax County Public Library system, opened in Springfield, Virginia in 1958.

Richard E. Byrd Elementary School, a Department of Defense school located in Negishi (Yokohama, Japan) opened on September 20, 1948. The name was changed to R.E. Byrd Elementary School on April 5, 1960.

Memorials to Byrd can be found in two cities in New Zealand (Wellington and Dunedin). Byrd used New Zealand as his departure point for several of his Antarctic expeditions.

The 50th anniversary of Byrd's first flight over the South Pole was commemorated in a set of two postage stamps by Australian Antarctic Territory in 1979, and a commemorative flag was designed.

The long-range short-wave voice transmissions from Byrd's Antarctic expedition in 1934 were named an IEEE Milestone in 2001.

Admiral Richard E. Byrd Middle School, located in Frederick County, Virginia, was opened in 2005, and is decorated with pictures and letters from Byrd's life and career.

He was inducted into Phi Beta Kappa as an honorary member at the University of Virginia.

Byrd was inducted into the International Air and Space Hall of Fame at the San Diego Air and Space Museum in 1968.

In 1981, the Dutch airline KLM named one of its Boeing 747-200s after Admiral Byrd.

Richard E. Byrd Middle School in Sun Valley, California, is named after Admiral Byrd. The school opened in its present location in 2008 after its original location was converted to Sun Valley High School.

== Popular culture ==
Jacques Vallée in his book Confrontations mentions a "spurious story" about "'holes in the pole' allegedly found by Admiral Byrd", when he quotes Clint Chapin of the Copper Medic case as believing the UFOs came from inside the earth.

In Great Circle by Maggie Shipstead, Byrd and the Little America bases are the final stop in Marian Graves' journey to circle the globe by flight over the North and South Poles.

== Military awards ==
Admiral Byrd was one of the most highly decorated officers in the history of the United States Navy. He is, probably, the only individual to receive the Medal of Honor, Navy Cross, Distinguished Flying Cross, and the Silver Life Saving Medal. He also was one of a very few individuals to receive all three Antarctic expedition medals issued for expeditions prior to the Second World War.

=== Decorations and medals ===

Note – The dates on the table below are the year the award was received and not necessarily the year of the actions the award recognizes.

Naval Aviator Badge (1917)
1st Row	Medal of Honor (1926)		
2nd Row	Navy Cross (1929)	Navy Distinguished Service Medal with award star (1926, 1941)	Legion of Merit with award star (1943, 1946)
3rd Row	Distinguished Flying Cross (1927)	Navy Commendation Medal with two stars (1944)	Silver Lifesaving Medal (1914)
4th Row	Byrd Antarctic Expedition Medal issued in Gold (1930)	Second Byrd Antarctic; Expedition Medal (1937)	United States Antarctic; Expedition Medal issued in Gold (1945)
5th Row	Mexican Service Medal (1918)	World War I Victory Medal with commendation star and two campaign clasps (1919)	American Defense Service Medal with service star (1940)
6th Row	European-African-Middle Eastern; Campaign Medal with battle star (1943)	Asiatic-Pacific Campaign Medal with two battle stars (1942)	World War II Victory Medal (1945)
7th Row	Antarctic Service Medal (1960, posthumous)	Commander of the Legion of Honor (1931, France) (Officer in 1927)	Order of Christopher Columbus (1945, Santo Domingo)
8th Row	Commander of the Order of Aviz (1921, Portugal)	Officer, Order of Saints Maurice and Lazarus (c. 1930, Italy)	Officer, Order of Aeronautical Virtue (c. 1930, Romania)

Byrd was posthumously eligible for the Antarctic Service Medal, established in 1960, for his participation in the Antarctic expeditions Operation Highjump (1946 to 1947) and Operation Deep Freeze (1955 to 1956).

Byrd also received numerous other awards from governmental and private entities in the United States.

=== Medal of Honor citation ===
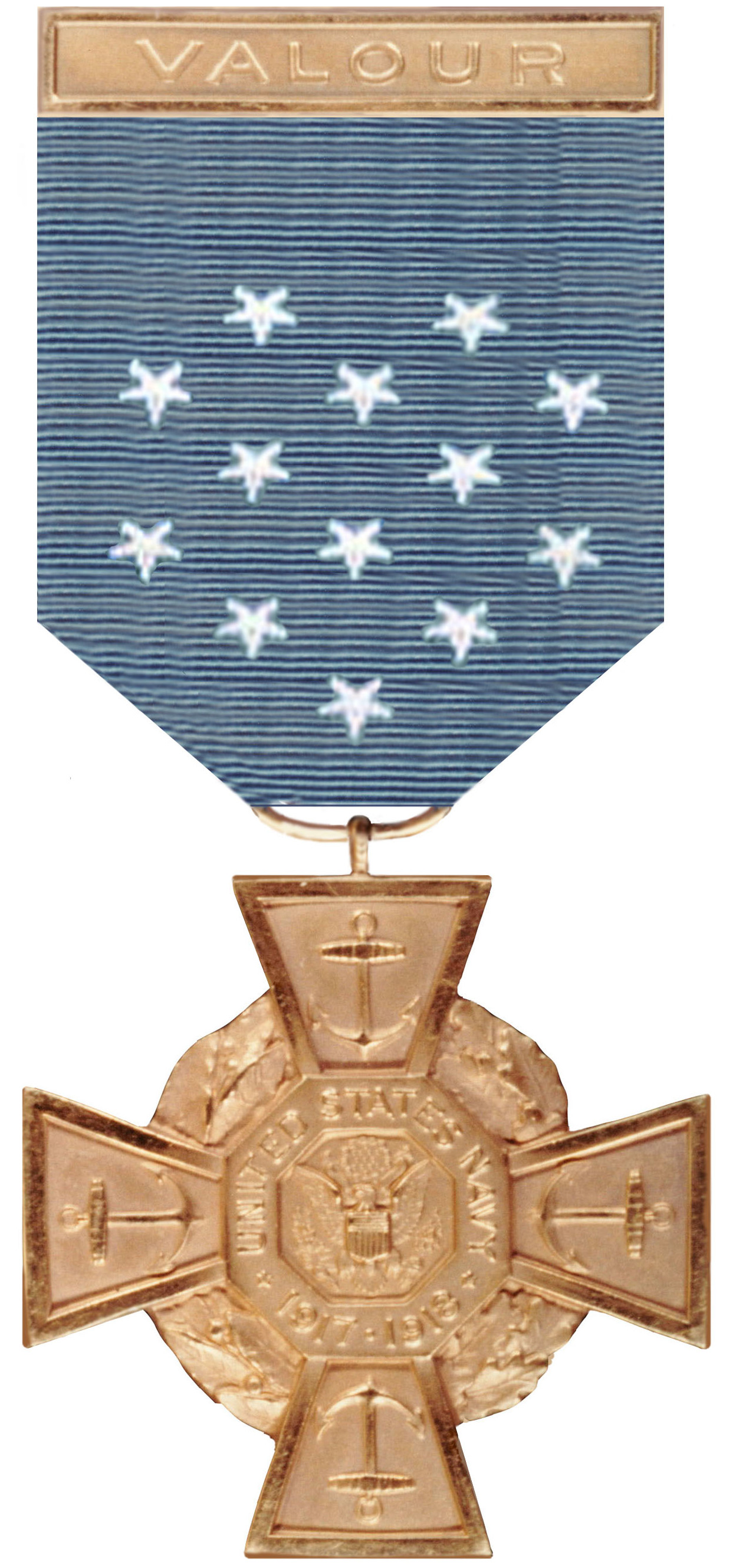

Rank and organization: Commander, United States Navy. Born: October 25, 1888, Winchester, Va. Appointed from: Virginia.

Citation

For distinguishing himself conspicuously by courage and intrepidity at the risk of his life, in demonstrating that it is possible for aircraft to travel in continuous flight from a now inhabited portion of the earth over the North Pole and return.

Byrd, along with Machinist Floyd Bennett, was presented with the Medal of Honor by President Calvin Coolidge on March 5, 1927.

=== Navy Cross citation ===

The President of the United States of America takes pleasure in presenting the Navy Cross to Rear Admiral Richard Evelyn Byrd Jr. (NSN: 0–7918), United States Navy, for extraordinary heroism in the line of his profession as Commanding Officer of the Byrd Antarctic Expedition I, in that on November 28, 1929 he took off in his "Floyd Bennett" from the Expedition's base at Little America, Antarctica and, after a flight made under the most difficult conditions he reached the South Pole on November 29, 1929. After flying some distance beyond this point he returned to his base at Little America. This hazardous flight was made under extreme conditions of cold, over ranges and plateaus extending nine to ten thousand feet above sea level and beyond probable rescue of personnel had a forced landing occurred. Rear Admiral Richard E. Byrd, U.S.N, Retired, was in command of this flight, navigated the airplane, made the mandatory preparations for the flight, and through his untiring energy, superior leadership, and excellent judgment the flight was brought to a successful conclusion.

=== First Distinguished Service Medal citation ===
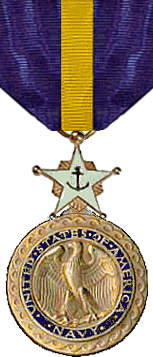

The President of the United States of America takes pleasure in presenting the Navy Distinguished Service Medal to Commander Richard Evelyn Byrd Jr. (NSN: 0–7918), United States Navy, for exceptionally meritorious and distinguished service in a position of great responsibility to the Government of the United States, in demonstrating, by his courage and professional ability that heavier-than-air craft could in continuous flight travel to the North Pole and return.

General Orders: Letter Dated August 6, 1926

=== Second Distinguished Service Medal citation ===
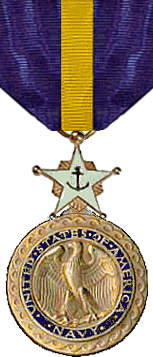

The President of the United States of America takes pleasure in presenting a Gold Star in lieu of a Second Award of the Navy Distinguished Service Medal to Rear Admiral Richard Evelyn Byrd Jr. (NSN: 0–7918), United States Navy, for exceptionally meritorious and distinguished service in a position of great responsibility to the Government of the United States as Commanding Officer of the U.S. Antarctic Service. Rear Admiral Byrd did much toward the difficult task of organizing the expedition, which was accomplished in one fourth of the time generally necessary for such undertakings. In spite of a short operating season, he established two Antarctic bases 1,500 miles apart, where valuable scientific and economic investigations are now being carried on. With the USS Bear, he penetrated unknown and dangerous seas where important discoveries were made; in addition to which he made four noteworthy flights, resulting in the discovery of new mountain ranges, islands, more than a hundred thousand square miles of area, a peninsula and 700 miles of hitherto unknown stretches of the Antarctic coast. The operations of the Antarctic Service have been a credit to the Government of the United States. His qualities of leadership and unselfish devotion to duty are in accordance with the highest traditions of the United States Naval Service.

=== First Legion of Merit citation ===
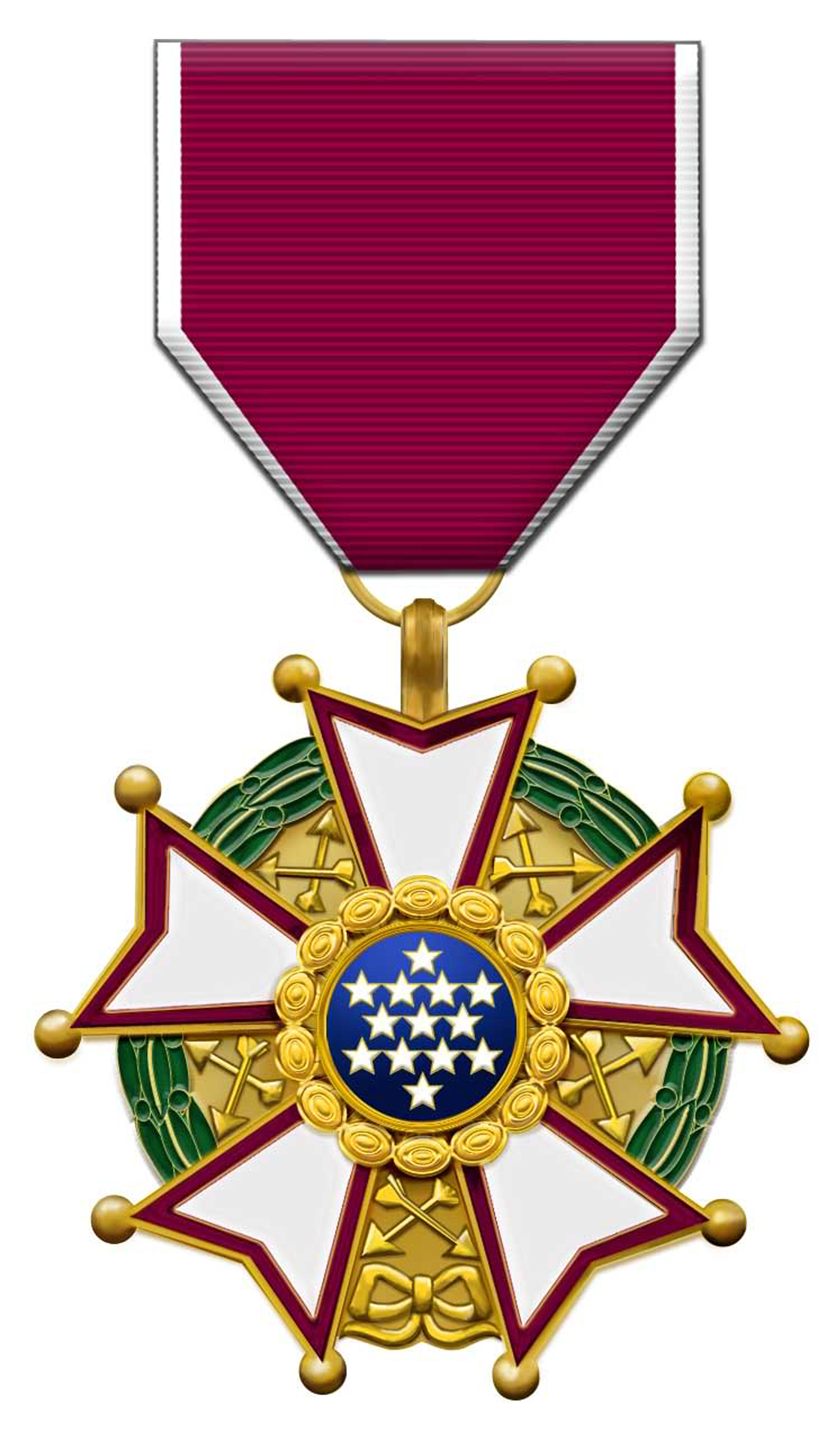

The President of the United States of America takes pleasure in presenting the Legion of Merit to Rear Admiral Richard Evelyn Byrd Jr. (NSN: 0–7918), United States Navy, for exceptionally meritorious conduct in the performance of outstanding services to the Government of the United States while in command of a Special Navy Mission to the Pacific from August 27, 1943, to December 5, 1943, when thirty-three islands of the Pacific were surveyed or investigated for the purpose of recommending air base sites of value to the United States for its defense or for the development of post-war civil aviation. In this service Admiral Byrd exercised fine leadership in gaining the united effort of civilian, Army, and Navy experts. He displayed courage, initiative, vision, and a high order of ability in obtain data and in submitting reports which will be of great present and future value to the National Defense and to the Government of the United States in the post-war period.

Action Date: August 27 – December 5, 1943

=== Second Legion of Merit citation ===
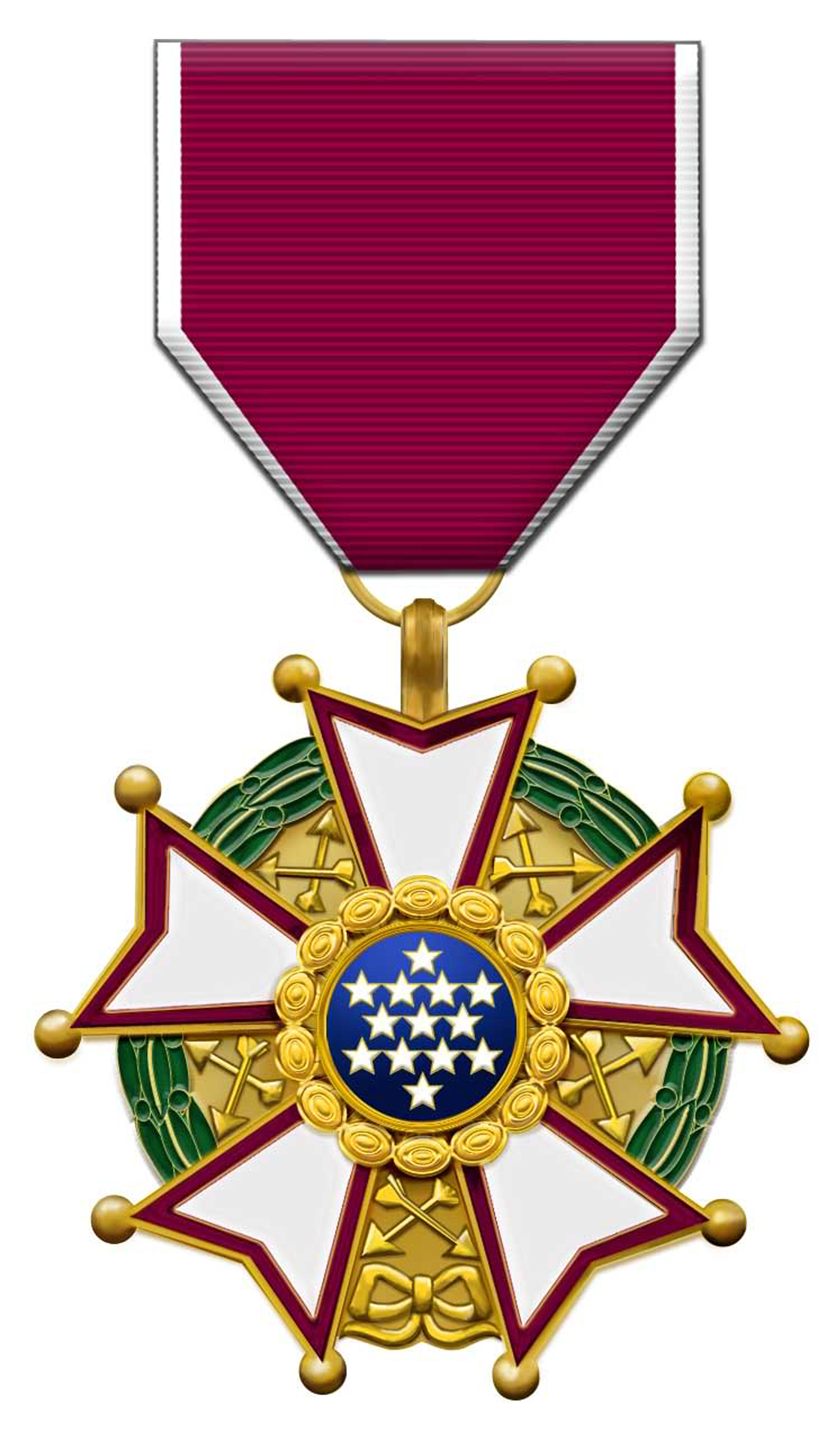

The President of the United States of America takes pleasure in presenting a Gold Star in lieu of a Second Award of the Legion of Merit to Rear Admiral Richard Evelyn Byrd Jr. (NSN: 0–7918), United States Navy, for exceptionally meritorious conduct in the performance of outstanding services to the Government of the United States as Confidential Advisor to the Commander in Chief, United States Fleet and Chief of Naval Operations from March 26, 1942 to May 10, 1942, August 14, 1942 to August 26, 1943, and from December 6, 1943 to October 1, 1945. In the performance of his duty Rear Admiral Byrd served in the Navy Department and in various areas outside the continental limits of the United States, employed on special missions on the fighting fronts in Europe and the Pacific. In all assignments his thoroughness, attention to detail, keen discernment, professional judgment and zeal produced highly successful results. His wise counsel, sound advice and foresight in planning constituted a material contribution to the war effort and to the success of the United States Navy. The performance of duty of Rear Admiral Byrd was at all times in keeping with the highest traditions and reflected credit upon himself and the United States Naval Service.

General Orders: Board Serial 176P00 (February 4, 1946)

Action Date: March 26, 1942 – October 1, 1945

=== Distinguished Flying Cross citation ===
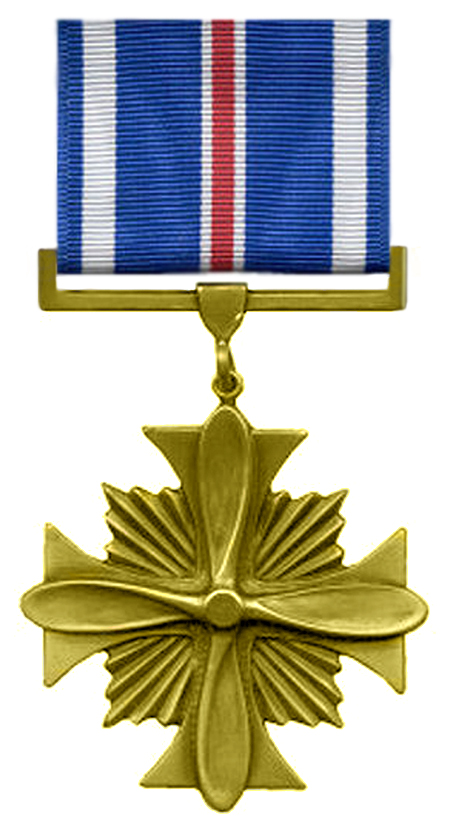

The President of the United States of America takes pleasure in presenting the Distinguished Flying Cross to Commander Richard Evelyn Byrd Jr. (NSN: 0–7918), United States Navy, for extraordinary achievement while participating in aerial flight; in recognition of his courage, resourcefulness and skill as Commander of the expedition which flew the airplane "America" from New York City to France from June 29 to July 1, 1927, across the Atlantic Ocean under extremely adverse weather conditions which made a landing in Paris impossible; and finally for his discernment and courage in directing his plane to a landing at Ver sur Mer, France, without serious injury to his personnel, after a flight of 39 hours and 56 minutes.

Action Date: June 29 – July 1, 1927

=== Letter of Commendation ===
He rendered valuable service as Secretary and Organizer of the Navy Department Commission on Training Camps, and trained men in aviation in the ground school in Pensacola, and in charge of rescue parties and afterwards in charge of air forces in Canada.

— Awarded for service from 1917 to 1918 during World War I.

== Dates of rank ==
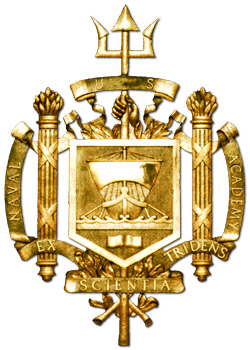
United States Naval Academy Midshipman – May 28, 1908 (Class of 1912)

Ensign	Lieutenant, Junior Grade	Lieutenant
June 8, 1912	June 8, 1915 (Retired on March 15, 1916.)	September 2, 1918

Lieutenant Commander	Commander	Rear Admiral
September 21, 1918 (Temporary. Revoked on December 31, 1921.) February 10, 1925 (Permanent.)	December 21, 1926 By act of Congress. (Date of rank - May 9, 1926.)	December 21, 1929 By act of Congress.

== See also ==
- Adventurers' Club of New York – Adventure-oriented private men's club
- Byrd Canyon – Undersea canyon in Antarctica
- Ford Ranges – Group of mountain ranges in Antarctica
- Laurence McKinley Gould – American geologist and explorer (1896-1995)
- List of Antarctic expeditions
- List of Freemasons
- List of members of the American Legion

== Bibliography ==
- Byrd, Richard Evelyn (1930). Little America. New York: G. P. Putnam Sons.
- Byrd, Richard (1938). Alone. New York: G. P. Putnam's Sons.
- Rodgers, Eugene (1990). Beyond the Barrier: The Story of Byrd's First Expedition to Antarctica. Annapolis, Md.: Naval Institute Press. ISBN 978-1-61251-1887.
- Little America: Aerial Exploration in the Antarctic The Flight to the South Pole (1930)
- Discovery: The Story of the Second Byrd Antarctic Expedition (1935)
- "3c Byrd Antarctic Expedition II President Franklin D. Roosevelt sketch". Smithsonian National Postal Museum.
- "Little America, Antarctica, Post Office" (PDF). United States Postal Service. 2004.

=== Further reading ===
- "The North Pole Flight of Richard E. Byrd: An Overview of the Controversy". Polar Archival Program, Ohio State University. 2007. Archived from the original on October 13, 2007.
- "Richard E. Byrd's 1926 Flight Towards the North Pole" (PDF). October 25, 2007.
- Byrd, Richard Evelyn; Goerler, Raimund Erhard (1998). To the Pole: The Diary and Notebook of Richard E. Byrd, 1925–1927. Ohio State University Press. ISBN 9780814208007.
- "The Flight of the 'America' – 1927". October 25, 2007.
- "Richard E. Byrd 1888–1957". October 25, 2007.
- "A navigation expert's look at how Byrd's claim is one possible interpretation of his diary". October 25, 2007. Archived from the original on September 16, 2009.
- "At the bottom of the World", Popular Mechanics, August 1930, pp. 225–41
