= Transatlantic flight of Alcock and Brown =

First non-stop transatlantic flight (June 1919)

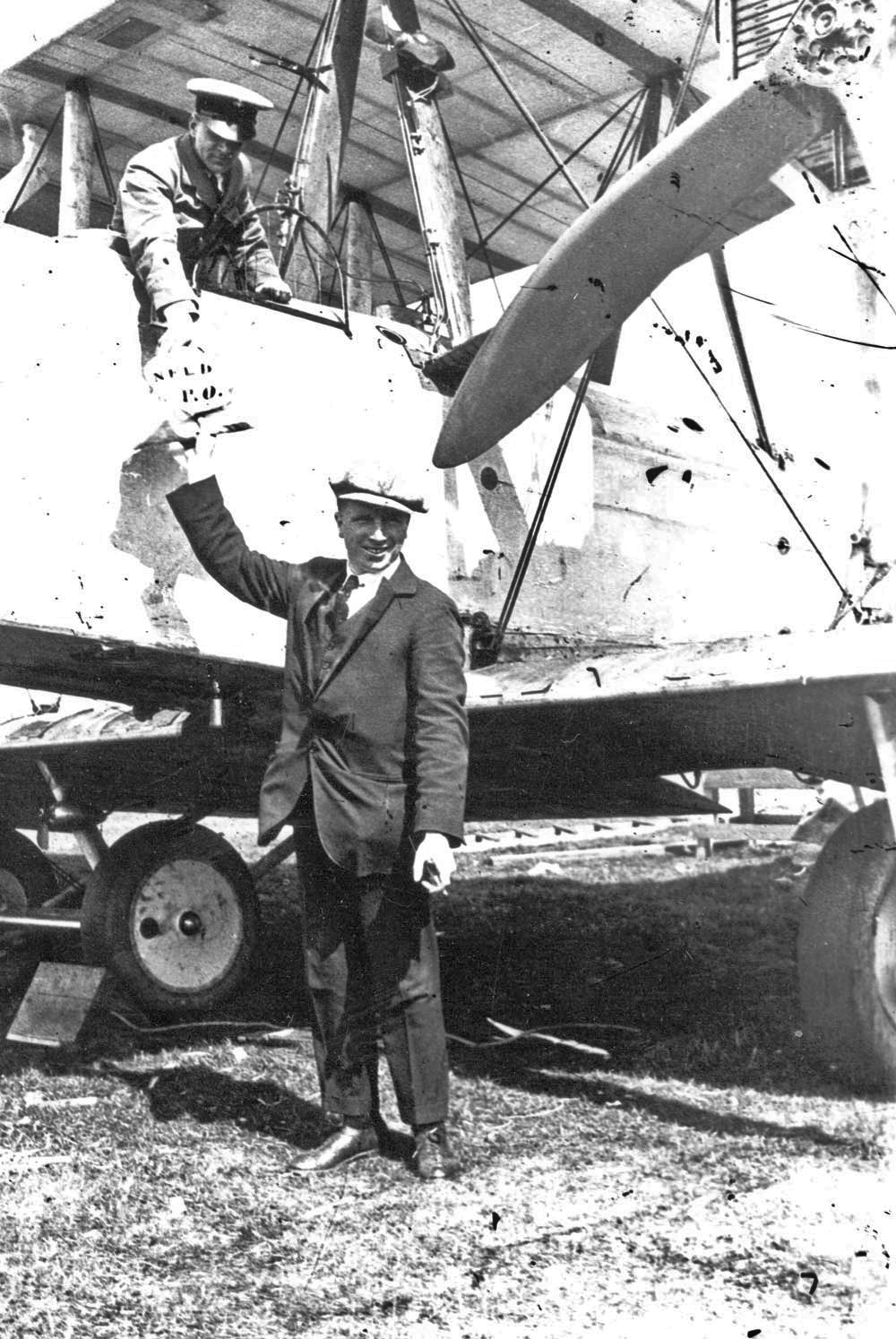
Alcock and Brown taking on mail

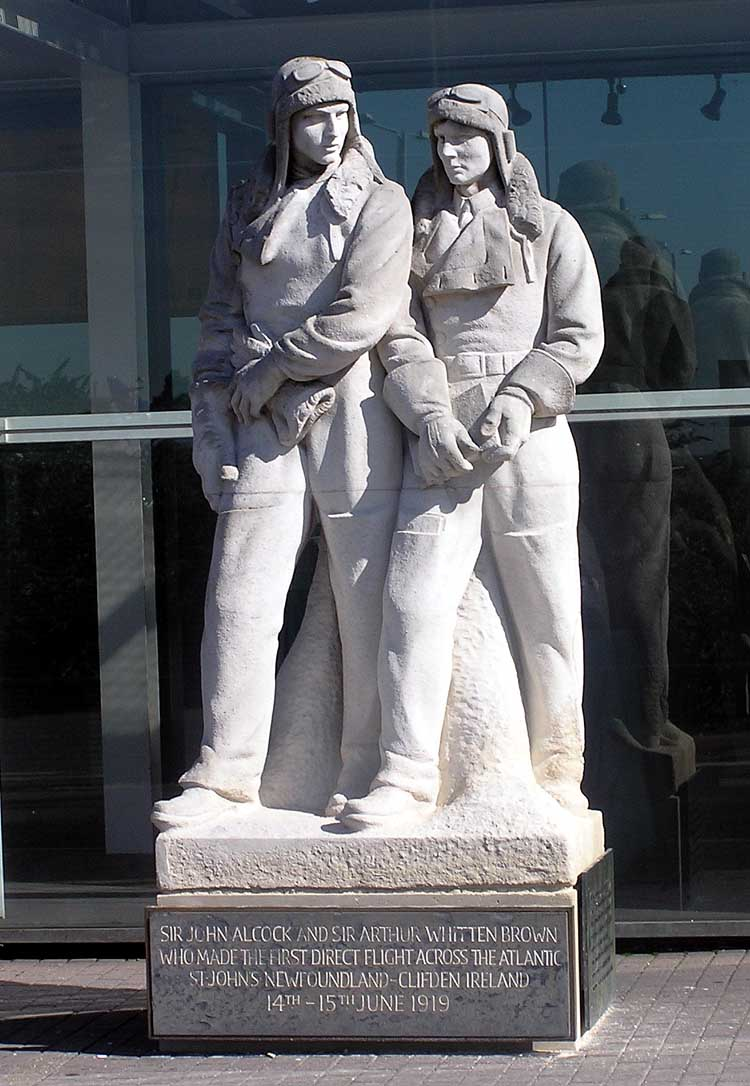
Statue of Alcock and Brown at London Heathrow Airport (now located at Brooklands Museum)an identical statue in Clifden too

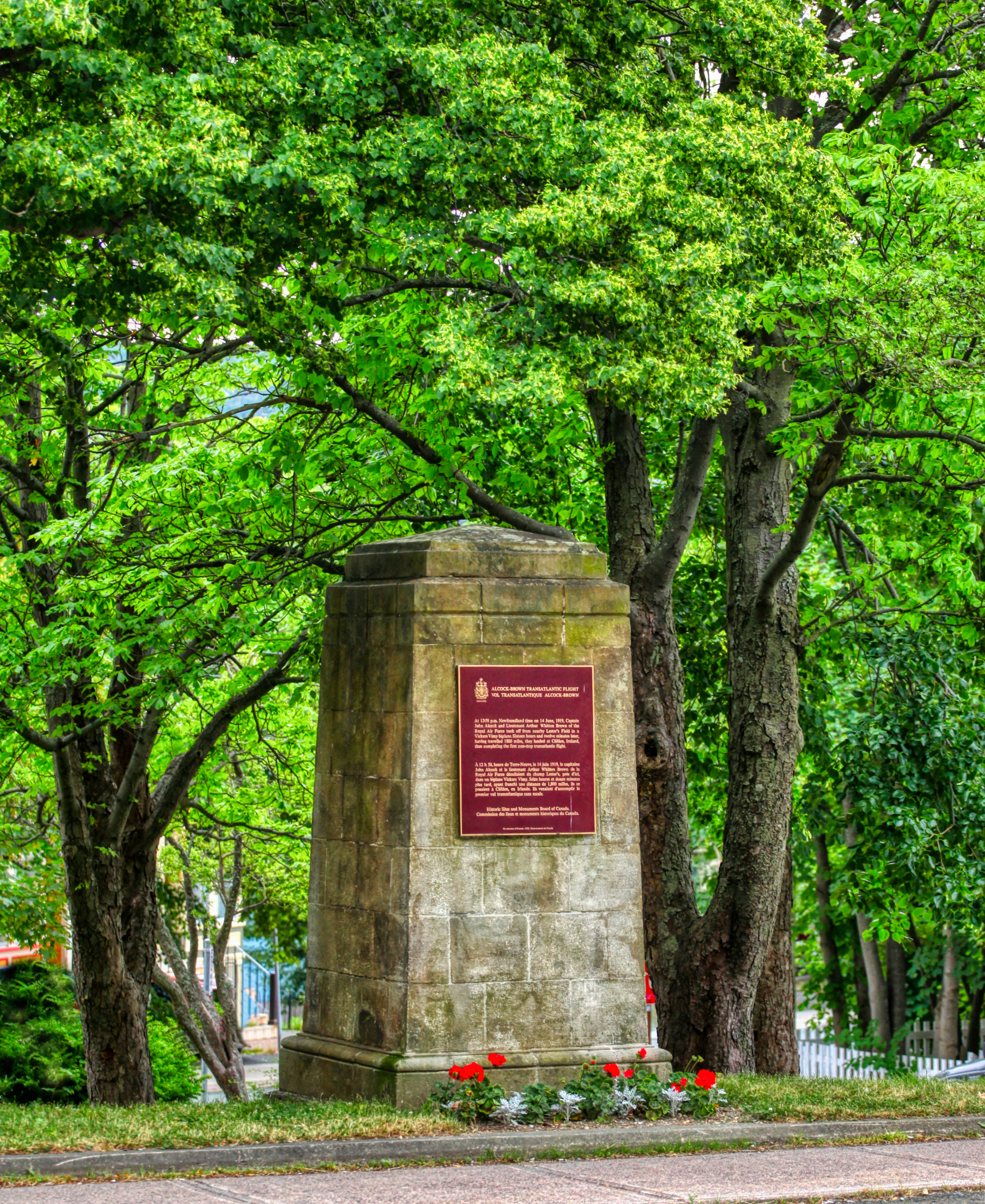
Monument commemorating the flight, near the Lester's Field departure point in St. John's, Newfoundland, Canada

John Alcock and Arthur Brown were British aviators who, in 1919, made the first non-stop transatlantic flight. They flew a modified First World War Vickers Vimy bomber from St. John's, Newfoundland, to Clifden, County Galway, Ireland. The Secretary of State for Air, Winston Churchill, presented them with the Daily Mail prize of £10,000 (equivalent to £450,000 in 2025) for the first crossing of the Atlantic Ocean by aeroplane in "less than 72 consecutive hours". The flight carried nearly 200 letters, the first transatlantic airmail. The two aviators were knighted by King George V at Windsor Castle a week later.

== Background ==
John Alcock was born in 1892 in Basford House on Seymour Grove, Firswood, Manchester, England. Known to his family and friends as "Jack", he first became interested in flying at the age of seventeen and gained his pilot's licence in November 1912. Alcock was a regular competitor in aircraft competitions at Hendon in 1913–14. He became a military pilot during the First World War and was taken prisoner in Turkey after his Handley Page bomber was shot down over the sea. After the war, Alcock wanted to continue his flying career and took up the challenge of direct flight across the Atlantic.

Arthur Whitten Brown was born in Glasgow, Scotland, with American parents in 1886 and shortly afterwards the family moved to Manchester. Known to his family and friends as "Teddie", he began his career in engineering before the outbreak of the First World War.

In April 1913 the London newspaper the Daily Mail offered a prize of £10,000 to:

...the aviator who shall first cross the Atlantic in an aeroplane in flight from any point in the United States of America, Canada or Newfoundland to any point in Great Britain or Ireland in 72 continuous hours.

The competition was suspended with the outbreak of war in 1914 but reopened after Armistice was declared in 1918.

Brown became a prisoner of war after being shot down over Germany. Alcock, too, was imprisoned and had resolved to fly the Atlantic one day. As Brown continued developing his aerial navigation skills, Alcock approached the Vickers engineering and aviation firm at Weybridge, who had considered entering their Vickers Vimy IV twin-engined bomber in the competition but had not yet found a pilot. The Vimy had originally been manufactured at Vickers in Crayford, the first twelve being made there and tested at Joyce Green airfield, Dartford. It was a great inconvenience to have to dismantle the aircraft to move them to Joyce Green so production was moved to Weybridge. The thirteenth Vimy assembled was the one used for the trans-Atlantic crossing. Alcock said 13 was his lucky number. Sir Henry Norman was involved in the detailed planning for a proposed transatlantic flight using the Vimy. This planning included the route to be flown, hangar facilities and the provision of the fuel needed.

Alcock's enthusiasm impressed the Vickers' team and he was appointed as their pilot. Work began on converting the Vimy for the long flight, replacing the bomb racks with extra petrol tanks. Shortly afterwards, Brown, who was unemployed, approached Vickers seeking a post and his knowledge of long-distance navigation persuaded them to take him on as Alcock's navigator.

== Flight ==
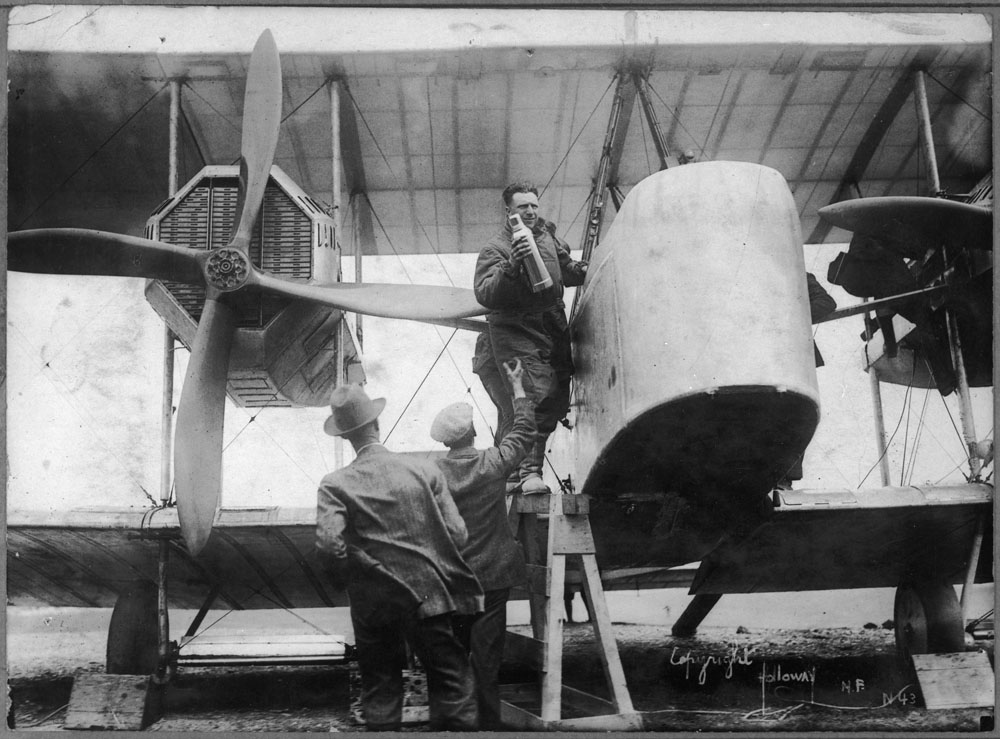
Captain John Alcock stowing provisions aboard Vickers Vimy aircraft before trans-Atlantic flight 14 Jun 1919

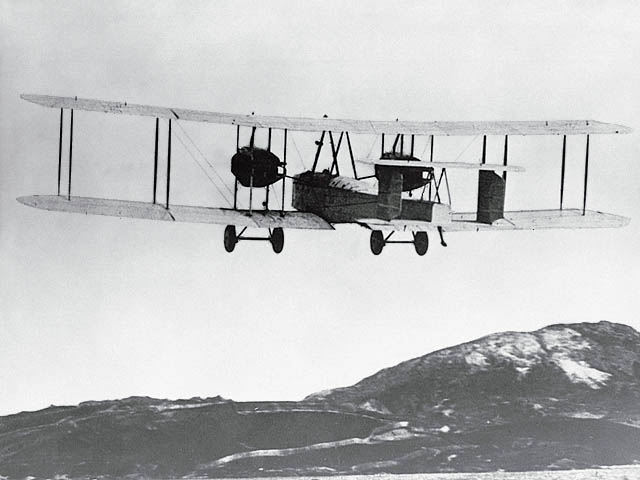
The Alcock and Brown Vimy after take-off from Newfoundland

Contemporary drawing of flight path and plane

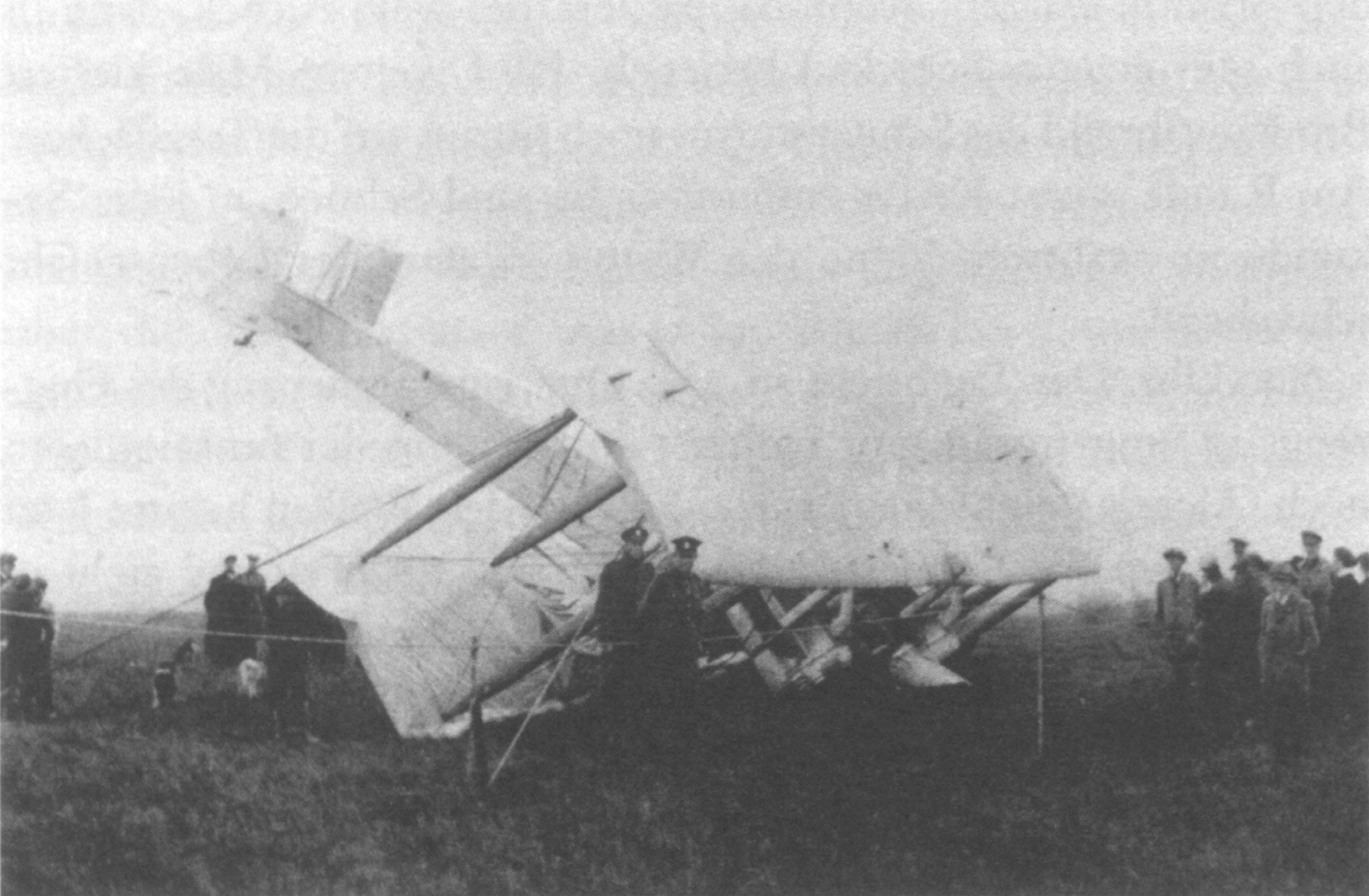
The Vimy after arrival in Ireland. While the touchdown had been smooth, the plane had landed on a peat bog and not grass as Alcock had thought, and it eventually sank axle-deep, pivoting over its wheels.

Several teams had entered the competition and, when Alcock and Brown arrived in St. John's, Newfoundland, the Handley Page team were in the final stages of testing their aircraft for the flight, but their leader, Admiral Mark Kerr, was determined not to take off until it was in perfect condition. The Vickers team quickly assembled their aircraft and, at around 1:45 p.m. on 14 June 1919 the Vimy took off from Lester's Field. Alcock and Brown flew the modified Vickers Vimy, powered by two Rolls-Royce Eagle 360 hp engines which were supported by an on-site Rolls-Royce team led by engineer Eric Platford. The pair brought toy cat mascots with them for the flight – Alcock had 'Lucky Jim' while Brown had 'Twinkletoes'.

It was not an easy flight. The heavily loaded aircraft had difficulty taking off from the rough field and only just cleared the tops of the trees. At 17:20 the wind-driven electrical generator failed, depriving them of radio contact, their intercom and heating. An exhaust pipe burst shortly afterwards, causing a frightening noise which made conversation impossible with a failed intercom.

At 5:00 p.m. they encountered thick fog, preventing Brown from being able to navigate using his sextant. Blind flying in fog or cloud is hazardous without gyroscopic instruments, which they did not have. Alcock twice lost control of the aircraft and nearly hit the sea after a spiral dive. He also had to deal with a broken trim control which made the plane become very nose-heavy as fuel was consumed.

At 12:15 a.m., Brown got a glimpse of the stars and, able to use his sextant, found that they were on course. The generator had failed, denying power to their electric heating suits, leaving them very cold in the open cockpit.

Then, at 3:00 a.m., they flew into a large snowstorm. They were drenched by rain, their instruments iced up, and the aircraft was in danger of icing and becoming unflyable. The carburettors also iced up; it has been said that Brown had to climb out onto the wings to clear the engines, although he made no mention of that.

They made landfall in County Galway and landed at 8:40 a.m. on 15 June 1919, not far from their intended landing place, after less than sixteen hours' flying time. The aircraft was damaged upon arrival because they landed on what appeared from the air to be a suitable green field, but which turned out to be Derrigimlagh Bog, near Clifden in County Galway in Ireland. This caused the aircraft to nose-over, although neither of the airmen was hurt. Brown said that if the weather had been good, they could have pressed on to London.

Their altitude varied between sea level and 12,000 ft (3,700 m). They took off with 865 imperial gallons (3,900 L) of fuel. They crossed the coast at 4:28 pm, having spent around fourteen-and-a-half hours over the North Atlantic, flying 1,890 miles (3,040 km) in 15 hours 57 minutes at an average speed of 115 mph (185 km/h; 100 knots). Their first interview was given to Tom 'Cork' Kenny of The Connacht Tribune.

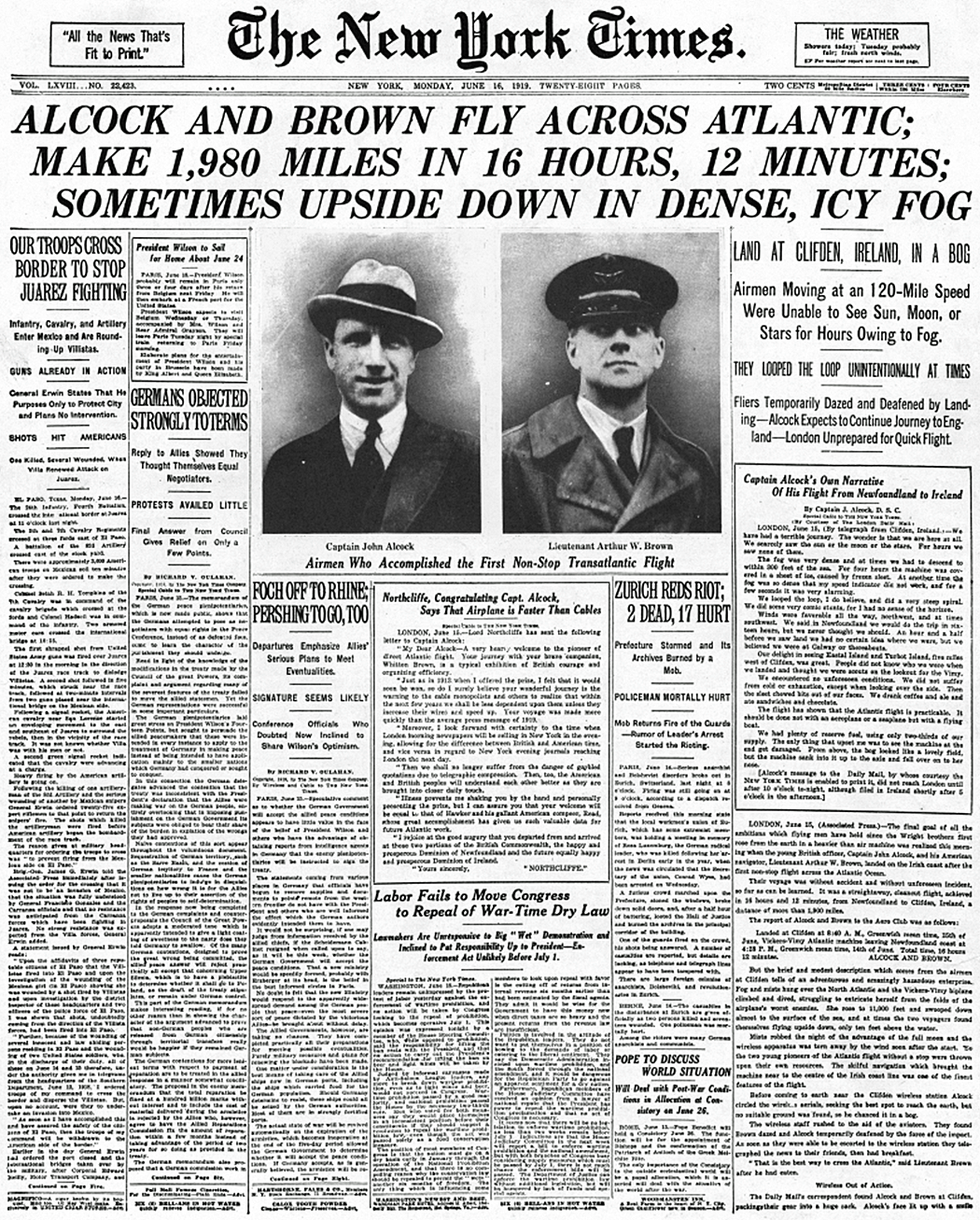
Front page of The New York Times, 16 June 1919

Alcock and Brown were treated as heroes on the completion of their flight. Crowds in Ireland cheered them at each train station on their way to Dublin. Arriving in Britain by boat, they were mobbed at Holyhead, and planes escorted their train journey to London where a quarter of a million people lined the streets to watch their arrival. On the same day they landed, 15 June, the Secretary of State for Air, Winston Churchill, presented them with the Daily Mail prize of £10,000 for their historic crossing of the Atlantic. In addition, Alcock received 2,000 guineas (£2,100) from the State Express Cigarette Company and £1,000 from Laurence R Philipps for being the first Briton to fly the Atlantic Ocean. Both men were knighted a week later by King George V at Windsor Castle.

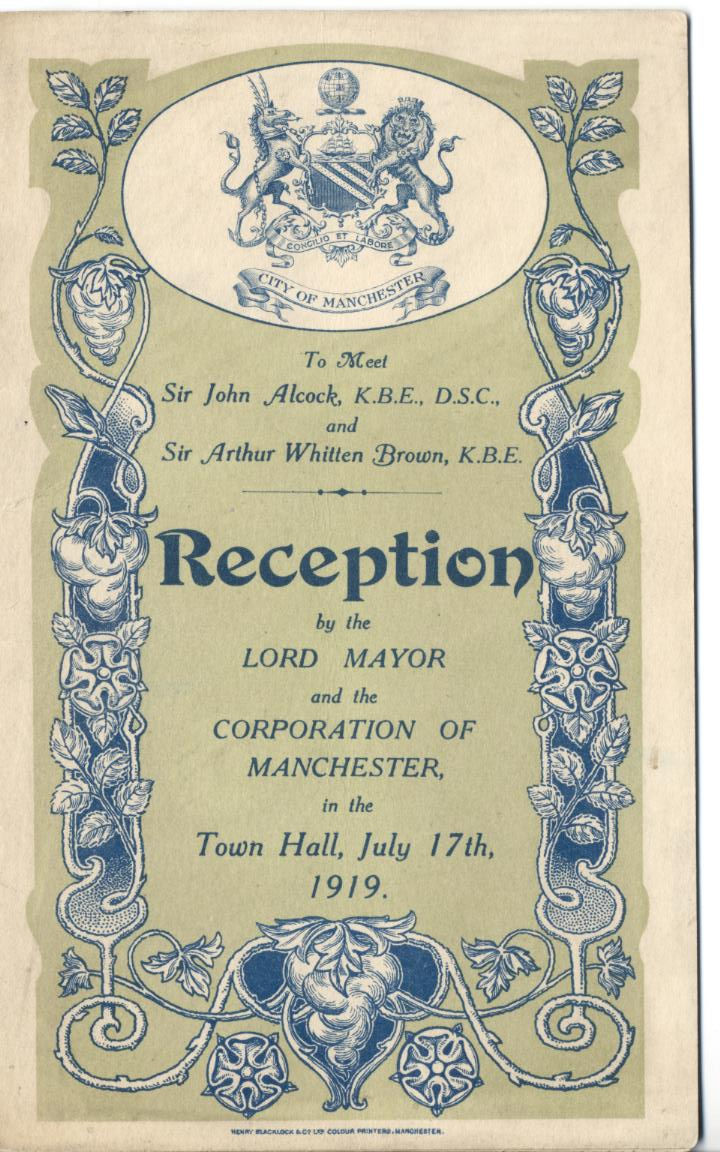
Cover Alcock and Brown flew to Manchester on 17 July 1919, where they were given a civic reception by the Lord Mayor and Corporation, and awards to mark their achievement.

Alcock and Brown flew to Manchester on 17 July 1919, where they were given a civic reception by the Lord Mayor and Corporation, and awards to mark their achievement.

=== Memorials ===
Alcock was killed on 18 December 1919 when he crashed near Rouen whilst flying the new Vickers Viking amphibian to the Paris Airshow. Brown died on 4 October 1948.

Two memorials commemorating the flight are sited near the landing spot in County Galway, Ireland. The first is an isolated cairn four kilometres south of Clifden on the site of Marconi's first transatlantic wireless station from which the aviators transmitted their success to London, and around 1,600 feet (500 m) from the spot where they landed. In addition, there is a sculpture of an aircraft's tail fin on Errislannan Hill two kilometres north of their landing spot, dedicated on the fortieth anniversary of their landing, 15 June 1959.

Three monuments mark the flight's starting point in Newfoundland. One was erected by the Government of Canada in 1952 at the junction of Lemarchant Road and Patrick Street in St. John's, a second monument is located on Lemarchant Road, while the third was unveiled by Premier of Newfoundland and Labrador Joey Smallwood on Blackmarsh Road.

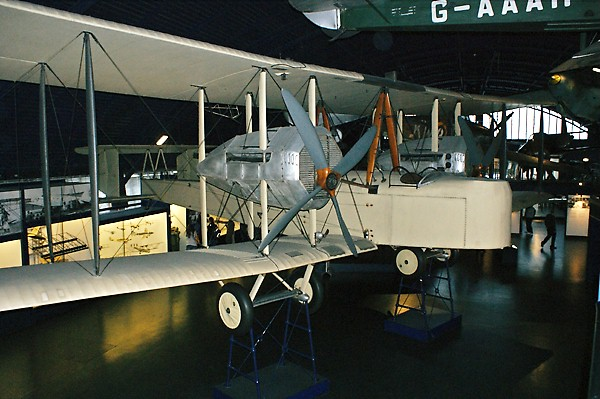
Alcock and Brown's Vickers Vimy in the Science Museum, London

A memorial statue by sculptor William McMillan was erected at London Heathrow Airport in 1954 to celebrate their flight. The statue was taken to Ireland as part of the centenary celebrations in 2019 before being relocated at Brooklands Museum, where it was formally unveiled in February 2020. There is also a monument at Manchester Airport, less than 8 miles from John Alcock's birthplace. Their aircraft (rebuilt by the Vickers Company) is located in the Science Museum in South Kensington, London.

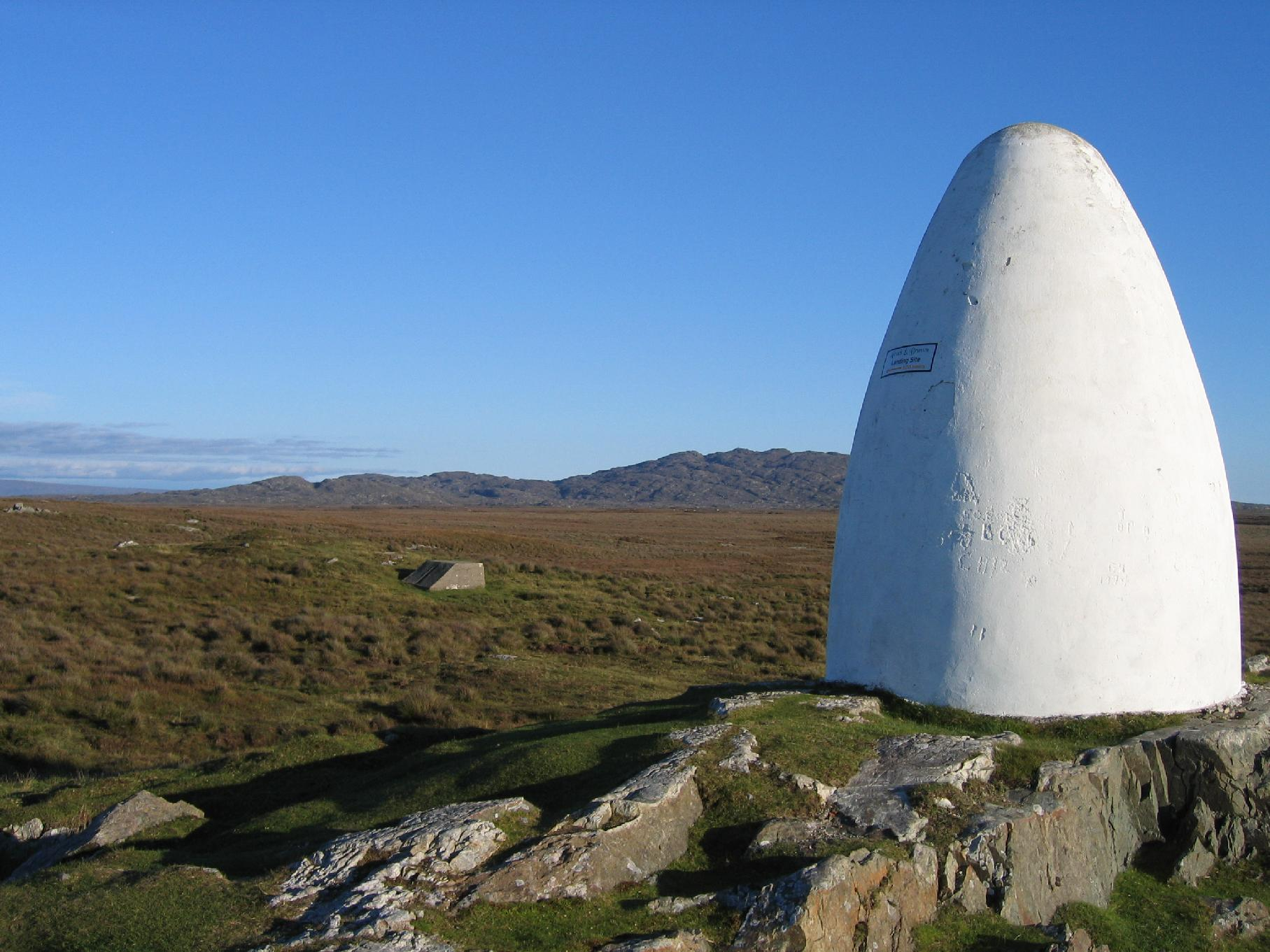
Landing site, County Galway

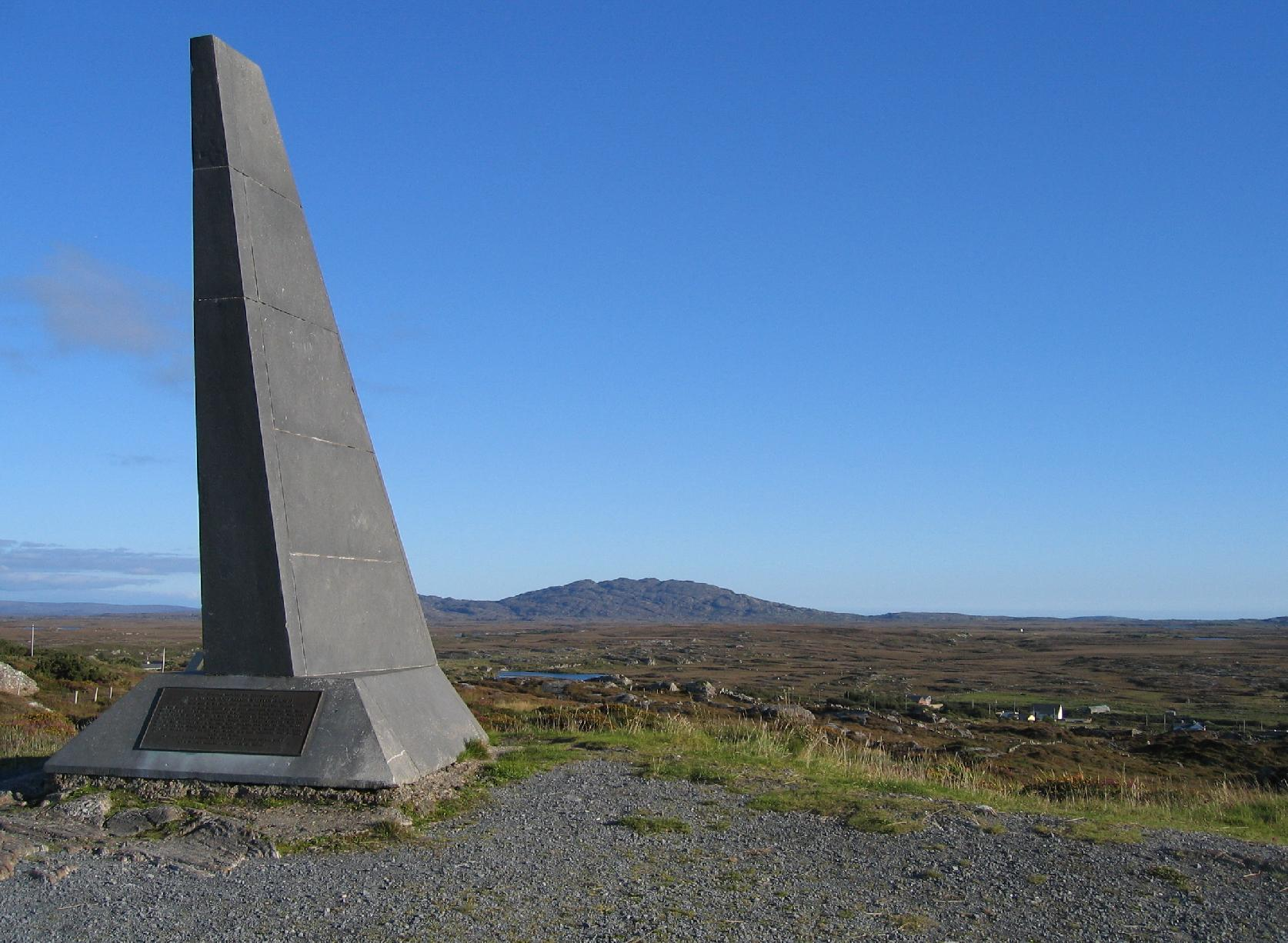
Tail fin memorial, County Galway

The Royal Mail issued a 5d (approximately 2.1p in modern UK currency) stamp commemorating the 50th anniversary of the flight on 2 April 1969. In June 2019, the Central Bank of Ireland issued 3,000 €15 silver commemorative coins, commemorating the 100th anniversary of the flight.

From April to October 2019 various events were held in Crayford and Bexley to commemorate the Centenary of the flight, and the visit of Alcock and Brown to Crayford in July 1919 when they were surprise guests at the reopening of The Princesses Theatre by the Duke of York (later King George VI). The events included talks, exhibitions, a celebration day at Hall Place and Gardens attended by c3,500 people, and chiefly a visit by the Duke of Kent to unveil a new bench in the centre of Crayford with a life-size Alcock and Brown seated at each end, and to view public artwork designed by local schools.

=== Memorabilia ===
On 19 March 2017 an edition of Antiques Roadshow was broadcast in the UK in which the granddaughter of Alcock's cousin presented a handwritten note which was carried by Alcock on the flight. The note, which was valued at £1,000–£1,200, read as follows:

My Dear Elsie
Just a hurried line before
I start. This letter will travel with
me in the official mail bag, the
first mail to be carried over the
Atlantic. Love to all,
Your loving Brother
Jack

== Other crossings ==
Two weeks before Alcock and Brown's flight, the first 'stopping' flight of the Atlantic had been made by the NC-4, a United States Navy flying boat, commanded by Lt. Commander Albert Cushing Read, who flew from Naval Air Station Rockaway, New York to Plymouth with a crew of five, over 23 days, with six stops along the way. This flight was not eligible for the Daily Mail prize since it took more than 72 consecutive hours and also because more than one aircraft was used in the attempt.

A month after Alcock and Brown's achievement, British airship R34 made the first double crossing of the Atlantic. Leaving England on 2 July, it arrived on 4 July carrying 31 people (one a stowaway) and a cat. For the return flight, 29 of this crew, plus two flight engineers and a different American observer, returned to Europe.

On 2–3 July 2005, American adventurer Steve Fossett and co-pilot Mark Rebholz recreated the Alcock and Brown flight in a replica of the Vickers Vimy aeroplane. They did not land in the bog near Clifden, but a few miles away on the Connemara golf course.

A replica Vimy, NX71MY, was built in Australia and the US in 1994 for an American, Peter McMillan, who flew it from England to Australia with Australian Lang Kidby in 1994 to re-enact the first England-Australia flight by Ross & Keith Smith with Vimy G-EAOU in 1919. In 1999, Mark Rebholz and John LaNoue re-enacted the first flight from London to Cape Town with this same replica, and in late 2006 the aeroplane was donated to Brooklands Museum at Weybridge, Surrey. After making a special Alcock and Brown 90th anniversary return visit to Clifden in June 2009 (flown by John Dodd and Clive Edwards), and some final public flying displays at the Goodwood Revival that September, the Vimy made its final flight on 15 November 2009 from Dunsfold Park to Brooklands crewed by John Dodd (pilot), Clive Edwards and Peter McMillan. It is now on public display as the centre-piece of a new 'First to the Fastest' Transatlantic flight exhibition in the Museum's Vimy Pavilion but is maintained as a 'live' aeroplane and occasionally performs engine ground running demonstrations outside.

One of the propellers from the Vickers Vimy was given to Arthur Whitten Brown and hung for many years on the wall of his office in Swansea before he presented it to the RAF College Cranwell. It is believed to have been displayed in the RAF Careers Office in Holborn until 1990. It is believed to be in use today as a ceiling fan in Luigi Malone's Restaurant in Cork, Ireland.

The other propeller, serial number G1184.N6, was originally given to the Vickers Works Manager at Brooklands, Percy Maxwell Muller and displayed for many years suspended inside the transatlantic terminal (Terminal 3) at London's Heathrow Airport. In October 1990 it was donated by the BAA (via its former chairman, Sir Peter Masefield) to Brooklands Museum, where it is now displayed as part of a full-size Vimy wall mural in the Vickers Building.

A small amount of mail, 196 letters and a parcel, was carried on Alcock and Brown's flight, the first time mail was carried by air across the ocean. The government of the Dominion of Newfoundland overprinted stamps for this carriage with the inscription "Transatlantic air post 1919".

Upon landing in Paris after his own record-breaking flight in 1927, Charles Lindbergh told the crowd welcoming him that "Alcock and Brown showed me the way!"

=== RAF 60th anniversary crossing in 1979 ===
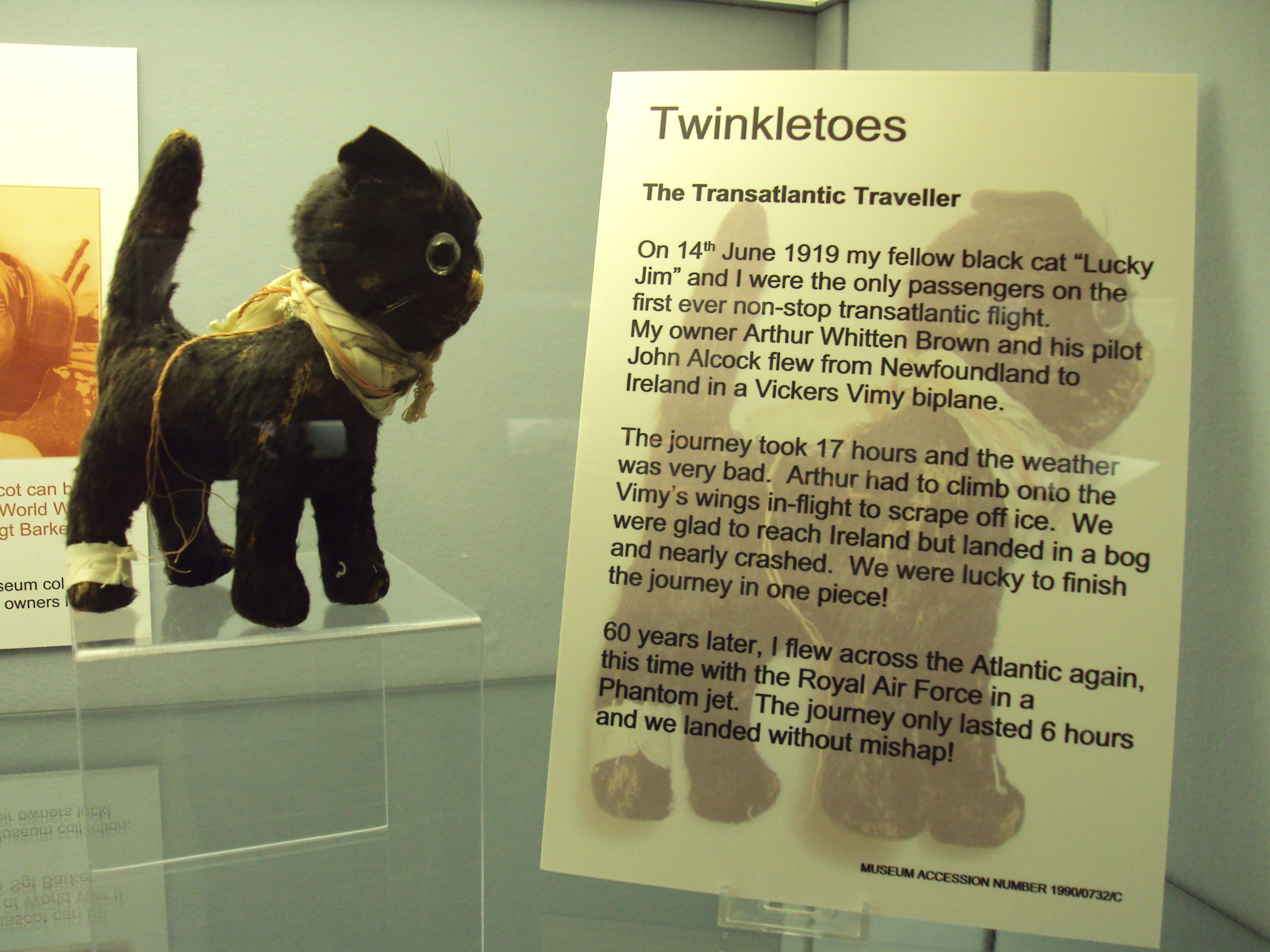
Brown's toy cat mascot 'Twinkletoes' which crossed the Atlantic in 1919 and also on the 60th anniversary flight in 1979.

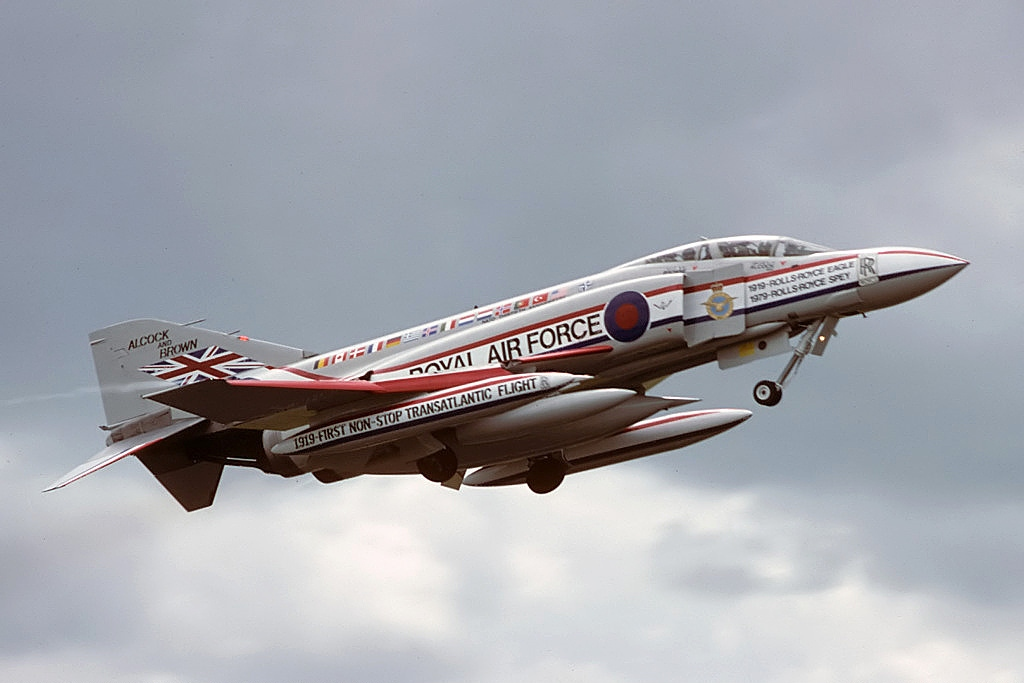
RAF Phantom FGR.2 (XV424) in 60th Anniversary scheme photographed at RIAT 1979, three weeks after making the commemorative crossing.

To mark the original transatlantic crossing, on 1 June 1979 two Royal Air Force McDonnell Douglas Phantom FGR.2s – XV424 (of No. 56 Squadron) and (RAF Coningsby based) XV486, were painted in special commemorative schemes. The scheme was designed by aviation artist Wilfred Hardy. As well as marking the anniversary of the crossing, the scheme also made reference to the usage of Rolls-Royce engines in both aircraft: the Rolls-Royce Eagle in the Vimy and the Rolls-Royce Spey in the Phantom FGR.2, and on top of this it also marked the 30th anniversary of North Atlantic Treaty Organization (NATO).

It was decided that XV424 would make the flight and that XV486 would serve as backup. On 19 June, XV424 departed from RAF St Athan to CFB Goose Bay from where the crossing would be made. The crew chosen for the crossing were: Squadron Leader A. J. N. "Tony" Alcock (pilot and nephew of Sir John Alcock who made the original crossing) and Flight Lieutenant W. N. "Norman" Browne (navigator). For the journey the pair took with them Brown's original cat toy mascot 'Twinkletoes.'

On 21 June, XV424 took off from Goose Bay, Labrador and began the crossing to Ireland. Flying subsonically the entire time, the journey took 5 hours and 40 minutes, setting a new record. The Phantom was refuelled five times throughout by Handley-Page Victor K.2 tankers of No. 57 Squadron. XV424 today is preserved at the RAF Museum in Hendon, sporting colours of No. 56 (Fighter) Squadron, while XV486 was scrapped in 1993.

== See also ==
- Curtiss NC-4 – First transatlantic flight via Azores to Portugal
- Daily Mail Trans-Atlantic Air Race – An event to celebrate the 50th anniversary of the flight
- Felixstowe Fury – Contender for the transatlantic crossing
- List of firsts in aviation
- R34 (airship) – First airship transatlantic crossing, also first east–west crossing
- Timeline of aviation
