= Tom 'Cork' Kenny =

Irish newspaper founder

Tom 'Cork' Kenny, (c. 1880 – c. 1940) was an Irish journalist, editor and founder of the Connacht Tribune.

Kenny was a native of County Cork who moved to Galway early in the 1900s. He established the Connacht Tribune newspaper in 1909, which has been in print ever since. In 1919, he managed to reach Derrygimlagh bog before the correspondent of the Daily Mail, who had been waiting for the arrival of Alcock and Brown. Kenny instead made his way out to Clifden and sold his scoop internationally.

His son, Desmond Kenny, and his wife, Maureen Canning of Mohill, County Leitrim, were the founders of Kenny's Bookshop and Art Gallery, which opened in 1942.
