= John Alcock (RAF officer) =

British aviator (1892–1919)

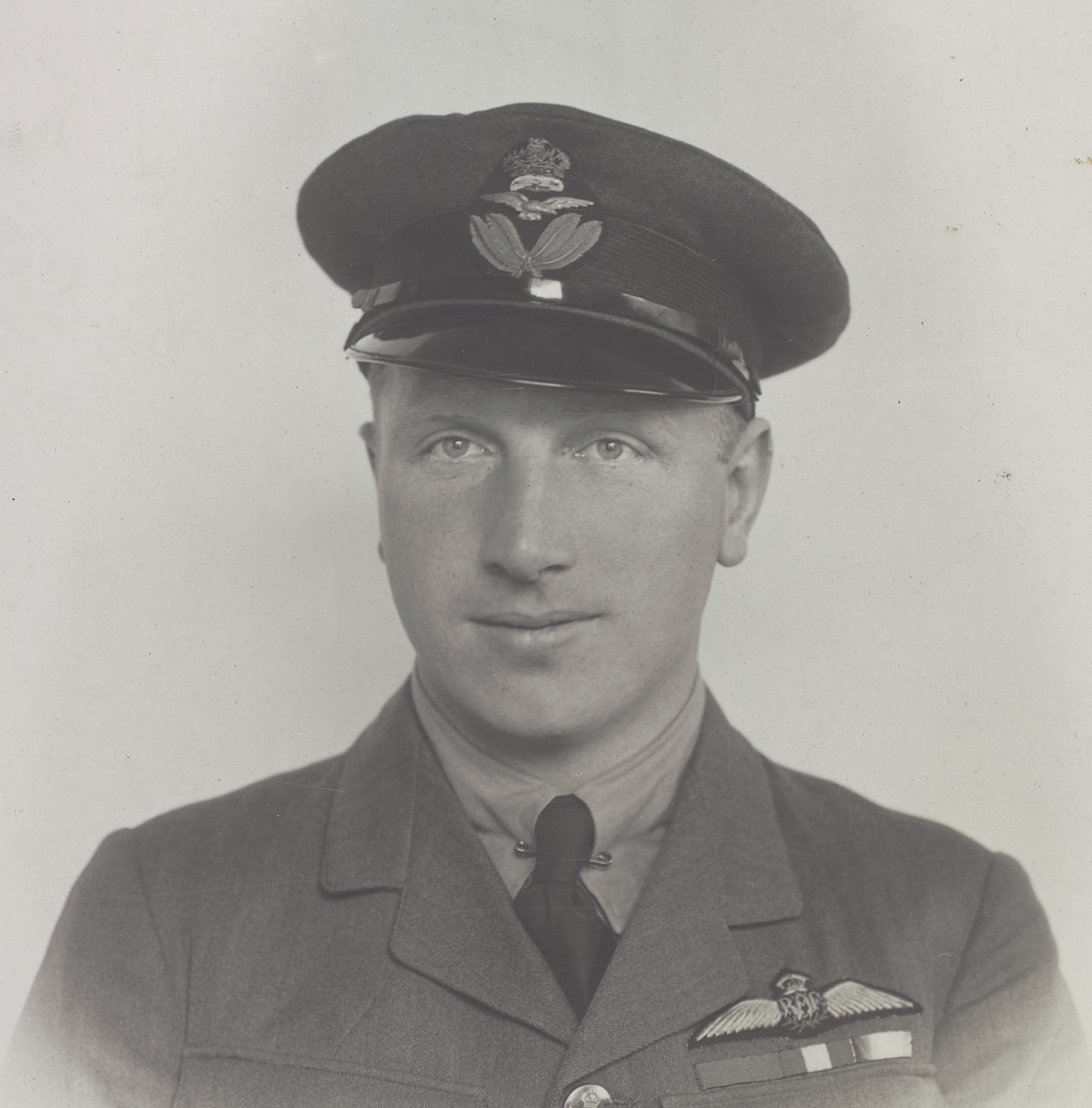
- Born: 5 November 1892; Seymour Grove, Stretford, England,
- Died: 19 December 1919 (aged 27); Cottévrard, near Rouen, Normandy, France
- Burial place: Southern Cemetery, Manchester
- Military career
- Allegiance: United Kingdom
- Branch: Royal Navy (Royal Naval Air Service), Royal Air Force
- Service years: 1914–1919
- Rank: Captain
- Awards: Order of the British Empire; Distinguished Service Cross; Britannia Trophy (posthumous)

Captain Sir John William Alcock KBE DSC (5 November 1892 – 19 December 1919) was a British Royal Navy and later Royal Air Force officer who, with navigator Lieutenant Arthur Whitten Brown, piloted the first non-stop transatlantic flight from St. John's, Newfoundland to Clifden, Ireland in June 1919. He died in a flying accident in France in December later that same year.

== Early life ==
John Alcock was born on 5 November 1892, perhaps in the coach-house adjoining Basford House on Seymour Grove, Firswood, Manchester, England.

His family lived for eight years in Lytham. He attended Heyhouses School in Lytham St. Annes, from 24 April 1900 to 5 April 1905.

His father worked for Sir Edward Hulton's Press. His family moved to 6 Kingswood Road in Ladybarn, Fallowfield. His father died on 14 January 1943.

His brother ESJ Alcock, who attended Manchester Grammar School, became the chief flying instructor of BOAC, in the late 1940s, and had learned to fly with his brother, and later lived at Lytham St Annes. Albert, another brother, later lived in Prestwich.

He first became interested in flying at the age of 17. His first job was at the Empress Motor Works in Manchester. In 1910 he became an assistant to Works Manager Charles Fletcher, an early Manchester aviator and Norman Crossland, a motor engineer and founder of Manchester Aero Club. It was during this period that Alcock met the Frenchman Maurice Ducrocq who was both a demonstration pilot and UK sales representative for aero engines made by the Italian Spirito Mario Viale.

Ducrocq took Alcock on as a mechanic at the Brooklands aerodrome, Surrey, where he learned to fly at Ducrocq's flying school, gaining his pilot's licence there in November 1912. Alcock then joined the Sunbeam Motor Car Company as a racing pilot. By summer 1914 he was proficient enough to compete in a Hendon-Birmingham-Manchester and return air race, flying a Farman biplane. He landed at Trafford Park Aerodrome and flew back to Hendon the same day.

== Military career ==
At the beginning of World War I, Alcock joined the Royal Naval Air Service as a warrant-officer instructor at the Royal Naval Flying School at Eastchurch in Kent. It was whilst at Eastchurch that Alcock received his commission as a flight sub-lieutenant in December 1915. In 1916 he was transferred to a squadron operating at Moudros, on the Greek island of Lemnos. While stationed at Moudros he conceived and built the Alcock Scout, a fighter aircraft built out of the remnants of unused and abandoned aircraft.

On 30 September 1917, whilst piloting a Sopwith Camel, Alcock attacked three enemy aircraft, forcing two to crash into the sea. For this action he was awarded the Distinguished Service Cross. After returning to base he then piloted a Handley Page bomber on a strategic bombing raid targeting Constantinople. He was forced to turn back to base after an engine failed near Gallipoli. After flying on a single engine for more than 60 miles, that engine also failed and the aircraft ditched in the sea, near Suvla Bay. Alcock and his crew of two were unable to attract nearby British destroyers, and when the plane finally began to sink they swam for an hour to reach the Ottoman Army-held shore. All three were taken prisoner next day by the Turkish forces. Alcock remained a prisoner of war until the Armistice and retired from the Royal Air Force in March 1919.

== First non-stop flight across the Atlantic ==
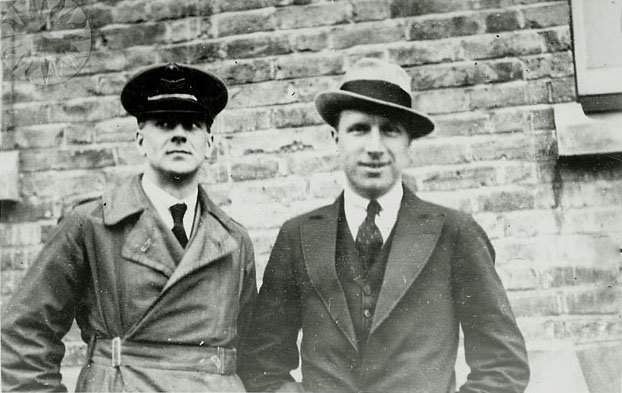
Alcock (right) with Arthur Brown in 1919

After the war Alcock became a test pilot for Vickers and took up the challenge of attempting to be the first to fly directly across the Atlantic. Alcock and Arthur Whitten Brown took off from St John's, Newfoundland, at 1:45 pm local time on 14 June 1919, and landed in Derrygimla bog near Clifden, Ireland, 16 hours and 12 minutes later on 15 June 1919 after flying 1,980 miles (3,190 km). The flight had been much affected by bad weather, making accurate navigation difficult; the intrepid duo also had to cope with turbulence, instrument failure, and ice on the wings. The flight was made in a modified Vickers Vimy bomber and won a £10,000 prize (£446,400 in 2025) offered by London's Daily Mail newspaper for the first non-stop flight across the Atlantic.

A few days after the flight both Alcock and Brown were honoured with a reception at Windsor Castle during which King George V invested them with their insignia as Knights Commanders of the Order of the British Empire.

Alcock was present at the Science Museum in London on 15 December 1919 when the recovered Vimy aircraft was presented to the nation.

== Death ==
On 18 December 1919, Alcock was piloting a new Vickers amphibious aircraft, the Vickers Viking, to the first post-war aeronautical exhibition in Paris when he crashed in fog at Cottévrard, near Rouen in Normandy. Alcock suffered a fractured skull and never regained consciousness after being transferred to a hospital in Rouen. He succumbed to his injuries the following day.

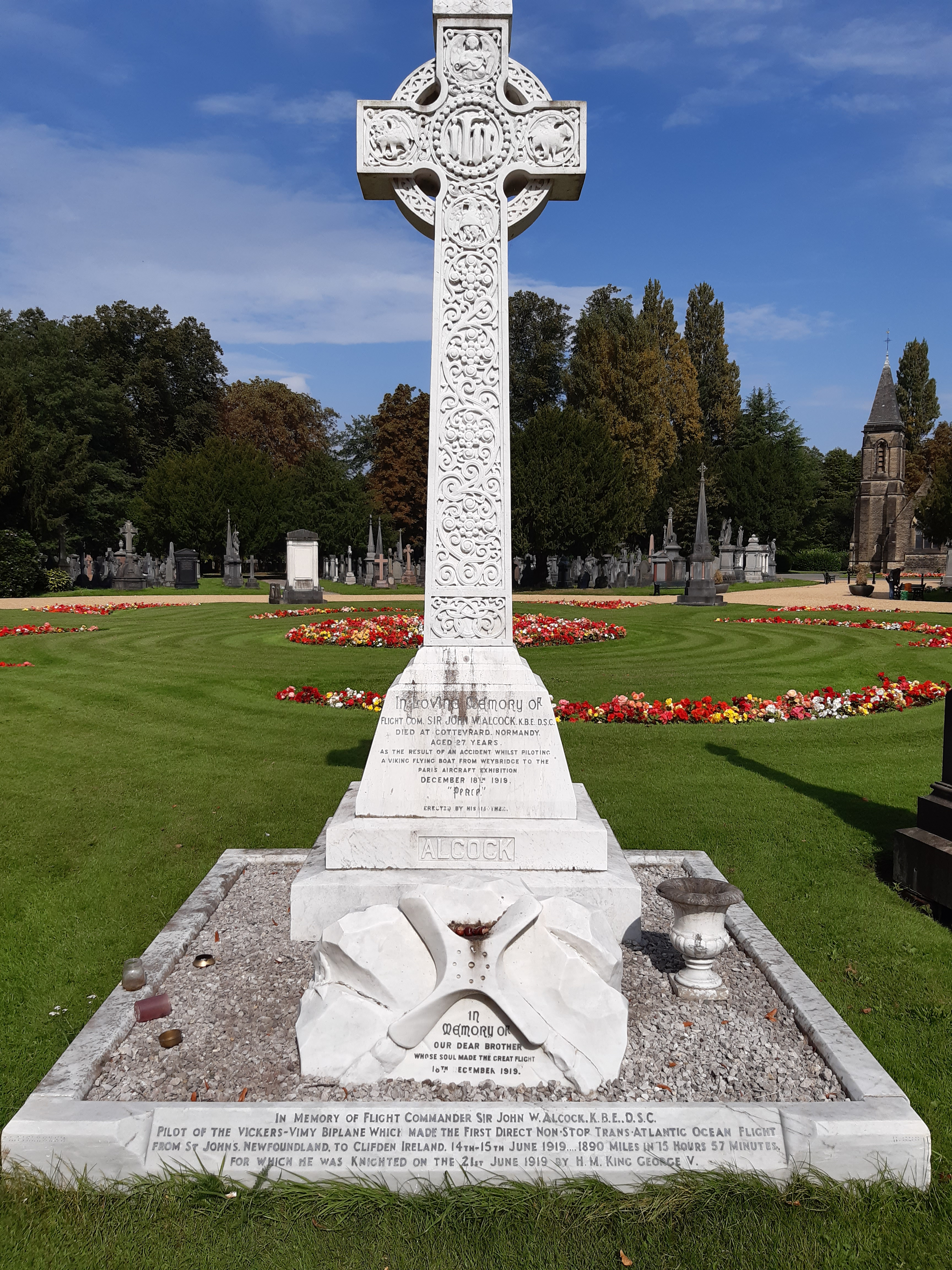
Gravestone of Alcock in Southern Cemetery, Manchester

His grave in Southern Cemetery, Manchester is marked by a large stone memorial.

== Awards and honours ==
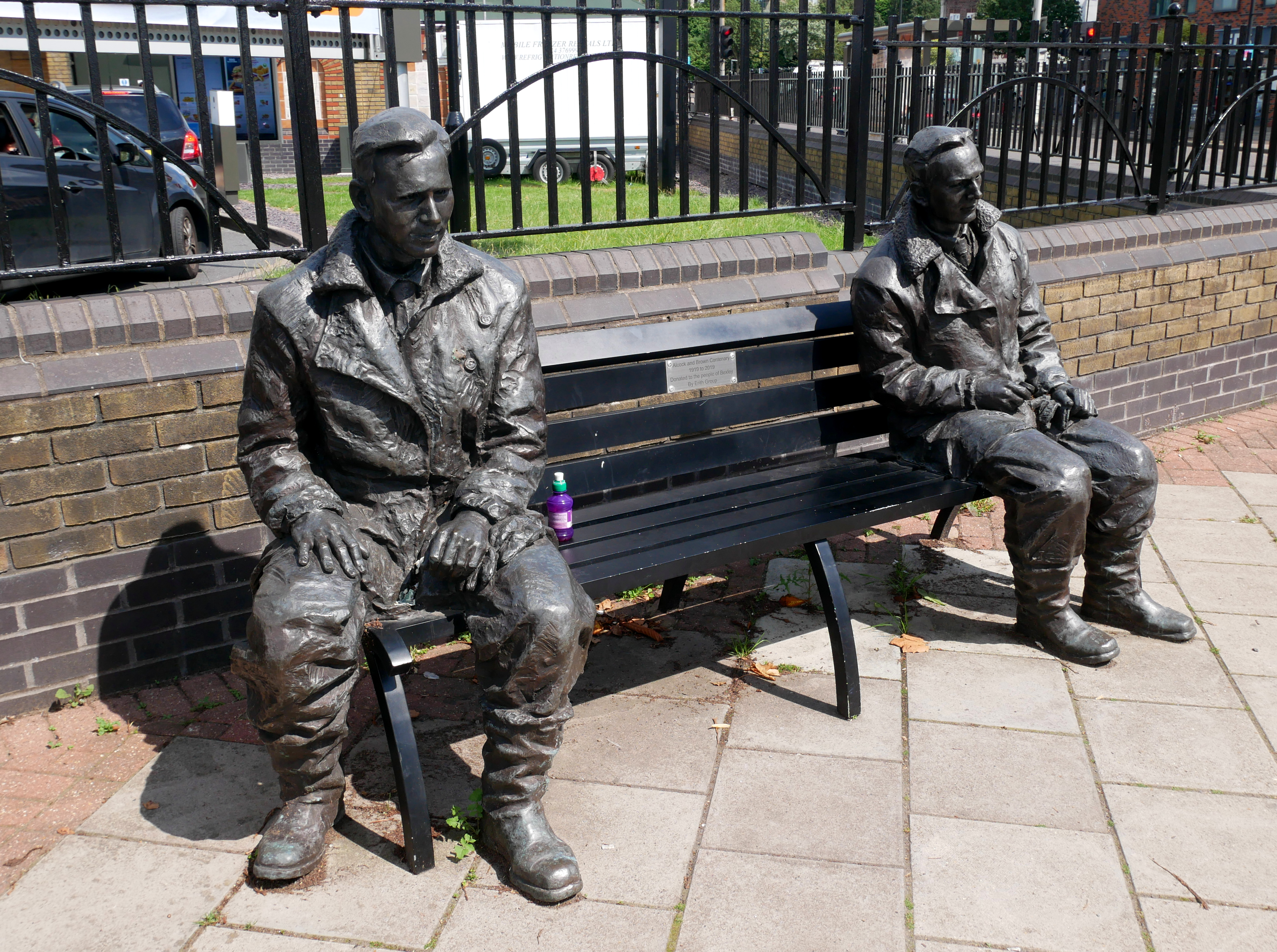
A sculpture of Alcock and Brown near the location of the (demolished) Vickers factory in Crayford, southeast London

- The Distinguished Service Cross announced on 19 December 1917.
  For the great skill, judgment and dash displayed by him off Moudros on the 30th September, 1917, in a successful attack on three enemy seaplanes, two of which were brought down in the sea.
- Knight Commander of the Civil Division of the Most Excellent Order of the British Empire announced on 27 June 1919.

"In recognition of distinguished services to Aviation, in connection with the successful flight from St. John's, Newfoundland, to Clifden, Co. Galway, on the 14th–15th June, 1919.

== See also ==
- Transatlantic flight
- John Cyril Porte - British flying boat pioneer whose transatlantic challenge was cancelled due to WWI
- Albert Cushing Read - Commander of the first transatlantic flight (1919)
- John Rodgers - commander of first flight to Hawaii (1925)
