= Cottévrard =

- Commune
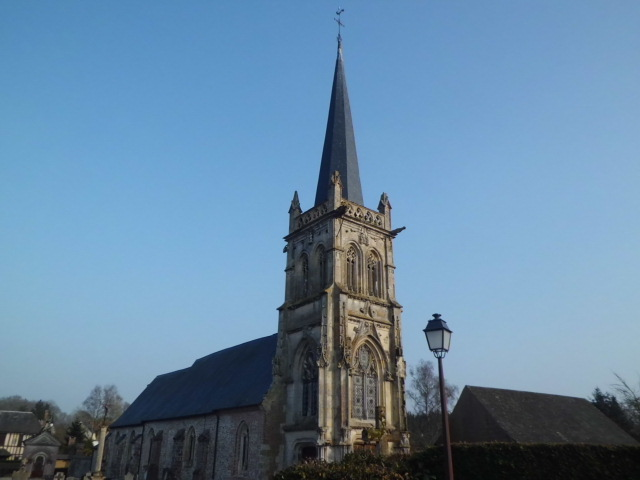
- The church in Cottévrard
- Location of Cottévrard
- Location within France Location within Normandy
- Coordinates: 49°38′01″N 1°13′23″E
- Country: France
- Region: Normandy
- Department: Seine-Maritime
- Arrondissement: Rouen
- Canton: Neufchâtel-en-Bray

Government
  - Mayor (2026–32): Fabrice Gamelin
- Area^{1}: 7.88 km^{2} (3.04 sq mi)
- Elevation: 166 m (545 ft)
- Highest elevation: 176 m (577 ft)
- Lowest elevation: 133 m (436 ft)
- Population (2023): 470
  - Density: 60/km^{2} (150/sq mi)
- Time zone: UTC+01:00 (CET)
  - Summer (DST): UTC+02:00 (CEST)
- INSEE/Postal code: 76188 /76850
- ^{1} French Land Register data, which excludes lakes, ponds, glaciers > 1 km^{2} (0.386 sq mi or 247 acres) and river estuaries.

Cottévrard (French pronunciation: [kɔtevʁaʁ]) is a commune in the Seine-Maritime department in the Normandy region in northern France.

== Geography ==
A farming village situated in the Pays de Caux, some 31 miles (50 km) south of Dieppe, at the junction of the D15, D19 and the D26 roads. The A29 autoroute passes through the north of the commune.

== Population ==
Historical population
Year	Pop.	±% p.a.
1968	219	—
1975	219	+0.00%
1982	291	+4.14%
1990	358	+2.62%
1999	339	−0.60%
2007	374	+1.24%
2012	427	+2.69%
2017	470	+1.94%
2023	470	+0.00%
Source: INSEE

== Places of interest ==
- The church of St.Nicolas, dating from the twelfth century.
- The Château de Grosmesnil.
- A sixteenth-century house.

== See also ==
- Communes of the Seine-Maritime department
- John Alcock, pilot of the first non-stop Atlantic flight in 1919; died following a crash at Cottévrard six months later
