= Arthur Whitten Brown =

Scottish pilot (1886–1948)

Sir Arthur Whitten Brown KBE
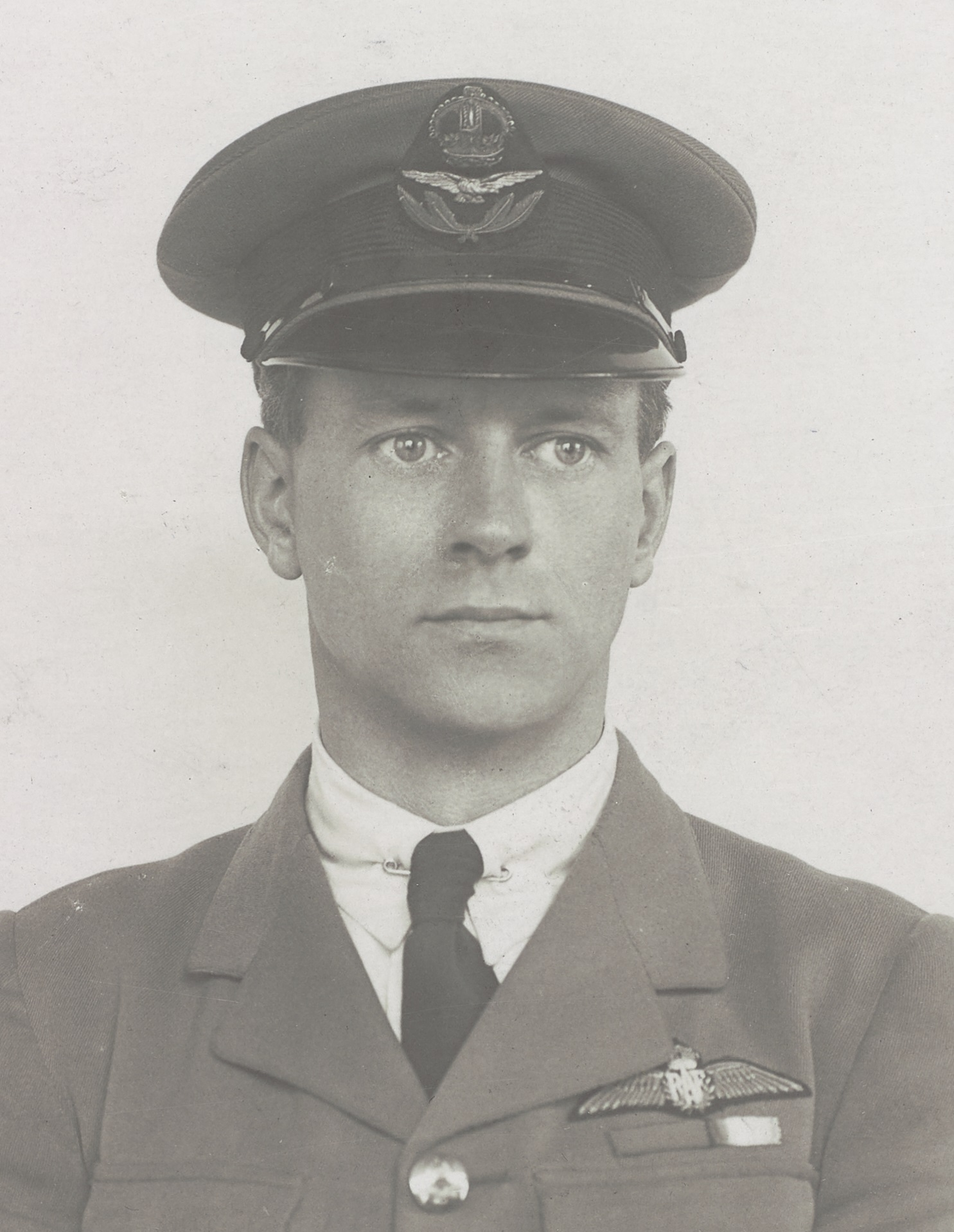
- Born: 23 July 1886; Glasgow, Scotland
- Died: 4 October 1948 (aged 62); Swansea, Wales
- Burial place: St Margaret Churchyard, Tylers Green, Buckinghamshire, England
- Military career
- Allegiance: United Kingdom
- Branch: British Army, Royal Air Force
- Service years: 1914–1919, 1939–1943
- Rank: Lieutenant-Colonel
- Units: University and Public Schools Brigade; Manchester Regiment; 2 Squadron Royal Flying Corps

Lieutenant-Colonel Sir Arthur Whitten Brown, KBE (23 July 1886 – 4 October 1948) was a British military officer and aviator who flew as navigator of the first successful non-stop transatlantic flight with pilot John Alcock in June 1919.

== Biography ==
Arthur Whitten Brown was born in Glasgow to American parents; his father had been sent to Scotland to evaluate the feasibility of siting a Westinghouse factory on Clydeside. His father, Arthur George, was an electrical engineer, After his birth, the family moved to Chorlton, and lived at 'Ellerslie', 6 Oswald Rd.

The factory was eventually sited in Trafford Park in Stretford, Manchester, and the family subsequently relocated there.

Both of the Atlantic pilots attended the Central High School for Boys, mostly known as Manchester Central High School. Alcock left at 16.

Brown began his career in engineering before the outbreak of World War I and undertook an apprenticeship with British Westinghouse in Manchester. In 1914, he enlisted in the ranks of the University and Public Schools Brigade (UPS) for which he had to take out British citizenship. The ranks of the UPS were full of potential officers and Brown was one of those who sought a commission to become a Second Lieutenant in the 3rd (Reserve) Battalion, Manchester Regiment. After service in France, Brown was seconded to 2 Squadron Royal Flying Corps as an observer.

Brown's aircraft was shot down by anti-aircraft fire over Vendin-le-Vieil in France while on artillery observation duties. He was sent back to England to recuperate but returned only to be shot down again, this time with a punctured fuel tank, near Bapaume in B.E.2c (number 2673) on a reconnaissance flight on 10 November 1915. Brown and his pilot, 2nd Lt. H. W. Medlicott, were captured by the Germans. (In June 1918 Medlicott was shot by the Germans while attempting to escape for the fourteenth time). Later interned in Switzerland, Brown was repatriated in September 1917.

After a period of leave he went to work with Major David Henry Kennedy RAF in the Ministry of Munitions. He met Kennedy's daughters, and married (Marguerite) Kathleen Kennedy, born in Gateshead on 6 April 1896, on 29 July 1919 at the Savoy Chapel. His wife died on 1 May 1952 in Swansea, and was buried at Tylers Green.

After the war Brown sought jobs that would give him the security to allow him to marry. One of the firms he approached was Vickers, a consequence of which was that he was asked if he would be the navigator for the proposed transatlantic flight, partnering John Alcock, who had been chosen as pilot.

== Transatlantic flight ==
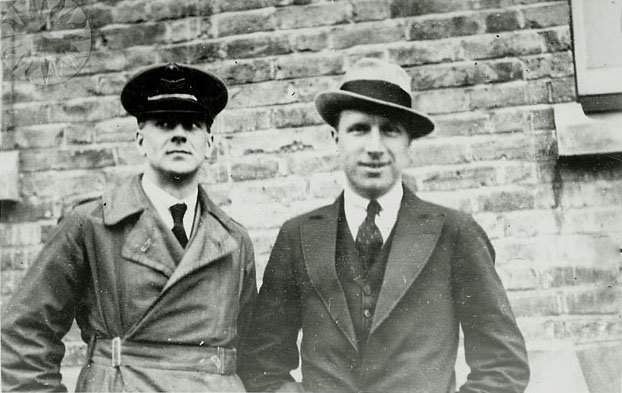
Brown (left) with John Alcock in 1919

The flight from St. John's, Newfoundland, to Clifden, Connemara, Ireland, took place on 14 June 1919. They departed St John's at 1.45 pm local time, and landed in Derrygimla bog 16 hours and 12 minutes later after flying 1,980 miles (3,168 km). The flight was made in a modified Vickers Vimy bomber, and won a £10,000 prize offered by London's Daily Mail newspaper for the first non-stop flight across the Atlantic. A few days after the flight both Brown and Alcock were honoured with a reception at Windsor Castle during which King George V invested them with their insignia as Knights Commanders of the Order of the British Empire.

== Post flight career ==
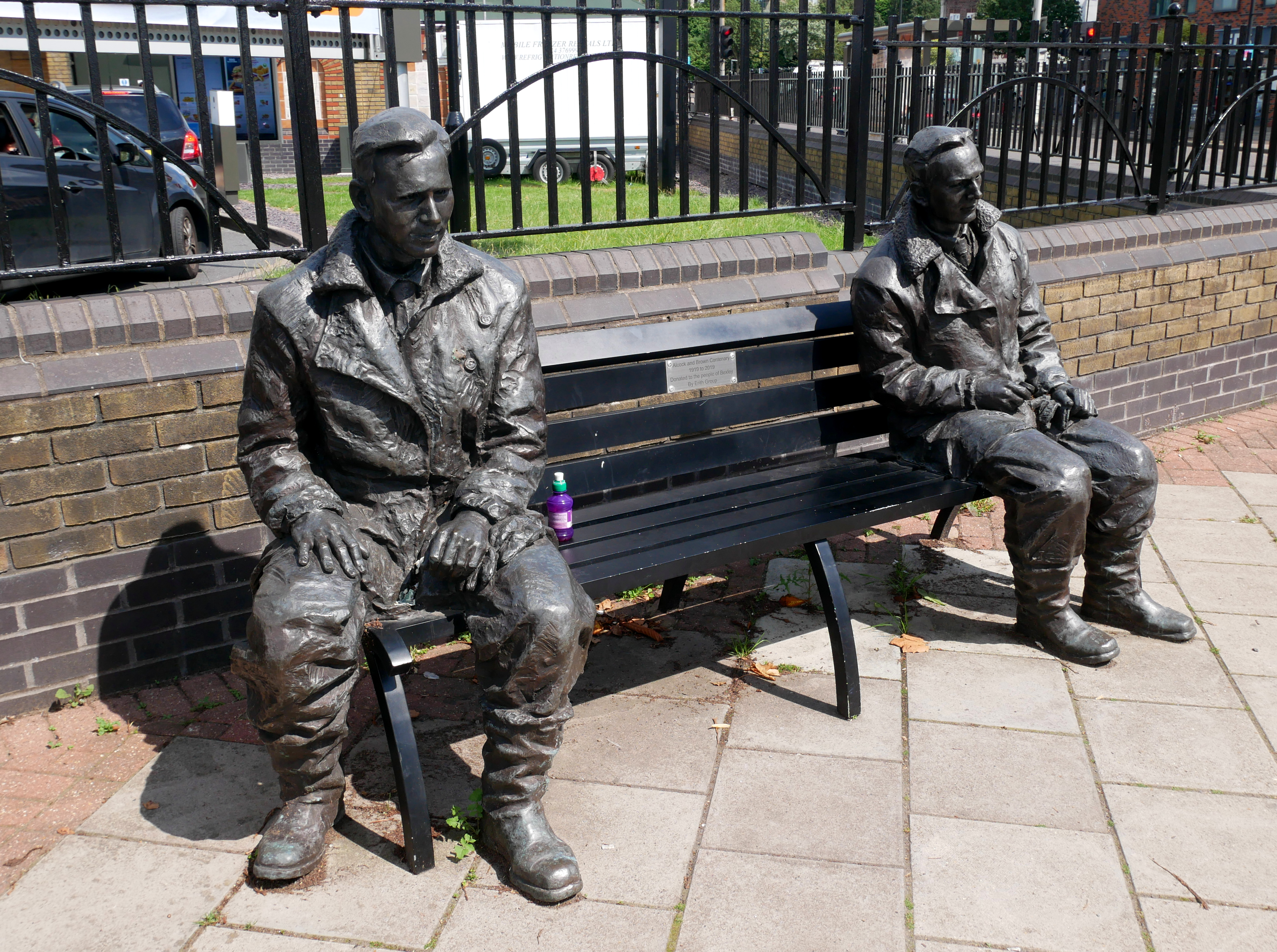
A sculpture of Alcock and Brown near the location of the (demolished) Vickers factory in Crayford, southeast London

Later he worked for Metropolitan-Vickers (MetroVick), the company that had once been British Westinghouse. In 1923 he was appointed chief representative for Metropolitan-Vickers in the Swansea area.

During World War II Brown served in the Home Guard as a Lieutenant-Colonel before resigning his commission in July 1941, rejoining the RAF and working in RAF Training Command as a pilot officer dealing with navigation. His health deteriorated and by mid-1943 he had to resign from the RAFVR and give up his Air Training Corps commitments on medical advice.

== Personal life ==
Brown's only son, Arthur (known as Buster), became an RAF Flight Lieutenant with 605 Squadron. He was killed on the night of 5/6 June 1944, aged 22, when his de Havilland Mosquito VI NT122 crashed in the Netherlands. Buster was buried at the general cemetery in Hoorn, the town closest to the crash. The death of his only son affected Brown badly.

In 2026 it was discovered that Buster was the father of a daughter, Arthur Whitten Brown's granddaughter.

== Death ==
By 1948 Brown's health had again deteriorated, although he was allowed to undertake restricted duties as general manager for Metropolitan-Vickers at the Wind Street offices.

Brown died in his sleep on 4 October 1948 from an accidental overdose of Veronal, a sleeping pill, aged 62.

Brown and his wife's ashes are interred at St Margaret Churchyard, Tylers Green, Buckinghamshire, England.

== Works ==
- Flying the Atlantic in Sixteen Hours, with a Discussion of Aircraft in Commerce and Transportation. Frederick A. Stokes. 1920. ISBN 9781409718871.; reprint READ BOOKS, 2008, ISBN 978-1-4097-1887-1
- Our Transatlantic Flight, Alcock and Brown, William Kimber, 1969, ISBN 978-0-7183-0221-4

== See also ==
- Transatlantic flight of Alcock and Brown
- Transatlantic flight
