= Alcock Scout =

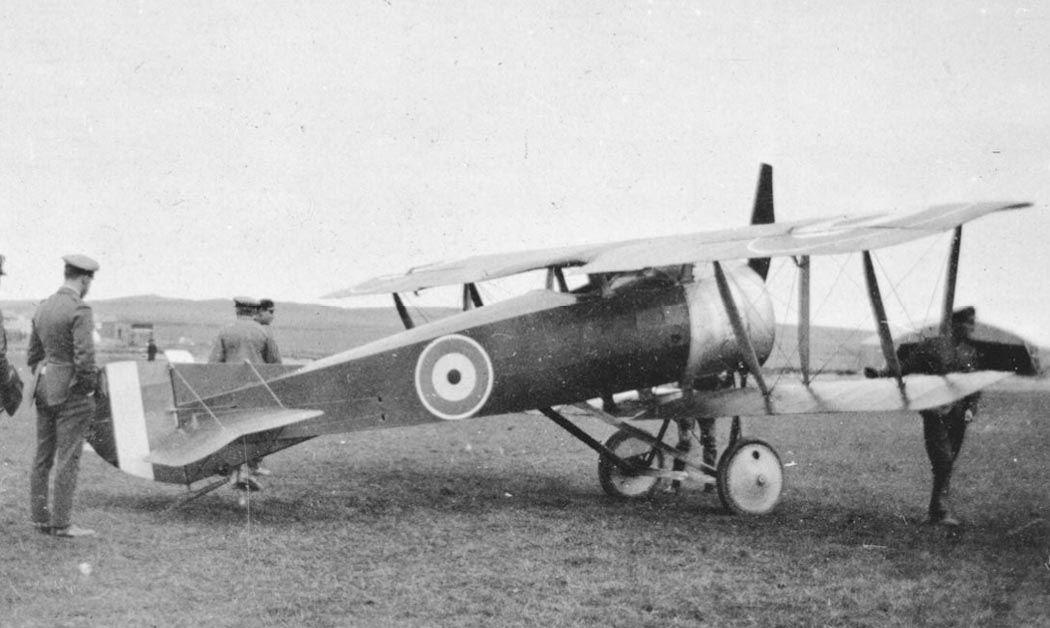
- Alcock Scout

General information
- Type: Fighter
- National origin: United Kingdom
- Designer: Flight Lieutenant John Alcock
- Number built: 1

History
- First flight: 15 October 1917
- Retired: 1918

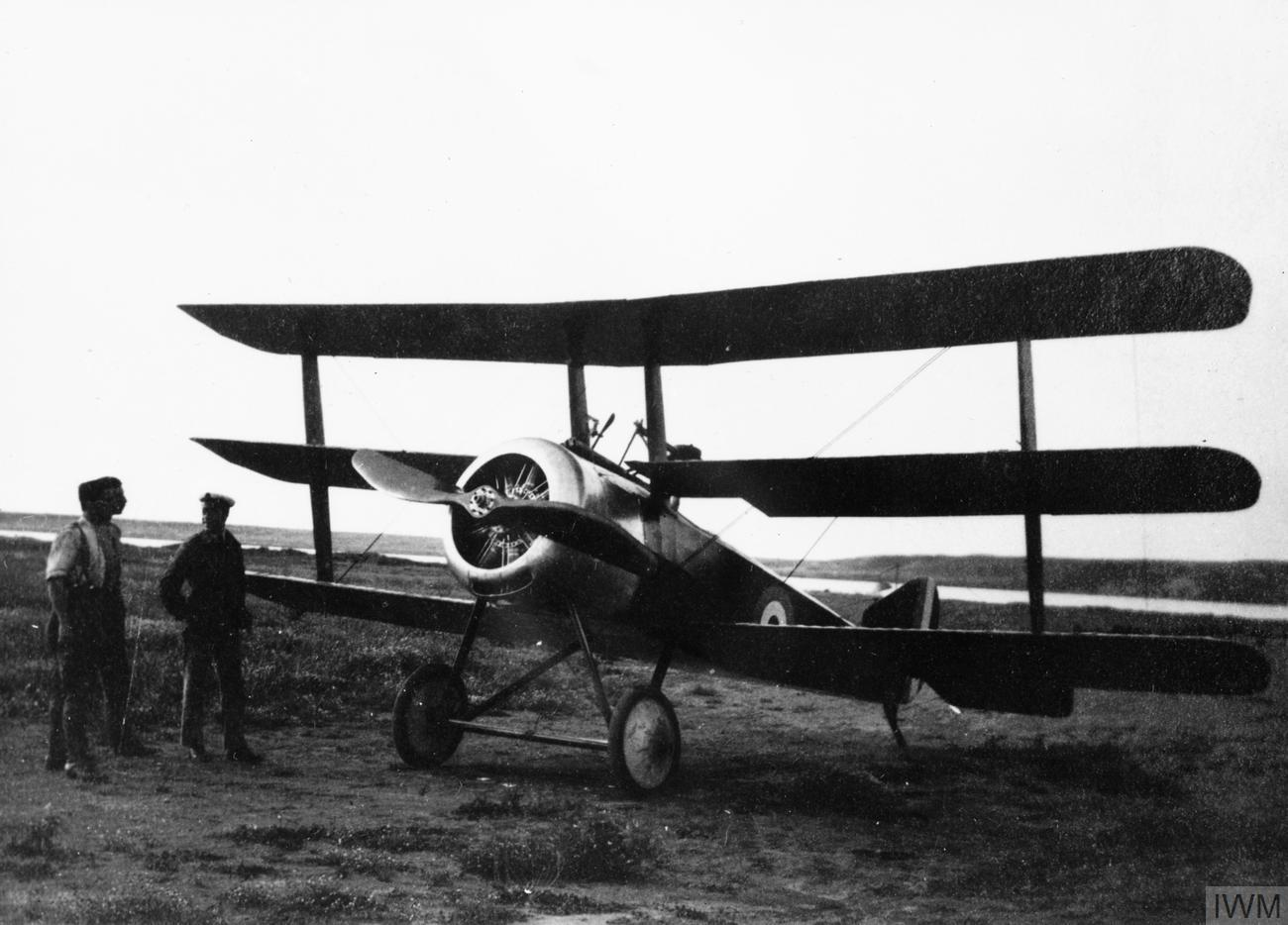
Sopwith Triplane of No. 2 (Naval) Wing at Mudros like the one used for parts.

The Alcock Scout, a.k.a. A.1 and Sopwith Mouse, was a curious "one-off" experimental fighter biplane flown briefly during World War I. It was assembled by Flight Lieutenant John Alcock at Moudros, a Royal Naval Air Service base in the Aegean Sea. Alcock took the forward fuselage and lower wings of a Sopwith Triplane, the upper wings of a Sopwith Pup and the tailplane and elevators of a Sopwith Camel, and married them to a rear fuselage and vertical tail surface of original design (presumably by Alcock himself). It was powered by a 110 hp Clerget 9Z engine, and carried a .303 Vickers machine gun.

Affectionally referred to as the 'Sopwith Mouse' by Alcock and his fellow designers, Alcock never flew it himself, but squadron-mate FSL Norman Starbuck made a few flights in it, the first on 15 October 1917. However, it crashed in early 1918, was written off and never flew again.

== Specifications (approximate) ==
Data from War Planes of the First World War: Volume One Fighters (Note: No weight or performance details are available.)

General characteristics

- Crew: 1
- Length: 19 ft 1 in (5.82 m)
- Wingspan: 24 ft 3 in (7.39 m)
- Height: 7 ft 9 in (2.36 m)
- Powerplant: 1 × Clerget 9Z nine-cylinder rotary engine , 110 hp (84 kW)

Armament

- 1 x .303 Vickers machine gun
