= Connacht Tribune =

Irish regional newspaper

Connacht Tribune - Galway City Tribune

- Type: Weekly newspaper
- Format: Original broadsheet but tabloid since 2014.
- Founder: Tom 'Cork' Kenny
- Language: English
- Headquarters: Liosban Business Park, Tuam Road, Galway
- City: Galway
- Country: Ireland
- Website: connachttribune.ie

The Connacht Tribune (Irish: An Curadh Connachtach) is a newspaper circulating chiefly in County Galway, Ireland.

Published as a regional newspaper for County Galway, the Tribune Group prints two titles every week - the Connacht Tribune on Thursday and the Galway City Tribune on Friday. Connacht Tribune Group newspapers are circulated in every district of the city and every town and village in the county. As of January 2007, its weekly readership was over 150,000.

== History ==
In 1925, the Connacht Tribune stable began publishing the Connacht Sentinel, which was joined in 1984 by the Galway City Tribune. The Connacht Sentinel ceased publication in 2014. Since then, the Connacht Tribune has focused mainly on news relating to County Galway. In addition to a number of staff journalists, the paper also employs a number of reporters around the county for specific regional coverage.

John Cunningham was editor from 1984 to 2007.

Until January 1995, the newspaper's logo was in black. This changed to red on Thursday 2 February 1995. One issue, on Thursday 16 March 1995, had a green logo to mark the eve of St Patrick's Day.

As of 2004, former hurler John McIntyre was sports editor of the Connacht Tribune.

In 2006, the newspaper purchased Galway's local radio station, Galway Bay FM.

The last broadsheet-size Galway City Tribune was published on Friday 11 October 2013 and, on 18 October 2013, it moved to tabloid. On Thursday 27 March 2014, the last big Connacht Tribune hit the shops - reduced to tabloid on Thursday 3 April 2014. In 2014, the final edition of the Connacht Sentinel was published.

The Tribune's archives are available online to view any issue of the Connacht Tribune since its inception in 1909.
