= List of The New York Times number-one books of 1939 =

This is a list of books that topped The New York Times best-seller list in 1939. When the list began in 1931 through 1941 it only reflected sales in the New York City area.

== Fiction ==
The following list ranks the number-one best-selling fiction books.

The two most popular books that year were The Grapes of Wrath, by John Steinbeck, which held on top of the list for 24 weeks, and All This and Heaven Too by Rachel Field, which was on top of the list for 14 weeks.

Date	Book	Author
January 2	All This and Heaven Too	Rachel Field
January 9	Rebecca	Daphne du Maurier
January 16	All This and Heaven Too	Rachel Field
January 23	All This and Heaven Too	Rachel Field
January 30	All This and Heaven Too	Rachel Field
February 6	All This and Heaven Too	Rachel Field
February 13	All This and Heaven Too	Rachel Field
February 20	All This and Heaven Too	Rachel Field
February 27	All This and Heaven Too	Rachel Field
March 6	All This and Heaven Too	Rachel Field
March 13	All This and Heaven Too	Rachel Field
March 20	All This and Heaven Too	Rachel Field
March 27	All This and Heaven Too	Rachel Field
April 3	Wickford Point	John P. Marquand
April 10	All This and Heaven Too	Rachel Field
April 17	All This and Heaven Too	Rachel Field
April 24	Wickford Point	John P. Marquand
May 1	The Grapes of Wrath	John Steinbeck
May 8	The Grapes of Wrath	John Steinbeck
May 15	The Grapes of Wrath	John Steinbeck
May 22	The Grapes of Wrath	John Steinbeck
May 29	The Grapes of Wrath	John Steinbeck
June 5	The Grapes of Wrath	John Steinbeck
June 12	The Grapes of Wrath	John Steinbeck
June 19	The Grapes of Wrath	John Steinbeck
June 26	The Grapes of Wrath	John Steinbeck
July 3	The Grapes of Wrath	John Steinbeck
July 10	The Grapes of Wrath	John Steinbeck
July 17	The Grapes of Wrath	John Steinbeck
July 24	The Grapes of Wrath	John Steinbeck
July 31	The Grapes of Wrath	John Steinbeck
August 7	The Grapes of Wrath	John Steinbeck
August 14	The Grapes of Wrath	John Steinbeck
August 21	The Grapes of Wrath	John Steinbeck
August 28	The Grapes of Wrath	John Steinbeck
September 4	The Grapes of Wrath	John Steinbeck
September 11	The Grapes of Wrath	John Steinbeck
September 18	The Grapes of Wrath	John Steinbeck
September 25	The Grapes of Wrath	John Steinbeck
October 2	The Grapes of Wrath	John Steinbeck
October 9	Escape	Ethel Vance
October 16	The Grapes of Wrath	John Steinbeck
October 23	Escape	Ethel Vance
October 30	Escape	Ethel Vance
November 6	Escape	Ethel Vance
November 13	Escape	Ethel Vance
November 20	Kitty Foyle	Christopher Morley
November 27	Kitty Foyle	Christopher Morley
December 4	Kitty Foyle	Christopher Morley
December 11	Kitty Foyle	Christopher Morley
December 18	The Nazarene	Sholem Asch
December 25	Moment in Peking	Lin Yutang

== Nonfiction ==
The following list ranks the number-one best-selling nonfiction books.

Date	Book	Author
January 2	Listen! The Wind	Anne Morrow Lindbergh
January 9	Listen! The Wind	Anne Morrow Lindbergh
January 16	Listen! The Wind	Anne Morrow Lindbergh
January 23	With Malice Toward Some	Margaret Halsey
January 30	Listen! The Wind	Anne Morrow Lindbergh
February 6	We Saw It Happen	Hanson W. Baldwin and Shepard Stone, editors
February 13	A Peculiar Treasure	Edna Ferber
February 20	A Peculiar Treasure	Edna Ferber
February 27	A Peculiar Treasure	Edna Ferber
March 6	A Peculiar Treasure	Edna Ferber
March 13	A Peculiar Treasure	Edna Ferber
March 20	Reaching for the Stars	Nora Waln
March 27	Reaching for the Stars	Nora Waln
April 3	Reaching for the Stars	Nora Waln
April 10	Reaching for the Stars	Nora Waln
April 17	Reaching for the Stars	Nora Waln
April 24	Reaching for the Stars	Nora Waln
May 1	Days of Our Years	Pierre van Paassen
May 8	Reaching for the Stars	Nora Waln
May 15	Reaching for the Stars	Nora Waln
May 22	Reaching for the Stars	Nora Waln
May 29	Reaching for the Stars	Nora Waln
June 5	Days of Our Years	Pierre van Paassen
June 12	Days of Our Years	Pierre van Paassen
June 19	Inside Asia	John Gunther
June 26	Inside Asia	John Gunther
July 3	Inside Asia	John Gunther
July 10	Inside Asia	John Gunther
July 17	Inside Asia	John Gunther
July 24	Inside Asia	John Gunther
July 31	Inside Asia	John Gunther
August 7	Inside Asia	John Gunther
August 14	Not Peace but a Sword	Vincent Sheean
August 21	Not Peace but a Sword	Vincent Sheean
August 28	Not Peace but a Sword	Vincent Sheean
September 4	Country Lawyer	Bellamy Partridge
September 11	Not Peace but a Sword	Vincent Sheean
September 18	Inside Asia	John Gunther
September 25	Country Lawyer	Bellamy Partridge
October 2	Country Lawyer	Bellamy Partridge
October 9	Inside Asia	John Gunther
October 16	Inside Asia	John Gunther
October 23	Country Lawyer	Bellamy Partridge
October 30	A Treasury of Art Masterpieces	Thomas Craven, editor
November 6	Country Lawyer	Bellamy Partridge
November 13	Country Lawyer	Bellamy Partridge
November 20	Country Lawyer	Bellamy Partridge
November 27	Country Lawyer	Bellamy Partridge
December 4	Country Lawyer	Bellamy Partridge
December 11	Country Lawyer	Bellamy Partridge
December 18	Country Lawyer	Bellamy Partridge
December 25	A Treasury of Art Masterpieces	Thomas Craven, editor

== See also ==
- Publishers Weekly list of bestselling novels in the United States in the 1930s
