= List of Chapin School people =

Chapin School is an all-girls independent day school located on Manhattan's Upper East Side in New York City.

The following is a list of its notable alumni.

- Mary Abbott, 1939, painter, member of New York School of Abstract Expressionists
- Theodora Mead Abel, 1917, psychology professor, author, Culture and Psychotherapy
- Amy Bach, 1986, lawyer, civil rights journalist, author, Ordinary Injustice: How America Holds Court
- Elizabeth Bailey, 1956, economist; John C. Hower Professor, Wharton School; member, American Academy of Arts and Sciences
- Lake Bell, 1998, model; actress, Boston Legal, Million Dollar Arm, The Secret Life of Pets; filmmaker, In a World....
- Barbara Bennett, 1924, stage and film actress, dancer, literary representative
- Constance Bennett, 1922, stage, radio, television and film actress; star of What Price Hollywood?, Topper, and Two-Faced Woman
- Joan Bennett, 1928, stage, film, and television actress; star of Man Hunt, The Woman in the Window, and Dark Shadows
- Tonya Bolden, 1976, author of children's non-fiction such as Pathfinders: The Journeys of 16 Extraordinary Black Souls
- Patricia Bosworth, 1951, journalist; biographer; actress; model; managing editor, Harper's Bazaar
- Jacqueline Bouvier, 1947, First Lady of the United States, editor
- Elizabeth Mills Brown, 1934, architectural historian; author, New Haven: A Guide to Architecture and Urban Design
- Sunny von Bülow, 1950, socialite, legal catalyst
- Doris Caesar, 1910, Expressionist sculptor
- Stockard Channing, 1962, actress in stage, film, and television
- Frances Sergeant Childs, 1919, historian; founding faculty member, Brooklyn College; author, French Refugee Life in the United States, 1790–1800: An American Chapter of the French Revolution (1940)
- Hope Cooke, 1958, queen of Sikkim, journalist, urban historian, lecturer
- Tricia Nixon Cox, 1964, board member for medical and Republican causes
- Cusi Cram, 1985, model; actor, One Life to Live; writer, Arthur, The Big C, The Octonauts
- Caresse Crosby, 1909, "literary godmother" to the Lost Generation in Paris; co-founder, Black Sun Press; inventor of the bra
- Lindsay Crouse, 1967, actress of stage, film, and television
- Fernanda Eberstadt, 1978, novelist, essayist, critic; author, Isaac and His Devils, Rat, and The Furies
- Julie Nixon Eisenhower, 1966, editor; author, Pat Nixon: the Untold Story
- Brenda Frazier, 1939, socialite, known as a "Poor Little Rich Girl"
- Alix M. Freedman, 1975, Pulitzer Prize-winning journalist; ethics editor, Thomson Reuters
- Kiran Gandhi, 2007, musician and activist
- Virginia Gilder, 1976, entrepreneur, writer, co-owner of WNBA's Seattle Storm, Olympic silver medalist in rowing, author of Course Correction: A Story of Rowing and Resilience in the Wake of Title IX
- Neva Goodwin Rockefeller, 1962, economist, series editor of Evolving Values for a Capitalist World, philanthropist
- Isabella Greenway, 1904, rancher, businesswoman, politician, first Arizona congresswoman
- Eileen Rockefeller Growald, 1970, venture philanthropist
- Anna Roosevelt Halsted, 1924, journalist, editor, administrator
- Deborah Hautzig, 1974 writer, author of Hey, Dollface and the Little Witch series for children
- Amanda Hearst, 2002, fashion model, socialite, activist, editor of Marie Claire
- Frances Hellman, 1974, physicist, dean of Division of Mathematics and Physical Sciences, University of California, Berkeley
- Malvina Hoffman, 1903, sculptor, author, Heads and Tales
- Helen Hooker, 1923, sculptor, painter, national tennis champion, philanthropist
- Alexandra Isles, 1963, documentary filmmaker, Porraimos: Europe's Gypsies in the Holocaust; actress, Dark Shadows
- Theodora Keogh, 1937, dancer, novelist, adventurer, author, Meg: The Secret Life of an Awakening Girl
- Alexandra Kotur, 1988, journalist; style director, Vogue; creative director, Town and Country
- Nicola Kraus, 1992, writer, co-author, The Nanny Diaries
- Aerin Lauder, 1988, businesswoman, creative director of Estée Lauder; co-author, Beauty at Home
- Jane Lauder, 1991, businesswoman; global director, Estée Lauder
- Anne Morrow Lindbergh, 1924, writer, aviator, author, Gift from the Sea and North to the Orient
- Ruth du Pont Lord, 1939, psychotherapist, arts patron, author, Henry F. du Pont and Winterthur: A Daughter's Portrait
- Sarah Lyall, 1981, journalist, The New York Times; author, The Anglo Files: A Field Guide to the British
- Emma Fordyce MacRae, 1905, representational painter; member of the Philadelphia Ten
- Abby Rockefeller Mauzé, 1921, philanthropist
- Neylan McBaine, 1995, writer; author of How to Be a Twenty-First Century Pioneer Woman; editor of Mormon Women Project
- Cynthia McClintock, 1963, professor, George Washington University; author, Revolutionary Movements in Latin America
- Lynden B. Miller, 1956, public garden designer and author
- Maud Morgan, 1921, abstract expressionist painter
- Andrea Blaugrund Nevins, 1980, journalist, documentary filmmaker, The Other F Word
- Sheila Nickerson, 1960, writer; Poet laureate of Alaska; author, Disappearance: A Map and The Song of the Soapstone Carver
- Galt Niederhoffer, 1994, producer, director, novelist, screenwriter, Prozac Nation, The Romantics
- Queen Noor of Jordan (Lisa Halaby), 1969, activist, writer, president, United World Colleges
- Jennifer "DJ" (Berinstein) Nordquist, 1985, government, international organization, and think tank executive
- Maud Oakes, 1922, ethnologist, artist, writer, author, The Two Crosses of Todos Santos: Survivals of Mayan Religious Ritual
- Sister Parish (Dorothy May Kinnicutt), 1928, interior designer
- Betty Parsons, 1918, abstract painter, art collector, art dealer
- Cosima von Bülow Pavoncelli, 1985, socialite, philanthropist
- Joan Whitney Payson, 1921, art collector; co-owner, Greentree Stable; owner, the New York Mets; philanthropist
- Georgia Pellegrini, 1998, hunter, chef, writer
- Adela Peña, 1981, violinist, founding member of the internationally known Naumburg Award-winning Eroica Trio
- Rosamond Pinchot, 1922, actress, "loveliest woman in America"
- Lilly Pulitzer, 1949, fashion designer
- Lee Radziwill, 1951, socialite and interior designer
- Blanchette Ferry Rockefeller, 1927, philanthropist, president, Museum of Modern Art
- Eileen Rockefeller, 1970, philanthropist
- Samantha Ronson, 1995, singer-songwriter, DJ
- Margot Roosevelt, 1968, journalist
- Laura Rothenberg, 1999, writer
- Edith Finch Russell, 1918, biographer, author, Carey Thomas of Bryn Mawr
- Rachel Rutherford, 1994, dancer, soloist, New York City Ballet
- Lilian Swann Saarinen, 1930, sculptor, illustrator, Olympic skier
- Najla Said, 1992, writer, actor, playwright, author, Looking for Palestine: Growing Up Confused in an Arab-American Family
- Lydia Sargent, 1959, feminist activist; co-founder, South End Press and Z Magazine; author, I Read About My Death in Vogue Magazine
- Louise Serpa, 1943, rodeo photographer
- Delia Sherman, 1968, fantasy writer, editor, author, The Porcelain Dove and The Freedom Maze
- Gladys Vanderbilt Széchenyi, 1904, heiress
- Ivanka Trump, 2000, businesswoman, executive vice president, the Trump Organization
- Nancy Tuckerman, 1947, social secretary for Jackie Bouvier Kennedy, 1963–1994; co-author, revised edition of Amy Vanderbilt's Complete Book of Etiquette
- Anne Walker, 1991, architectural historian, co-author, The Architecture of Delano & Aldrich and The Finest Rooms in America
- Challis Walker, 1930, sculptor, painter
- Vera Wang, 1967, former senior editor, Vogue; fashion designer
- Sigourney Weaver, 1968, actress, producer
- Aileen Osborn Webb, 1910, philanthropist, founder, American Craft Council
- Betty Wei, 1949, historian, author, Old Shanghai and Liu Chi-Wen: biography of a revolutionary leader
- Christine Todd Whitman, 1964, politician, lobbyist, former governor of New Jersey
- Dorothy Payne Whitney, 1904, social activist, co-founder, The New Republic and the New School for Social Research
- Helen Whitney, 1961, documentary filmmaker, First Edition, Faith and Doubt at Ground Zero, and The Mormons
- Lauren Willig, 1995, historical novelist, author, Pink Carnation series and The Forgotten Room
- Jane Wyatt, 1928, actress, Father Knows Best
