= Erik Lindbergh =

American aviator (born 1965)

- Lindbergh in New York City, September 2002
- Born: Erik Robbins Lindbergh; 1965 (age 60–61)
- Occupations: Aviator, artist, public speaker
- Parent(s): Jon Lindbergh; Barbara Robbins
- Website: www.eriklindbergh.com

Erik Robbins Lindbergh (born 1965) is an American aviator, adventurer, and artist. He is the grandson of pioneering aviator Charles Lindbergh, the first person to fly non-stop and solo between New York and Paris in 1927. In 2002, Erik Lindbergh honored the 75th anniversary of his grandfather's historic flight by retracing the journey in a single-engine Lancair aircraft. The journey was documented by the History Channel, raised over one million dollars for three charities, garnered half a billion media impressions for the X PRIZE Foundation and helped to jump-start the private Spaceflight industry. The flight prompted a call from United States President George W. Bush for inspiring the country after the tragedy of the September 11 attacks.

== Career ==
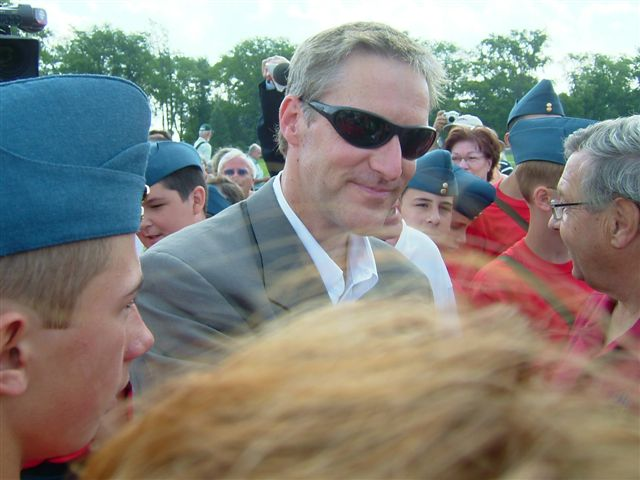
Erik Lindbergh in Quebec City, 2008

Erik has a degree in Aeronautical Science from Emery Aviation College and is a commercial rated pilot and flight instructor. He owns the Lindbergh Gallery, and is the founder and CEO of Powering Imagination. He also serves on the board of directors of Aviation High School in Seattle, Washington. He lives in a yurt which he built in the Pacific Northwest.

He serves on the board of the X PRIZE Foundation, which administered the Ansari X Prize for the first non-governmental reusable crewed spacecraft, in addition to serving on the NatureBridge Olympic Board of Directors. The X Prize is seen as a major boost for the cause of space tourism, and of private spaceflight in general. It is fashioned after the Orteig Prize, the aviation incentive prize won by Charles Lindbergh's transatlantic flight in 1927.

=== Anniversary flight ===
In May 2002, Erik Lindbergh honored the 75th anniversary of his grandfather's historic flight by re-tracing the flight across the Atlantic in a small single engine aircraft, a Lancair Columbia 300 dubbed The New Spirit of St. Louis which cost US$289,000. Leaving from San Diego, he flew to St Louis, then Farmingdale, New York, and then the most famous portion, the non-stop flight from Republic Airport on Long Island to Le Bourget Airport in Paris on May 2, 2002.

The last portion of the flight was completed in 17 hours and 7 minutes, roughly half the time as the original (33 1/2 hours), but still a challenge as Lindbergh suffers from disabling rheumatoid arthritis and has two artificial knees. The "Mission Control" for the flight was located at the Saint Louis Science Center in St. Louis, Missouri, which as of 2011 maintains multiple exhibits about the flight.

Lindbergh participated in the Flight Across America project, speaking during the opening ceremonies at Paine Field, Everett, Washington on August 11, 2002 and then participating in the closing ceremonies in New York City on the deck of the USS Intrepid on September 8, 2002.

=== Verdego Aero ===
In December 2017, Lindbergh formed VerdeGo Aero with Embry-Riddle Aeronautical University's Pat Anderson, and Eric Bartsch. VerdeGo develops electric propulsion systems for aircraft.

As over 100 companies try to build eVTOL, Lindbergh wants to supply its electric distributed propulsion from 2023: the 200–325 hp (150–240 kW) IDEP-H2 powered by one or two piston engines for 2-3-seat aircraft and the 500–800 shp (370–600 kW) IDEP-H7 based on a gas turbine for 5-7-seaters. Its competitors would include Safran, Siemens, Yates Electrospace, motorist MagniX or Swiss H55 formed by Solar Impulse co-founder André Borschberg. Helicopter-style Articulated rotors provide more control for larger aircraft than multicopter drones' fixed-pitch propellers, avoiding control lag.

== Personal life ==
Son of Jon Lindbergh and Barbara Robbins, Erik Lindbergh is the grandson, by his father, of the pioneering aviators Charles Lindbergh and Anne Morrow Lindbergh. His father's Lindbergh siblings are Land Morrow Lindbergh (1937–), writer Anne Spencer Lindbergh (1940–1993), conservationist Scott Lindbergh (1942–), and writer Reeve Lindbergh (1945–).

== Writing ==
Lindbergh has written the foreword to several books, a monthly column in AOPA Pilot magazine and numerous freelance and op-ed articles.

== Awards, honors, distinctions ==
In May 2008 Lindbergh was awarded an honorary doctorate of laws degree from Molloy College in NY for outstanding service to humanity.
