= Noel Perrin =

American writer (1927–2004)

- Born: Edwin Noel Perrin; September 18, 1927; New York City, U.S.
- Died: November 21, 2004 (aged 77); Thetford, Vermont, U.S.
- Education: Williams College (BA); Duke University (MA); University of Cambridge (MLitt)
- Occupations: Writer; academic
- Spouses: Nancy Hunnicutt (m. 1960; div. 1971) Annemarie Price (m. 1975; div. 1980) Anne Lindbergh (m. 1988; died 1993): Sara Coburn
- Children: 2
- Writing career
- Genre: Essay
- Subject: Rural life

Edwin Noel Perrin (September 18, 1927 – November 21, 2004) was an American essayist and a professor at Dartmouth College. He was known for writing about rural life.

== Early life and education ==
Perrin was born on September 18, 1927, in Manhattan and grew up in Pelham Manor, New York. His parents both worked as advertising copywriters at the J. Walter Thompson Agency. His mother Blanche was a career writer and the author of several novels, and she was his inspiration to become a writer.

Perrin was educated at the Woodberry Forest School in Orange, Virginia, and later at Williams College where he majored in English Literature and graduated in 1949. He received a master's degree from Duke University in 1950, then served in the Army. During the Korean War, he served as a forward observer in a field artillery unit and was awarded the Bronze Star.

== Teaching and writing career ==
Perrin taught English literature at the Woman's College of the University of North Carolina from 1956 to 1959. He further studied at Cambridge University, where he received a M.Litt. degree in 1958. He joined the Dartmouth faculty in 1959 as an instructor in English, reaching the rank of full professor by 1970. He specialized in teaching modern poetry, particularly that of Robert Frost. He was a Fulbright professor at Warsaw University in Poland in 1970, and was twice a Guggenheim Fellow. He joined Dartmouth's Environmental Studies Program in 1984 as an adjunct professor, teaching courses on a range of subjects.

Perrin wrote essays for many publications and was a regular contributor to the Washington Post for more than 20 years, covering a wide variety of subjects. His Washington Post essays later were published as A Reader's Delight (1988), one of his 12 books. His later Washington Post columns about forgotten works of children's literature were collected in A Child's Delight (1997). His second book was Dr. Bowdler's Legacy: A History of Expurgated Books in England and America (1969) and was nominated for the National Book Award. His sixth book was Giving up the Gun: Japan's Reversion to the Sword, 1543–1879.

In 1963, Perrin bought a farm in Thetford Center, Vermont which served him as home and grist for six books, including First Person Rural: Essays of a Sometime Farmer (1978). He often wrote essays about rural life in a fashion similar to the poems of Will Carleton. "He reveled in the rural life," said writer Reeve Lindbergh, who was Perrin's third wife's sister. Perrin's third wife was Anne Lindbergh, elder daughter of Charles Lindbergh and Anne Morrow Lindbergh.

Perrin once wrote to a friend: "I currently spend half my time teaching at Dartmouth, half farming and half writing. That this adds up to three halves I am all too aware."

== Personal life ==
=== Family ===
Perrin was married four times: to Nancy Hunnicut, from 1960 until their divorce in 1971; to Annemarie Price, from 1975 until their divorce in 1980; to Lindbergh, from 1988 until her death in 1993; and Sara Coburn, until his death. He had two daughters from his first marriage.

=== Environmentalism ===
Perrin's interest in environmental matters, including alternative energy sources, led him to purchase an electric car in 1990. He recounted his adventures driving his converted Ford Escort from Solar Electric Engineering in California to his Vermont home in Solo: Life with an Electric Car (1992). One advantage of the car proved to be a rare reserved parking spot on campus—with its own electrical outlet.

=== Death ===
Perrin, who had Shy–Drager syndrome, died at his farmhouse on November 21, 2004, aged 77. Prior to that, he lived in a nursing home for 6 months, but came back home to his farmhouse shortly before his death.

== His works ==
- A Passport Secretly Green (1961)
- Dr. Bowdler's Legacy: A History of Expurgated Books in England and America (1969)
- Vermont in All Weathers (1971)
- Amateur Sugar Maker (1972)
- First Person Rural: Essays of a Sometime Farmer (1978)
- Giving up the Gun: Japan's Reversion to the Sword, 1543–1879 (1979)
- Second Person Rural: More Essays of a Sometime Farmer (1980)
- Third Person Rural: Further Essays of a Sometime Farmer (1983)
- Forever Virgin: The American View of America (1986, in Antaeus)
- A Reader's Delight (1988)
- Last Person Rural (1991)
- Solo: Life with an Electric Car (1992)
- A Child's Delight (1997)
- Best Person Rural: Essays of a Sometime Farmer (2006), edited by Terry S. Osborne
