= John Ciardi =

American poet, professor, translator (1916–1986)

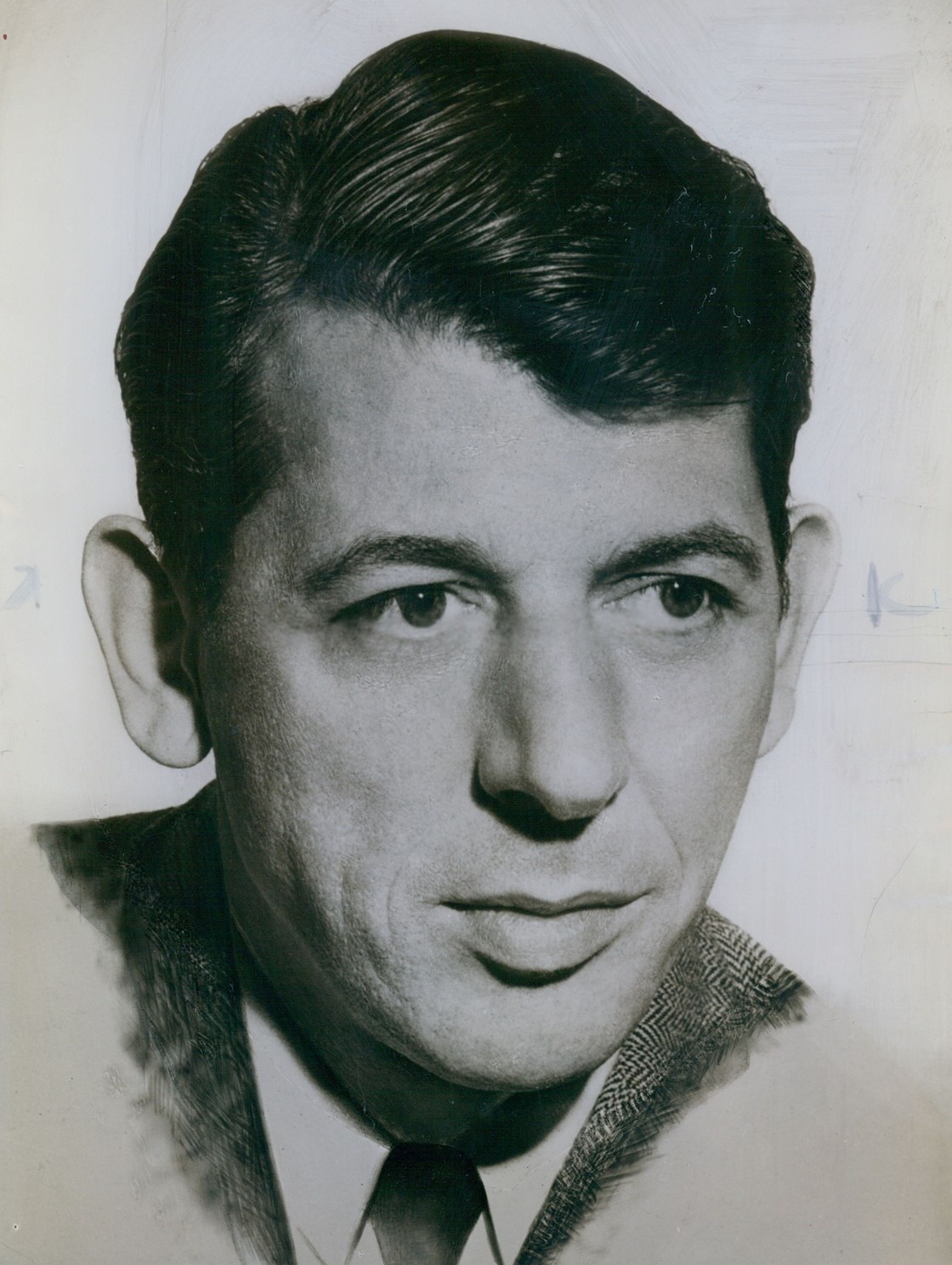
- Ciardi in 1961
- Born: June 24, 1916; Boston, Massachusetts, U.S.
- Died: March 30, 1986 (aged 69); Metuchen, New Jersey, U.S.
- Education: Bates College; Tufts University (transferred); University of Michigan
- Occupations: Poet; teacher; etymologist; translator
- Spouse: Judith Hostetter
- Children: Three
- Writing career
- Genres: Poet, etymologist
- Notable work: La Divina Commedia translation
- Notable awards: Hopwood Award

John Anthony Ciardi (/ˈtʃɑːrdi/ CHAR-dee; Italian: [ˈtʃardi]; June 24, 1916 – March 30, 1986) was an American poet, translator, and etymologist. While primarily known as a poet and translator of Dante's Divine Comedy, he also wrote several volumes of children's poetry, pursued etymology, contributed to the Saturday Review as a columnist and long-time poetry editor, directed the Bread Loaf Writers' Conference in Vermont, and recorded commentaries for National Public Radio.

In 1959, Ciardi published a book on how to read, write, and teach poetry, How Does a Poem Mean?, which has proven to be among the most-used books of its kind. At the peak of his popularity in the early 1960s, Ciardi also had a network television program on CBS, Accent. Ciardi's impact on poetry is perhaps best measured through the younger poets whom he influenced as a teacher and as editor of the Saturday Review.

== Biography ==
Ciardi was born at home in Boston's North End in 1916. His father, an Italian immigrant, died in an automobile accident in 1919, and he was raised by his Italian mother (who was illiterate) and his three older sisters. In 1921, his family moved to Medford, Massachusetts, where he attended public schools. His family members saved enough money to send him to college. He entered Bates College in Lewiston, Maine, before transferring to Tufts University in Boston to study under poet John Holmes. He graduated from Tufts in 1938, and the following year completed his MA at the University of Michigan. At Michigan he was awarded the Hopwood Prize for Homeward to America, a poetry collection which he submitted under the pseudonym "Thomas Aquinas".

Ciardi taught briefly at the University of Kansas City before joining the United States Army Air Forces in 1942, becoming a gunner on B-29s and flying some twenty missions over Japan before being transferred to desk duty in 1945. He was discharged in October 1945 with the rank of Technical Sergeant and with both the Air Medal and Oak Leaf Cluster. Ciardi's war diary, Saipan, was published posthumously in 1988. After the war, Ciardi returned to UKC for the spring semester 1946, where he met and, on July 28, married Myra Judith Hostetter, a journalist and journalism instructor. Immediately after the wedding, the couple left for a third-floor apartment at Ciardi's Medford, Massachusetts home, which his mother and sisters had put together for the man of their family and his new bride.

John Ciardi was a longtime resident of Metuchen, New Jersey. He died on Easter Sunday in 1986 of a heart attack, but not before composing his own epitaph:

Here, time concurring (and it does);
Lies Ciardi. If no kingdom come,
A kingdom was. Such as it was
This one beside it is a slum.

== Literary career ==
After the war, Mr. Ciardi returned briefly to Kansas State, before being named instructor [in 1946], and later assistant professor, in the Briggs Copeland chair at Harvard University, where he stayed until 1953. ... While at Harvard, Mr. Ciardi began his long association with the Bread Loaf Writers Conference at Middlebury College in Vermont, where he lectured on poetry for almost 30 years, half that time as director of the program.

Ciardi had published his first book of poems, Homeward to America, in 1940, before the war, and his next book, Other Skies, focusing on his wartime experiences, was published in 1947. His third book, Live Another Day, came out in 1949. In 1950, Ciardi edited a poetry collection, Mid-Century American Poets, which identified the best poets of the generation that had come into its own in the 1940s: Richard Wilbur, Muriel Rukeyser, John Frederick Nims, Karl Shapiro, Elizabeth Bishop, Theodore Roethke, Delmore Schwartz, Randall Jarrell, Robert Lowell, Ciardi himself, and several others. Each poet selected several poems for inclusion, plus his or her comments on the poetic principles that guided the compositions, addressing especially the issue of the "unintelligibility" of modern poetry.

Ciardi had begun translating Dante for his classes at Harvard and continued with the work throughout his time there. His translation of The Inferno was published in 1954. Dudley Fitts, himself an important mid-century translator, said of Ciardi's version, "[H]ere is our Dante, Dante for the first time translated into virile, tense American verse; a work of enormous erudition which (like its original) never forgets to be poetry; a shining event in a bad age." Joan Acocella (née Ross), however, noted "The constant stretching for a heartier, more modern and American idiom not only vulgarizes; it also guarantees that wherever Dante expresses himself by implication rather than by direct statement, Ciardi will either miss or ignore the nuance." The translation "is widely used at universities." Ciardi's translation of The Purgatorio followed in 1961 and The Paradiso in 1970. Ciardi's version of The Inferno was recorded and released by Folkways Records in 1954. Two years later, Ciardi would have his work featured again on an album titled, As If: Poems, New and Selected, by John Ciardi.

In 1953, Ciardi joined the English Department at Rutgers University in order to begin a writing program, but after eight successful years there, he resigned his professorship in 1961 in favor of several other more lucrative careers, especially fall and spring tours on the college lecture circuit, and to "devote himself fulltime to literary pursuits." (When he left Rutgers, he famously quipped that teaching was "planned poverty.") He was popular enough and interesting enough to warrant a pair of appearances in the early 1960s on The Tonight Show Starring Johnny Carson. He was the poetry editor of the Saturday Review from 1956 to 1972. In 1962 Ciardi wrote an editorial critical of the government's efforts to censor Henry Miller's Tropic of Cancer, which the book's publisher Barney Rosset, engaged in defense against legal action across the country, later acknowledged for its impact on public opinion, aiding the defense in the jury trials that followed. He wrote the 1959 poetry textbook How Does a Poem Mean? Ciardi was a "fellow of the National Academy of Arts and Sciences and a member and former president of the National Institute of Arts and Letters." He was one of the signers of the Humanist Manifesto.

For the last decade of his life, he reported on word histories on National Public Radio's Morning Edition, as an outgrowth of his series of books of etymologies, A Browser's Dictionary (1980), A Second Browser's Dictionary (1983) and Good Words to You (posthumously published in 1987). The weekly three-minute spot on etymology was called Word In Your Ear. He also taught at the University of Florida.

Among 20th-century American men of letters, he maintained a notably high profile and level of popularity with the general public, as well as a reputation for considerable craftsmanship in his output. Burton Raffel summed up Ciardi's career: "Blessed with a fine voice, a ready wit, and a relentless honesty, Ciardi became in many ways an archetype of the existentially successful twentieth-century American poet, peripatetic, able to fit into and exploit chinks in the great American scheme of things, while never fitting in as either a recognized peg or hole."

== Legacy ==
Critic and poet Kenneth Rexroth described Ciardi as "... singularly unlike most American poets with their narrow lives and feuds. He is more like a very literate, gently appetitive, Italo-American airplane pilot, fond of deep simple things like his wife and kids, his friends and students, Dante's verse and good food and wine." "During his years at Bread Loaf and at the Saturday Review, Ciardi established a reputation as a tough, sometimes harsh, critic." "His review of Anne Morrow Lindbergh's 1956 book The Unicorn and Other Poems touched off what the Review's editor, Norman Cousins, described as the biggest storm of reader protest in the magazine's history." "Ciardi defended his stand, noting that it was the reviewer's duty to damn when warranted." In similar circumstances, Ciardi "described Robert Frost's 'Stopping by Woods on a Snowy Evening' as expressing the death wish of its speaker". May Sarton, for example, accused Ciardi of "hat[ing her] guts and [of doing] everything he could to destroy [her]" in describing the difficulties faced by women poets.

Working for the Saturday Review while overseas, Ciardi sent Harold Norse's poem, "Victor Emmanuel Monument (Rome)", back to the U.S. to be published in the April 13, 1957 issue. The poem described Italian soldiers as flamboyant prostitutes. In Ciardi's biography, Cifelli quotes several lines from the poem indicating that the soldiers were "all the brilliance of male panache", and "picking up extra cash from man and boy". Ciardi was asked to leave by Italian officials by June 16. Knowing that he could be arrested, he continued to write letters of apology to the government, asking for reprieve. Yet he refused to leave, as he was not scheduled to depart till later on in the summer.

Ciardi did not fare well in the counterculture of the late 1960s and 1970s. He published harsh criticisms of the Beat poets but championed William Burroughs's Naked Lunch. He had been a fresh, sometimes brash, voice for modern poetry, but as he approached his fiftieth birthday in 1966, he had become entrenched and his voice became bitter, sometimes bumptious. He urged his only remaining students, those at Bread Loaf for two weeks each August, to learn how to write within the tradition before abandoning it in favor of undisciplined, improvisational free verse. Ciardi was unceremoniously fired from Bread Loaf in 1972, after serving seventeen years as director, and not having missed a single year on the poetry staff since 1947.

John Ciardi has come to be regarded as a mid-level, mid-20th century formalist, one who was replaced in literary history by the more daring and colorful Beat, Confessional, and Black Mountain poets. However, with revisionism chipping away at the reputations of the latter groups, and the brief emergence of a renewed interest in formalism in the late 20th century, Ciardi's type of mostly understated verse enjoyed a small resurgence in popularity, one that has passed as the interest in formalism proved shallow and short lived.

In recognition of Ciardi's work, a John Ciardi Lifetime Achievement Award for Poetry is given annually to an Italian American poet for lifetime achievement in poetry.

National Public Radio (NPR) continues to make Ciardi's commentaries available. Etymologies and commentary on words such as daisy, demijohn, jimmies, gerrymander, glitch, snafu, cretin, and baseball, among others, are available from the archives of their website. NPR also began making his commentaries available as podcasts, starting in November 2005.

== Awards ==
"In 1956, Ciardi received the Prix de Rome from the American Academy of Arts and Letters. In 1982, the National Council of Teachers of English awarded him its award for excellence in children's poetry." He also won American Platform Association's Carl Sandburg Award in 1980.

== Bibliography ==
- Homeward to America, 1940. Poems.
- Other Skies, 1947. Poems.
- Live Another Day, 1949. Poems.
- Mid-Century American Poems, 1950. Anthology edited by Ciardi.
- From Time to Time, 1951. Poems.
- "The Hypnoglyph", 1953. Short story in Fantasy & Science Fiction, using the pseudonym "John Anthony".
- The Inferno. 1954. Translation.
- As If: Poems New and Selected, 1955.
- I Marry You, 1958. Poems.
- 39 Poems, 1959.
- The Reason for the Pelican, 1959. Children's poems.
- How Does a Poem Mean?, 1959. Poetry textbook.
- Scrappy the Pup, 1960. Children's poems.
- In the Stoneworks, 1961. Poems.
- The Purgatorio, 1961. Translation.
- I Met a Man, 1961. Children's poems.
- The Man Who Sang the Sillies, 1961. Children's poems.
- In Fact, 1962. Poems.
- The Wish-Tree, 1962. Children's story.
- You Read to Me, I'll Read to You, 1962. Children's poems.
- Dialogue with an Audience, 1963. Saturday Review controversies and other selected essays.
- John J. Plenty and Fiddler Dan, 1963. Children's poem.
- Person to Person, 1964. Poems.
- You Know Who, 1964. J.B. Lippincott. Edward Gorey, illustrator. Children's poems.
- The King Who Saved Himself from Being Saved, 1966. Children's story in verse.
- This Strangest Everything, 1966. Poems.
- The Monster Den, 1966. Children's poems.
- An Alphabestiary, 1967. Poems.
- The Paradiso, 1970. Translation.
- Someone Could Win a Polar Bear, 1970. Children's poems.
- Lives of X, 1971. Verse autobiography.
- Manner of Speaking, 1972. Saturday Review columns.
- The Little That Is All, 1974. Poems.
- Fast & Slow, 1975. Children's poems.
- How Does a Poem Mean?, 1975. Revised second edition. With Miller Williams.
- The Divine Comedy, 1977. All three sections published together.
- Limericks: Too Gross or Two Dozen Dirty Dozen Stanzas, 1978. With Isaac Asimov.
- For Instance, 1979. Poems.
- A Browser's Dictionary, 1980. Etymology.
- A Grossery of Limericks, 1981. With Isaac Asimov.
- A Second Browser's Dictionary, 1983. Etymology.
- Selected Poems, 1984.
- The Birds of Pompeii, 1985. Poems.
- Doodle Soup, 1985. Children's poems.
- Good Words to You, 1987. Etymology.
- Poems of Love and Marriage, 1988.
- Saipan: The War Diary of John Ciardi, 1988.
- Blabberhead, Bobble-Bud & Spade, 1988. Collection of children's poems.
- Ciardi Himself: Fifteen Essays in the Reading, Writing, and Teaching of Poetry, 1989.
- Echoes: Poems Left Behind, 1989.
- The Hopeful Trout and Other Limericks, 1989. Children's poems.
- Mummy Took Lessons and Other Poems, 1990. Children's poems.
- Stations of the Air, 1993. Poems.
- The Collected Poems of John Ciardi, 1997. Edited by Edward M. Cifelli.
