= Lockheed Model 8 Sirius =

Family of touring aircraft

Model 8 Sirius
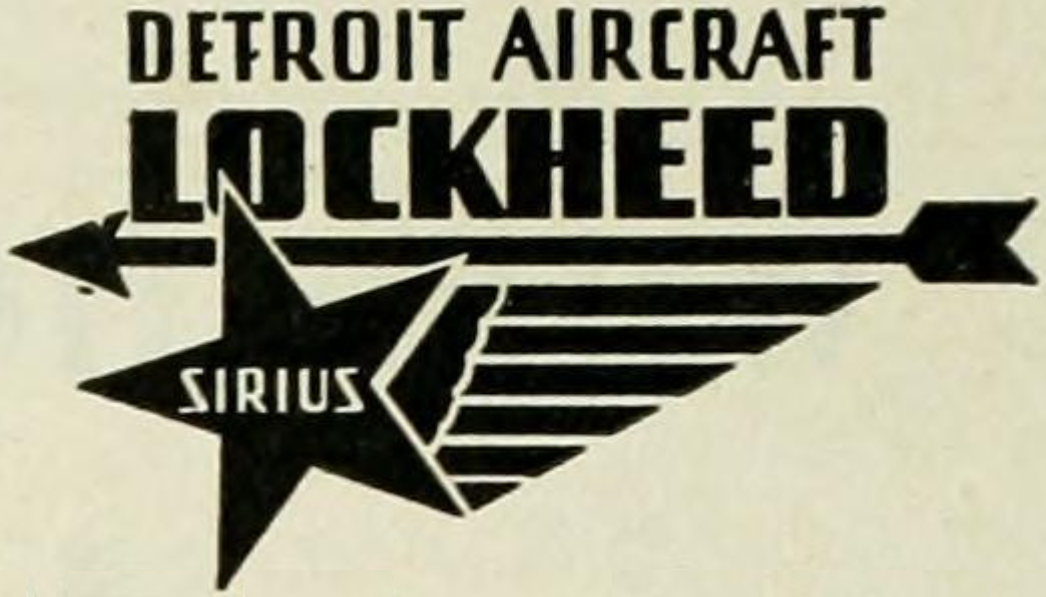

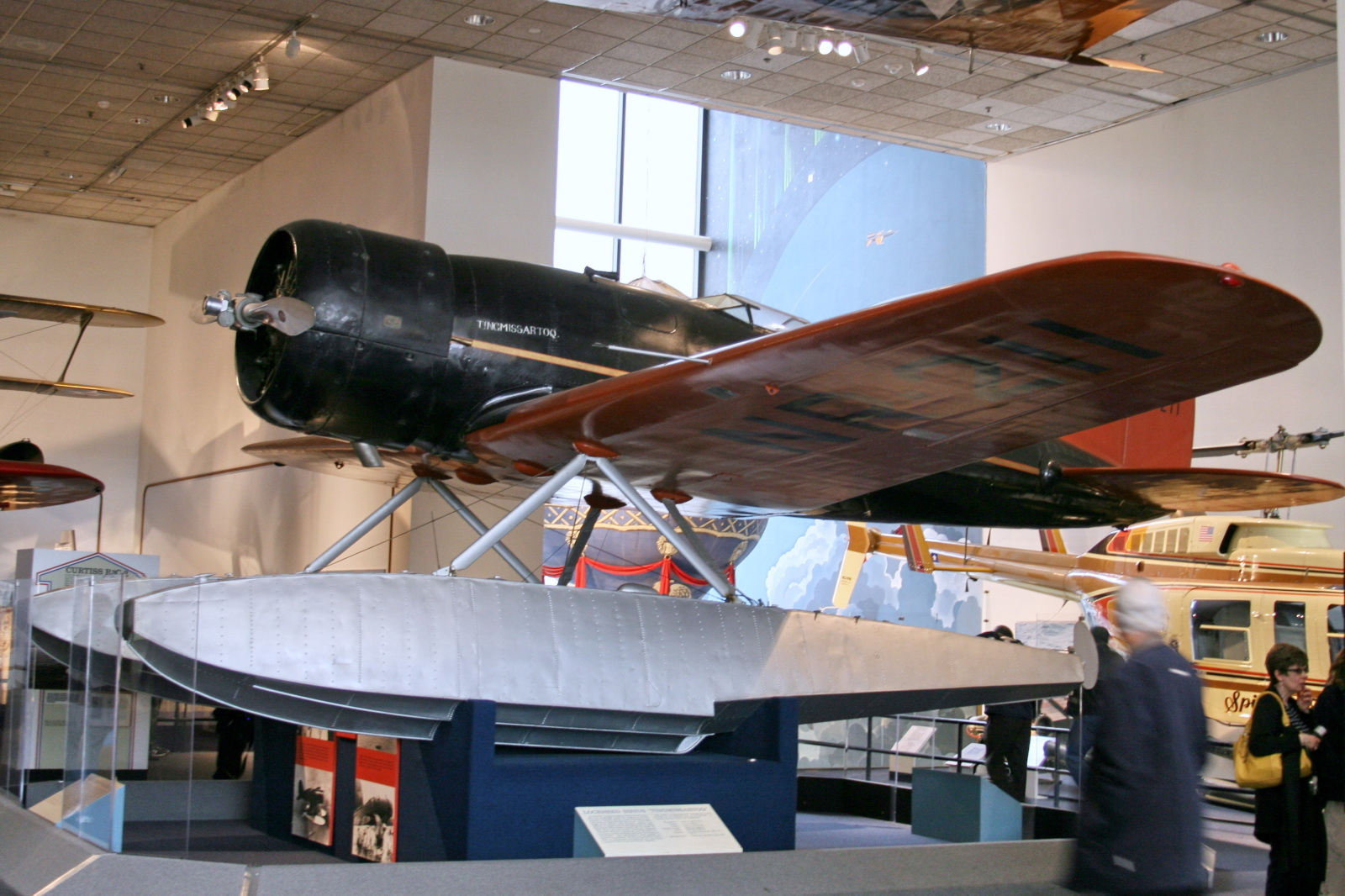
- Sirius at National Air and Space Museum

General information
- Type: Utility transport
- Manufacturer: Lockheed Aircraft Limited
- Designer: Jack Northrop; Gerard Vultee
- Number built: 15

History
- Introduction date: 1929
- First flight: 1929
- Variant: Lockheed Altair

The Lockheed Model 8 Sirius is a single-engined, propeller-driven monoplane designed and built by Jack Northrop and Gerard Vultee while they were engineers at Lockheed in 1929, at the request of Charles Lindbergh.

== History ==
In 1929 and 1930 15 Sirius aircraft were constructed.

The first and best known Sirius was bought by Lindbergh and named Tingmissartoq which in 1931, as NR211, was turned into a float plane. Lindbergh and his wife Anne Morrow Lindbergh flew it to the Far East, where she wrote a book about their experiences there entitled North to the Orient. The aircraft was damaged in Hankou, China, when it capsized while being lowered off the aircraft carrier HMS Hermes, and had to be sent to Lockheed to be repaired.

In 1931, György Endresz and Sándor Magyar made a successful US–Hungary transatlantic flight with a Lockheed Sirius 8A aircraft named Justice for Hungary.

In 1933, the Lindberghs set out again with their Sirius, now upgraded with a more powerful engine, a new directional gyro, and an artificial horizon. This time, their route would take them across the northern Atlantic, with no particular destination, but primarily to scout for potential new airline routes for Pan Am. While at a refueling stop in Angmagssalik, Greenland, the Inuit of the area gave the Sirius a nickname, "Tingmissartoq" or "one who flies like a bird". They continued on their flight and made many stops in Europe, Russia, then south to Africa, back across the southern Atlantic to Brazil and back over New York City at the end of 1933, after 30,000 miles and 21 countries; droves of people turned out to greet them as they landed.

The aircraft was in the American Museum of Natural History in New York City until 1955, when ownership was transferred to the National Museum of the United States Air Force in Dayton, Ohio. It was given to the Smithsonian Institution in 1959, and it went on display at the National Air and Space Museum when the original facility opened on the National Mall in 1976.

== Variants ==
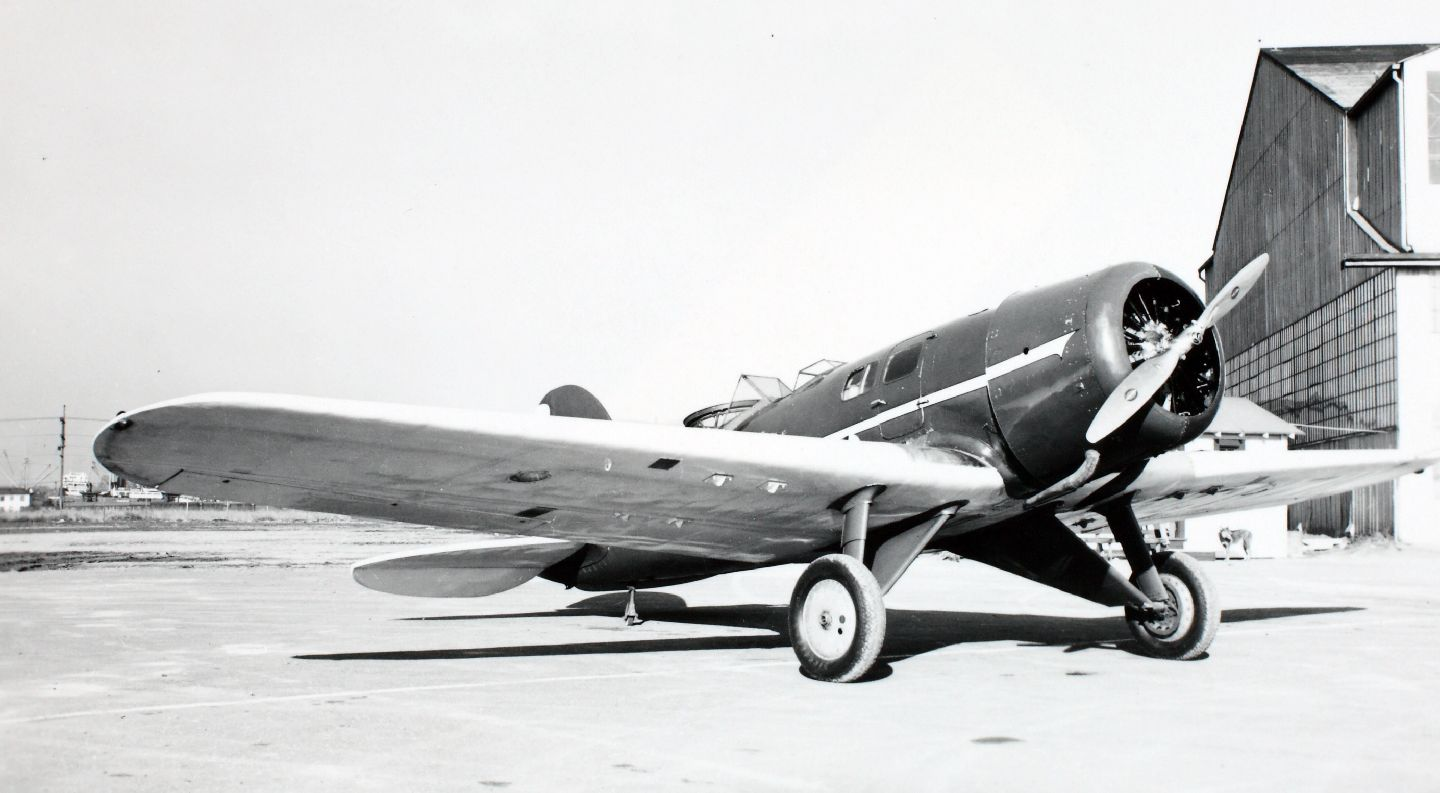
Paul Mantz's Lockheed Sirius photo ship

Lockheed 8 Sirius
Single-engine, two-seat, long-range, high-performance aircraft; one built for Charles Lindbergh.
Sirius 8
First production version, similar to the Lockheed 8 Sirius; one built.
Sirius 8A
Equipped with an enlarged tail surface; eight built.
Sirius 8C
Four-seat version fitted with an enclosed cabin seating two passengers, located between the engine and the pilot's cockpit; one built.
DL-2
Metal fuselage and wooden wings. One built by the Detroit Aircraft Corporation.

== Operators ==
Spain

- Spanish Republican Air Force

== Specifications (Lindbergh's Sirius 8) ==
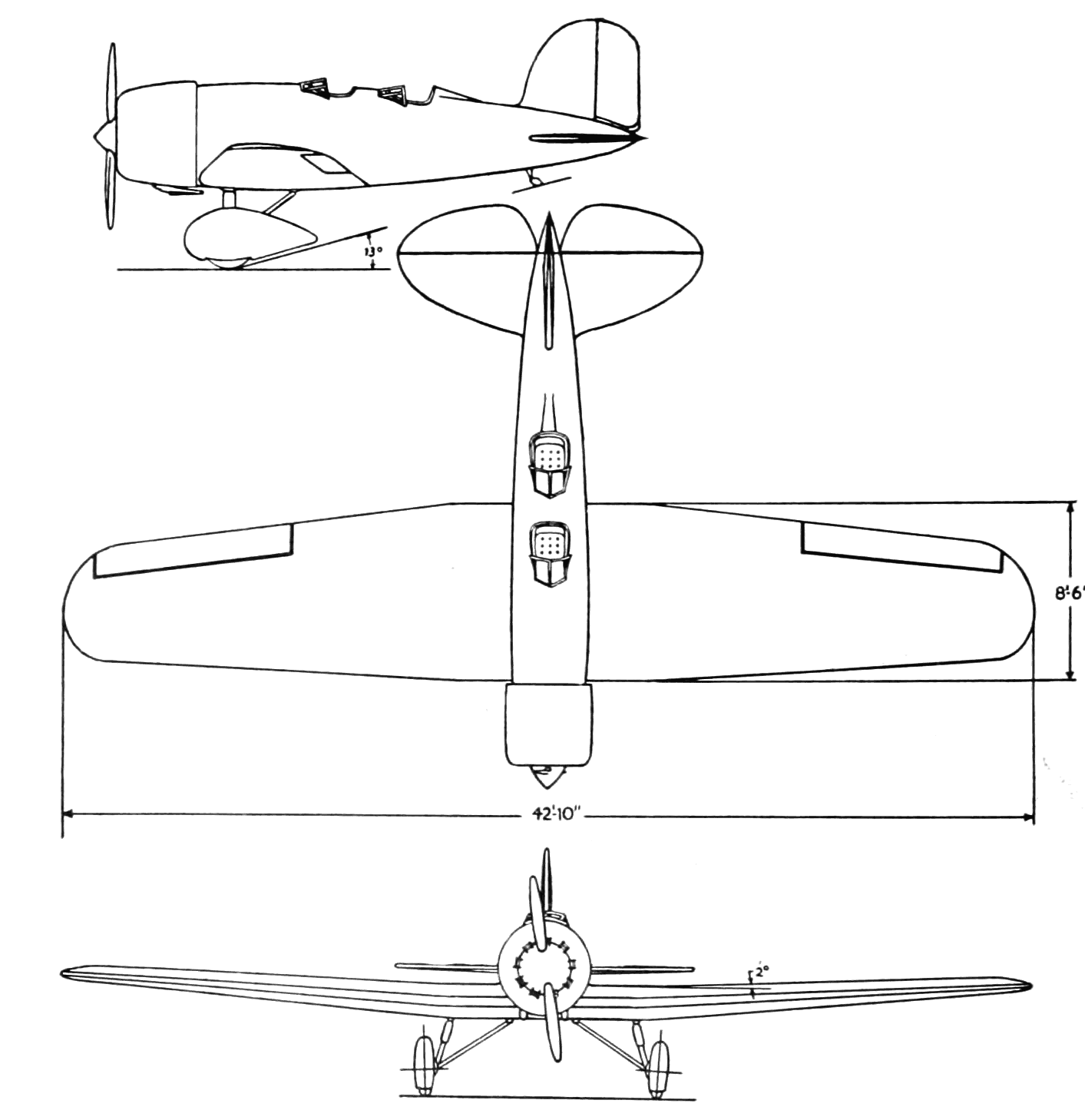
Lockheed 8 Sirius 3-view drawing from Aero Digest March,1930

Data from Lockheed Aircraft since 1913

General characteristics

- Crew: two
- Length: 27 ft 1 in (8.26 m)
- Wingspan: 42 ft 9 1/4 in (13.037 m)
- Height: 9 ft 3 in (2.82 m)
- Wing area: 294.1 sq ft (27.32 m^{2})
- Empty weight: 4,289 lb (1,945 kg)
- Gross weight: 7,099 lb (3,220 kg)
- Fuel capacity: 416 US gal (1,570 L)
- Powerplant: 1 × Pratt & Whitney Wasp radial engine, 450 hp (340 kW)

Performance

- Maximum speed: 185 mph (298 km/h, 161 kn)
- Cruise speed: 150 mph (240 km/h, 130 kn)
- Range: 975 mi (1,569 km, 847 nmi)
- Service ceiling: 26,100 ft (8,000 m)
- Rate of climb: 1,280 ft/min (6.5 m/s)

== See also ==
- List of Lockheed aircraft
