= Van Paassen =

Van Paassen is a Dutch surname. Notable people with the surname include:

- Peter van Paassen (born 1978), Dutch basketball player
- Pierre van Paassen (1895–1968), American journalist, writer, and Unitarian minister
- Sanne van Paassen (born 1988), Dutch cyclist
