= The Unicorn and Other Poems =

Poetry collection by Anne Morrow Lindbergh

The Unicorn and Other Poems: 1935–1955
- Author: Anne Morrow Lindbergh
- Language: English
- Publisher: Pantheon Books
- Publication date: 1956
- Publication place: United States
- Pages: 86

The Unicorn and Other Poems is a 1956 poetry collection by the American writer Anne Morrow Lindbergh. The poems span from the period 1935–1955.

== Contents ==
- Love. The man and the child
- Alms
- The little mermaid
- Even
- Two citadels
- A leaf, a flower, and a stone
- Interior tree
- Death. A final cry
- No angels
- Elegy under the stars
- Testament
- Presence
- Mountain
- All saints' day
- Second sowing
- Captive spirit. Losing in
- Security
- Dogwood
- No harvest ripening
- The stone
- Pilgrim
- Saint for our time
- The unicorn
- Open sky. Space
- Winter tree
- Pas de deux-winter
- Ascent
- Flight of birds
- Back to the islands
- Wind of time. Presentiment
- Within the wave
- Family album
- Broken shell
- Revisitation
- Bare tre

== Reception ==
The book sold well but was overall poorly received by critics, which made Lindbergh feel ashamed of her poems. Kirkus Reviews described the book as "the poetic versions of almost the same themes as Gift from the Sea", and wrote that these themes "are caught up here in a new freshness which will have its appeal to women who experience many of these emotions in common". The critic wrote that the quality is high enough "to win Anne Lindbergh a place among outstanding women poets".
