= Dearly Beloved (novel) =

1962 novel by Anne Morrow Lindbergh

- Author: Anne Morrow Lindbergh
- Language: English
- Publisher: Harcourt Brace
- Publication date: 1962
- Publication place: United States
- Pages: 202

Dearly Beloved is a 1962 novel by the American writer Anne Morrow Lindbergh. It takes place during a New England wedding ceremony and consists of the reflections of the wedding guests.

== Reception ==
The book sold more than 100,000 copies and was on the New York Times Best Seller list for nearly 30 weeks. Kirkus Reviews wrote: "It is a sensitive—at times a tragic—book, penetrating the depths of men's and women's souls, as line after line of the service is spoken, with its meaning enlarged, heightened by the lives of the listeners. ... The composite that emerges is a many hued tapestry, almost flawless in projection and performance."
