= Jon Lindbergh =

American underwater diver (1932–2021)

- Born: Jon Morrow Lindbergh; August 16, 1932; New York City, U.S.
- Died: July 29, 2021 (aged 88); Lewisburg, West Virginia, U.S.
- Education: Stanford University; University of California, San Diego
- Occupations: U.S. Navy Underwater Demolition Team, commercial diver, aquanaut
- Spouses: Barbara Robbins (m. 1954, divorced) Karen Pryor (m. 1983; div. 1997): Maura Jansen
- Children: 8; including Erik
- Parent(s): Charles Lindbergh; Anne Morrow Lindbergh

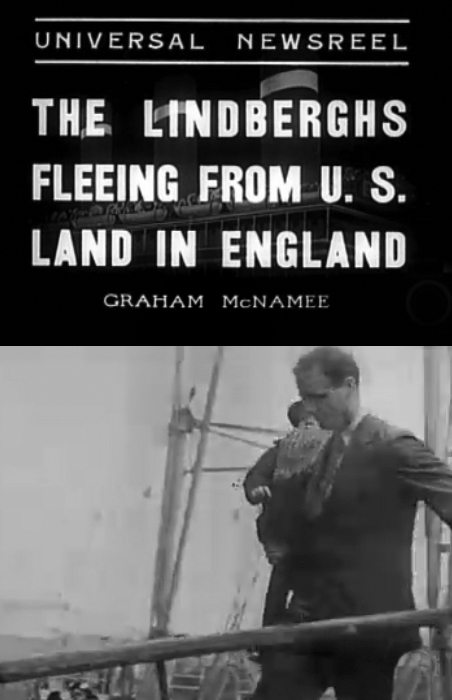
Newsreel image of Charles and Jon Lindbergh arriving in England in 1936.

Jon Morrow Lindbergh (August 16, 1932 – July 29, 2021) was an American underwater diver. He worked as a United States Navy demolition expert and as a commercial diver, and was one of the world's earliest aquanauts in the 1960s. He was also a pioneer in cave diving, and one of the children of aviators Charles Lindbergh and Anne Morrow Lindbergh.

== Early life ==
Lindbergh was born on August 16, 1932, five months after the kidnapping and death of his older brother, Charles Lindbergh Jr. Jon's parents had discovered the name "Jon" in a book about Scandinavian history. During his mother's pregnancy with him, his parents received large numbers of letters and phone calls threatening his life. In 1935, photographers forced a car in which one of Jon's teachers was driving him home off the road in order to take pictures of him. Jon then began to be protected by a detective with a sawed-off shotgun. The Lindberghs soon decided to leave the United States and traveled to the United Kingdom.

Lindbergh's father tried to teach him how to swim when he was three years old by repeatedly throwing him into the deep end of a swimming pool. In spring 1940 (when he was seven), his father placed him in a pasture with a butting ram in order to learn to protect himself from it. As a teenager, Lindbergh was allowed to make a solo three-day boat trip. He also learned to fly before leaving for college, but his father advised him not to pursue aviation as a career.

== Cave diver, U.S. Navy and commercial diver ==
In March 1953, when Lindbergh was a marine biology student at Stanford University, he made the first successful cave dive in the United States at Bower Cave in California. The dive was part of an expedition organized by speleologist Raymond de Saussure. Lindbergh discovered a hidden chamber inside the cave, confirming Saussure's theory that the nearby swimming spa was fed from such a chamber. Lindbergh returned the next month to photograph the underwater lake from a rubber raft. Lindbergh also took up mountain climbing and skydiving while in college. After his second year, he moved out of his dormitory into a tent in the foothills of the Coast Range. As a senior at Stanford, Lindbergh took part in an expedition to Mount Shasta in California, during which Werner Hopf, a 30-year-old electronics engineer from the Stanford Research Institute, fell and was seriously injured. Hopf died despite the efforts of Lindbergh and his other companions to save him.

Lindbergh graduated from Stanford, where he had been a member of the Navy ROTC, and did postgraduate work at the University of California, San Diego. He served for three years as a frogman with the United States Navy Underwater Demolition Team (UDT), reaching the rank of Lieutenant. He then became a commercial diver, working for Offshore Divers, Inc. in Santa Barbara, California, and making dives from offshore oil rigs on the West Coast of the United States at depths between 230 and 400 feet.

In 1966, as part of a team from Ocean Systems, Inc., Jon Lindbergh participated in the recovery efforts when a hydrogen bomb was lost off the coast of Spain.

== Man in Sea project ==
In June–July 1964, Lindbergh participated in Edwin Link's second Man in Sea experiment, conducted in the Berry Islands (a chain in the Bahamas). Lindbergh's fellow diver for this venture was Robert Sténuit, who had become the world's first aquanaut in 1962. Sténuit and Lindbergh stayed in Link's SPID habitat (Submersible, Portable, Inflatable Dwelling) for 49 hours underwater at a depth of 432 feet, breathing a helium-oxygen mixture.

== Personal life ==
Lindbergh married Barbara Robbins on March 20, 1954, in Northfield, Illinois. They were the parents of six children, including aviator and artist Erik Lindbergh (born in 1965). His second marriage was to Karen Pryor, daughter of author Philip Wylie; they divorced in 1997. Lindbergh was married to Maura Jansen, with whom he had two daughters.

When his father was dying, Lindbergh took charge of transporting him from New York City to Hawaii to die, and helped build his father's grave.

Lindbergh's elder brother, Charles Augustus Lindbergh Jr., the first of six children born to Charles and Anne Lindbergh, died in 1932 in the infamous kidnapping — what many termed at the time "the crime of the century". Jon's other Lindbergh siblings are: Land Morrow Lindbergh (born 1937), writer Anne Spencer Lindbergh (1940–1993), conservationist Scott Lindbergh (born 1942), and writer Reeve Lindbergh (born 1945).

He died from renal cancer in Lewisburg, West Virginia, on July 29, 2021, at the age of 88.
