= Listen! The Wind =

1938 book by Anne Morrow Lindbergh

- Author: Anne Morrow Lindbergh
- Language: English
- Publisher: Harcourt, Brace and Co.
- Publication date: 1938
- Publication place: United States
- Pages: 275

Listen! The Wind is a 1938 book by the American writer Anne Morrow Lindbergh. It tells the story of Lindbergh's and her husband Charles Lindbergh's 1933 flight from Africa to South America across the Atlantic Ocean. The book focuses on the last ten days of the flight, when weather conditions and illness caused trouble for the couple. The book has a foreword and map drawings by Charles Lindbergh.

The title is taken from the British poet Humbert Wolfe's poem "Autumn Resignation". When the Lindberghs were waiting for enough wind to commence the flight in Gambia, Anne had kept reciting two lines from the poem: "Listen! The wind is rising, and the air is wild with leaves".

Just like Lindbergh's first book, North to the Orient, Listen! The Wind became a bestseller and was among the ten bestselling non-fiction books in the United States for two years in a row. It received the National Book Award for Nonfiction.
