= Excuse My Dust (1951 film) =

1951 film by Roy Rowland

- Theatrical release poster
- Directed by: Roy Rowland; Edward Sedgwick (uncredited)
- Written by: George Wells; Stephanie Nordli (uncredited); Buster Keaton (uncredited)
- Based on: Excuse My Dust; 1943 book by Bellamy Partridge
- Produced by: Jack Cummings
- Starring: Red Skelton; Sally Forrest; Macdonald Carey; William Demarest; Monica Lewis; Raymond Walburn
- Cinematography: Alfred Gilks
- Edited by: Irvine Warburton
- Music by: George Stoll
- Production company: Metro-Goldwyn-Mayer
- Distributed by: Loew's, Inc.
- Release date: June 27, 1951 (New York)
- Running time: 82 minutes
- Country: United States
- Language: English
- Budget: $1,789,000
- Box office: $2,298,000

Excuse My Dust is a 1951 musical comedy film starring Red Skelton and directed by Roy Rowland and an uncredited Edward Sedgwick. The film is based on the 1943 book of the same name by Bellamy Partridge.

== Plot ==
In 1895, amateur inventor Joe Belden has created a sensation in his Indiana hometown over his new "horseless carriage". It runs on gasoline, but the townspeople aren't impressed and only Joe's mother and his sweetheart Liz Bullitt are supportive. Mechanical breakdowns cause Joe to become even more unpopular with some, including Liz's father, who prefers his daughter's other suitor, the educated and refined Cyrus Ransom, Jr.

A $5,000 first prize in a road race attracts many newfangled contraptions. Cy enters a race with a vehicle fueled by ether and cheats in order to drive Joe from the road. He succeeds, but Liz comes to the rescue and joins Joe the rest of the way.

== Cast ==
- Red Skelton as Joe Belden
- Sally Forrest as Liz Bullitt (singing voice dubbed by Gloria Gray)
- Macdonald Carey as Cyrus Random, Jr.
- William Demarest as Harvey Bullitt
- Monica Lewis as Daisy Lou
- Raymond Walburn as Mayor Fred Haskell
- Jane Darwell as Mrs. Belden
- Lillian Bronson as Mrs. Matilda Bullitt
- Herbert Anderson as Ben Parrott
- Paul Harvey as Cyrus Random, Sr.
- Marjorie Wood as Mrs. Cyrus Random Sr.
- Lee Scott as Horace Antler
- Alex Gerry as Mr. Antler
- Jim Hayward as Nick Tosca
- Will Wright as Race judge

== Production ==
Van Johnson had been considered for the lead role before Red Skelton was cast. The role was an opportunity for Skelton to play straight comedy rather than the slapstick style that had been his trademark.

== Music ==
- "I'd Like to Take You Out Dreaming": Performed by Macdonald Carey and male chorus
- "Lorelei Brown": Performed by Monica Lewis and chorus, introduced by Herbert Anderson and Sally Forrest
- "Goin' Steady": Sung by Macdonald Carey, Monica Lewis, Sally Forrest, Red Skelton and chorus
- "Spring Has Sprung": Performed by Red Skelton and Sally Forrest (dubbed by Gloria Gray)
- "Get a Horse": Performed by Macdonald Carey, William Demarest and chorus
- "That's for Children": Performed by Monica Lewis, Red Skelton and chorus
- "Lorelei Brown" (instrumental reprise): Danced by Sally Forrest and male chorus in French Apache style
- "Spring Has Sprung" (reprise): Sung by Sally Forrest (dubbed by Gloria Gray)

== Reception ==
In a contemporary review for The New York Times, critic Bosley Crowther wrote: "As regular as Sunday school picnics in the good old summertime, Metro delivers a musical full of ice cream and the wholesome out-of-doors. Often these summertime entries are bathed in a Golden Nineties haze which cheerfully enwraps a cornucopia of horses, buggies, bands and lemonade, not to mention mobs of youthful blades and beauties in white flannels and old-fashioned bathing suits. This year the entry also rings in Red Skelton and a fleet of antique cars of the gasoline-buggy era. 'Excuse My Dust' is its tag."

According to MGM records, the film earned $1,645,000 in the U.S. and Canada and $653,000 elsewhere, resulting in a loss of $501,000.
