= The Steep Ascent =

1944 novella by Anne Morrow Lindbergh

- First edition
- Author: Anne Morrow Lindbergh
- Language: English
- Publisher: Harcourt, Brace and Company
- Publication date: March 1944
- Publication place: United States
- Pages: 120

The Steep Ascent is a 1944 novella by the American writer Anne Morrow Lindbergh. It follows a pregnant woman and her pilot husband as they fly from England over France and the Alps to Italy.

== Reception ==
The book was published in March 1944. Due to the negative reception of her previous book, The Wave of the Future, which was generally perceived as promoting totalitarianism and fascism, the print run was limited to 25,000 copies, significantly fewer than her earlier books.

The early reviews were negative, comparing the novel unfavorably to Antoine de Saint-Exupéry. Later reviews were more positive and the book went on to sell well.

Kirkus Reviews wrote that "the literature of flight has no more gifted contributor than Anne Morrow Lindbergh", and that "her prose style has a rhythm tuned to the rhythm of flight". The critic commended the use of symbology, but wrote that "the immediate value and appeal of the book lies not there, but rather in the spiritual message it carries for each reader".
