= Tingmissartoq =

Airplane flown by the Lindberghs

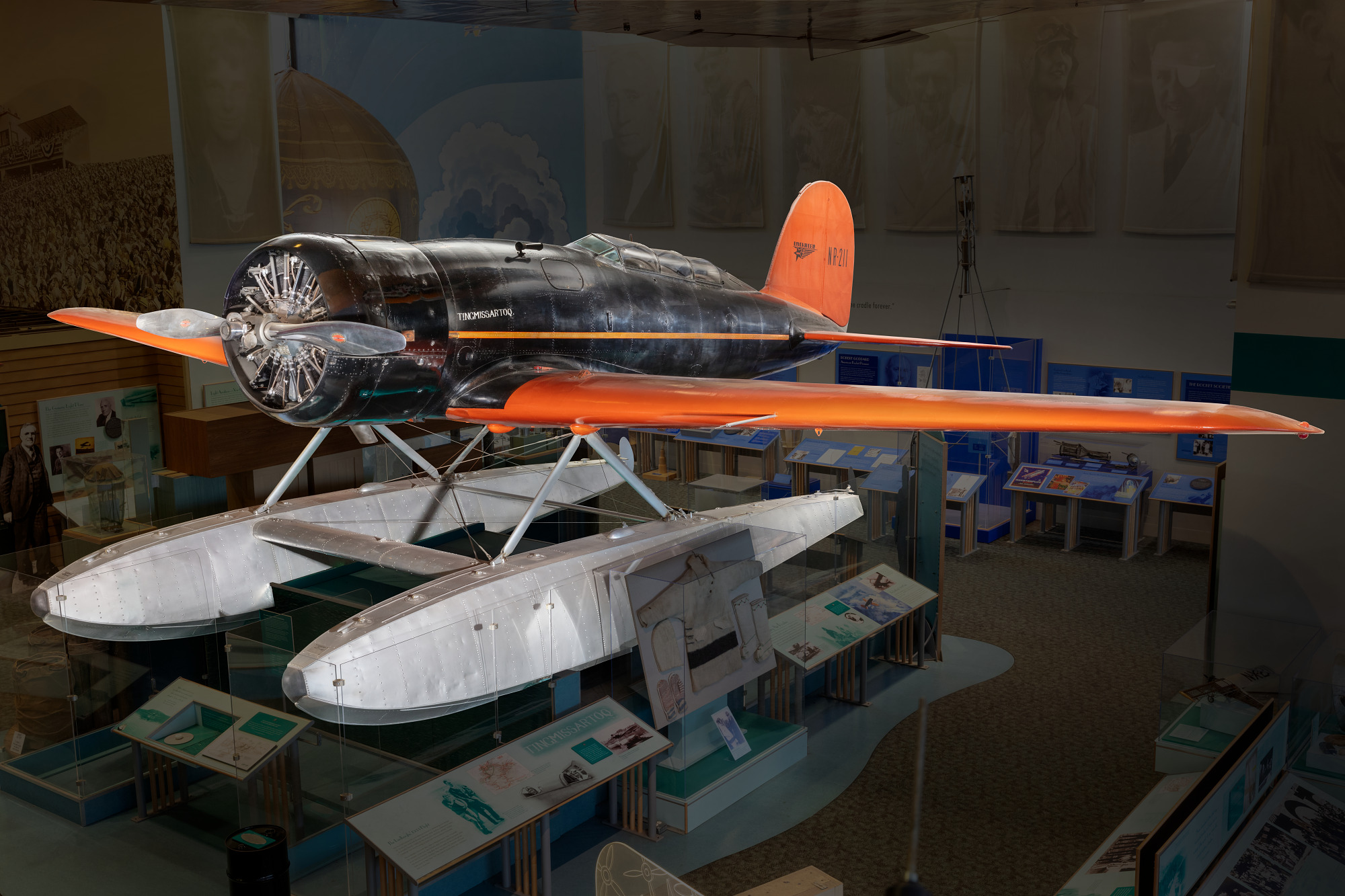
- Tingmissartoq on display at the National Air and Space Museum, Washington DC

General information
- Type: Lockheed Model 8 Sirius
- Manufacturer: Lockheed Aircraft Company
- Owners: Charles Lindbergh & Anne Morrow Lindbergh
- Construction number: 140
- Registration: NR211

History
- Manufactured: November 1929
- In service: November 1929 to 6 December 1933
- Preserved at: Currently preserved at the National Air and Space Museum, Washington DC
- Fate: Retired to the American Museum of Natural History

Tingmissartoq was the name given to a Lockheed Model 8 Sirius flown by Charles and Anne Morrow Lindbergh in the 1930s. Tingmissartoq means "one who flies like a big bird"; the plane was thus christened by an Inuk boy in Godthaab (Nuuk), Greenland, who painted the word on its side.

== First flight ==
Lockheed had introduced its Sirius model in 1929; this particular craft appears to have been built to specifications sometime between then and 1931, when the Lindberghs planned to fly to the Orient via the Great Circle Route. A low-wing monoplane, Tingmissartoq was outfitted with Edo floats, as much of the planned route was over water.

The trip was described solely as a vacation flight, with "no start or finish, no diplomatic or commercial significance, and no records to be sought." It began in North Haven, Maine, from which point the couple flew to Ottawa. From there they flew to various other sites in Canada, including Moose Factory, Churchill, Baker Lake, and Aklavik, before heading to Point Barrow, Alaska. They continued on to Shismaref and Nome, after which they crossed the Pacific Ocean to Petropavlosk. From here they continued over the Kuril Islands to Tokyo, where they were enthusiastically welcomed. The trip continued on to China, with its final stop on Lotus Lake near Nanjing made on September 19.

Anne Morrow Lindbergh described the trip, and her impressions and experiences, in her book North to the Orient.

== Accident at Hankou ==
While at Hankou, the plane, with the Lindberghs aboard, was being lowered into the Yangtze River from the British aircraft carrier HMS Hermes (95) when it capsized accidentally. One wing hit a ship's cable and was damaged, necessitating the craft's return to the United States for repairs.

== Second journey ==
Tingmissartoq was to see action again in 1933 as a result of international interest in the development of commercial air transport. Pan American Airways, Imperial Airways, Deutsche Luft Hansa, KLM, and Air France collaborated on a study of international air routes. The assigned areas were Newfoundland to Europe via Greenland; Newfoundland via the great circle route to Ireland; Newfoundland southeast to the Azores and Lisbon; Miami, Bermuda, the Azores, and Lisbon; and across the South Atlantic from Brazil, to Cape Verde. Pan American was given the responsibility for the first of these, and sent Lindbergh, as the company's technical advisor, to survey the route. Accompanied once more by Anne, he took off from New York City on July 9 in the rebuilt craft. The purpose of the trip was to gain as much data as possible on the area to be covered.

The plane had been fitted with a Sperry artificial horizon and a directional gyro since its previous flight. The engine, too, was new, a Wright Cyclone SR1820-F2 of 710 hp. All possible spaces were used, including the wings and floats; these contained the gasoline tanks. There was also plenty of emergency equipment for use in the event of a forced landing.

To maintain radio contact with the couple, Pan American hired a Danish ship, the Jellinge, to stay within range in the area of Labrador, Greenland, and Iceland. It also delivered advance supplies for them to Halifax, St. John's, Cartwright, Greenland, and Iceland.

Tingmissartoq flew first from New York to Hopedale, Labrador, hugging the eastern Canada–US border along the way. From here the Lindberghs made the first major hop over water, flying 650 miles to Godthaab. The couple then crisscrossed Greenland to Baffin Island and back, and then flew to Iceland. They continued the trip by flying around the world; visiting first the major cities of Europe, they continued to Moscow, then down Africa's west coast, and across the South Atlantic to South America. Here, they flew down the Amazon River, and then turned north through Trinidad and Barbados before returning to the United States. They returned to New York on December 19, having traveled 30,000 miles and visited four continents and twenty-one countries. The information they provided proved invaluable in planning transatlantic air transport routes.

Tingmissartoq was on display in the American Museum of Natural History in New York City until 1955, when it was acquired by the National Museum of the United States Air Force in Dayton, Ohio. It was transferred to the Smithsonian Institution in 1959, and is currently on display in the "Pioneers of Flight" gallery of the National Air and Space Museum in Washington, DC.
