= Pauline Dunwell Partridge =

American writer (1879–1944)

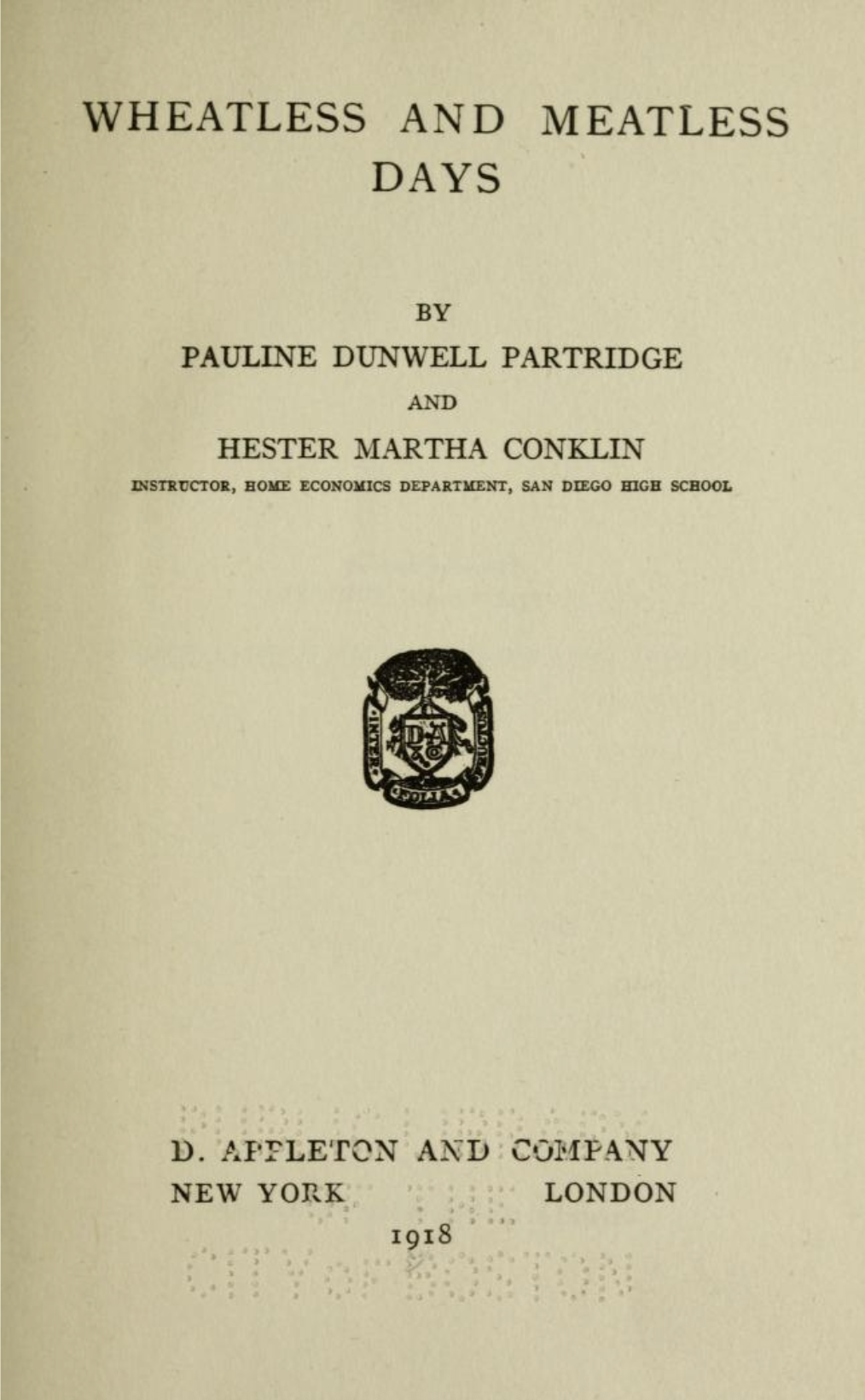
- Title page of Wheatless and Meatless Days (1918)
- Born: Pauline Groat Dunwell; February 27, 1879 Lyons, New York, U.S.
- Died: June 13, 1944 (aged 65) San Francisco, California, U.S.
- Resting place: Elmwood Cemetery, Lyons, New York
- Occupation: Short story writer; magazine writer; cookbook writer; poet
- Language: English
- Education: DeLancey School; Wells College
- Notable works: Wheatless and Meatless Days (1918)
- Spouse: Edward Bellamy Partridge (m. 1903; div. 1926)
- Relatives: Charles T. Dunwell (uncle)

Pauline Dunwell Partridge (born Pauline Groat Dunwell; February 27, 1879 – June 13, 1944) was an American writer. Her work included short stories, poetry, magazine articles, and cookbooks. She contributed to periodicals including Redbook, Good Housekeeping, and Woman's Home Companion, and often collaborated with the writer Hester Conklin. The two worked as home economics consultants and co-authored the World War I-era cookbook Wheatless and Meatless Days (1918). She was formerly married to the author Edward Bellamy Partridge.

== Biography ==
=== Early and personal life ===
Pauline Groat Dunwell was born on February 27, 1879, in Lyons, New York, to James W. Dunwell, a justice of the New York Supreme Court, and Ellen Groat Dunwell. Her uncle was Charles T. Dunwell.

She attended the DeLancey School in Geneva, New York, and later graduated from Wells College.

On October 13, 1903, she married the attorney Edward Bellamy Partridge at her parents' home in Lyons. The couple settled in Phelps, New York. She later lived in San Diego. Her husband later authored several novels. They divorced in 1926.

=== Career ===
Partridge's work appeared in periodicals including Redbook, McCall's, Good Housekeeping, The American Magazine, Pictorial Review, and Woman's Home Companion. She also collaborated with Hester Conklin on food and lifestyle articles. In addition to fiction and nonfiction, she contributed poetry to publications including Munsey's Magazine, Woman's Home Companion, and Poetry: A Magazine of Verse.

Partridge and Conklin were affiliated with the Del Monte Cookery Service and served as consultants in home economics. During World War I, they were connected with the U.S. Food Administration and co-authored the cookbook Wheatless and Meatless Days. The book was dedicated to the nation's soldiers and sailors and promoted food conservation and waste reduction as part of the wartime effort. It was divided into wheatless recipes and meatless dishes, including meat substitutes. They also wrote and lectured on household topics.

=== Death ===
In March 1944, Partridge was reported to be seriously ill. She died on June 13, 1944, at Stanford Hospital in San Francisco. She was cremated, and her remains were interred in the family lot at Elmwood Cemetery in Lyons, New York.

== Publications ==
- Wheatless and Meatless Days (with Hester Conklin; New York and London: D. Appleton & Company, 1918)
- Del Monte Conservation Recipes of Flavor (with Hester Conklin; San Francisco: California Packing Corporation, 1918)
- Del Monte Tomato Sauce Recipes (with Hester Conklin; San Francisco: California Packing Corporation, 1919)
