= Anne Lindbergh =

American writer (1940–1993)

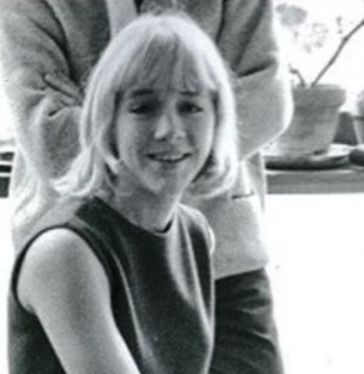
- Lindbergh c. 1960s
- Born: Anne Spencer Lindbergh; October 2, 1940; Manhattan, New York, US
- Died: December 10, 1993 (aged 53); Thetford Center, Vermont, US
- Burial place: Mt. Pleasant Crematory
- Occupation: writer
- Spouse: Noel Perrin (m. 1988)
- Children: 2
- Parents: Charles Lindbergh; Anne Morrow Lindbergh
- Relatives: Reeve Lindbergh (sister); Jon Lindbergh (brother)

Anne Spencer Lindbergh (October 2, 1940 – December 10, 1993) was an American writer, primarily of children's novels. She was a daughter of aviators/authors Charles Lindbergh and Anne Morrow Lindbergh.

== Biography ==
Anne Lindbergh was raised in Darien, Connecticut. After studying at Radcliffe College for three years, she moved to Paris to continue her education, studying at the Sorbonne. She met and married a fellow student there, Julien Feydy, who later became a political scientist and university professor. They had two children: a daughter Constance Feydy and a son Marek Sapieyevski. They later divorced.

She later married Jerzy Sapieyevski, a composer and conductor she met in Europe and with whom she moved to Washington. They also divorced. She was married to Noel Perrin, American essayist and a professor at Dartmouth College, at the time of her death. They lived together in Thetford Center, Vermont.

Anne Lindbergh wrote numerous books, most of them for children.

Anne Lindbergh died of cancer in 1993 at her home in Thetford Center, Vermont, at the age of 53.

== Personal life ==
Anne Lindbergh's eldest brother, Charles Augustus Lindbergh Jr., the first of six children born to Charles and Anne Lindbergh, died in the 1932 Lindbergh kidnapping — what many termed at the time "the crime of the century". Anne's other Lindbergh siblings are aquanaut Jon Lindbergh (1932–2021), Land Morrow Lindbergh (born 1937), conservationist Scott Lindbergh (born 1942), and Reeve Lindbergh (born 1945).

== Honors, awards, distinctions ==
Anne Lindbergh was the recipient of numerous honors for her work, including an award from the International Reading Association.

== Books ==
This list includes all known titles at WorldCat.

- Osprey Island, illustrated by Maggie Kaufman Smith (1974), as by Anne Lindbergh Feydy,
- The People in Pineapple Place (1982)
- Nobody's Orphan (1983)
- Bailey's Window (1984)
- The Worry Week (1985)
- The Hunky-Dory Dairy (1986)
- Next Time, Take Care, illus. Susan Hoguet (1987), picture book
- The Shadow on the Dial (1987)
- The Prisoner of Pineapple Place (1988), sequel to The People
- Tidy Lady, illus. Susan Hoguet (1989), picture book
- Three Lives to Live (1992)
- Travel Far, Pay No Fare (1992)
- Nick of Time (1994), posthumous publication
- Local Vertical: Poems (2000)
- The Inside Story on Henry Alcebiades Highfllie (2004), stories privately printed by David R. Godine
