= Reeve Lindbergh =

American author (born 1945)

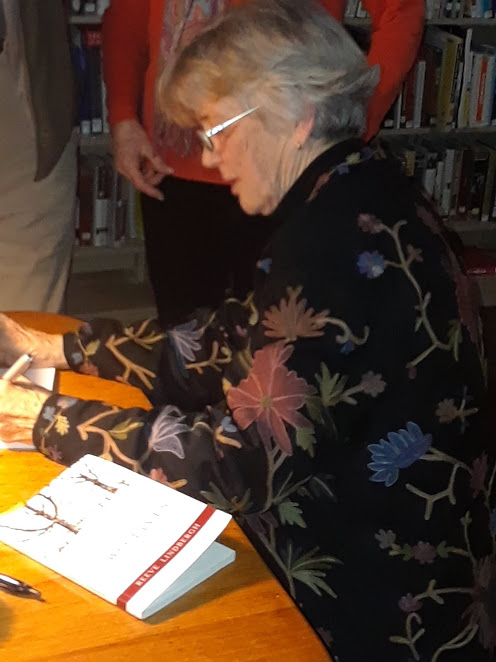
- Lindbergh signing Two Lives (April 11, 2018) at the St. Johnsbury Athenaeum
- Born: October 2, 1945 (age 81)
- Education: Radcliffe College
- Occupation: Writer
- Spouses: Richard Brown (div. 1987); Nathaniel W. Tripp (m. 1987)
- Children: 4
- Parent: Charles Lindbergh; Anne Morrow Lindbergh
- Writing career
- Language: English
- Years active: 1968–present
- Genre: Children's books
- Website: reevelindbergh.com

Reeve Morrow Lindbergh (born October 2, 1945) is an American author from Caledonia County, Vermont. Lindbergh grew up in Darien, Connecticut and was a daughter of aviator Charles Lindbergh and author Anne Morrow Lindbergh. She graduated from Radcliffe College in 1968.

Lindbergh writes of her experiences growing up in the household of her famous father – with echoes of his famous transatlantic flight and the kidnapping of her eldest brother, events which occurred years before she was born. In Two Lives (Brigantine Media; 2018), Lindbergh reflects on how she navigates her role as the public face of arguably "the most famous family of the twentieth century," while leading a "very quiet existence in rural Vermont."

== Biography ==
Reeve Lindbergh's parents, Charles and Anne Morrow Lindbergh, were considered a "golden couple". Her father's famous solo, non-stop transatlantic flight from New York to Paris in 1927 occurred 18 years before she was born. Hailed as a hero, Charles went on to marry the daughter of wealthy businessman Dwight Morrow, then serving as the U.S. Ambassador to Mexico.

In 1932, the Lindbergh's firstborn, Charles Lindbergh Jr., was kidnapped from their home in Hopewell, New Jersey—and killed—13 years before Reeve was born. Reeve's parents never discussed the kidnapping with their children. As she relates, "As the youngest, it's been easiest for me. My brothers and older sister grew up under the shadow of the kidnapping and the war years."

In The Names of the Mountains Lindbergh reveals what life as a Lindbergh was like after the death of her father through a fictional family. Under a Wing: A Memoir recounts Lindbergh's life as a child growing up in Darien, Connecticut with her "loving but stern father”. Charles did not allow his children to drink soda or eat candy, and he favored family discussion over watching television. He directed his family with a set of hard-and-fast rules. "There were only two ways of doing things—Father's way and the wrong way," Lindbergh notes in her book.

=== Fame and controversy ===
The build-up to World War II brought more controversy to the Lindbergh household. Charles Lindbergh was an outspoken isolationist and critic of U.S. military involvement against Nazi Germany. Putting her father's views in perspective, Reeve states,

Even though my father's views were controversial, he represented a lot of the thinking of the day. Isolationism was characteristic among many Americans at that time, otherwise President Roosevelt wouldn't have had such a tough time swaying public opinion.

Due to the fame and controversy surrounding the Lindberghs, the family grew up outside the public eye in Darien, Connecticut. As Reeve explains it, "My parents represented this country in an extraordinary way and people identified with them in a very personal way." Lindbergh remembers her family leaving restaurants during a meal if her father was recognized. As she recounts:

[...] if we went out for dinner and a waiter or somebody at the restaurant wanted my father's autograph, he would make us all get up and leave. I was furious. I thought why does he care; it's just an autograph. But I had no way of relating to what they had been through.

Later she would realize her parents were trying to protect for their children what had been taken from them. As she explains in Two Lives:

Having been robbed of normalcy in a terrible way early on, they understood it for the treasure that it is, and tried their best to offer this treasure to their children as we grew up. How little I appreciated their efforts.

Lindbergh has been spared much of the intrusion of fame in her personal life. "If I'm introduced to somebody, often people will say, "Any relation?" she says. But, as she's "not recognized in person at all," she enjoys "a kind of freedom that (her) parents did not have."

Other aspects of the family fame do get to her. Of her grandmother's dress being placed at the museum in Washington, D.C., with the "Spirit of St. Louis" and the "Tingmissartoq", the airplane her parents used to scout out commercial airline routes in the Thirties, Lindbergh says in her latest book:

What on earth is it doing in the National Air and Space Museum? Shouldn't it be in a chest in a family attic, with other attic things?

As Charles and Anne Lindbergh's youngest child, Reeve has written often of her upbringing in the famous household. In her first memoir, Under a Wing: A Memoir (Simon and Schuster; 1998), she tells of how her father's reluctance to share too much about himself caused her disquiet. As a child she watched Jimmy Stewart re-create her father's historic flight, asking innocently, "Does he make it?" In No More Words: A Journal of My Mother, Anne Morrow Lindbergh (Simon and Schuster; 2001) she records the last months of her mother, who had written the bestseller Gift from the Sea and later lost her ability to speak due to a series of strokes. Forward From Here: Leaving Middle Age—and Other Unexpected Adventures (Simon and Schuster; 2008) tells of the discovery later in life that her father had affairs with three German women resulting in the addition of seven half siblings to the Lindbergh family.

When the phone in Passumpsic rang off the hook after news of her father's affairs hit, Lindbergh stated, "The Lindbergh family is treating this situation as a private matter, and has taken steps to open personal channels of communication, with sensitivity to all concerned." For her, this was another way of saying, "We don't know any more than you do, but we're trying to figure this out while causing as little pain as possible." As difficult as it has been being a part of her famous family, Lindbergh has come to realize, "You have to lead a real life in the midst of however strange the circumstances might be."

=== Vermont ===
Lindbergh and her first husband, Richard Brown, moved from Cambridge, Massachusetts to Vermont, where they both taught school and had three children. In 1983 she published her autobiographical novel Moving to the Country, which Publishers Weekly called "comforting, hopeful, sensitively written, an honest and believable portrayal of marriage, change, and putting down roots."

=== Tragedy ===
Their son, Jonathan, died of a seizure at twenty months in 1985. Lindbergh's mother, Anne Morrow Lindbergh, who had been visiting at the time of Jonathan's death, told her daughter, that "the most important thing to do now was to go and sit in the room with the baby." Her mother added, "I never saw my child's body. I never sat with my son this way."

After the death of their child, the marriage "fell apart". To overcome her grief, Reeve took up writing children's books, saying later: "I would be lost without writing."

=== Farming ===
Lindbergh and her second husband live in a 19th-century farmhouse in Passumpsic, Vermont, where they raise chickens and sheep.

== Children's books ==
Reeve began writing children's books the day Jon died as an infant in 1985. She told the Philadelphia City Paper, "I was waiting for my family to come and meet me and I just sat there and started to write this little lullaby for Johnny."

‘'The Midnight Farm, Lindbergh's first published children's book, "will comfort any child afraid of the dark," said Eve Bunting in the Los Angeles Times Book Review. Lindbergh continued the animal theme in Benjamin's Barn about a young boy who discovers jungle and prehistoric creatures, pirate ships, and a princess in a big, red barn.

Lindbergh turned to an American folk hero in Johnny Appleseed: A Poem, retelling how John Chapman traveled from the East Coast to the Midwest, planting apple seeds for future generations.

An accomplished poet, Lindbergh uses rhyming couplets to describe how spring comes on in New England in North Country Spring. "Lindbergh's ebullient verse is a triumph song of spring's melting, sensory flush," wrote Publishers Weekly.

== Personal life ==
Reeve Lindbergh married her second husband, writer Nathaniel Wardwell Tripp (born 1944), on February 11, 1987, in Barnet, Vermont—the same day she divorced her first husband, Richard Brown. She and Tripp have a son. They also have two "gregarious and rambunctious dogs," Labrador Retrievers named Buster and Lola.

The Elisabeth Morrow School in Englewood, New Jersey, was founded by her aunt in 1931. Nearby Dwight Morrow High School, founded in 1932, was named for her grandfather, a businessman who famously served as U.S. ambassador to Mexico under Calvin Coolidge (1927–30).

Reeve's eldest brother, Charles Augustus Lindbergh Jr., the first of six children born to Charles and Anne Lindbergh, died in 1932 in a famous kidnapping — what many termed at the time "the crime of the century". Reeve's other Lindbergh siblings include aquanaut Jon Lindbergh (1932–2021), Land Morrow Lindbergh (born 1937), writer Anne Spencer Lindbergh (1940–1993), and conservationist Scott Lindbergh (born 1942), who raised rare monkeys in France. Reeve discovered later in life that her father had three other families in Germany and Switzerland.

Reeve's brother Land Morrow Lindbergh has been considered a possible model for the central character in French writer-aviator Antoine de Saint-Exupery's The Little Prince. The author visited the Lindbergh home in 1939, hoping to convince his fellow pilot, Charles Lindbergh, to urge Americans to enter the war against Nazi Germany. Unsuccessful in his primary objective, de Saint-Exupery became captivated by "Charles's golden-haired boy," Land Lindbergh. As a 76-year-old Montana rancher in 2014, the possible basis for this classic story could not be reached for comment.

== Honors, awards, distinctions ==
Lindbergh won the Redbook magazine award in 1987 for "The Midnight Farm" and in 1990 for "Benjamin's Barn". She serves as a board member (1977–) and honorary chairman (2004–) of the Charles A. and Anne Morrow Lindbergh Foundation. She previously served as vice president (1986–1995) and president (1995–2004) of the foundation. Lindbergh served as Chair of the Vermont Arts Council Board of Trustees Awards Committee from 2015 until she stepped down as trustee in the summer of 2021.

== Readings ==
Lindbergh presented a live reading of her children's book, Nobody Owns the Sky, about Bessie Coleman, an early aviation pioneer, at the Smithsonian National Air and Space Museum in Washington, D.C., in December 2021. She again performed a live reading of the same book there on November 10, 2026 (in the Steven F. Udvar-Hazy Center).

== Written works ==
- Moving to the Country (novel), Doubleday (New York, NY), 1983.
- The View from the Kingdom: A New England Album (essays), photographs by Richard Brown, introduction by Noel Perrin, Harcourt Brace Jovanovich (San Diego, CA), 1987.
- The Names of the Mountains (novel), Simon and Schuster (New York, NY), 1992.
- John's Apples (poems), illustrated by John Wilde, Perishable Press (Mt. Horeb, WI), 1995.
- Under a Wing (memoir), Simon and Schuster (New York, NY), 1998.
- No More Words: A Journal of My Mother, Anne Morrow Lindbergh, Simon and Schuster (New York, NY), 2001.
- Forward From Here: Leaving Middle Age—and Other Unexpected Adventures, Simon and Schuster (New York, NY), 2008.
- Two Lives, Brigantine Media (St. Johnsbury, VT), 2018.

=== Children's books ===
- The Midnight Farm, illustrated by Susan Jeffers, Dial (New York, NY), 1987.
- Benjamin's Barn, illustrated by Susan Jeffers, Dial (New York, NY), 1990.
- The Day the Goose Got Loose, illustrated by Steven Kellogg, Dial (New York, NY), 1990.
- Johnny Appleseed: A Poem, illustrated by Kathy Jakobsen, Joy Street (Boston, MA), 1990.
- A View from the Air: Charles Lindbergh's Earth and Sky, photographs by Richard Brown, Viking (New York, NY), 1992.
- Grandfather's Lovesong, illustrated by Rachel Isadora, Viking (New York, NY), 1993.
- There's a Cow in the Road!, illustrated by Tracey Campbell Pearson, Dial (New York, NY), 1993.
- If I'd Known Then What I Know Now, illustrated by Kimberly Bulcken Root, Viking (New York, NY), 1994.
- What Is the Sun?, illustrated by Stephen Lambert, Candlewick (Cambridge, MA), 1994.
- Nobody Owns the Sky: The Story of "Brave Bessie" Coleman, illustrated by Pamela Paparone, Candlewick (Cambridge, MA), 1996.
- The Awful Aardvarks Go to School, illustrated by Tracey Campbell Pearson, Viking (New York, NY), 1997.
- The Circle of Days', illustrated by Cathie Felstead, Candlewick (Cambridge, MA), 1997.
- North Country Spring, illustrated by Liz Sivertson, Houghton Mifflin (Boston, MA), 1997.
- In Every Tiny Grain of Sand: A Child's Book of Prayers and Praise, illustrated by Christine Davenier, Candlewick (Cambridge, MA), 2000. (Compiler)
- The Awful Aardvarks Shop for School, illustrated by Tracey Campbell Pearson, Viking (New York, NY), 2000.
- On Morning Wings (adapted from Psalm 139), illustrated by Holly Meade, Candlewick Press (Cambridge, MA), 2002. (Adapter)
- My Hippie Grandmother, illustrated by Abby Carter, Candlewick Press (Cambridge, MA), 2003.
- Our Nest, illustrated by Jill McElmurry, Candlewick (Cambridge, MA), 2004.
- The Visit, illustrated by Wendy Halperin, Dial (New York, NY), 2004.

== Video ==
- Johnny Appleseed was adapted as a videotape, Weston Woods/Scholastic, 2000.
