= Bellamy Partridge =

American writer (1877–1960)

Edward Bellamy Partridge (July 10, 1877 – July 3, 1960), who also wrote under the name Bellamy Partridge, Thomas Bailey, and Bailey, was an American writer known for his books about turn-of-the-century life in the United States. He also wrote in 1952 “Fill’er Up! The Story of Fifty Years of Motoring”. Much is first hand experience and personal interviews. Delightful. Other books by “Sube Cane”, “Cousins”, “Amundsen: The Splendid Norseman”, “A Pretty Pickle”, “Pure and Simple”, “Sir Billy Howe: Life of the Gay Revolutionary General”, “Long Night”, “Horse and Buggy”, “The Roosevelt Family in America”, “An Imperial Saga”, “Get a Horse”, “Thunder Shower”, “January Thaw”, “Excuse My Dust”, “Big Freeze”, and “The Old Oaken Bucket”. With Dr. Otto Bettmann “As We Were”.

== Early and personal life ==
He grew up as the son of the lawyer Samuel Seldon Partridge in Phelps, New York. He married Pauline Groat Dunwell in 1903; they divorced in 1926. After a typhoid infection forced him to abandon his law studies, he worked as a real estate salesman and in various other jobs in California, before turning to journalism. He wrote for Sunset magazine and as a newspaper war correspondent from Europe in World War I. After the war, he entered the publishing business, writing book reviews and working as an editor for the Arcadia publishing house.

== Career ==
In his sixties, he had already published 13 books of his own, but to little success. That came with Country Lawyer (1939), a bestselling biography of his father, which Partridge said was based on his father's old case files. The New York Times described it as "an affectionate glance at a seemingly vanished world of parlors and front porches, stereopticon slides and hay-filled barns", and The Atlantic as "an unpretentious, highly anecdotal, and entertaining account of village life".

Partridge's later successful books continued in Country Lawyer's nostalgic vein. They included Big Family (1941) about his father's family, Excuse My Dust (1943, adapted for the screen 1951) about early automobiles, As We Were (1946) about late-19th-century family life, Salad Days (1951) about Partridge's studies, and several other works, including a biography of explorer Roald Amundsen (1953). He also wrote three novels and a history of the Roosevelt family.

== Death ==
Partridge died on July 3, 1960, in Bridgeport, Connecticut. He left behind his wife, Helen Mary Davis Partridge, and their son and daughter.
