= Pierre van Paassen =

American journalist and minister (1895–1968)

Pierre van Paassen (February 7, 1895 – January 8, 1968) was a Dutch-Canadian-American journalist, writer, and Unitarian minister. He was born in Gorinchem, Netherlands, then emigrated with his parents to Canada in 1914. After entering a seminary, he served as a missionary to Ruthenian immigrants in the Alberta hinterland, where he helped with medical work. In 1917 he left theological school to serve with the Canadian army in France in World War I as an infantryman and sapper.

In 1921 he became a journalist with the Toronto Globe, and a year later moved to the U.S. and began writing a syndicated column for The Atlanta Journal-Constitution. From 1924 to 1931, Van Paassen worked as a foreign correspondent and columnist for the New York Evening World, based in Paris. After the World folded, he became a foreign correspondent for the Toronto Star.

Van Paassen spoke Dutch, French, English, and some Ruthenian (which allowed him to converse passably with many Russians), and later learned Hebrew.

He gained fame reporting on the conflicts among Arabs, British, Jews and French in the Middle East, as well as on the ongoing African slave trade and colonial problems in North Africa and the Horn of Africa. He reported on Benito Mussolini's Italo-Ethiopian War, the Spanish Civil War and other European and colonial conflicts.

== Journalistic career ==
In addition to his popular storytelling in the frequently ephemeral human interest stories that the papers principally hired him to write, van Paassen's many other personal accounts from the field brought home to American readers the often harsh results of European internal turmoil and of the foreign adventures of the interwar European colonial powers.

From his earliest travels to Palestine in 1925, he saw and developed a regard for the work of the early Jewish immigrants to improve the area's agriculture and industry. Later he became one of the first non-Jews in America to write favorably about the campaign to establish a Jewish national home in Palestine, and remained a Zionist supporter afterwards. But fundamentally, Van Paassen was a Christian Democratic Socialist concerned, as he put it in his autobiographical Days of Our Years, with the enduring struggle for justice for ordinary individuals. He was a staunch opponent of fascism in Italy, Germany and France from the 1920s, reinforced by the ten days he spent as a prisoner in some unidentified camp in late March 1933. In an interview, van Paassen denied being detained at Dachau Concentration Camp but could not otherwise name the camp. His activities as a correspondent brought "expulsion from France by Pierre Laval, from Germany by Joseph Goebbels and from Eritrea by Count Ciano."

In 1933 Van Paassen traveled incognito to the Dome of the Rock, a famous Islamic shrine in Jerusalem. He was accompanied by a British Intelligence officer, and both smeared their faces and hands with burnt cork to give them an Arab appearance. They also wore long white garments to give them a "Hadjihs" appearance. Their evasiveness was a necessity, for nonbelievers were (and still are) not allowed in areas that are considered to be the holiest places in the world of Islam. The purpose of their venture was to get an inside look at the radical movement by listening to what the Mullahs were preaching in regards to the political turmoil that was taking place in then British controlled Palestine. Three years later The Great Uprising took form. This redoubled political violence was in part planned by the Grand Mufti of Jerusalem, Mohammad Amin al-Husayni, whom Van Paassen had interviewed in 1929 about his incitement of the bloody uprising that year against the Jews in Palestine.

=== Autobiographies ===
Van Paassen's autobiography, Days of Our Years, published in 1939, detailed many events that he could not mention in his earlier newspaper reports. It was the bestselling nonfiction book in the United States for almost two years. "Since I could not afford to be excluded from a single European country with so general an assignment, it was in my interest to remain on the good side of all the nascent censorships in Europe. Hence many things I investigated or saw remained unreported. For example, in 1928... [about] the methods of the reactionary governments of Rumania and Bulgaria in suppressing popular movements - twelve thousand peasants and workers had been slain in Bulgaria alone that year - I could not send out a word. The police dogged our every footstep.... The managing editor, Mr. John H. Tennant, warned me more than once that I had not been sent over on a crusading mission. He added, moreover, that there was no confirmation from any reliable source on that horrible business in Bulgaria. The local agency correspondents had not sent a word. So I, too, remained silent. It was the only policy. Correspondents like George Seldes, Samuel Spivak, David Darrah Gedye, and myself discovered only too soon that if we did speak out, we did not last very long, either in the countries in which we were stationed or in our jobs."

Van Paassen became a US citizen in 1947.

In his 1964 book To Number Our Days, Van Paassen wrote more about many of the same subjects he covered in Days of Our Years, especially the maneuvers of pre-World War II Europe's empires. The book only slightly extends Van Paassen's account after the US entering the war, but includes much about his pre-war life as a roving correspondent. Van Paassen's views of the potential of the Soviet Union appear to have changed between 1939 and 1941, and he writes less about Russia and less optimistically about it than in his writings of the 1920s and 1930s.

In his books, Van Paassen was not a rigorous historian but used vivid accounts often taken from first-hand encounters with participants in the conflicts about which he wrote. During the 1929 Palestine uprising, after his reporting on the massacres contradicted both the Mufti's statements and local British officials' news releases, he became the target of several assassination attempts, after the last of which a Captain Saunders pointedly asked, "Moreover, why do these things happen to you? I have received no complaints from your colleagues of the press in Jerusalem." Subsequently, he became persona non grata at Government House, but insisted that "I believe my offense was that I took nothing for granted.... I questioned everybody..."

== Quotations ==
In 1938, before the Munich Accord, Van Paassen wrote of the Western European powers' strategic assessments of Germany's likely drive for expansion in Eastern Europe and Russia, and the potential shock to the European economy if the West were to make war and destroy Germany.

On the other hand, against the evil of Germany's collapse stood the alternative of giving Adolf Hitler, under a Four-Power accord, carte blanche to break out of his dangerous isolation by clearing himself a road through Czechoslovakia to the oil and wheat fields of Rumania, thus putting him in possession of the wherewithal to risk a war of long duration with the Soviet Union. For it is Russia, which Herr Hitler, by a stroke of the pen, has relegated to Asia, that is to provide Germany with the markets and colonies she lacks at present. In this way Germany's pressure on the Western imperialisms will be lessened, and at the same time the intolerable burden of carrying the Reich's colossal war machine will be shifted, at least partially, from the shoulders of the German people to those of the prospective colonial tribes in the Muscovite plain.

To prevent an interimperialist European war by coming to an understanding with Nazi ambition for expansion in Eastern Europe has been the fundamental directive of England's foreign policy under Baldwin and Chamberlain. Having her eyes on the Far East, where Japan has arisen as the next historical challenger of British naval and colonial power, Britain desires above all else to have her hands free for the struggle she must wage in the Pacific. For, as England in the past has successively destroyed the naval power of Spain, Holland, Louis XIV, Napoleonic France and Imperial Germany, she must sooner or later envisage checking Japan before her spheres of influence in China and her Indian, Malay, and Australian possessions are threatened by that new and determined rival.

England will fight, therefore, not for democracy and not in Europe if she can at all prevent it, but to safeguard her imperial interests where they are at stake... in the East.

...It could therefore be predicted with reasonable certainty after the smoothly effected annexation of Austria that Czechoslovakia would be the next link in the chain encircling Germany to be sacrificed, and, thereafter, that Poland, Hungary, Rumania and Yugoslavia are to be similarly abandoned when Hitler judges the time opportune to take another step in easterly direction.

Earlier, Germany's January 1936 commercial contracts for the output of the Spanish and Spanish Moroccan mines had gone awry with the opposition of a newly-elected government in Madrid. "Even so, the need for raw materials was pressing. Germany's war stocks were of the scantiest. Rather than forgo the unlimited supply that the mines of Iberia and the Riff offered, Hitler summoned General Sanjurjo from Lisbon (where he was living in banishment) to Berlin in March 1936, and the plot for a military insurrection against the Republic with the aid of the Fuehrer and Signor Mussolini was hatched." After Sanjurjo's death his lieutenant, General Franco, duly launched the planned war from Morocco.

However, French Prime Minister Léon Blum said that "every time we make a move to help the Spanish Republic, we are warned by Downing Street that if we become involved in war with Italy and Germany over Spain, France cannot count on British support."

Van Paassen was convinced that the British Empire's farsighted military planners and political leaders were not entirely displeased to see France's position weakened by Germany at that time, as it improved Britain's relative dominance over its ancient rival, France, in Britain's drive for worldwide hegemony.

By his intervention in Spain, Herr Hitler, moreover, rendered Britain the immense service of laying an ax to the French military hegemony in Europe (which had been a thorn in Britain's side ever since Versailles). By the creation of a third hostile frontier, he made the Quai d'Orsay so absolutely dependent on England that France lost her freedom of action entirely and was reduced to the status of a second-rate power....

In December 1936, Germany had the satisfaction of receiving the first shipments of iron ore from Spanish Morocco and a year later had not only the mines of the Asturias under her control, but had ordered Franco, in exchange for artillery tanks, Junker planes and ammunition, to have one million tons of ore, antimony, tin, copper and lignite in German ports by the end of 1939.

In reality, the civil war in Spain strengthened Hitler so enormously that in the perspective of history that dolorous episode may well come to be known as the starting point of the Nazi mastery of Europe.

In his 1939 book Days of Our Years Van Paassen wrote:

Germany is much farther on the road to dechristianization than the Soviet Union, even if the churches in the Reich remain open and the incense still rises from the altars. In the place of God has come the would be almighty state which, insatiable as the Moloch of old, demands man’s entire devotion, mentally and physically.

In 1941, Van Paassen wrote:

To many observers, amongst them a number of statesmen, the civil war in Spain at one time appeared to be nothing more significant than a bloody dispute between adherents of two equally obnoxious ideologies, Fascism and Communism. Whichever of the two contending parties came out victorious seemed, therefore, a matter of supreme indifference. Only in 1941 did it become clear that Franco's early victories in 1937 had laid the ground for Hitler's final blow to Great Britain's Mediterranean position in 1941.

At the same time, he wrote, "The assumption that the Battle of the Atlantic is the pivot upon which world history turns is false. Britain as an empire stands or falls with the control of the Near East."

In To Number Our Days (published in 1964), after viewing the plight of blacks in Atlanta and after discussing President Franklin Roosevelt sympathetically as introducing "creeping socialism" (in the context as that term was understood in 1964), he notes that he made a prediction sealed in a vault at Oglethorpe University in 1942: "My prediction ran this way:... In AD 2042 when Oglethorpe's vault is opened, there will be a socialist president in Washington. He will be a Negro!" (p. 248).

== Books ==
- Nazism: An Assault on Civilization (1934; co-editor and contributor)
- Days of our Years (1939; autobiography)
- Afraid of Victory (c. 1939-41)
- The Battle for Jerusalem (1941; co-author with Vladimir Jabotinsky, John Henry Patterson, Josiah Wedgwood IV)
- The Time is Now! (1941)
- That Day Alone (1941)
- The Forgotten Ally (1943)
- Earth Could Be Fair (1946)
- The Tower of Terzel (1948; novel)
- Palestine: Land of Israel (1948)
- Why Jesus Died (1949)
- Jerusalem Calling! (1950)
- Visions Rise and Change (1955)
- A Pilgrim's Vow (1956)
- A Crown of Fire: The Life and Times of Girolamo Savonarola (1960)
- To Number Our Days (1964)
