= Gift from the Sea =

1955 book by Anne Morrow Lindbergh

- First edition
- Author: Anne Morrow Lindbergh
- Language: English
- Publisher: Pantheon Books
- Publication date: 1955
- Publication place: United States
- Pages: 127

Gift from the Sea is a book by Anne Morrow Lindbergh first published in 1955.

While on vacation on Florida's Captiva Island in the early 1950s, Lindbergh wrote the essay-style work by taking shells on the beach for inspiration and reflecting on the lives of Americans, particularly American women, in the mid-20th century. She shares her meditations on youth and age, love and marriage, peace, solitude, and contentment during her visit.

== Themes ==
Sometimes classified as inspirational literature, the book presages many of the themes in that genre of popular literature: simplicity, solitude, and caring for the soul.

== Reception ==
Gift from the Sea has sold over 3 million copies and has been translated into 45 languages. According to Publishers Weekly, the book was the top nonfiction bestseller in the United States for 1955.

== Cultural impact and legacy ==
Gift from the Sea has been widely recognized as an early work in the idea of mindfulness and modern feminist thought. Lindbergh brought to attention the societal pressures on women, and the domestic fatigue experienced by mid-century wives.

The book has remained continuously in print since its 1955 debut, selling over 3 million copies and being translated into dozens of languages. It has been reissued in several special commemorative editions, including a 50th-anniversary edition in 2005 with an introduction by her daughter, Reeve Lindbergh who calls it

"a timeless blueprint for women seeking to balance the demands of family, work, and inner peace."
