= North to the Orient =

1935 book by Anne Morrow Lindbergh

- Author: Anne Morrow Lindbergh
- Language: English
- Publisher: Harcourt, Brace and Co.
- Publication date: 1935
- Publication place: United States
- Pages: 255

North to the Orient is a 1935 book by the American writer Anne Morrow Lindbergh. It is the account of the 1931 flight by her and her husband, Charles Lindbergh, from the United States to Japan and China, by the northern route over the Arctic frontier of Canada and Alaska, and Kamchatka peninsula. It also documented their volunteering flights as relief efforts for the infamous Central China flood of 1931.

Lindbergh submitted the manuscript to Harcourt Brace in April 1935. By the following evening, she learned that it had been accepted for publication. The book was praised by critics and became a bestseller.

The first edition of 25,000 copies sold out within days, and the book was on its third printing by the end of the first week. It received the inaugural National Book Award for Nonfiction.

== See also ==
- Tingmissartoq, the plane the Lindberghs flew on the trip
