= Crime of the Century (1996 film) =

- Genre: Crime drama
- Based on: The Airman and the Carpenter by Ludovic Kennedy
- Teleplay by: William Nicholson
- Directed by: Mark Rydell
- Starring: Stephen Rea; Isabella Rossellini; J. T. Walsh; Michael Moriarty; Bert Remsen; Scott N. Stevens
- Music by: John Frizzell
- Country of origin: United States
- Original language: English

Production
- Executive producers: Barbara Broccoli; Amanda Schiff
- Producer: Mike Moder
- Cinematography: Toyomichi Kurita
- Editor: Antony Gibbs
- Running time: 114 minutes
- Production companies: Astoria Productions, Ltd.; HBO Pictures

Original release
- Network: HBO
- Release: September 14, 1996

Crime of the Century is a 1996 American crime drama television film directed by Mark Rydell. It presents a dramatization of the Lindbergh kidnapping of 1932. The film stars Stephen Rea as Bruno Hauptmann and Isabella Rossellini as his wife Anna.

== Plot ==
The film, like Ludovic Kennedy's 1985 book The Airman and the Carpenter upon which it is based, presents Bruno Richard Hauptmann as not guilty of the Lindbergh abduction and murder for which he was tried and executed. It suggests at least one of the perpetrators was Isidor Fisch, an associate of Hauptmann's who had conned several of the local German community out of money and who returned to Germany after the Lindbergh baby was found.

== Cast ==
- Stephen Rea as Bruno Hauptman
- Isabella Rossellini as Anna Hauptman
- J.T. Walsh as Colonel Norman Schwarzkopf Sr.
- Michael Moriarty as New Jersey Governor Harold Hoffman
- Allen Garfield as Lieutenant James Finn
- John Harkins as Edward Reilly
- Barry Primus as Ellis H. Parker
- David Paymer as David Wilentz
- Bert Remsen as Dr. John Condon
- Scott N. Stevens as Colonel Charles Lindbergh

== Awards ==
The film earned five Golden Globe nominations in the "Mini-Series or Motion Picture made for TV" categories. The film was nominated for the Outstanding Casting for a Miniseries or a Special, Outstanding Directing for a Miniseries or a Special, Outstanding Editing for a Miniseries or a Special - Single Camera Production and Outstanding Writing for a Miniseries or a Special at the 49th Primetime Emmy Awards.

== See also ==
- Presumption of guilt
