= Lindbergh kidnapping =

Abduction and murder of Charles Lindbergh Jr. (1932)

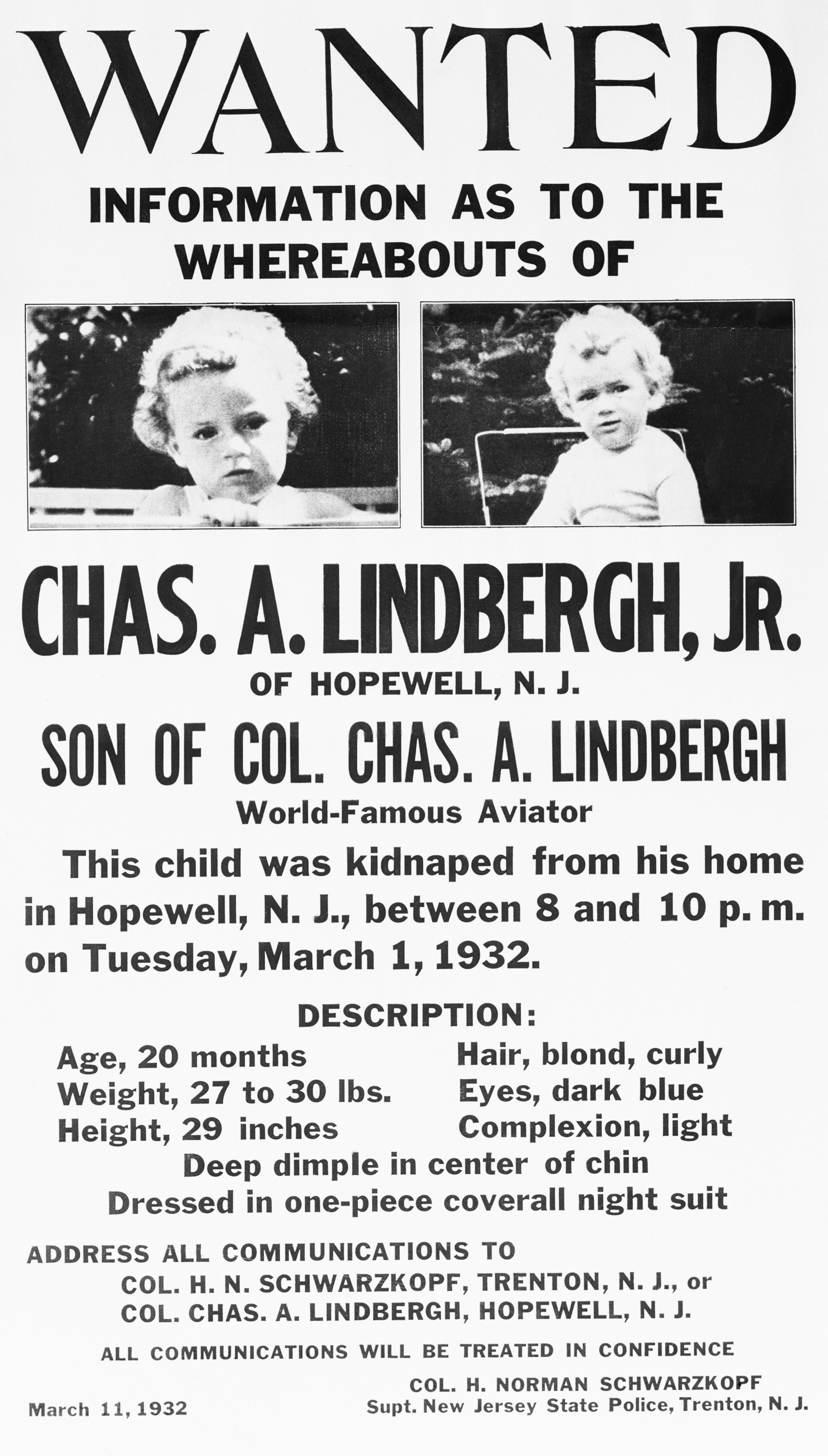
- Location: 40.4240°N 74.7677°W; East Amwell Township and Hopewell Township, New Jersey, U.S.
- Date: March 1, 1932; 94 years ago
- Attack type: Child murder by head trauma, child abduction
- Victims: Charles Augustus Lindbergh Jr., aged 1
- Motive: Inconclusive; possibly ransom
- Verdict: Guilty on all counts
- Convictions: First-degree murder; Kidnapping; Extortion
- Sentence: Death by electric chair
- Convicted: Bruno Richard Hauptmann

On March 1, 1932, Charles Augustus Lindbergh Jr. (born June 22, 1930), the 20-month-old son of Col. Charles Lindbergh and his wife, aviator and author Anne Morrow Lindbergh, was murdered after being abducted from his crib in the upper floor of the Lindberghs' home, Highfields, in East Amwell, New Jersey, United States. On May 12, the child's corpse was discovered by a truck driver by the side of a nearby road in adjacent Hopewell Township.

In September 1934, a German immigrant carpenter named Bruno Richard Hauptmann was arrested for the crime. After a trial that lasted from January 2 to February 13, 1935, he was found guilty of first-degree murder and sentenced to death. Despite his conviction, Hauptmann continued to profess his innocence, but all appeals failed and he was executed in the electric chair at the New Jersey State Prison on April 3, 1936. Hauptmann's guilt or lack thereof continues to be debated in the modern day. Newspaper writer H. L. Mencken called the kidnapping and trial "the biggest story since the Resurrection". American media called it the "crime of the century"; legal scholars have referred to the trial as one of the "trials of the century". The crime spurred the U.S. Congress to pass the Federal Kidnapping Act (commonly referred to as the "Little Lindbergh Law" at the time of its passage), which made transporting a kidnapping victim across state lines a federal crime.

== Kidnapping ==
At approximately 9:00 p.m. on March 1, 1932, the Lindberghs' nurse, Betty Gow, found that 20-month-old Charles Augustus Lindbergh Jr. was not with his mother, Anne Morrow Lindbergh, who had just come out of the bath. Gow then alerted Charles Lindbergh, who immediately went to the child's room, where he found a ransom note containing poor handwriting and grammar in an envelope on the windowsill. Taking a gun, Lindbergh went around the house and grounds with the family butler, Olly Whateley; they found impressions in the ground under the window of the baby's room, pieces of a wooden ladder, and a baby's blanket. Whateley telephoned the Hopewell police department while Lindbergh contacted his attorney and friend, Henry Breckinridge, and the New Jersey state police.

== Investigation ==
An extensive search of the home and its surrounding area was conducted by police from nearby Hopewell Borough in coordination with the New Jersey State Police.

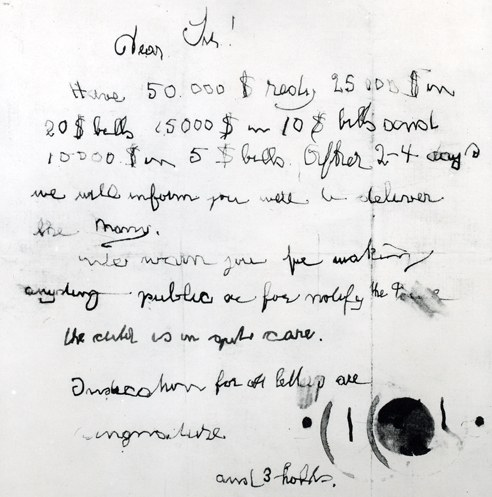
The ransom note

After midnight, a fingerprint expert examined the ransom note and ladder; no usable fingerprints or footprints were found, leading experts to conclude that the kidnapper(s) wore gloves and had some type of cloth on the soles of their shoes. No adult fingerprints were found in the baby's room, including in areas witnesses admitted to touching, such as the window, but the baby's fingerprints were found.

The brief, handwritten ransom note had many spelling and grammar irregularities:

Dear Sir! Have 50.000$ redy 25 000$ in 20$ bills 15000$ in 10$ bills and 10000$ in 5$ bills After 2–4 days we will inform you were to deliver the mony. We warn you for making anyding public or for notify the Police the child is in gut care. Indication for all letters are Singnature and 3 hohls.

At the bottom of the note were two interconnected blue circles surrounding a red circle, with a hole punched through the red circle and two more holes to the left and right.

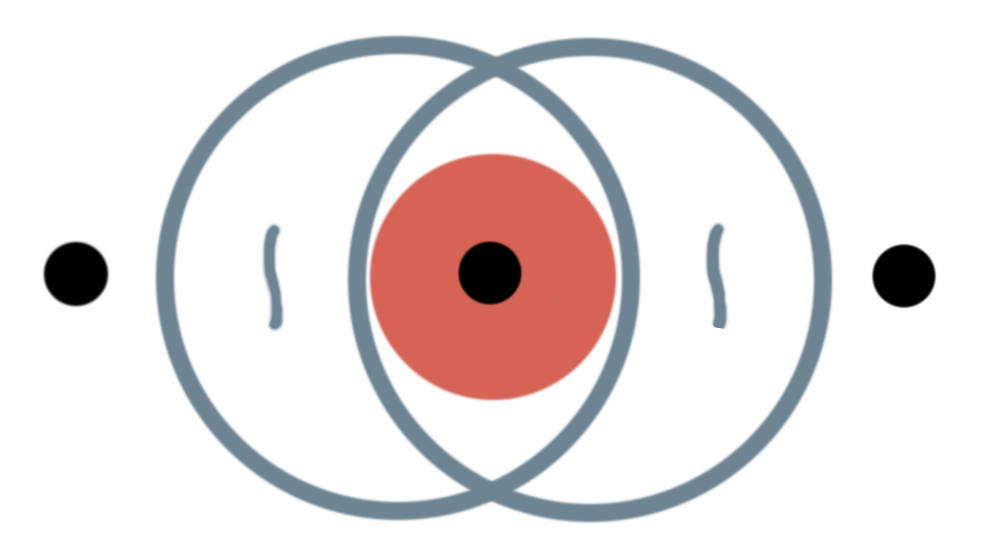
Re-creation of the ransom note's "signature", with black dots representing punctures in the paper

On further examination of the ransom note by professionals, they found that it was all written by the same person. They determined that due to the odd English, the writer must have been foreign and had spent little time in the United States. The FBI then found a sketch artist to make a portrait of the man that they believed to be the kidnapper.

Another attempt at identifying the kidnapper was made by examining the ladder that was used in the crime to abduct the child. Police realized that while the ladder was built incorrectly, it was built by someone who knew how to construct with wood and had prior building experience. No fingerprints were found on the ladder. Slivers of the wood were examined, as the police believed that this evidence would lead to the kidnapper. They had a professional see how many different types of wood were used, what pattern was made by the nail holes and if it had been made indoors or outdoors. This was later a key element in the trial of the man who was charged with the kidnapping.

On March 2, 1932, FBI Director J. Edgar Hoover contacted the Trenton, New Jersey Police Department. He told the New Jersey police that they could contact the FBI for any resources and the FBI would provide any assistance needed. Contemporary laws did not allow federal jurisdiction until May 13, 1932, when the President declared that the FBI was at the disposal of the New Jersey Police Department and that the FBI should coordinate and conduct the investigation.

The New Jersey State police offered a $25,000 reward, equivalent to $590,000 in 2025, for anyone who could provide information pertaining to the case.

On March 4, 1932, a man by the name of Gaston B. Means had a discussion with Evalyn Walsh McLean and told her that he would be of great importance in retrieving the Lindbergh baby. Means told McLean that he could find these kidnappers because he was approached weeks before the abduction about participating in a "big kidnapping" and he claimed that his friend was the kidnapper of the Lindbergh child. The following day, Means told McLean that he had made contact with the person who had the Lindbergh child. He then convinced Mrs. McLean to give him $100,000 to obtain the child because the ransom money had doubled. McLean obliged, believing that Means really knew where the child was. She waited for the child's return every day until she finally asked Means for her money back. When he refused, Mrs. McLean reported him to the police and he was sentenced to fifteen years in prison on embezzlement charges.

Violet Sharpe, (Note: In some sources, spelled as Violet Sharp) who was suspected as a conspirator, died by suicide on June 10, before she was scheduled to be questioned for the fourth time. Her involvement was later ruled out due to her having an alibi for the night of March 1, 1932.

In October 1933, Franklin D. Roosevelt announced that the Federal Bureau of Investigation would take jurisdiction over the case.

=== Prominence ===
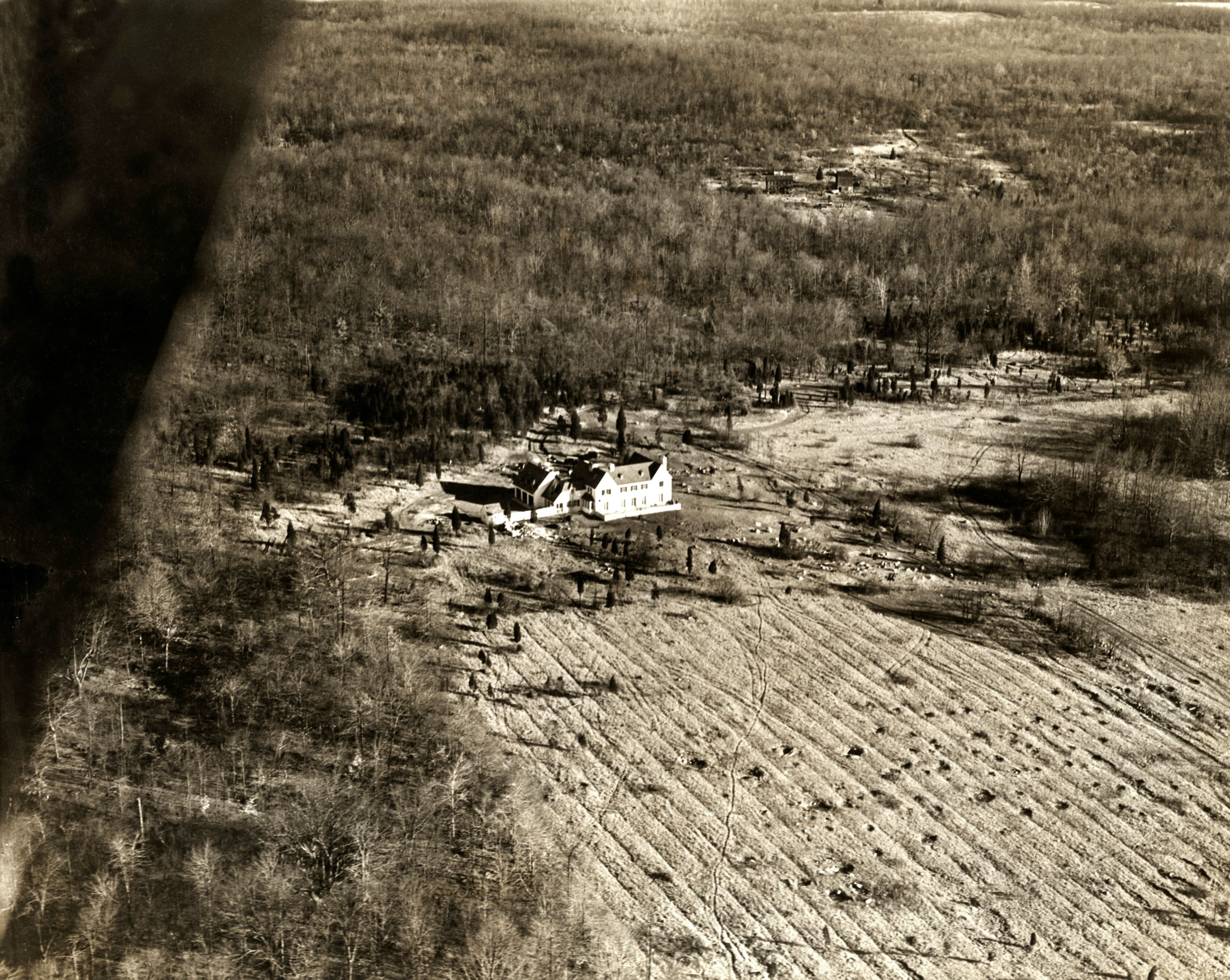
Aerial view of the Lindbergh estate in 1932

Word of the kidnapping spread quickly. Hundreds of people converged on the estate, destroying any footprint evidence. Along with police, well-connected and well-intentioned people arrived at the Lindbergh estate. Military colonels offered their aid, although only one had law enforcement expertise – Herbert Norman Schwarzkopf, superintendent of the New Jersey State Police. The other colonels were Henry Skillman Breckinridge, a Wall Street lawyer and the former United States Assistant Secretary of War; and William J. Donovan, a hero of the First World War who later headed the Office of Strategic Services (OSS), the forerunner of the CIA. Lindbergh and these men speculated that the kidnapping was perpetrated by organized crime figures. They thought that the letter was written by someone who spoke German as his native language. At this time, Charles Lindbergh used his influence to control the direction of the investigation.

They contacted Mickey Rosner, a Broadway hanger-on rumored to know mobsters. Rosner turned to two speakeasy owners, Salvatore "Salvy" Spitale and Irving Bitz, for aid. Lindbergh quickly endorsed the duo and appointed them his intermediaries to deal with the mob. Several organized crime figures – notably Al Capone, Willie Moretti, Joe Adonis, and Abner Zwillman – spoke from prison, offering to help return the baby in exchange for money or for legal favors. Specifically, Capone offered assistance in return for being released from prison under the pretense that his assistance would be more effective. This was quickly denied by the authorities.

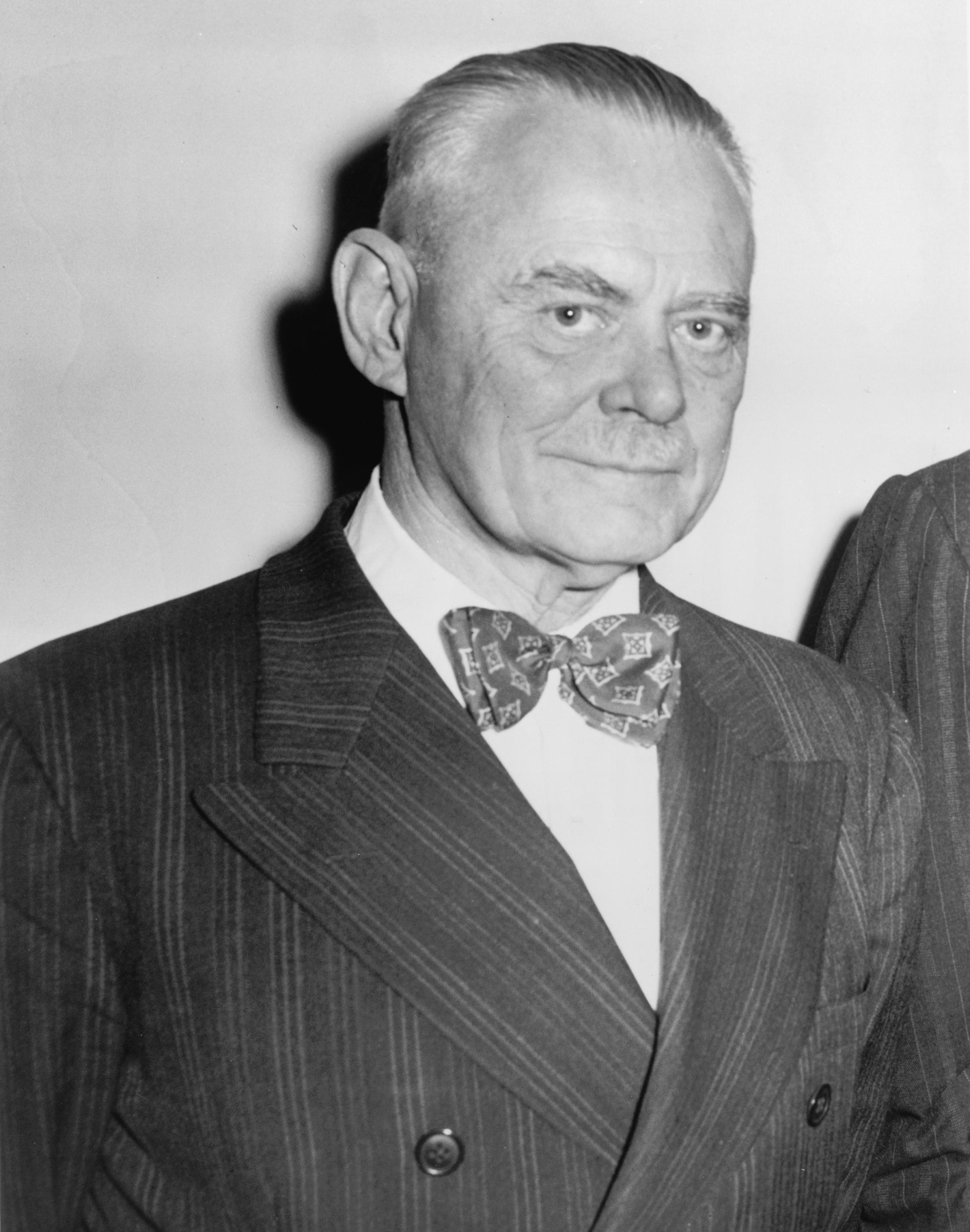
New Jersey State Police Superintendent Norman Schwarzkopf Sr.

The morning after the kidnapping, authorities notified President Herbert Hoover of the crime. At that time, kidnapping was classified as a state crime and the case did not seem to have any grounds for federal involvement. Nevertheless, Attorney General William D. Mitchell met with Hoover and announced that the whole machinery of the Department of Justice would be set in motion to cooperate with the New Jersey authorities. The Bureau of Investigation (BOI), forerunner of the FBI, was authorized to investigate the case, while the United States Coast Guard, the U.S. Customs Service, the U.S. Immigration Service and the Metropolitan Police Department of the District of Columbia were told their services might be required.

New Jersey officials announced a $25,000 reward for the safe return of "Little Lindy". The Lindbergh family offered an additional $50,000 reward of their own. At this time, the total reward of $75,000 (approximately $1,795,301 in 2026) was a tremendous sum of money, because the nation was in the midst of the Great Depression.

On March 6, a new ransom letter arrived by mail at the Lindbergh home. The letter was postmarked March 4 in Brooklyn, and it carried the perforated red and blue marks. The ransom had been raised to $70,000. A third ransom note postmarked from Brooklyn, and also including the secret marks, arrived in Breckinridge's mail. The note told the Lindberghs that John Condon should be the intermediary between the Lindberghs and the kidnapper(s), and requested notification in a newspaper that the third note had been received. Instructions specified the size of the box the money should come in, and warned the family not to contact the police.

=== John Condon ===
During this time, John F. Condon – a well-known Bronx personality and retired school teacher – wrote an open letter to The Bronx Home News, offering $1,000 if the kidnapper would turn the child over to a Catholic priest. Condon received a letter reportedly written by the kidnappers; it authorized Condon to be their intermediary with Lindbergh. Lindbergh accepted the letter as genuine.

Following the kidnapper's latest instructions, Condon placed a classified ad in the New York American reading: "Money is Ready. Jafsie." (Note: "Jafsie" was a pseudonym based on a phonetic pronunciation of Condon's initials, "J.F.C.") Condon then waited for further instructions from the culprits.

A meeting between "Jafsie" and a representative of the group that claimed to be the kidnappers was eventually scheduled for late one evening at Woodlawn Cemetery in the Bronx. According to Condon, the man sounded foreign but stayed in the shadows during the conversation, and Condon was thus unable to get a close look at his face. The man said his name was John, and he related his story: He was a "Scandinavian" sailor, part of a gang of three men and two women. The baby was being held on a boat, unharmed, but would be returned only for ransom. When Condon expressed doubt that "John" actually had the baby, he promised some proof: the kidnapper would soon return the baby's sleeping suit. The stranger asked Condon, "... would I burn if the package were dead?" When questioned further, he assured Condon that the baby was alive.

On March 16, Condon received a toddler's sleeping suit by mail, and a seventh ransom note. After Lindbergh identified the sleeping suit, Condon placed a new ad in the Home News: "Money is ready. No cops. No secret service. I come alone, like last time." On April 1 Condon received a letter saying it was time for the ransom to be delivered.

=== Ransom payment ===
The ransom was packaged in a wooden box that was custom-made in the hope that it could later be identified. Along with the usual Federal Reserve Notes, a number of the bills in the ransom were US Gold Certificates; since gold certificates were about to be withdrawn from circulation, it was hoped greater attention would be drawn to anyone who spent the bills or redeemed them for gold coins. None of the bills in the ransom were marked but their serial numbers had been recorded. Some sources credit this idea to Frank J. Wilson, others to Elmer Lincoln Irey.

On April 2, Condon was given a note by an intermediary, an unknown cab driver. Condon met "John" at St. Raymond's Cemetery in the Bronx and told him that they had been able to raise only $50,000. The man accepted the money and gave Condon a note saying that the child was in the care of two innocent women.

=== Discovery of the body ===
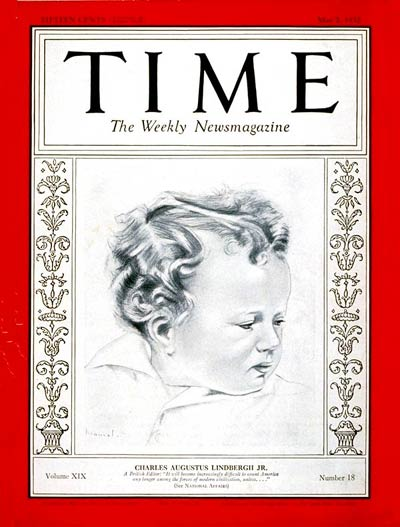
An illustration of Charles Jr. on the cover of Time magazine on May 2, 1932

On May 12, a delivery truck driver named Orville Wilson and his assistant William Allen pulled to the side of a road about 4.5 miles (7.2 km) south of the Lindbergh home near the hamlet of Mount Rose in neighboring Hopewell Township. Charles Lindbergh had lived in Mount Rose while his home was being constructed. When Allen went into a grove of trees to urinate, he discovered the decomposed body of a toddler. The skull was badly fractured and the body had been scavenged by animals; there were indications of an attempt at a hasty burial. Gow identified the baby as the missing infant from the overlapping toes of the right foot and a shirt that she had made. It appeared the child had been killed by a blow to the head. Lindbergh insisted on cremation.

In June 1932, officials began to suspect that the crime had been perpetrated by someone the Lindberghs knew. Suspicion fell upon Violet Sharpe, a British household servant at the Morrow home who had given contradictory information regarding her whereabouts on the night of the kidnapping. It was reported that she appeared nervous and suspicious when questioned. She died by suicide on June 10, 1932, by ingesting a silver polish that contained cyanide just before being questioned for the fourth time. Her alibi was later confirmed, and police were criticized for heavy-handedness.

Condon was also questioned by police and his home searched, but nothing incriminating was found. Charles Lindbergh stood by Condon during this time.

=== John Condon's unofficial investigation ===
After the discovery of the body, Condon remained unofficially involved in the case. To the public, he had become a suspect and in some circles was vilified. For the next two years, he visited police departments and pledged to find "Cemetery John".

Condon's actions regarding the case were increasingly flamboyant. On one occasion, while riding a city bus, Condon claimed that he saw a suspect on the street and, announcing his secret identity, ordered the bus to stop. The startled driver complied and Condon darted from the bus, although his target eluded him. Condon's actions were also criticized as exploitative when he agreed to appear in a vaudeville act regarding the kidnapping. Liberty magazine published a serialized account of Condon's involvement in the Lindbergh kidnapping under the title "Jafsie Tells All".

=== Tracking the ransom money ===
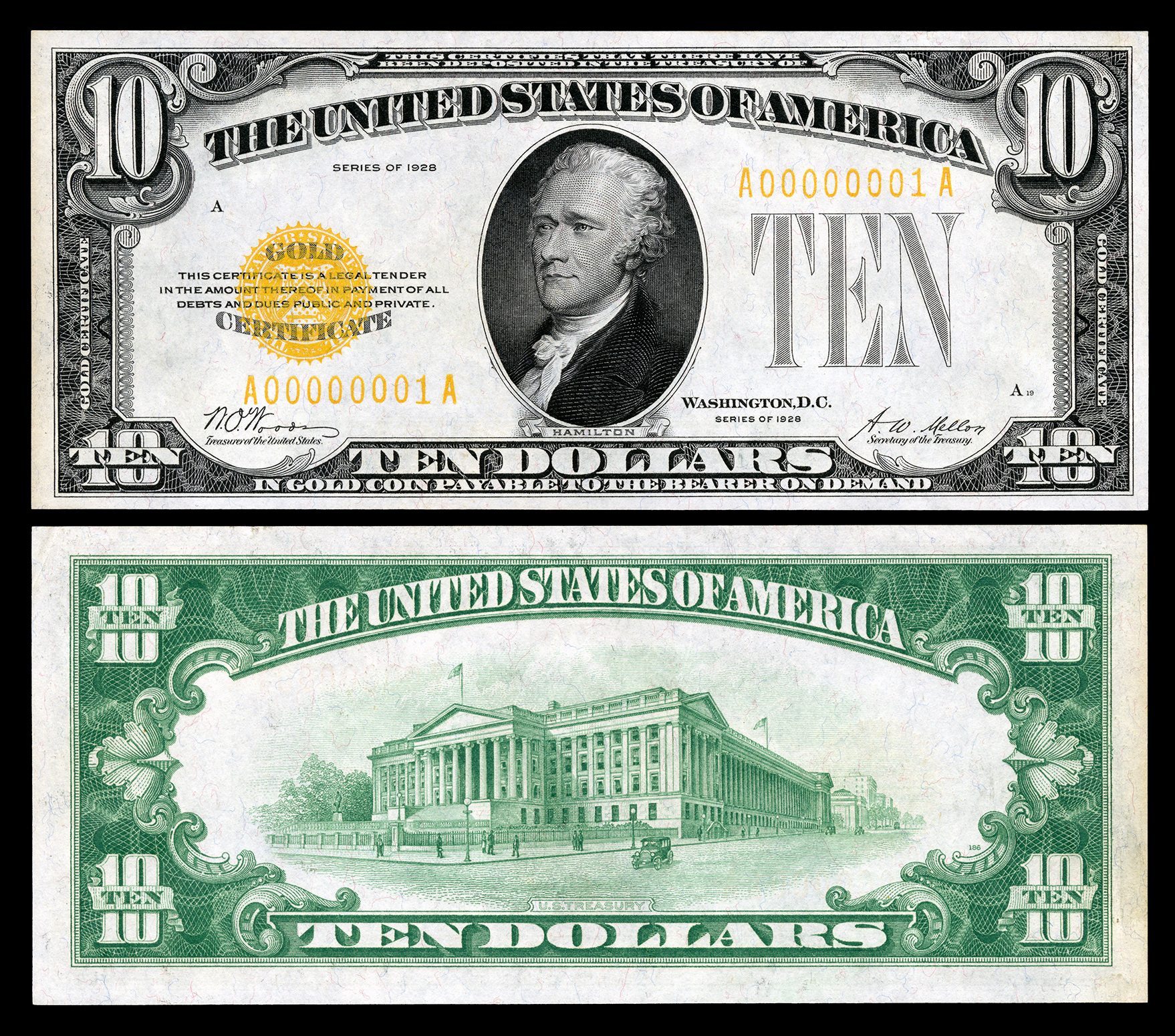
A 1928 series $10 gold certificate

The investigators who were working on the case were soon at a standstill. There were no developments and little evidence of any sort, so police turned their attention to tracking the ransom payments. A pamphlet was prepared with the serial numbers on the ransom bills, and 250,000 copies were distributed to businesses, mainly in New York City. A few of the ransom bills turned up in scattered locations, some as far away as Chicago and Minneapolis, but whoever spent the bills was never identified.

By a presidential order, all gold certificates were to be exchanged for other bills by May 1, 1933. A few days before the deadline, a man brought $2,980 to a Manhattan bank for exchange; it was later discovered that the bills were from the ransom. He had given his name as J. J. Faulkner of 537 West 149th Street. No one named Faulkner lived at that address, and a Jane Faulkner who had lived there 20 years earlier denied any involvement.

== Arrest of Hauptmann ==
During a 30-month period, a number of bills from the ransom were turning up throughout New York City. Detectives realized that many of the bills were being spent along the route of the Lexington Avenue subway, which connected the Bronx to the east side of Manhattan, including the German-Austrian neighborhood of Yorkville.

On September 18, 1934, a bank teller in Manhattan noticed a gold certificate from the ransom; a New York license plate number (4U-13-41-N.Y) penciled in the bill's margin allowed it to be traced to a nearby gas station. The station manager who received the bill had written down the license number on it because his customer was acting "suspicious" and believed he was "possibly a counterfeiter". The license plate belonged to a car owned by Bruno Richard Hauptmann of 1279 East 222nd Street in the Bronx, an immigrant with a criminal record in Germany. When Hauptmann was arrested, he was carrying a single 20-dollar gold certificate from the ransom and over $14,000 of the ransom money was found in a suitcase in his garage.

Hauptmann was arrested, interrogated, and beaten by police at least once throughout the following day and night. He stated that the money and other items had been left with him by his friend and former business partner Isidor Fisch. Fisch had died on March 29, 1934, shortly after returning to Germany. Hauptmann stated he learned only after Fisch's death that the suitcase that was left with him contained a considerable sum of money. He kept the money because he claimed that it was owed to him from a business deal that he and Fisch had made. Hauptmann consistently denied any connection to the crime or knowledge that the money found in his house was from the ransom.

When the police searched Hauptmann's home, a considerable amount of additional evidence was found, linking him to the crime. One item was a notebook containing a sketch of the construction of a ladder similar to the one found at the Lindbergh home in March 1932; John Condon's address and telephone number were discovered written on a closet wall in the house. Another key piece of evidence, a section of wood, was discovered in the attic of the home; after being examined by an expert, it was determined to be an exact match to the wood used in the construction of the ladder found at the crime scene.

On September 24, 1934, Hauptmann was indicted in the Bronx for extorting the $50,000 ransom from Charles Lindbergh. Two weeks later on October 8, Hauptmann was indicted in New Jersey for the murder of Charles Augustus Lindbergh Jr. Two days later, New York Governor Herbert H. Lehman surrendered Hauptmann to New Jersey authorities to face charges directly related to the kidnapping and murder of the child. On October 19, Hauptmann was moved to the Hunterdon County Jail in Flemington, New Jersey.

== Trial and execution ==
=== Trial ===
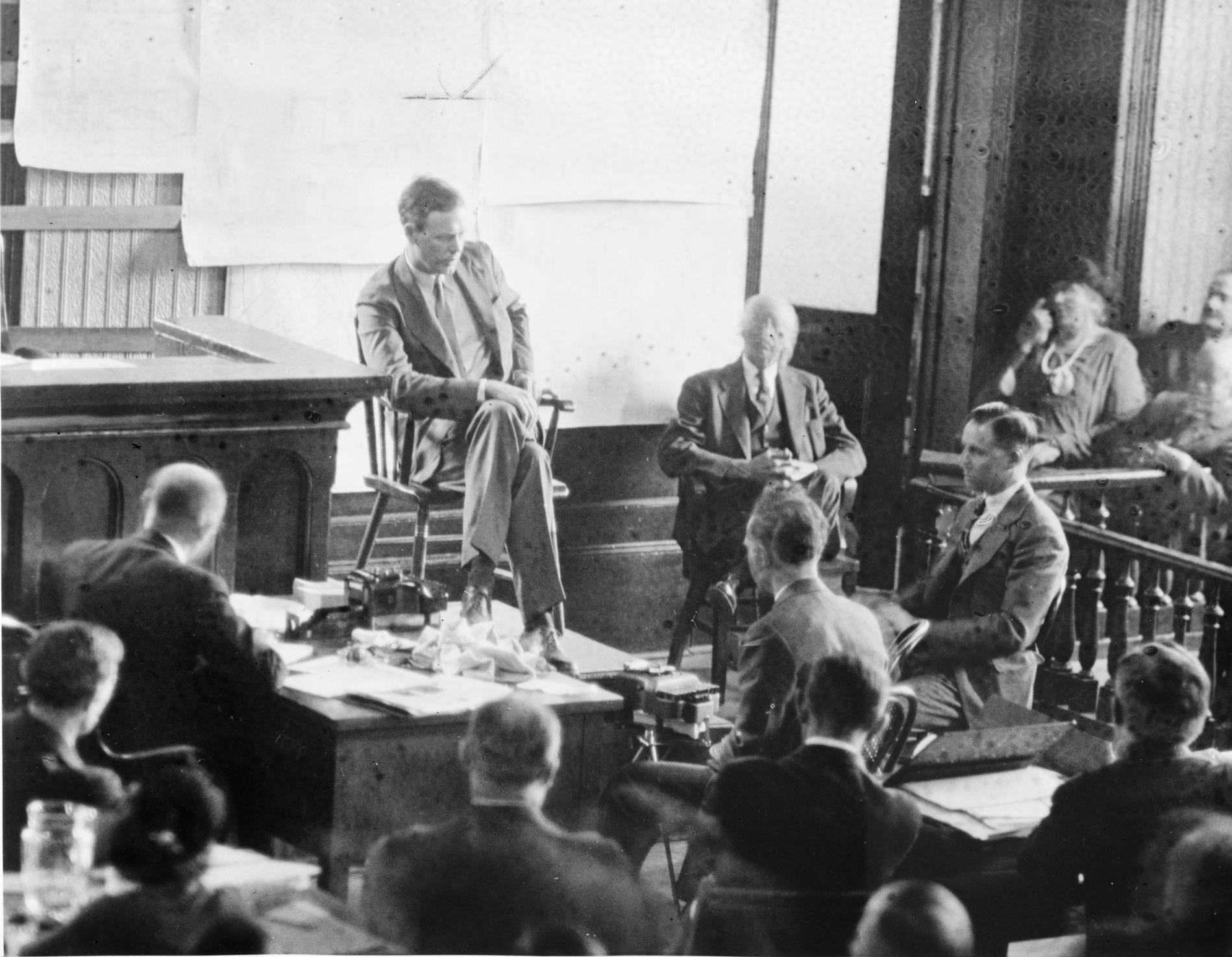
Lindbergh testifying at Hauptmann's trial. Hauptmann is in half-profile at right.

Hauptmann was charged with capital murder. The trial was held at the Hunterdon County Courthouse in Flemington, New Jersey, and was soon dubbed the "Trial of the Century". Reporters swarmed the town, and every hotel room was booked. Judge Thomas Whitaker Trenchard presided over the trial.

In exchange for rights to publish Hauptmann's story in their newspaper, Edward J. Reilly was hired by the New York Daily Mirror to serve as Hauptmann's attorney. David T. Wilentz, Attorney General of New Jersey, led the prosecution.

Evidence against Hauptmann included $20,000 of the ransom money found in his garage and testimony alleging that his handwriting and spelling were similar to those of the ransom notes. Eight handwriting experts, including Albert S. Osborn, pointed out similarities between the ransom notes and Hauptmann's writing specimens. The defense called an expert to rebut this evidence, while two others declined to testify; the latter two demanded $500 before looking at the notes and were dismissed when Lloyd Fisher, a member of Hauptmann's legal team, declined. Other experts retained by the defense were never called to testify.

On the basis of the work of Arthur Koehler at the Forest Products Laboratory, the State introduced photographs demonstrating that part of the wood from the ladder matched a plank from the floor of Hauptmann's attic: the type of wood, the direction of tree growth, the milling pattern, the inside and outside surface of the wood, and the grain on both sides were identical, and four oddly placed nail holes lined up with nail holes in joists in Hauptmann's attic. Condon's address and telephone number were written in pencil on a closet door in Hauptmann's home, and Hauptmann told police that he had written Condon's address:

I must have read it in the paper about the story. I was a little bit interested and keep a little bit record of it, and maybe I was just on the closet, and was reading the paper and put it down the address ... I can't give you any explanation about the telephone number.

A sketch that Wilentz suggested represented a ladder was found in one of Hauptmann's notebooks. Hauptmann said this picture and other sketches therein were the work of a child.

Despite not having an obvious source of earned income, Hauptmann had bought a $400 radio (approximately equivalent to $9,630 in 2025) and sent his wife on a trip to Germany.

Hauptmann was identified as the man ("John") to whom the ransom money was delivered. Other witnesses testified that it was Hauptmann who had spent some of the Lindbergh gold certificates; that he had been seen in the area of the estate, in East Amwell, New Jersey, near Hopewell, on the day of the kidnapping; and that he had been absent from work on the day of the ransom payment and had quit his job two days later. Hauptmann never sought another job afterward, yet continued to live comfortably.

When the prosecution rested its case, the defense opened with a lengthy examination of Hauptmann. In his testimony, Hauptmann denied being guilty, insisting that the box of gold certificates had been left in his garage by a friend, Isidor Fisch, who had returned to Germany in December 1933 and died there in March 1934. Hauptmann said that he had one day found a shoe box left behind by Fisch, which Hauptmann had stored on the top shelf of his kitchen broom closet, later discovering the money, which he later found to be almost $40,000 (approximately equivalent to $752,000 in 2025). Hauptmann said that, because Fisch had owed him about $7,500 in business funds, Hauptmann had kept the money for himself and had lived on it since January 1934.

The defense called Hauptmann's wife, Anna, to corroborate the Fisch story. On cross-examination, she admitted that while she hung her apron every day on a hook higher than the top shelf, she could not remember seeing any shoe box there. Later, rebuttal witnesses testified that Fisch could not have been at the scene of the crime, and that he had no money for medical treatments when he died of tuberculosis. Fisch's landlady testified that he could barely afford the $3.50 weekly rent of his room.

In his closing summation, Reilly argued that the evidence against Hauptmann was entirely circumstantial, because no reliable witness had placed Hauptmann at the scene of the crime, nor were his fingerprints found on the ladder, on the ransom notes, or anywhere in the nursery.

=== Appeals ===
Hauptmann was convicted on February 13, 1935, and immediately sentenced to death. His attorneys appealed to the New Jersey Court of Errors and Appeals, which at the time was the state's highest court; the appeal was argued on June 29, 1935.

New Jersey Governor Harold G. Hoffman secretly visited Hauptmann in his cell on the evening of October 16, accompanied by a stenographer who spoke German fluently. Hoffman urged members of the Court of Errors and Appeals to visit Hauptmann.

In late January 1936, while declaring that he held no position on the guilt or innocence of Hauptmann, Hoffman cited evidence that the crime was not a "one person" job and directed Schwarzkopf to continue a thorough and impartial investigation in an effort to bring all parties involved to justice.

It became known among the press that on March 27, Hoffman was considering a second reprieve of Hauptmann's death sentence and was seeking opinions about whether the governor had the right to issue a second reprieve.

On March 30, 1936, Hauptmann's second and final appeal asking for clemency from the New Jersey Board of Pardons was denied. Hoffman later announced that this decision would be the final legal action in the case, and that he would not grant another reprieve. Nonetheless, there was a postponement, when the Mercer County grand jury, investigating the confession and arrest of Trenton attorney, Paul Wendel, requested a delay from Warden Mark Kimberling. This, the final stay, ended when the Mercer County prosecutor informed Kimberling that the grand jury had adjourned after voting to end its investigation without charging Wendel.

=== Execution ===
Hauptmann turned down a large offer from a Hearst newspaper for a confession and refused a last-minute offer to commute his sentence from the death penalty to life without parole in exchange for a confession. He was executed by the electric chair on April 3, 1936.

After his death, some reporters and independent investigators raised numerous questions about the way in which the investigation had been run and the fairness of the trial, including witness tampering and planted evidence. Twice in the 1980s, Anna Hauptmann sued the state of New Jersey for the unjust execution of her husband. The suits were dismissed due to prosecutorial immunity and because the statute of limitations had run out. She continued fighting to clear his name until her death, at age 95, in 1994.

== Alternative theories ==
A number of books have asserted Hauptmann's innocence, generally highlighting inadequate police work at the crime scene, Lindbergh's interference in the investigation, the ineffectiveness of Hauptmann's counsel, and weaknesses in the witnesses and physical evidence. Ludovic Kennedy, in particular, questioned much of the evidence, such as the origin of the ladder and the testimony of many of the witnesses.

According to author Lloyd Gardner, a fingerprint expert – Erastus Mead Hudson – applied the then-rare silver nitrate fingerprint process to the ladder and did not find Hauptmann's fingerprints, even in places that the maker of the ladder must have touched. According to Gardner, officials refused to consider this expert's findings, and the ladder was then washed of all fingerprints.

Jim Fisher, a former FBI agent and professor at Edinboro University of Pennsylvania, has written two books, The Lindbergh Case (1987) and The Ghosts of Hopewell (1999), addressing what he calls a "revision movement" regarding the case. He summarizes:

Today, the Lindbergh phenomena [sic] is a giant hoax perpetrated by people who are taking advantage of an uninformed and cynical public. Notwithstanding all of the books, TV programs, and legal suits, Hauptmann is as guilty today as he was in 1932 when he kidnapped and killed the son of Mr. and Mrs. Charles Lindbergh.

Another book, Hauptmann's Ladder: A Step-by-Step Analysis of the Lindbergh Kidnapping by Richard T. Cahill Jr., concludes that Hauptmann was guilty but questions whether he should have been executed.

According to John Reisinger in his book Master Detective, New Jersey detective Ellis H. Parker conducted an independent investigation in 1936 and obtained a signed confession from former Trenton attorney Paul Wendel, creating a sensation and resulting in a temporary stay of execution for Hauptmann. The case against Wendel collapsed, however, when he insisted his confession had been coerced.

Robert Zorn's 2012 book Cemetery John proposes that Hauptmann was part of a conspiracy with two other German-born men, John and Walter Knoll. Zorn's father, economist Eugene Zorn, believed that as a teenager he had witnessed the conspiracy being discussed.

== In popular culture ==
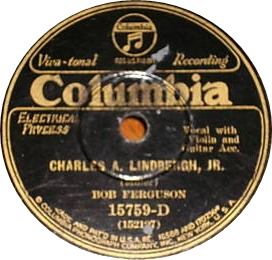
Record label of "Charles A. Lindbergh, Jr." by Bob Ferguson

=== In novels ===
- 1934: Agatha Christie was inspired by circumstances of the case when she described the kidnapping of Daisy Armstrong in her Hercule Poirot novel Murder on the Orient Express.
- 1981: The kidnapping and its aftermath served as the inspiration for Maurice Sendak's book Outside Over There.
- 1991: Max Allan Collins's novel Stolen Away, fifth in his Nathan Heller series, in which the fictional private eye gets involved in real historical mysteries and meets historical figures, Heller gets involved in investigating the Lindbergh kidnapping, interviews psychic Edgar Cayce, and decades later meets a man whom they both believe to be the kidnapped and never returned Charles Lindbergh, Jr., having been raised and lived his whole life under another name. It won the 1992 Shamus Award for best hardcover private eye novel.
- 1993: In the novel Along Came a Spider by James Patterson and the film based on the novel, a character takes inspiration from the Lindbergh kidnapping for his crime.
- 2004: The kidnapping is discussed at length in Philip Roth's alternate history novel The Plot Against America, in which Charles Lindbergh is elected President in the 1940 United States presidential election, defeating Franklin Delano Roosevelt;
- 2008: The kidnapping served as inspiration in Margaret Peterson Haddix's The Missing series.
- 2013: The Aviator's Wife by Melanie Benjamin is a work of historical fiction told from the perspective of Anne Morrow Lindbergh.
- 2022: The Lindbergh Nanny by Mariah Fredericks is a work of historical fiction told from the perspective of Betty Gow.

=== In comics ===
- 2005: Finder Vol 7: The Rescuers by Carla Speed McNeil is a work of graphic fiction that was inspired by the Lindbergh kidnapping but set in the fictional domed city of Anvard.

=== In music ===
- May 1932: Just one day after the Lindbergh baby was discovered murdered, the prolific country recording artist Bob Miller (under the pseudonym Bob Ferguson) recorded two songs for Columbia on May 13, 1932, commemorating the event. The songs were released on Columbia 15759-D with the titles "Charles A. Lindbergh, Jr." and "There's a New Star Up in Heaven (Baby Lindy Is Up There)".

=== In film ===
- 2011: The kidnapping, investigation, and trial are featured in J. Edgar, the biopic of J. Edgar Hoover, Director of the FBI (directed by Clint Eastwood and starring Leonardo DiCaprio).

=== In television ===
- 1976: The Lindbergh Kidnapping Case
- 1996: Crime of the Century

== See also ==
- List of kidnappings
- Lists of solved missing person cases

== General and cited references ==
- Ahlgren, Gregory; Monier, Stephen (1993). Crime of the Century: The Lindbergh kidnapping hoax. Branden Books. ISBN 0-8283-1971-5.
- Behn, Noel (1994). Lindbergh: The Crime. Atlantic Monthly Press. ISBN 0-8711-3544-2.
- Berg, A. Scott (1998). Lindbergh. G. P. Putnam's Sons. ISBN 0-3991-4449-8.
- Cahill, Richard T. Jr. (2014). Hauptmann's Ladder: A Step-by-Step Analysis of the Lindbergh Kidnapping. Kent State University Press. ISBN 978-1-60635-193-2.
- Cook, William A. (2014). The Lindbergh Baby Kidnapping. Sunbury Press. ISBN 978-1-6200-6339-2.
- Doherty, Thomas (2020). Little Lindy Is Kidnapped: How the Media Covered the Crime of the Century. Columbia University Press. ISBN 978-0-2311-9848-6.
- Fisher, Jim (1994) [1987]. The Lindbergh Case. Rutgers University Press. ISBN 0-8135-2147-5.
- Fisher, Jim (2006). The Ghosts of Hopewell: Setting the Record Straight in the Lindbergh Case. Southern Illinois University Press. ISBN 978-0-8093-2717-1.
- Gardner, Lloyd C. (2004). The Case That Never Dies: The Lindbergh Kidnapping. Rutgers University Press. ISBN 0-813-53385-6.
- Kennedy, Sir Ludovic (1985). The Airman and the Carpenter: The Lindbergh Kidnapping and the Framing of Richard Hauptmann. Viking Press. ISBN 0-670-80606-4.
- Kurland, Michael (1994). A Gallery of Rogues: Portraits in True Crime. Prentice Hall General Reference. ISBN 0-671-85011-3.
- Melsky, Michael (2016). Of the Lindbergh Kidnapping. The Dark Corners. Vol. 1. Infinity Publishing. ISBN 978-1-4958-1042-8.
- Milton, Joyce (1993). Loss of Eden: A biography of Charles and Anne Morrow Lindbergh. HarperCollins. ISBN 0-0601-6503-0.
- Newton, Michael (2004). The Encyclopedia of Unsolved Crimes. Checkmark Books. ISBN 0-8160-4981-5.
- Norris, William (2007). A Talent to Deceive. SynergEbooks. ISBN 978-0-7443-1594-3.
- Reisinger, John (2006). Master Detective: Ellis Parker's independent investigation. Citadel Press. ISBN 978-0-8065-2750-5.
- Scaduto, Anthony (1976). Scapegoat: The Lonesome Death of Richard Hauptmann. G. P. Putnam's Sons. ISBN 0-3991-1660-5.
- Schrager, Adam J. (2013). The Sixteenth Rail: The evidence, the scientist, and the Lindbergh kidnapping. Fulcrum Publishing. ISBN 978-1-5559-1716-6.
- Waller, George (1961). Kidnap: The Story of the Lindbergh case. Dial Press.
- Wilson, Colin (1992). Murder in the 1930s. Carroll & Graf. ISBN 978-0-881-84855-7.
- Zorn, Robert (2012). Cemetery John: The undiscovered mastermind of the Lindbergh kidnapping. Overlook Press. ISBN 978-1-5902-0856-4.
