= Arthur Koehler =

American scientist

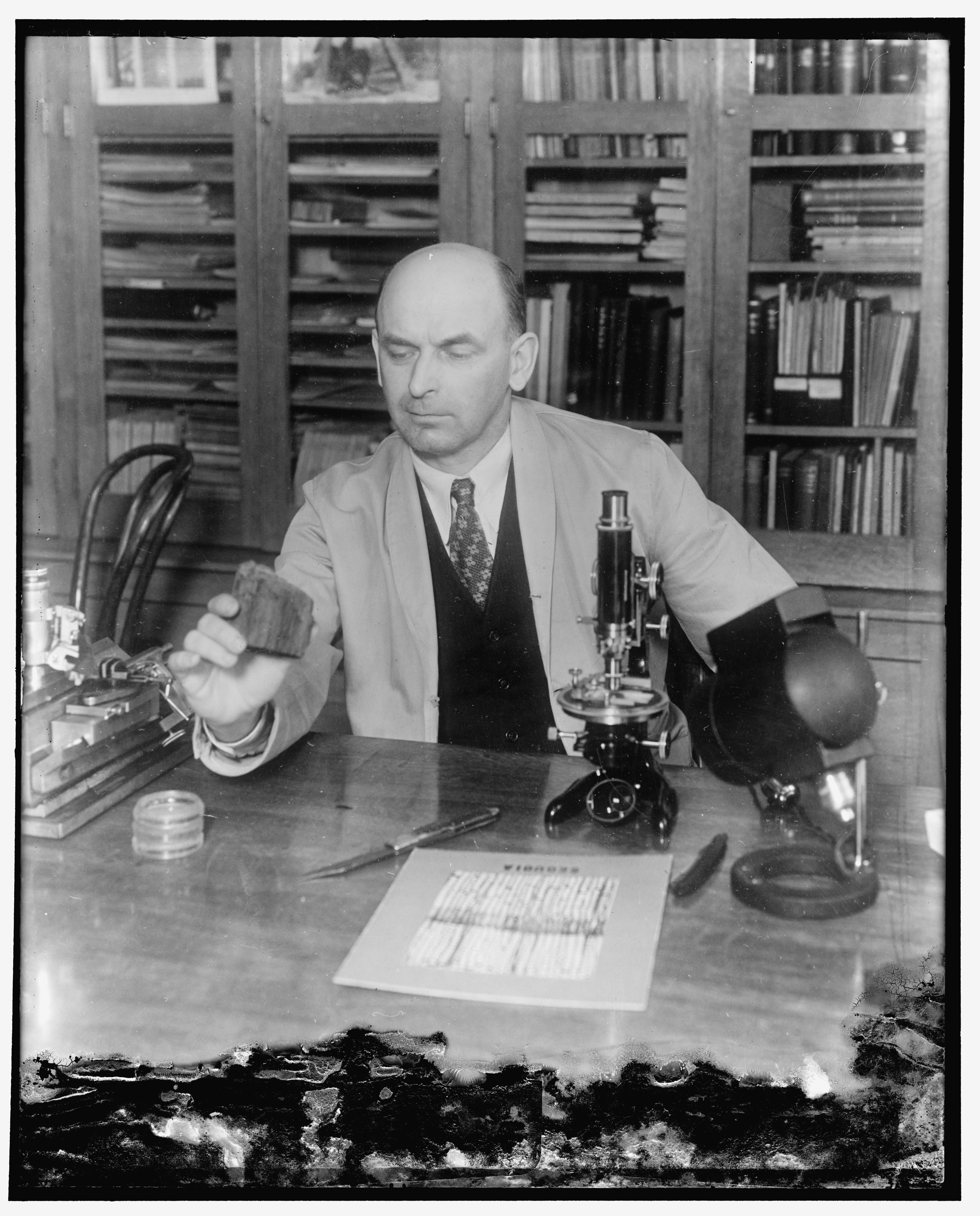
- Born: 1885; Mishicot, Wisconsin, United States
- Died: 1967 (aged 81–82); Los Angeles, California, United States
- Occupation(s): Chief wood technologist, Botanist

Arthur Koehler (1885–1967) was a chief wood technologist at the Forest Products Laboratory in Madison, Wisconsin, and was important in the development of wood forensics in the 1930s through his role in the investigation of the Lindbergh kidnapping. Koehler's particular research interest in the identification, cellular structure and growth of wood gave him the specific training and abilities necessary for the careful examination of the ladder which had been used by the abductor of Charles Lindbergh Jr., aged twenty months, and the tracing of the ladder to a company in McCormick, South Carolina. Koehler, from there, traced the wood of the ladder to a Bronx lumber yard.

In the trial of Bruno Richard Hauptmann, Koehler brought out his evidence which helped to indict Hauptmann of the kidnapping and sent Hauptmann to the electric chair. After it was discovered that plank had disappeared from Hauptmann's attic, Koehler brought out his evidence: the wood he traced to Hauptmann. He proved, by fitting the two pieces together, that the attic board matched with the ladder rail used by the kidnapper, giving evidence that Hauptmann built the ladder. His evidence contributed to the jury's decision to execute Bruno Richard Hauptmann.

In the film J. Edgar Koehler was played by actor Stephen Root.
