= Ellis H. Parker =

American detective (1871–1940)

Ellis Howard Parker Sr. (September 12, 1871 – February 4, 1940) was an American law enforcement officer. Parker was the Chief County Detective for Burlington County, New Jersey, for forty years. His reputation for solving challenging crimes led to him being popularized as the "American Sherlock Holmes". (Note: That epithet was also applied to Edward O. Heinrich.)

Parker conducted a personal investigation into the Lindbergh kidnapping. Having decided that the convicted Bruno Richard Hauptmann was not the real culprit, Parker arranged to capture his own suspect and force him to write a confession. Parker was convicted of kidnapping and sentenced to six years in federal prison. He died in prison of a brain tumor, and was granted a posthumous pardon.

== Early life ==
Parker was born on September 12, 1871, to a Quaker family in New Jersey, near Wrightstown. As a teenager, he performed on a fiddle at barn dances. After one performance, his horse and cart were stolen. Parker identified the farm where the horse and cart had been taken, then hired the Monmouth, Ocean, and Burlington County Detecting and Pursuing Association to help him retrieve them. (Note: Burlington County did not have a sheriff at the time, so private companies provided similar services.)

== Career ==
The Monmouth, Ocean, and Burlington County Detecting and Pursuing Association was impressed by Parker's investigation when his horse and cart were stolen and hired him in 1891.

Publicity of Parker's detecting activities, a product of his self-promotion and a good relationship with the local press, brought him to the attention of the Burlington County prosecutor, Eckard P. Budd, who had decided that the growing county needed a fulltime law enforcement office. Budd appointed Parker the first chief detective of the county in 1894. He was paid a fee for each crime solved, rather than a salary.

Most of his early cases involved bootlegging and horse stealing. In 1896, Parker disguised himself as a drunk to infiltrate a gang of arsonists who had set numerous fires in the county over two years. With the information he gathered, he obtained a confession from one of the men that also implicated other men involved.

One of Parker's theories was that the suspect with the best alibi is most likely to be guilty, an approach that helped him solve a murder of a soldier that involved hundreds of suspects. By focusing on the man with an alibi, Parker produced a confession to the crime.

In a murder case in which a body was found in a dry grave with soaked clothing, Parker obtained a chemist's analysis of water near the location the body had been found. The concentration of tannic acid in that stream preserved the remains so that the time of death apparent to the coroners were inaccurate. Parker and the Camden County detective chief who had requested Parker's assistance tracked down and convicted the assailants. Parker's detective work in this case, popularly called the "Case of the Pickled Corpse", was mentioned in criminology and forensic textbooks.

Parker declared that the 1929 deaths of Ruth Wilson and her fiancé Horace Roberts Jr. were a case of murder–suicide, only to be ridiculed when it was learned that Roberts had been shot in the head four times.

Over the years, Parker became known as the "American Sherlock Holmes". Parker's reputation relied as much upon his courting of publicity as it did his abilities as a detective. As he gained a reputation as a celebrity detective, other jurisdictions asked for his assistance on cases. He investigated 1000 crimes a year, and was consulted by Scotland Yard and the Surete. His investigations ranged from horse theft, bootlegging, and robbery, to rape and murder. Parker obtained convictions in most of his murder investigations, although reported numbers vary. In his obituary, the New York Times reported that Parker had handled 236 murders and obtained convictions in 226 of those cases.

Parker's approach to detective work was sometimes described as "rough-and-ready", and his methods could hew close to the line of legality. He knew everyone in the county by name. It was rumored that he would jail everyone involved with a case until he identified the culprit. Frank Fitzpatrick, a journalist who knew Parker well, described Parker's approach to suspects as "fatherly": "He'd buy you a cup and coffee and talk and before you knew it, he was in there taking a statement from you." In 1935, Fletcher Pratt published a collection of Parker's cases, The Cunning Mulatto, and Other Cases of Ellis Parker, American Detective. Reviewer John Selby called it "just about the most interesting thing of its kind in years".

=== Lindbergh kidnapping ===
On March 1, 1932, Charles Augustus Lindbergh Jr., the 20-month-old son of Col. Charles Lindbergh and his wife, aviator and author Anne Morrow Lindbergh, was abducted from his crib in the upper floor of the Lindberghs' home, Highfields, in East Amwell, New Jersey. The governor put the New Jersey State Police under Superintendent Norman Schwarzkopf Sr. in charge of the investigation. Parker was not part of the official investigation, but he received phone calls offering information. Although some were hoaxes, one set of calls seemed to have some credible information about the kidnapping. Parker and his secretary both thought that the caller, who tried to disguise his voice, was Paul Wendel.

Parker knew Paul Wendel as the son of an old acquaintance. Wendel was a pharmacist who became a lawyer but then was suspended and imprisoned for perjury. After receiving a pardon in 1924, he was reinstated to the bar the following year. Their families socialized on occasion. Wendel contacted Parker for advice in 1931, when he was facing warrants for embezzlement and writing bad checks.

A week after the kidnapping, Wendel visited Parker's office and offered his assistance with the kidnapping, suggesting that he could contact his organized crime associates to help. Parker provided him a letter promising secrecy as long as the child was returned. Wendel's investigations never turned up any solid information, but Parker became suspicious of how much Wendel knew and began to entertain the idea that Wendel might have been involved in the crime.

Parker's offers to assist in the Lindbergh kidnapping investigation were rebuffed. He asked an intermediary to suggest to the governor that Parker be put on the Lindbergh case. As Parker and Scharzkopf did not get along and there were concerns about Parker getting all of the publicity, Governor A. Harry Moore asked Parker to look into the kidnapping unofficially.

As Parker had no official status on the investigation, Schwarzkopf refused to share any information or evidence with him. Parker was investigating on his own, until he was asked by Harold G. Hoffman, head of the New Jersey Department of Motor Vehicles, to take charge of their investigation into the kidnapping. Within a week, Parker's team arrested a car theft ring near the Lindbergh property. Although it was unrelated to the kidnapping, it embarrassed the state police.

Wendel was still assisting Parker in his investigation, although Parker had become more certain that Wendel was directly involved in the kidnapping. When the child's body was found on May 12, Parker publicly criticized the state police's investigation. After Parker obtained photographs of the body from a reporter, he declared that it was not the Lindbergh baby, which Wendel confirmed to him, which Parker took as more evidence that Wendel was involved.

For more than two years, the various investigations by multiple agencies failed to identify a suspect in the crime. Parker continued to appear in the headlines for his successes on other cases while continuing his personal investigation into the kidnapping. A New York psychiatrist produced a profile of the kidnapper that would fit Bruno Richard Hauptmann, who was eventually convicted of the crime, but to Parker the profile was also an accurate description of Wendel.

After Hauptmann was arrested, Parker was certain that he was not the kidnapper. Governor Harold G. Hoffman authorized Parker to investigate his suspicions. Hours before Hauptmann was to be executed, Parker produced a 25-page confession signed by Paul H. Wendel that claimed Wendel was the kidnapper. Hauptmann's execution was delayed.

When Wendel was in custody, he claimed that he had been kidnapped, held prisoner, and tortured until he agreed to confess to the crime. Parker and his accomplices were charged in federal court for violating the Lindbergh Law, a federal law against kidnapping that had been passed soon after the Lindbergh crime. At the time, their trial was the longest in New Jersey history. Parker was sentenced to six years. The sentencing judge said of Parker:

Your life as a law enforcement officer and the position of power that you have reached in the community has given you the feeling that you are above the law, that what you want to do is the right thing to do, whether the law permits it or not...

Parker lost on appeal, and served his sentence at the Federal prison in Lewisburg, Pennsylvania.

== Personal life and death ==
Parker married Cora Giberson on February 19, 1900. Over the forty years of their marriage, they had 15 children.

Parker became ill around six months after he was imprisoned. He died in prison of a brain tumor on February 4, 1940, with his son by his side.

Upon Parker's death, former governor Hoffman said:

Ellis Parker may have been mistaken. He and the fine clean-cut young son who had an abiding faith in his father's skill may have even resorted to extra-legal means to bring about the conviction of a man whom they believed to be guilty and to save the life of a man they believed to be innocent. That Ellis Parker, out of all the enforcement officials who may have been mistaken, should have been singled out after a long and honorable career for prosecution and conviction represents a great tragedy.

An obituary said "in time Ellis Parker came to believe the Ellis Parker legend".
