= J. Edgar =

2011 film by Clint Eastwood

- Theatrical release poster
- Directed by: Clint Eastwood
- Written by: Dustin Lance Black
- Produced by: Clint Eastwood; Brian Grazer; Robert Lorenz
- Starring: Leonardo DiCaprio; Armie Hammer; Naomi Watts; Judi Dench; Josh Lucas
- Cinematography: Tom Stern
- Edited by: Joel Cox; Gary D. Roach
- Music by: Clint Eastwood
- Production companies: Imagine Entertainment; Malpaso Productions; Wintergreen Productions
- Distributed by: Warner Bros. Pictures
- Release dates: November 3, 2011 (AFI Film Festival); November 9, 2011 (United States)
- Running time: 137 minutes
- Country: United States
- Language: English
- Budget: $35 million
- Box office: $84.9 million

J. Edgar is a 2011 American biographical drama film based on the career of FBI director J. Edgar Hoover, directed and produced by Clint Eastwood. Written by Dustin Lance Black, the film focuses on Hoover's life from the 1919 Palmer Raids onward. The film stars Leonardo DiCaprio in the title role along with Armie Hammer, Naomi Watts, Josh Lucas, and Judi Dench, and features Adam Driver in his film debut.

J. Edgar opened the AFI Fest 2011 in Los Angeles on November 3, 2011, and had its limited release by Warner Bros. Pictures on November 9, 2011, followed by wide release on November 11. The film received mixed reviews from critics, although DiCaprio's performance was widely praised, and it grossed $84.9 million worldwide. It was chosen by the National Board of Review and American Film Institute as one of the top ten films of 2011, while DiCaprio earned a nomination for a Golden Globe Award and both he and Hammer earned Screen Actors Guild Award nods (Hammer was nominated for Outstanding Performance by a Male Actor in a Supporting Role).

== Plot ==
The film uses a nonlinear narrative, alternating between J. Edgar Hoover's role in establishing the Federal Bureau of Investigation (FBI) and his later years trying to safeguard it against perceived threats. As a frame story, the aging Hoover narrates the events of the Bureau's early years to a series of agents he has assigned to ghostwrite a book about it.

In 1919, Attorney General A. Mitchell Palmer survives an assassination attempt by anarchists and assigns Justice Department employee Hoover to a division dedicated to purging radicals. Helen Gandy rejects Hoover's awkward advances, but becomes his personal secretary and confidant. By arranging to make the anarchist Emma Goldman eligible for deportation, Hoover creates legal precedent to deport numerous other radicals. Following the Palmer Raids, Palmer loses his job and his successor, Harlan F. Stone, appoints Hoover as director of the department's Bureau of Investigation. Hoover has Gandy create a confidential file in which he collects incriminating information on people in power.

With the First Red Scare over, Hoover focuses the Bureau on fighting gangsters. When the Lindbergh kidnapping captures national attention in 1932, he urges passage of the Federal Kidnapping Act, increasing the Bureau's power. He establishes the FBI Laboratory, applying forensic science techniques to the investigation, and has the registration numbers on the ransom bills monitored. Though Charles Lindbergh Jr. is found dead, these techniques lead to the arrest and conviction of Bruno Richard Hauptmann for the crime.

Well into adulthood, Hoover continues to live with his mother, who is his moral guide. He hires Clyde Tolson to the Bureau in 1930; the two develop a rapport and Hoover promotes Tolson to associate director. When Hoover confesses to his mother that he is uncomfortable in romantic situations with women, she says she would rather have him dead than gay. When Tolson tells Hoover that he loves him, Hoover panics and claims that he wants to marry actress Dorothy Lamour. Tolson becomes infuriated and the two fight, culminating in Tolson kissing Hoover and threatening to end their association if Hoover ever talks about another woman again. Hoover's mother dies, and he is grief-stricken.

Following an embarrassing line of questioning by Senate Appropriations Committee chair Kenneth McKellar in 1933, Hoover becomes increasingly vengeful against those who challenge his reputation and the Bureau's. He uses covert listening devices to collect compromising information which he uses to blackmail political figures over the years, including President Franklin D. Roosevelt and Attorney General Robert F. Kennedy, protecting his position and increasing the Bureau's power. He starts COINTELPRO, an illegal counterintelligence program, to fight what he perceives as a new wave of radicals, culminating in his failed attempt to blackmail Martin Luther King Jr. into declining the Nobel Peace Prize in 1964 via the FBI–King letter.

Tolson suffers a stroke, and Hoover's strength declines with age. Fearing that President Richard Nixon will acquire his confidential files and use them to ruin the FBI's reputation, he asks Gandy to keep them out of Nixon's hands. Tolson urges Hoover to retire and accuses him of exaggerating his involvement with key events in the Bureau's history. Hoover admits his feelings for Tolson before dying at home. Gandy destroys Hoover's files before Nixon's men can seize them.

== Cast ==
- Leonardo DiCaprio as J. Edgar Hoover
- Armie Hammer as Clyde Tolson
- Naomi Watts as Helen Gandy
- Josh Lucas as Charles Lindbergh
- Judi Dench as Annie Hoover, Hoover's mother
- Dermot Mulroney as New Jersey State Police superintendent Norman Schwarzkopf Sr.
- Jeffrey Donovan as Robert F. Kennedy
- Denis O'Hare as document expert Albert S. Osborn
- Stephen Root as wood expert Arthur Koehler
- Damon Herriman as Bruno Richard Hauptmann
- Lea Thompson as Lela E. Rogers, mother of actress Ginger Rogers
- Ken Howard as Harlan F. Stone
- Josh Hamilton as Robert Irwin
- Jessica Hecht as Emma Goldman
- Geoff Pierson as A. Mitchell Palmer
- Michael O'Neill as Kenneth McKellar
- Josh Stamberg as Agent Stokes
- Zach Grenier as John Condon, intermediary in the Lindbergh kidnapping
- Christopher Shyer as Richard Nixon
- Ed Westwick, Michael Rady, Miles Fisher, and Ary Katz as Hoover's ghostwriters (respectively, Agents Smith, Jones, Garrison, and Owens)

J. Edgar marked Adam Driver's feature film debut, as gas station manager Walter Lyle. Eastwood's son Kyle Eastwood, who composed some music for the film, appears as a member of the Stork Club band alongside trumpeter Kye Palmer, in a scene with Michael Gladis as the club owner and Amanda Schull as actress Anita Colby. Gunner Wright and David A. Cooper appear briefly as future Presidents Dwight D. Eisenhower and Franklin D. Roosevelt, respectively, in the aftermath of the assassination attempt on A. Mitchell Palmer.

Additional minor roles were played by Kaitlyn Dever as Palmer's daughter; Jack Donner as Hoover's father; Jordan Bridges as a lawyer for the Department of Labor; Christian Clemenson as Immigration Inspector Schell; Geoff Stults as Special Agent Raymond Caffrey; Sadie Calvano as Hoover's niece; Ryan McPartlin as Lawrence Richey, secretary to President Herbert Hoover; Kahil Dotay as IRS Intelligence Unit Chief Elmer Lincoln Irey; David Clennon as Senator Friendly of the Appropriations Committee; Manu Intiraymi as gangster Alvin Karpis; Emily Alyn Lind as actress Shirley Temple; Gerald Downey as an FBI agent; Austin Basis as a bank teller; Eric Matheny as Hoover's doctor; Aaron Lazar as David T. Wilentz, prosecutor in Hauptmann's trail; and Maxine Weldon as Hoover's maid.

== Production ==
Brian Grazer had been considering making a film about Hoover, and approached Dustin Lance Black to write the screenplay. Black began working on it in 2008, producing several drafts over a two-year period. Warner Bros. Pictures wanted to keep the budget down, so producers Grazer and Robert Lorenz brought in Clint Eastwood, known for his efficient filmmaking, to direct and co-produce. Eastwood was able to shoot the film in 39 days and complete it under budget, for a total of $35 million.

Unnamed sources cited by The Hollywood Reporter claimed that Leonardo DiCaprio dropped his usual fee from $20 million to $2 million to star in the film. For scenes in which he played the aged Hoover, DiCaprio had to spend up to six hours having makeup applied. Charlize Theron was originally slated to play Helen Gandy, but dropped out of the project to do Snow White and the Huntsman. Eastwood considered Amy Adams before finally hiring Naomi Watts.

Though much of the film is set in Washington, D.C., only a few scenes were shot there, including the interior of the Library of Congress and the view from the balcony of Hoover's former office. The exterior of the courthouse in Warrenton, Virginia was used to represent the Hunterdon County Courthouse in Flemington, New Jersey, where Richard Hauptmann's trial took place. Scenes set inside the courthouse were filmed at the Old Orange County Courthouse in Santa Ana, California. Scenes of the Lindbergh estate were shot in The Plains, Virginia, while Arlington County, Virginia was filmed for some historic neighborhoods.

Most of the film was shot in and around Los Angeles. Sets representing the hallways of the United States Department of Justice and several offices were built on Stage 16 at the Warner Bros. Studios in Burbank. The Cicada Restaurant, near Pershing Square, stood in for New York's Stork Club, while the Park Plaza Hotel served as both the men's department of Garfinckel's department store and the United States Senate chamber. The Pico House represented a train station for a scene depicting the Kansas City massacre. Some interior restaurant scenes were filmed at the Smoke House Restaurant, across the street from the Warner Bros. Studios.

== Reception ==
=== Critical response ===
On review aggregator website Rotten Tomatoes reports an approval rating of 44% based on 242 reviews, with an average rating of 5.72/10. The website's critical consensus reads, "Leonardo DiCaprio gives a predictable powerhouse performance, but J. Edgar stumbles in all other departments: cheesy makeup, poor lighting, confusing narrative, and humdrum storytelling." Metacritic, which assigns a weighted average rating to reviews, gives the film a normalized score of 59 out of 100, based on 42 critics, indicating "mixed or average" reviews. Audiences polled by CinemaScore gave the film an average grade of "B" on an A+ to F scale.

Roger Ebert awarded the film three and a half out of four stars and wrote that the film is "fascinating" and "masterful". He praised DiCaprio's work as a "fully-realized, subtle and persuasive performance, hinting at more than Hoover ever revealed, perhaps even to himself". Todd McCarthy of The Hollywood Reporter gave the film a positive review, writing, "This surprising collaboration between director Clint Eastwood and Milk screenwriter Dustin Lance Black tackles its trickiest challenges with plausibility and good sense, while serving up a simmeringly caustic view of its controversial subject's behavior, public and private."

David Denby in The New Yorker magazine also liked the film, calling it a "nuanced account" and calling "Eastwood's touch light and sure, his judgment sound, the moments of pathos held just long enough." J. Hoberman of The Village Voice wrote: "Although hardly flawless, Eastwood's biopic is his richest, most ambitious movie since Letters from Iwo Jima and Flags of Our Fathers."

Peter Debruge of Variety gave the film a mixed review: "Any movie in which the longtime FBI honcho features as the central character must supply some insight into what made him tick, or suffer from the reality that the Bureau's exploits were far more interesting than the bureaucrat who ran it – a dilemma J. Edgar never rises above."

David Edelstein of New York Magazine reacted negatively to the film and said: "It's too bad J. Edgar is so shapeless and turgid and ham-handed, so rich in bad lines and worse readings." He praised DiCaprio's performance: "There's something appealingly straightforward about the way he physicalizes Hoover's inner struggle, the body always slightly out of sync with the mind that vigilantly monitors every move."

=== Box office ===
The film opened limited in 7 theaters on November 9, grossing $52,645, and released wide on November 11, grossing $11.2 million in its opening weekend, approximating the $12 million figure projected by the Los Angeles Times for the film's opening weekend in the United States and Canada. J. Edgar went on to gross over $84.9 million worldwide and over $37.3 million at the domestic box office. Breakdowns of audience demographics for the movie showed that ticket buyers were nearly 95% over the age of 25 and slightly over 50% female.

=== Accolades ===
List of awards and nominations for J. Edgar
Date of ceremony	Award	Category	Recipient(s)	Result
January 27, 2012	AACTA Awards	Best Actor – International	Leonardo DiCaprio	Nominated
December 11, 2011	American Film Institute	Top 10 Films	J. Edgar	Won
January 12, 2012	Broadcast Film Critics Association	Best Actor	Leonardo DiCaprio	Nominated
January 15, 2012	Golden Globe Awards	Best Actor – Motion Picture Drama	Leonardo DiCaprio	Nominated
December 1, 2011	National Board of Review	Top Ten Films	J. Edgar	Won
December 18, 2011	Satellite Awards	Best Actor – Motion Picture Drama	Leonardo DiCaprio	Nominated
January 29, 2012	Screen Actors Guild Awards	Outstanding Performance by a Male Actor in a Leading Role	Leonardo DiCaprio	Nominated
January 29, 2012	Screen Actors Guild Awards	Outstanding Performance by a Male Actor in a Supporting Role	Armie Hammer	Nominated

== Historicity ==
In an interview on All Things Considered, Yale University history professor Beverly Gage, who later published a biography of Hoover, stated that the film accurately conveys that Hoover came to the FBI as a reformer seeking "to clean it up, to professionalize it," and to introduce scientific methods to its investigation, eventually including such practices as fingerprinting and blood typing. She praises DiCaprio for conveying the tempo of Hoover's speech. However, she notes that the film's central narrative device in which Hoover dictates his memoirs to FBI agents chosen as writers, is fictitious: "He didn't ever have the sort of formal situation that you see in the movie where he was dictating a memoir to a series of young agents, and that that is the official record of the FBI."

Historian Aaron J. Stockham of the Waterford School, whose dissertation was on the relationship of the FBI and the US Congress during the Hoover years, wrote on the History News Network of George Mason University, "J. Edgar portrays Hoover as the man who successfully integrated scientific processes into law enforcement investigations.... There is no doubt, from the historical record, that Hoover was instrumental in creating the FBI's scientific reputation." Stockham notes that Hoover probably did not write the FBI–King suicide letter to Martin Luther King Jr., as the film portrays: "While such a letter was written, Hoover almost certainly delegated it to others within the Bureau."

== See also ==
- Robert F. Kennedy in media
