= Clay County Savings Association Building =

- U.S. National Register of Historic Places
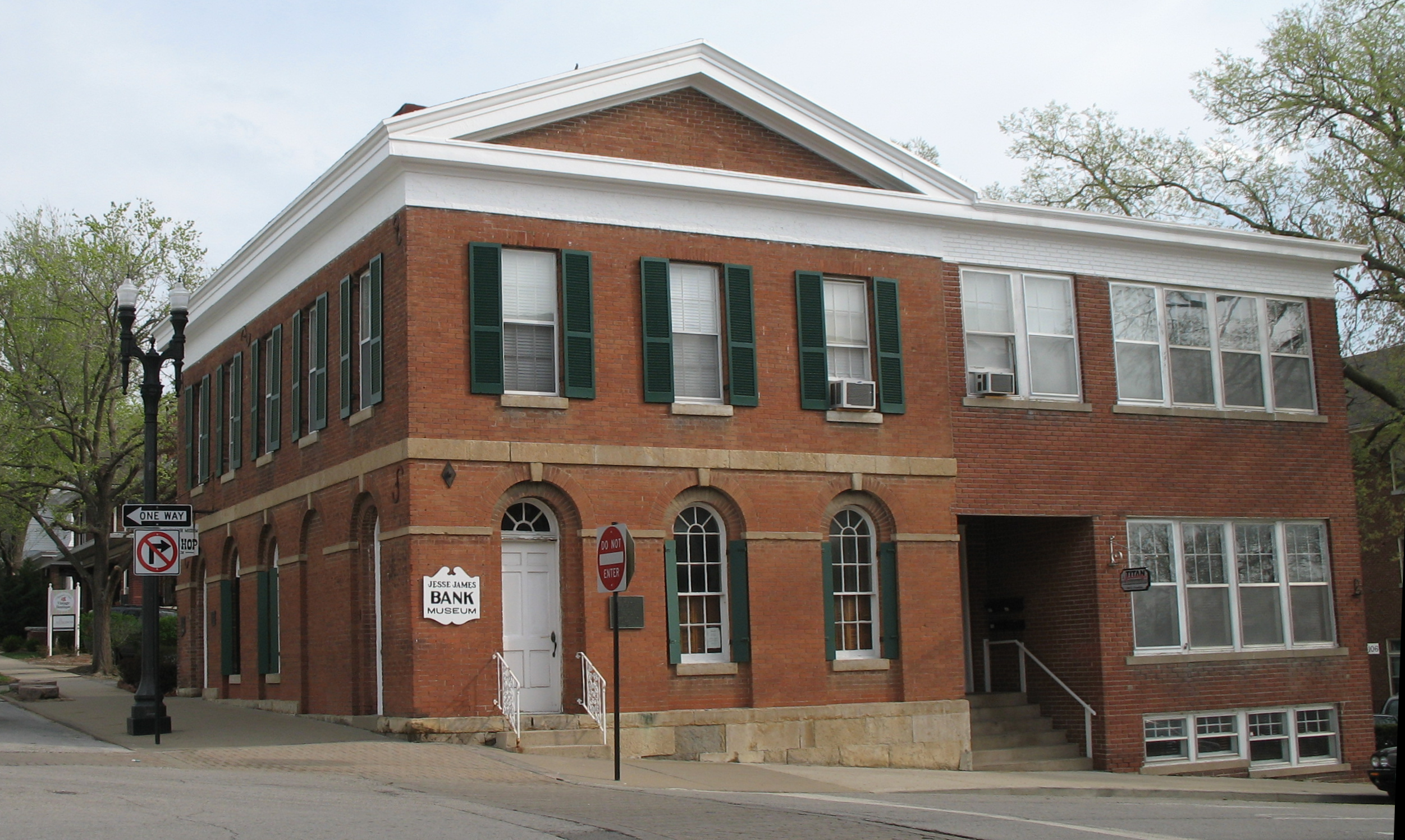
- Clay County Savings Association building

- Location within Missouri Location within the United States
- Location: Liberty, MO
- Coordinates: 39°14′49.58″N 94°25′8.36″W
- Area: less than one acre
- Built: 1859
- Architectural style: Federal
- MPS: Liberty MPS
- NRHP reference No.: 92001675
- Added to NRHP: December 28, 1992

The Clay County Savings Association in Liberty, Missouri, was robbed on February 13, 1866, making it one of the earliest documented daylight bank robberies. The robbers escaped with at least $60,000 (equivalent to $1,319,000 in 2025) and killed a bystander outside. The robbery is believed to have been conducted by a group of former Confederate guerrillas, possibly led by Jesse James or Archie Clement, which became known as the James–Younger Gang.

According to accounts of the day:

- On the afternoon of February 13, 1866, "some ten or twelve persons rode into town" and milled outside the Clay County Savings Association building.
- Two of the riders entered the bank, which was staffed only by the head cashier, Greenup Bird, and his son, William Bird, who was a bank clerk.
- After asking to change a $10 bill, the men drew revolvers and demanded money.
- William loaded the robbers' feed sack with gold, currency, bonds, and tax stamps.
- The two Birds were herded into the bank's vault, and the robbers left the building.
- As the robbers mounted to ride away, shots were fired. Accounts differ: problems with mounting a horse caused a "commotion" during which someone opened fire, or perhaps one of the gang fired "without any sort of provocation whatever". George "Jolly" Wymore, a 19-year-old student from William Jewell College who was across the street, was killed by a bullet.
- The gang rode away, pursued after a time by a posse of "outraged" townspeople who "could procure arms and horses".

The entire maneuver lasted no more than 15 minutes.

In total, the robbers collected at least $60,000. Reportedly they collected government bonds worth $42,000 to $45,000, $518 in tax stamps, gold, silver coins, and banknotes.

The bank offered a $5,000 reward for recovery of the money. Attempts to track the robbers were hindered by snow that covered their tracks. Articles in local newspapers implicated both former Confederate bushwackers and Kansas Redlegs of the crime. Later, some townspeople admitted to recognizing some of the robbers but withholding the information out of fear. The robbers were never caught, and no money was ever recovered. The Association eventually settled with creditors for 60 cents on the dollar and closed.

The building is located at 104 East Franklin Street, a block northeast of the Clay County Courthouse. It was built in 1859, and is a two-story, Federal style rectangular brick building with a gable roof. It was listed on the National Register of Historic Places in 1992.
