= Bank robbery =

Crime of stealing from a bank using violence or threat thereof

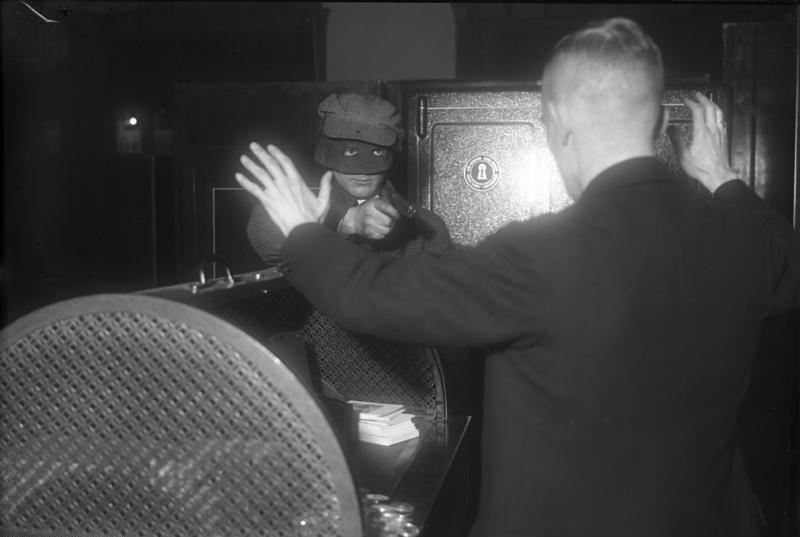
A masked man poses as a bank robber during a demonstration of a German device that protected cash and sounded an alarm during a robbery (1931).

Bank robbery is the criminal act of stealing from a bank, specifically while bank employees and customers are subjected to force, violence, or a threat of violence. This refers to robbery of a bank branch or teller, as opposed to other bank-owned property, such as a train, armored car, or (historically) stagecoach.

According to the Federal Bureau of Investigation's Uniform Crime Reporting Program, robbery is "the taking or attempting to take anything of value from the care, custody, or control of a person or persons by force or threat of force or violence or by putting the victim in fear." By contrast, burglary is "unlawful entry of a structure to commit a felony or theft."

== Overview ==
=== Places ===
Bank robberies occur in cities and towns. This concentration is often attributed to there being more branches in urban areas, but the number of bank robberies is higher than the number of branches.

This has advantages both for bank robbers and for law enforcement. In urban areas the transportation infrastructure is more highly developed, especially where banks tend to cluster near retail shopping areas and commercial districts. Such banks are highly profitable targets for robbers, who are then afforded a number of potential escape routes. Law enforcement benefit by being able to respond more quickly, and the odds of catching a bank robber on or near the scene is higher than other types of crime. This is because most bank robberies are reported very quickly while the crime is in progress; most bank robberies occur during daylight hours, have multiple witnesses and with modern technology often produce photographic images that can be distributed and used immediately to canvass the local area. Consequently, many bank robbers are caught the same day. The clearance rate for bank robbery is among the highest of all crimes, at nearly 60%.

The urban location of the crime also contributes to its repeat victimization profile, a measure of how quickly a crime victim will suffer a repeat of the original crime. One study carried out by the Home Office found that in England, one third of banks at which a robbery has occurred will be robbed again within three months, while the same study found that in Tallahassee, Florida, one quarter of robbed banks will suffer repeat robbery within a week, and over half of robbed banks will be robbed again within a month.

=== Characteristics ===
The Australian Institute of Criminology analyzed trends in bank robbery over a four-year period. Of the 808 bank robbery incidents between January 1998 and May 2002 in which the number of offenders involved in the hold-up was recorded, 55% were committed by lone offenders, 25% by pairs, and 20% by three or more robbers. Unarmed offenders accounted for 28% of robberies, caused the fewest injuries to victims (one percent of all victims' injuries), were the type of robber who most often used a note to threaten bank staff (46% of all their robberies), and failed most often in their robbery attempts (33% failure). Unarmed gangs inflicted the most injuries to victims (51%) and failed the least in their robbery attempts (6% failure). Armed robbers used a disguise more often compared to unarmed robbers, with armed pairs employing disguises most often (59%).

According to the Sourcebook of Criminal Justice Statistics injuries occur in about two percent and a death occurs in less than one percent of all U.S. bank robberies. Violent takeover bank robberies that are often portrayed in the media are rare. The majority of bank robberies taking place today are so-called "note jobs." These are usually accomplished by simply passing a written note to the teller demanding money. The idea is to attract as little attention as possible. In most cases, other customers present in the bank during a robbery are unaware of what is occurring. Standard bank policy is to avoid violence as much as possible, so they will normally hand over the money and try to obey the robber's demands. The robber usually makes away with cash, but in small amounts. According to British Bankers' Association data, in 2007 there were 106 attempted or successful robberies in Britain in which an average of 1.6 persons were involved. One third of attempts came up empty while the average haul for a successful attempt was equivalent to US$46,600. Yet 20% of the successes would later prove less than successful by virtue of the robbers being arrested.

== U.S. federal statute ==
Under federal law, bank robbery in the United States is defined, and made illegal, primarily by the bank robbery statute in 18 U.S.C. § 2113 states.

== History ==
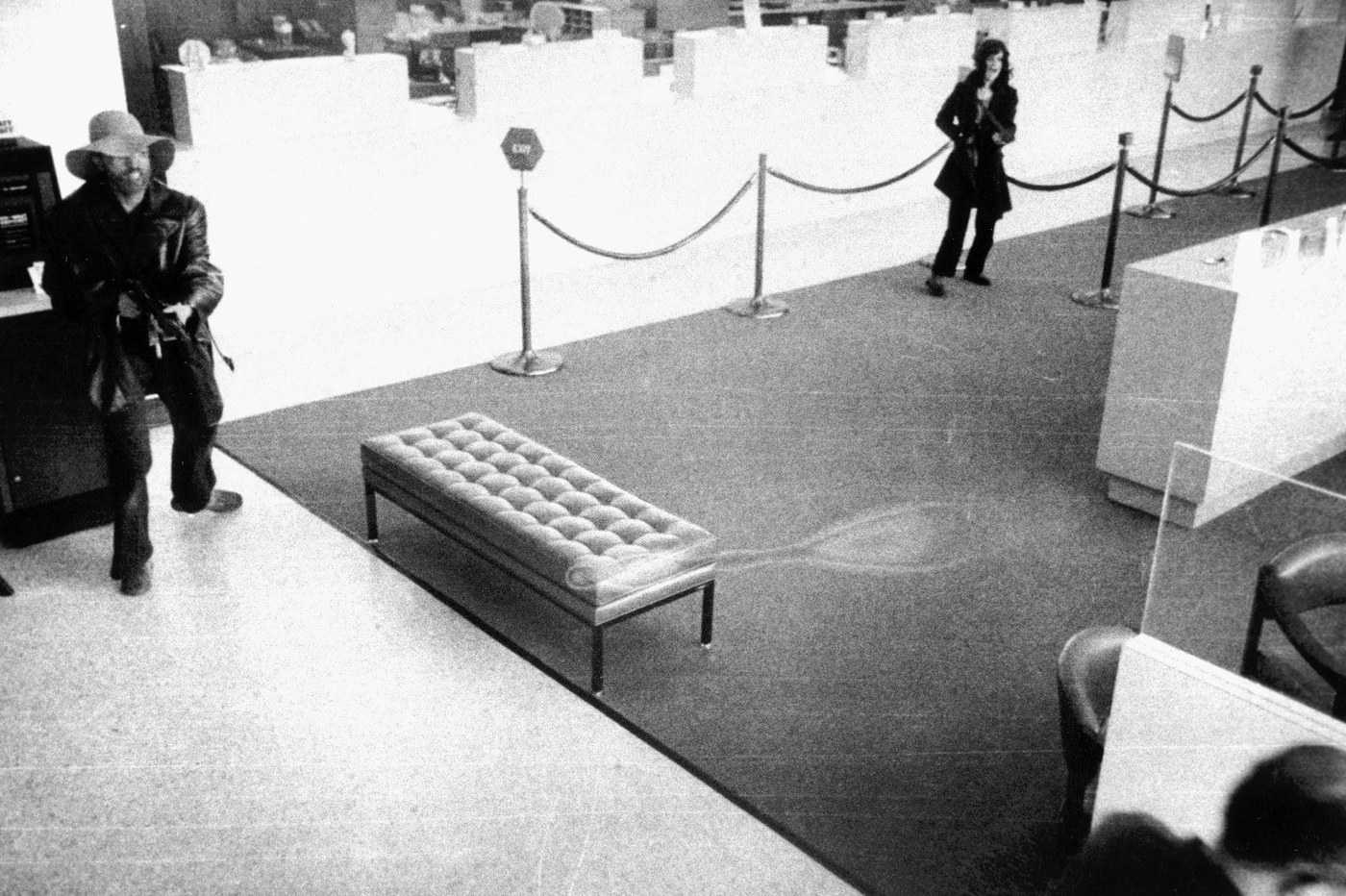
Patty Hearst takes part in the April 1974 Hibernia Bank raid with other SLA members.

=== Early examples ===
According to The New York Times and the Saturday Evening Post, the first bank robbery in the United States occurred in March 1831 (the 19th according to the Times, the 20th according to the Post). Two men, James Honeyman and William J. Murray, entered the City Bank of New York using forged keys. This allowed them to empty the vault of more than $245,000 in bank money. According to the Times, it cannot be confirmed if this was a robbery or a burglary. The Post later corrected this claim upon learning of a previous 1798 robbery of $162,821 from the Bank of Pennsylvania at Carpenters' Hall. The Carpenters' Hall theft also may not have technically been a robbery as there were no signs of force and the thief may have had a key.

On September 14, 1828, five men tunneled through a sewage drain in George Street, Sydney and stole approximately £14,000 in promissory notes and coins from the vault of the Bank of Australia. It has been described as the first bank robbery in Australia and also the largest in Australian history.

On December 15, 1863, Postmaster Edward Green walked into the First National Bank on Pleasant Street in Malden, Massachusetts, shot the 17-year-old bookkeeper, Frank Converse, and stole $3,000 in large bills and $2,000 in small bills. The directors of the bank offered a $6,000 reward for the arrest of the murderer. This has been described as the first armed bank robbery murder in US history.

On October 27, 1878, the Manhattan Savings Institution was robbed. It was the largest bank robbery in U.S. history.

The heist known as the 1907 Tiflis bank robbery in June 1907 in the Russian Empire resulted in 40 deaths, 50 injuries, and the "expropriation" of 241,000 rubles (approximately 3.96 million 2018 US dollars) by Bolsheviks organized by (among others) Vladimir Lenin and Joseph Stalin.

The first bank robbery in Denmark occurred August 18, 1913 in the bank Sparekassen for København og Omegn at Østerbro in Copenhagen. Two men, Danish salesman Lindorff Larsen and a German machinist Güttig, armed with revolvers, got away with 9000 Danish kroner. Güttig was arrested August 30 and Lindorff Larsen committed suicide after having fled the police.

=== Bank robbery on the American frontier ===
Bank robbery is commonly associated with the American Old West due to a few infamous examples and portrayal in fiction. The Foundation for Economic Education (FEE) in their research, found the scene of the Western bank-robbery to be generally a myth, identifying less than 10 definite bank robberies between 1859 and 1900 across 15 frontier states. Grunge.com pointed out that FEE's research was conducted before many states and the Library of Congress began publishing historical newspapers online, and while bank robberies in the Old West were still uncommon, there were many more than previously assessed.

On February 13, 1866, several men believed to be members of the James-Younger Gang robbed the Clay County Savings Association in Liberty, Missouri, shooting to death an innocent street bystander, 17-year-old student George Clifford "Jolly" Wymore, and escaping with $60,000. This was the first successful daylight bank robbery during peacetime in the US. Previous robberies such as from the banks in St. Albans, Vermont more than a year earlier were perpetrated by Confederate soldiers, which some historians consider to be not robberies proper but acts of war.

=== First motorized armed robberies ===
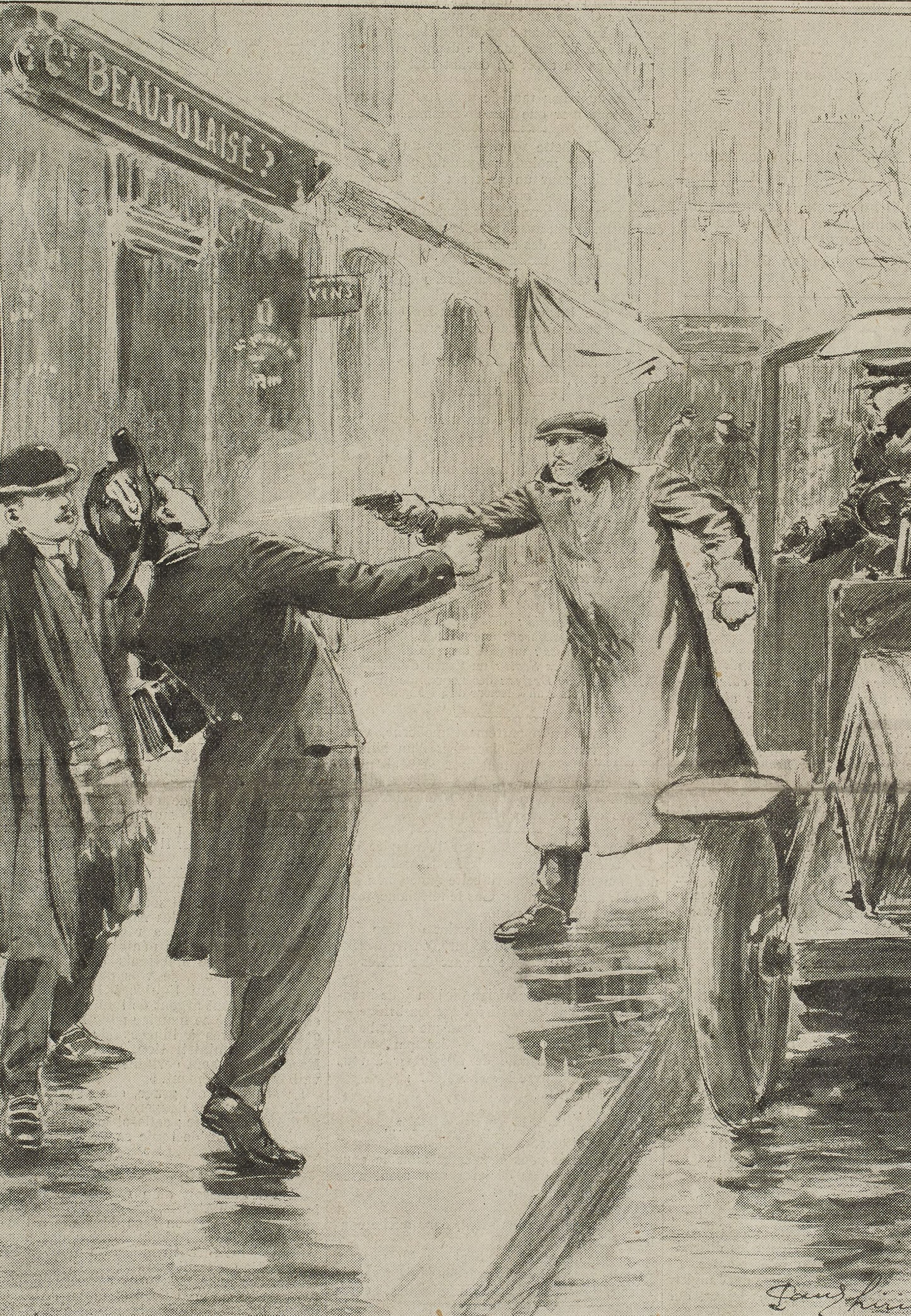
Representation of the Ordener attack by the illegalist anarchist Bonnot Gang, one of the first motorized armed robberies in history, L'Excelsior on 22 December 1911

The August 29, 1909 edition of The Rich Hill Tribune contained a front-page news story entitled "Bank Robbers in Motor Car" and according to which two robbers used a gun to rob the Valley bank of Santa Clara of $7,000. They then used a hired automobile to escape and were chased by police and a posse of citizens also in automobiles, eventually leading to their capture.

On December 21, 1911, members of the illegalist anarchist group the Bonnot Gang carried out the Ordener attack, using a car to reach the courier responsible for daily bank deposits. They confronted him, shot him down, and fled with the money. The Bonnot Gang would go on to repeat these motorized robberies in the following months. These were the first motorized robberies in history and significant events in the evolution of banditry.

=== Great Depression era and "Public Enemy" ===
The 1920s and 1930s saw a significant increase in bank robberies in the United States. This led to the formation of the Federal Bureau of Investigation (FBI) and the designation "Public Enemy" for significant wanted criminals. This era saw the rise of famous gangs such as the Dillinger Gang, the Barrow Gang (1932–1934), and the Barker–Karpis gang. Other famous public enemies included Pretty Boy Floyd (Public Enemy No, 1 in 1934) and Machine Gun Kelly.

=== First known use of camera footage to apprehend a bank robber ===
In 1957, security cameras installed at St. Clair Savings and Loan in Cleveland recorded the first film footage used to apprehend and identify bank robbers. The robbery occurred on April 12, when a 24-year-old male pointed a gun at a teller while his accomplice, an 18-year-old female, stuffed over $2,000 into a bag. A third accomplice drove the getaway car. The three were captured shortly after video footage of the robbery aired on national news.

=== Stockholm syndrome ===
In 1973, four hostages were taken during the Norrmalmstorg robbery in Stockholm, Sweden. After their release, the hostages defended their captors and refused to testify against them. This led to an academic interest in a phenomenon soon after referred to as Stockholm syndrome, wherein hostages, during captivity, paradoxically form a sympathetic bond with their captors as a survival strategy. Stockholm syndrome is a "contested illness" due to doubt about the legitimacy of the condition.

=== First known use of a helicopter ===
On February 16, 1984, more than $160,000 was stolen from the Merchants and Farmers Bank and Trust Co. in Leesville, Louisiana using a stolen getaway helicopter.

=== Historical bank robbers ===
George Leonidas Leslie (1842 – June 4, 1878) was involved in 80% of the bank robberies in the U.S. from 1869 to his death in 1878. He was involved in the Manhattan Savings Institution robbery.

Jesse James (September 5, 1847 – April 3, 1882) was one of the most notorious bank robbers in American history.

Ned Kelly (December 1854 – 11 November 1880), Australian bushranger and folk hero, pulled off a series of bank robberies in Victoria and New South Wales.

Herman Lamm (April 19, 1890 – December 16, 1930), The first "modern" bank robber, who developed techniques of surveillance and planning, such as casing and getaway maps, used by many latter stick-up men such as John Dillinger.

Bonnie Parker and Clyde Barrow, better known as "Bonnie and Clyde" (active February 1932 – May 1934), were an American couple who went on a crime spree during the Great Depression with their associates, the Barrow Gang. They captured the public imagination with their image as a wild young couple. Along with their gang, they were credited with only ten bank robberies, often making away with as little as $80. They were eventually ambushed and killed on the roadside outside Bienville Parish, Louisiana by a posse of Texas and Louisiana lawmen.

John Dillinger (June 22, 1903 – July 22, 1934) robbed banks in the Midwestern United States. Some considered him a dangerous criminal, while others idolized him as a present-day Robin Hood. He gained this latter reputation (and the nickname "Jackrabbit") for his graceful movements during bank heists, such as leaping over the counter (a movement he supposedly copied from the movies) and many narrow getaways from police. On July 22, 1934, FBI agents cornered Dillinger in an alley outside a movie theater in Chicago, Illinois, where he was shot and killed by multiple agents.

George "Baby Face" Nelson (December 6, 1908 – November 27, 1934) was a bank robber and former associate of John Dillinger. He is notable for having killed more FBI agents in the line of duty than any other person. He was killed in a shootout known as The Battle of Barrington, outside Chicago.

Edwin Alonzo Boyd (April 2, 1914 – May 17, 2002) was a Canadian bank robber and leader of the Boyd Gang, which pulled off a string of heists, including the largest in Toronto history.

Clarence Anglin, and brother John Anglin, the infamous Alcatraz escapees, robbed a bank in Alabama.

In the early 20th century, Willie Sutton (June 30, 1901 – November 2, 1980) was asked why he robbed banks, and he was famously reported as answering: "Because that's where the money is." This is, in fact, a quote invented by the interviewer to make the story more interesting. However, when asked, Sutton did write this statement and autograph it for his physician, so in a sense it is accurate.

== Prevention ==
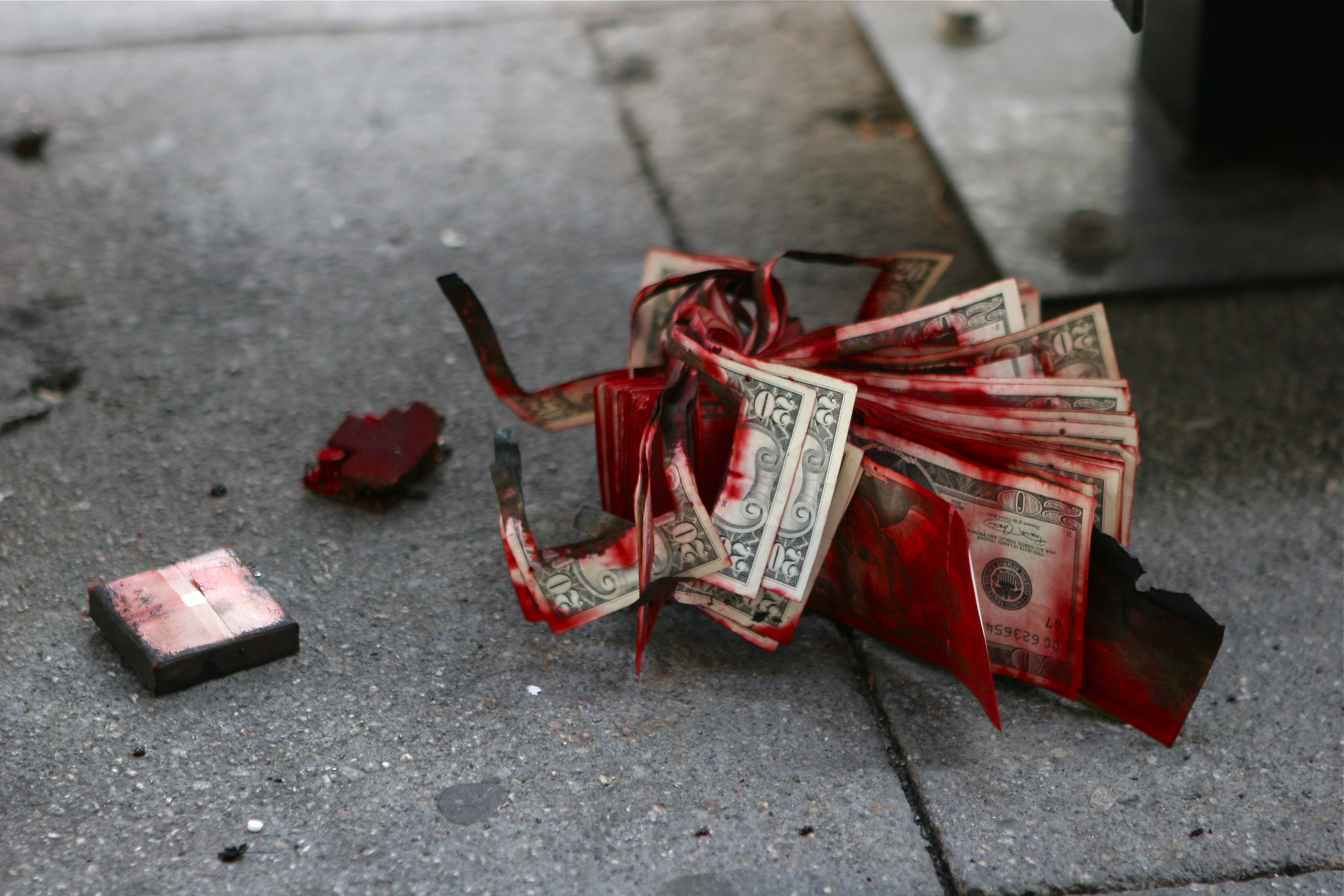
Expended dye pack after a Los Angeles area Bank of America robbery, January 2, 2008. This particular pack was concealed inside a stack of twenty-dollar bills.

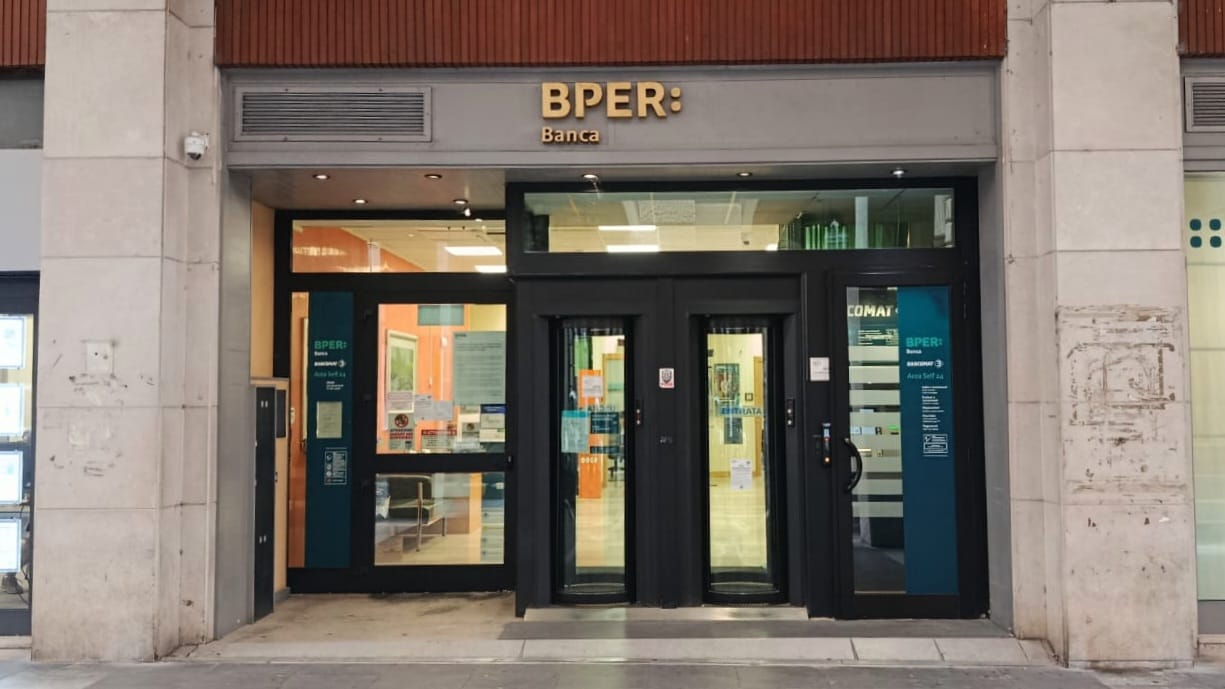
Bank orthotube with metal detector system to avoid unauthorized access by armed individuals in Chieti, Italy

In the 1920s, American banks added the security of alarm systems and concrete-reinforced, blast-proof vaults.

Modern banks have implemented modern security measures, like motion-sensing and high resolution color security cameras, time-locked heavy vault doors, silent alarms, exploding dye packs, bait money, and GPS tracking devices. Some banks supplement this protection with armed or unarmed security guards.

Today's biometric technology makes non-violent methods of gaining access, even by the most experienced safe hackers and code crackers, nearly impossible. Modern vaults and safes are also reinforced to the point that the amount of explosives needed to blow them open would likely create unwanted attention and run the risk of harming the building to the point of collapse. By their very nature, even the most impregnable vault or safe eventually needs to be able to be opened and closed by someone. To circumvent vault and safe security features, robbers often kidnap the bank manager, but that is not always a successful idea as banks have often removed the manager's ability to open the vault.

The police have new measures at their disposal to catch bank robbers, such as well-armed SWAT teams. Forensic identification techniques have also improved greatly; should a bank robber fire a gun, the police can trace the bullet to the exact firearm using ballistic fingerprinting. Martin Kemp, in a BBC documentary, once inquired on the effectiveness of an Uzi in a bank robbery, to which the firearms training instructor joked "that would be sixty-four pieces of evidence to convict you." The sawed-off shotgun, a common robbery weapon in the United Kingdom, Australia and New Zealand where handguns are difficult to obtain, is easily concealable but not particularly effective.

While it is not certain that the first time someone robs a bank they will be caught, if they continue to rob banks, they will most likely be caught. Few criminals are able to make a successful living out of bank robbery over the long run. Bank robberies are still fairly common and are indeed successful, although eventually many bank robbers are found and arrested. A report by the Federal Bureau of Investigation states that, among Category I serious crimes, the arrest rate for bank robbery in 2001 was second only to that of murder. Today most organized crime groups tend to make their money by other means, such as extortion, drug trafficking, gambling, prostitution, loan sharking, identity theft, or online scamming and phishing.

A further factor making bank robbery unattractive for criminals in the United States is the severity with which it is prosecuted. United States Federal Sentencing Guidelines for bank robbery gives long prison terms, which are usually further enhanced by the use or carrying of loaded firearms, prior criminal convictions, and the absence of parole from the federal prison system. As with any type of robbery, the fact that bank robbery is also inherently a violent crime typically causes corrections administrators to place imprisoned bank robbers in harsher high-security institutions.

== In film ==
Bank robberies are often a main plot in many heist films. Some of these films are based on the lives of historic bank robbers, such as Bonnie and Clyde (1967), Butch Cassidy and the Sundance Kid (1969), The Newton Boys (1998) and Public Enemies (2009) (based on the life of John Dillinger).

Dog Day Afternoon (1975), Set It Off (1996), and The Bank Job (2008) are based on actual bank robberies. Other notable but fictional examples include Point Break (1991), Heat (1995), Henry's Crime (2010), and The Town (2010). In The Town, bank robbery is described as an element of life for residents of Charlestown, a neighborhood in Boston. However, this is exaggerated and is disputed by residents of Charlestown, who describe it as outdated, as of when the film The Town was made. Up to the early 2000s, Charlestown was notorious for criminals whose specialty was robbery but also other lucrative crimes.

== See also ==
- Armored car (valuables)
- Convenience store crime
