= Eric Matheny =

Eric Matheny is an actor, screenwriter and co-founder of The Acting Center LA.

Raised in Los Angeles and Atlanta, Matheny started his career as a child actor appearing in national television commercials. As a teenager, he landed a starring role opposite Roger Mosely in the Southern Emmy Award-winning ABC Movie of the Week, Run Down The Rabbit. He appeared opposite Jeanne Tripplehorn in the ABC Movie of The Week A Perfect Tribute.

Matheny plays opposite Leonardo DiCaprio in the Clint Eastwood film J. Edgar playing J. Edgar Hoover's physician, Dr. Ferguson.

Eric starred opposite Pauley Perrette in a recurring role on the Fox's Jennifer Love Hewitt series Time of Your Life, playing Pauley's love interest.

Matheny has guest starred on numerous prime time hit shows including CSI, Without a Trace, and Buffy the Vampire Slayer.

Director Betty Thomas (Dr. Dolittle, John Tucker Must Die) cast Matheny as the lead in her Fox pilot That Guy.

Matheny has appeared in commercials for national brands including a series of spots and a Super Bowl spot for Bud Light, and Gillette ProGlide Fusion.

== Screenwriter ==
Eric Matheny, Isa Totah and Will Potter write America, a coming of age story about an Arab-American. Oscar-winning producer Mark Johnson (Chronicles of Narnia, Rain Man) is producing.

== Filmography ==
Year	Title	Role	Notes
2000	Screenland Drive	Pike	
2002	New Suit	Power Agent #2	
2011	J. Edgar	Doctor	
2013	Absence	Rick	
2014	The Road Within	Matt	
