= Cemetery John =

2012 non-fiction book by Robert Zorn

Cemetery John: The Undiscovered Mastermind of the Lindbergh Kidnapping is a non-fiction book written by American author Robert Zorn. The books investigate the potential identity of the person who became known as Cemetery John through testimony provided by the author's father.

The pseudonym "Cemetery John" was used in the Lindbergh kidnapping case to refer to a kidnapper calling himself “John” who collected a $50,000 ransom from a Bronx cemetery on April 2, 1932. A month earlier Charlie Lindbergh, the infant son of world-famous aviator Charles Lindbergh, had been kidnapped from the family home near Hopewell, New Jersey on March 1. However, the body of the 20-month-old boy was discovered in woods about 4 mi (6.4 km) from the Lindbergh estate on May 12.

== Summary ==
The identity of Cemetery John has eluded generations of investigators and researchers of the Lindbergh case. In his book, Robert Zorn contends that a German immigrant previously unknown to history named John Knoll was Cemetery John and the real mastermind of the crime. Robert Zorn's father, Eugene C. Zorn, Jr., had been the teenage neighbor of John Knoll in a German-American neighborhood in the South Bronx at the time of the kidnapping in 1932.

By December 1963, Eugene Zorn had become a nationally renowned economist. One day he came across an article about the Lindbergh kidnapping in True magazine while waiting to get a haircut in Dallas. The article contained details about the Lindbergh case with which he had been unfamiliar. These details triggered the memory of Eugene Zorn, who was certain that as a 15-year-old boy, he had unwittingly witnessed his older neighbor John Knoll with his younger brother, Walter Knoll, conspiring at Palisades Amusement Park in New Jersey with Bruno Richard Hauptmann, the man who went to the electric chair for the murder of the Lindbergh baby. Eugene Zorn recalled that although the three men spoke only in German, he heard the names "Bruno" (the name of one of the men) and "Englewood", the suburb where the Lindbergh family lived.
