= Bait money =

Bills with known serial numbers

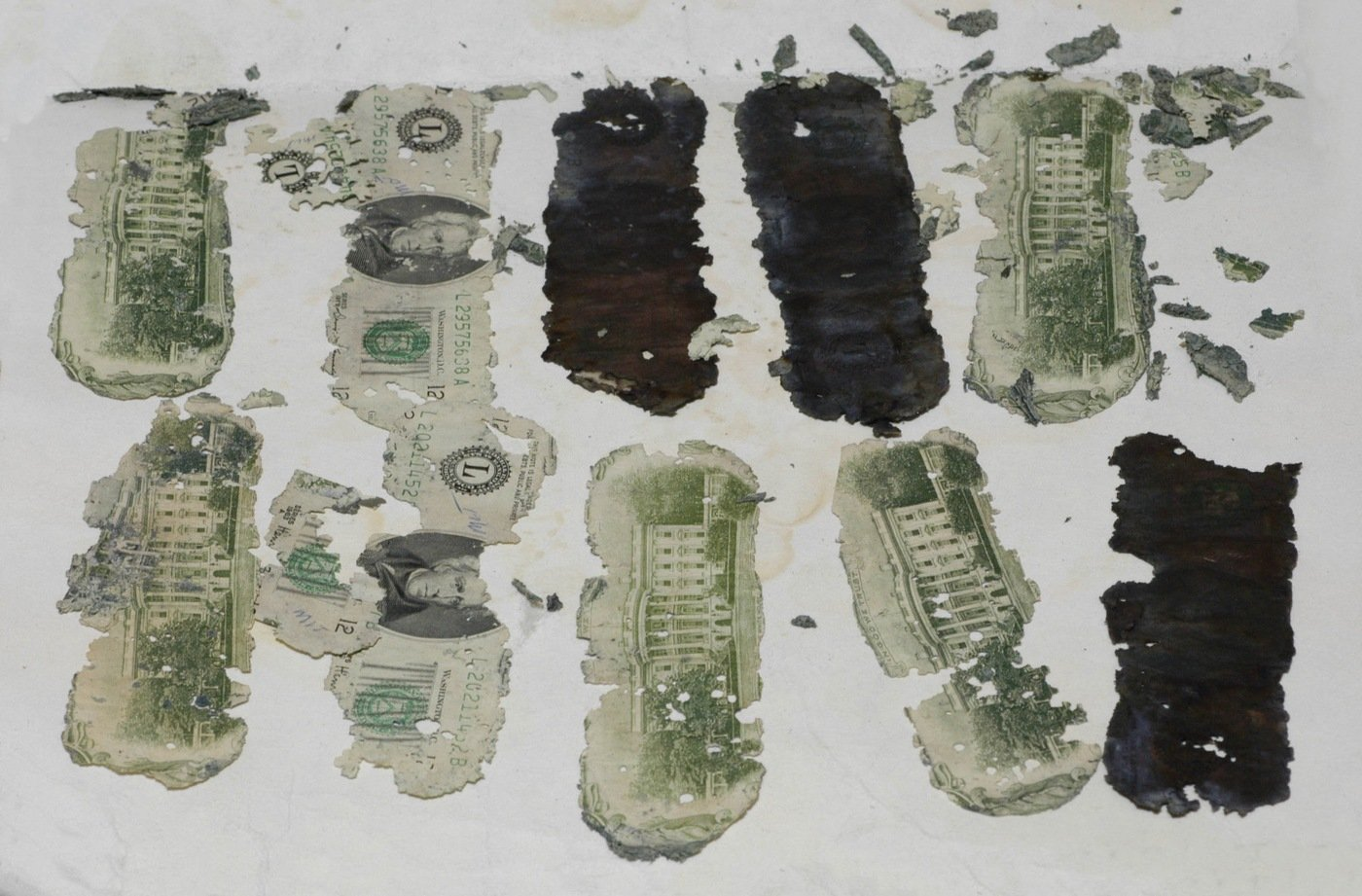
These $20 bills were recovered in 1980 by a young boy in Washington (state). The serial numbers of these bills matched those for bills given to D. B. Cooper (alias, real identity unknown) during a well-known 1971 airline hijacking.

Bait money or bait bills are bills with known serial numbers, used by banks to aid the tracing of bank robbers.

The serial numbers are recorded by the bank either by making a copy or by listing in a log book. During a bank robbery, if a robber has taken the bait money, details of this can be passed on to the police. If the money is found in the possession of someone, or used to purchase goods, this can make it easier to find the suspect of the bank robbery. Bait bills were used by investigators of the 1932 Lindbergh kidnapping in the United States.
