= Bruno Richard Hauptmann =

German-American executed for kidnapping and murder (1899–1936)

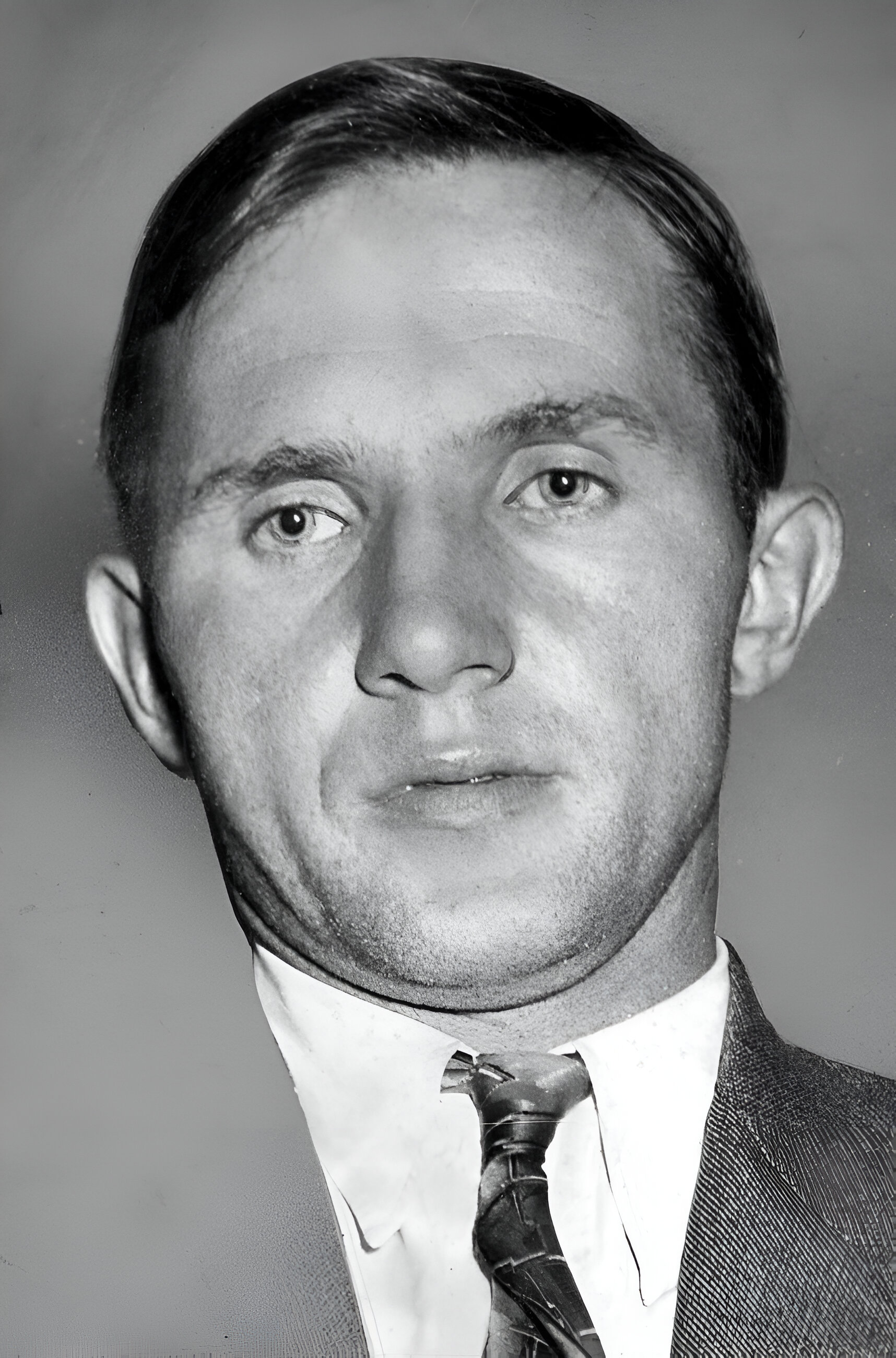
- Hauptmann in 1934
- Born: November 26, 1899; Kamenz, Saxony, German Empire
- Died: April 3, 1936 (aged 36); Trenton State Prison, New Jersey, US
- Occupation: Carpenter
- Known for: Being convicted for the murder-kidnapping of Charles Lindbergh Jr.
- Spouse: Anna Schoeffler (m. 1925)
- Children: 1
- Status: Executed by electrocution
- Conviction: First degree murder
- Penalty: Death

Bruno Richard Hauptmann (November 26, 1899 – April 3, 1936) was a German-American carpenter and criminal who was convicted of the abduction and murder of Charles Augustus Lindbergh Jr., the 20-month-old son of aviator Charles Lindbergh and his wife Anne Morrow Lindbergh. The Lindbergh kidnapping became known as the "crime of the century". He was executed in 1936 by electric chair at the Trenton State Prison. Both Hauptmann and his wife, Anna Hauptmann, proclaimed his innocence. In recent years, Hauptmann's guilt has been questioned by authors and researchers, and law enforcement behavior in the case has been widely criticized.

== Background ==
Bruno Richard Hauptmann was born on November 26, 1899, in Kamenz, a town near Dresden in the Kingdom of Saxony, which was a state of the German Empire. He was the youngest of five children. Neither Hauptmann nor his family or friends used the name Bruno, although prosecutors in the Lindbergh kidnapping trial insisted on referring to him by that name. At age 11, Hauptmann joined the Boy Scouts (Pfadfinderbund). He attended public school during the day while attending trade school (Gewerbeschule) at night, studying carpentry for the first year, then switching to machine building (Maschinenschlosser) for the next two years.

Hauptmann's father died in 1917. That same year, Hauptmann learned that his brother, Herman, had been killed fighting in France in World War I. Not long after that, Hauptmann was informed that another brother, Max, had also been killed while fighting in Russia. Shortly thereafter, Hauptmann was conscripted into the German Army and assigned to an artillery battery.

Upon receiving his orders, Hauptmann was sent to Bautzen but was transferred to the 103rd Infantry Replacement Regiment upon his arrival. In 1918, he was assigned to the 12th Machine Gun Company at Königsbrück. Hauptmann later claimed that he was deployed to western France with the 177th Regiment of Machine Gunners in either August or September 1918, then fought in the Battle of Saint-Mihiel. Hauptmann also claimed that he was gassed in September or October 1918, and that he was struck in the helmet by shrapnel from shelling, knocking him out so that he was left for dead. When Hauptmann came to, he crawled back to safety and was back on duty that evening.

After the war, Hauptmann and a friend used a pistol to rob two women transporting food. His other charges include burgling a mayor's house with the use of a ladder. Released after three years in prison, Hauptmann was arrested three months later on suspicion of additional burglaries. Hauptmann illegally entered the United States by stowing away on an ocean liner. Landing in New York City in November 1923, the 24-year-old Hauptmann was protected by a member of the established German community and worked as a carpenter. He married a German waitress, Anna Schoeffler (1898–1994), in 1925 and became a father eight years later. Hauptmann was known to be very secretive; Anna did not know his first name was Bruno until his arrest.

== Lindbergh kidnapping ==
=== Crime and investigation ===
On the evening of March 1, 1932, Charles Lindbergh Jr., 20-month-old son of aviator Charles Lindbergh, was kidnapped from Highfields, New Jersey; a homemade ladder was found under the window of the child's room. A ransom note demanded $50,000 (equivalent to $1.18 million in 2025). John F. Condon delivered the requested money, but the infant's body was found on May 12 in woods 4 miles (6.4 km) from the family's home. The death was ascribed to a blow to the head, which some have theorized occurred accidentally during the abduction. The ransom bills became increasingly used, and NYPD officer James J. Finn began to map the places where the bills were used. Upon receiving a new report of a location, Finn would quickly interview whoever had been given the bill.

On September 15, 1934, a bank teller realized that the serial number on a $10 gold certificate deposited by a gas station was on the list of Lindbergh ransom bills. On the bill's margin, the attendant, who found the certificate suspicious, had written the license plate number of the customer's car, which turned out to be Hauptmann's. He was placed under surveillance by the New York City Police Department, New Jersey State Police, and the FBI. On September 19, Hauptmann realized that he was being watched and attempted to escape, speeding and running through red lights. Hauptmann was arrested by Finn after finding himself blocked by a truck on Park Avenue just north of Tremont Avenue in the Bronx.

=== Trial ===
Hauptmann's trial was dubbed the "Trial of the Century", while he was named "The Most Hated Man in the World". Evidence against Hauptmann included $14,600 of the ransom money having been found in his garage, testimony alleging handwriting and spelling similarities to that found on the ransom notes, testimony that lumber used in constructing the ladder probably originated in Hauptmann's house, Condon's address and telephone number having been found written on the inside of one of Hauptmann's closets, and what appeared to be a hand-drawn sketch of a ladder found in one of Hauptmann's notebooks. Experts retained by the defense were never called to testify.

The trial began on January 3, 1935, and lasted until February 13. During the trial, Hauptmann was identified as the man who received the ransom money, the man who had spent some of the ransom gold certificates, and as a man seen near the Lindbergh home on the day of the kidnapping. He had been absent from work on the day of the ransom payment and had quit his job two days later. Hauptmann's attorney, Edward J. Reilly, argued that the evidence against Hauptmann was entirely circumstantial, as no reliable witness had placed Hauptmann at the scene of the crime, nor were his fingerprints found on the ladder, the ransom notes, or anywhere in the nursery. However, Hauptmann was convicted and immediately sentenced to death. His appeals failed, though his execution was stayed twice while New Jersey Governor Harold G. Hoffman reviewed the case.

=== Execution ===
On April 3, 1936, Hauptmann was executed in the electric chair at the New Jersey State Prison. Reporters present said that he made no statement. Hauptmann's spiritual advisor said that Hauptmann told him, before being taken from his cell, "Ich bin absolut unschuldig an den Verbrechen, die man mir zur Last legt" ("I am absolutely innocent of the crimes I am accused of"). Hauptmann's widow, Anna, had his body cremated. Two Lutheran pastors conducted a private memorial service in German. A crowd of some 2,000 gathered outside.

=== Guilt questioned ===
Several books have been written proclaiming Hauptmann's innocence. In 1974, Anthony Scaduto wrote Scapegoat, which took the position that Hauptmann was framed and that the police withheld and fabricated evidence. This led to further investigation, and in 1985, Scottish journalist Ludovic Kennedy published The Airman and the Carpenter, in which he argued that Hauptmann had not kidnapped and murdered Lindbergh Jr. These and other books criticize the police for allowing the crime scenes to become contaminated, Lindbergh and his associates for interfering with the investigation, Hauptmann's trial lawyers for ineffectively representing him, and the reliability of the witnesses and physical evidence presented at the trial. Kennedy in particular questioned much of the evidence, such as the origin of the ladder and the testimony of many of the witnesses. Skeptics pointed to various items of evidence that they claim was misrepresented at the trial, such as a scrawled phone number on a board in his closet, which was the number of the man who delivered the ransom, John F. Condon. According to some accounts, a reporter admitted he had written the number himself. They also claim that police and investigators intimidated witnesses, planted or falsified evidence, and ignored exculpatory evidence.

Another point of contention was that neither Lindbergh nor the go-between who delivered the ransom, Condon, initially identified Hauptmann as the recipient. In her book about another high-profile trial of the period, that of "trunk murderess" Winnie Ruth Judd, investigative reporter Jana Bommersbach argued that as was the case with Judd's trial, the press created such an atmosphere of prejudice against Hauptmann that he could not have received a fair trial. According to Bommersbach, crime reporters of the time often acted as "judge and jury", covering cases in a manner that would have been considered "supermarket sleaze" by today's standards.

==== Widow's campaign ====
For more than 50 years, Hauptmann's widow fought with the New Jersey courts without success to get the case re-opened. In 1982, the then 82-year-old Anna Hauptmann sued the State of New Jersey, various former police officers, the Hearst newspapers that had published pre-trial articles insisting on Hauptmann's guilt, and former prosecutor David T. Wilentz (then 86) for over $100 million in wrongful-death damages. She claimed that the newly discovered documents proved misconduct by the prosecution and the manufacture of evidence by government agents, all of whom were biased against Hauptmann because he happened to be of German ethnicity. In 1983, the United States Supreme Court refused her request that the federal judge considering the case should be disqualified because of judicial bias, and in 1984, the judge dismissed her claims. In 1990, New Jersey governor James Florio declined her appeal for a meeting to clear Hauptmann's name. Anna Hauptmann died on October 10, 1994.

== See also ==
- J. Edgar (film)
- Presumption of guilt
