= George Floyd protests in New Jersey =

2020 civil unrest after the murder of George Floyd

- Part of George Floyd protests
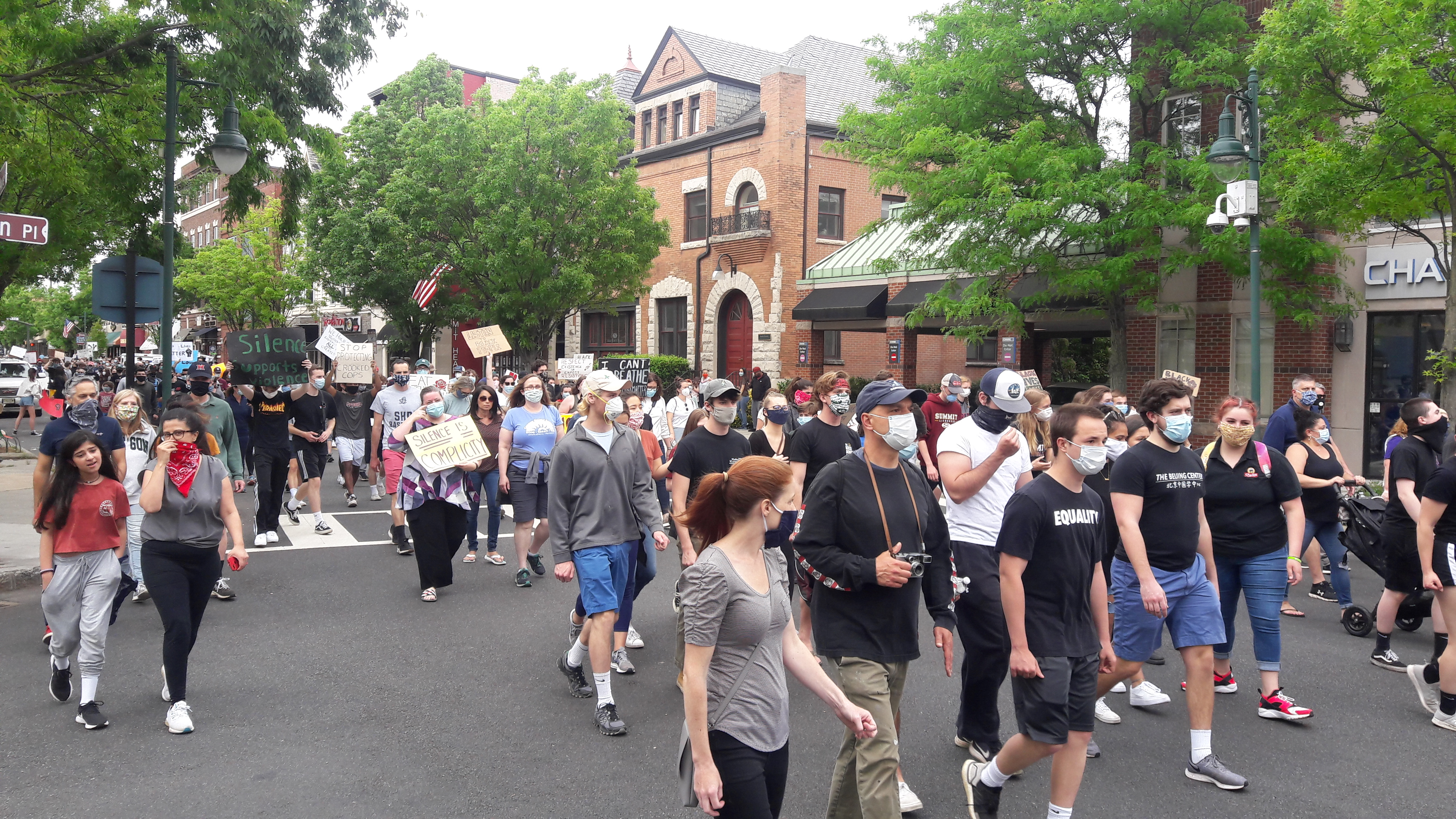
- Protest in Summit, New Jersey on June 2
- Date: May 30 – July 2, 2020 (1 month and 2 days)
- Location: New Jersey, United States
- Caused by: Police brutality; Institutional racism against African Americans; Reaction to the murder of George Floyd; Economic, racial and social inequality
- Status: Concluded

Cities in New Jersey in which a protest with about 100 or more participants was held

Following the murder of George Floyd, an unarmed black man in Minneapolis, Minnesota on May 25, 2020, protests erupted across the United States and around the world. Dozens of protests, several involving thousands of protesters, were held in New Jersey. Unlike in other areas of the country, protests in New Jersey were mainly peaceful. This was attributed to relatively good community-police relations, memories of the race riots of 1967, and activist leadership maintaining focus on systemic racism. After protests in Trenton and Atlantic City grew violent on May 31, curfews were set for the first time. Residents of Atlantic City helped clean up damage after the protests turned destructive.

On June 2, 2020, Attorney General Gurbir Grewal announced expanded utilization of a use-of-force database, proposed a licensing program for law enforcement, and other initiatives.

== Demonstrations ==
=== Asbury Park ===
Hundreds protested outside the Asbury Park Post Office from 5 pm to 8 pm on June 1. The city announced a curfew starting at 8 pm that same night.

=== Atlantic City ===
About 100 people protested near Tanger Outlets on May 31. The event began peacefully, but soon turned into "criminal activity" as stores were looted and damaged. A citywide curfew from 8 p.m. to 6 a.m. was imposed.

On June 6, hundreds gathered at Atlantic City Hall and marched down Atlantic Avenue.

=== Barnegat ===
On June 7, approximately 250 protesters marched from Fred Watts Gazebo Park through Barnegat Boulevard and Route 9 to the Little League complex for an event called Barnegat Walk for Peace. Protesters shouted “No Justice, No Peace,” “Black Lives Matter” and “Say His Name. George Floyd!”

=== Bayonne ===
On June 7, about 1,000 people came together, marched, and kneeled in Stephen R. Gregg Park. The protest also included a celebration of “Black Bayonne,” which included music and poetry from speakers.

=== Bedminster ===
On June 13, around 100 protesters gathered in support of Black Lives Matter at a major intersection near Trump National Golf Club Bedminster where the President was spending the weekend.

=== Bernardsville ===
On June 6, more than a thousand marched against racial injustice from Bernards High School through downtown Bernardsville to shut down Route 202 and then to place flowers at the base of the statue of late Congresswoman Millicent Fenwick.

=== Bordentown ===
On May 31, over 100 protesters gathered at an intersection in Bordentown City for a candlelight vigil and rally to show that “all lives cannot matter until black lives matter.”

=== Brick ===
On June 8, about 300 protesters gathered for a protest near Windward Beach Park.

=== The Caldwells ===
On June 2, more than 1,500 protesters gathered for a peace rally and marched from Grover Cleveland Park to the gazebo near the Police Station and Municipal Building in West Caldwell. The demonstration was organized by several local teenagers.

=== Camden ===
Hundreds demonstrated in a peaceful march to protest police brutality in the city on May 30. Camden County Police marched alongside demonstrators. The police chief helped hold a "Standing in Solidarity" banner at the front of the march.

=== Cape May ===
On June 5, Cape May County NAACP hosted a protest at Superior Court, 9 N. Main St, Cape May Court House.

=== Carteret ===
On June 4, a "Carteret Community Unity Walk for Peace" marched from Carteret Middle School to the Noe Street and Civic Center Parks. The event was ostensibly organized by two college students who later claimed that Mayor Dan Reiman inappropriately claimed credit for the event. Reiman's police officer brother was acquitted of pummeling a black teenager in 2019.

=== Cherry Hill ===
On June 2, a protest was held at the Cherry Hill Mall.

On June 5, hundreds of people protested by symbolically lying in the street for nearly nine minutes, blocking traffic on Haddonfield Road nearby the Cherry Hill Mall.

=== Clark ===
On June 12, about 50 protesters marched from Greenfield Madison Avenue Park in Rahway to the Clark Municipal Building where they called on Clark Mayor Sal Bonaccorso to apologize for remarks stating "I am pro-black for all the good black people that I know in my life," and other off-color remarks. The mayor addressed the crowd, only saying that he was sorry if anything he said offended anyone.

=== Clifton ===
On June 2, over 400 protesters gathered at Clifton Town Hall before marching down Clifton Avenue and Main Avenue to Passaic City Hall.

=== Clinton ===
On June 4, hundreds of protesters marched through downtown Clinton before gathering for a Black Lives Matter rally at Gebhart Field. Funds were raised for the Innocence Project.

On July 2, hundreds more marched against police brutality along the same route and outside the Hunterdon Art Museum.

=== Cranford ===
On June 2, a protest occurred in Cranford. An estimated 5,000 people gathered for a peaceful protest at Nomahegan Park.

=== Denville ===
On June 8, more than 600 demonstrators joined a protest organized by Denville Voices Against Racial Injustice at McCarter Park in downtown Denville.

=== East Brunswick ===
On June 12, about 200 people protested at the township's municipal center.

=== Edison ===
Around 200 protesters marched down Oak Tree Road. Organizers spoke at the First Presbyterian Church of Iselin.

=== Elizabeth ===
On June 6, hundreds of protesters marched from City Hall to the Union County Courthouse. Among those marching was the mother of Eric Garner, who was killed by police officers in a similar manner to George Floyd.

=== Englewood ===
More than 1,000 people rallied in Mackay Park on May 30 before peacefully marching to the Englewood Police Station.

=== Flemington ===
On June 1, about 100 people protested at the borough park behind the historic Hunterdon County Courthouse. Mayor Betsy Driver posted on Facebook: "This event has not been issued a permit and the leadership behind it is unknown."

On June 6, around 1,000 protesters marched from the county justice building to the Old Hunterdon County Courthouse.

=== Florham Park ===
On June 20, about 1,000 protesters organized by Black Lives Matter Morristown and Wind of the Spirit marched from Madison High School to Emmett Park in front of the Florham Park Police Department.

=== Franklin ===
On May 31, hundreds of people protested organized by Melanated Minds of NJ in a march that began and ended at Franklin Middle School at Hamilton Street Campus in Franklin Township, Somerset County. On June 4, more than 500 people marched from Middlebush Park to protest in front of the Franklin Township Police Department.

=== Franklinville ===
On June 8, about 70 protesters marched in Franklin Township, Gloucester County past a group of counter-protesters with All Lives Matter and Trump signs who mockingly re-enacted George Floyd's murder, with one man kneeling on the neck of another. The mayor and police chief of Franklin Township condemned the display. The state Department of Corrections suspended an employee at Bayside State Prison who was confirmed to among the group and PBA Local 105, the New Jersey corrections officer union, issued a condemnation. FedEx fired an employee who participated in the counterdemonstration. Peaceful protesters returned to Franklinville on June 13.

=== Freehold ===
On May 30, about 35 people displayed signs along a highway in a demonstration called "March on Route 9".

On June 2, about 300 gathered at the Monmouth County Hall of Records on Main Street. The protest was coordinated with the Freehold Police Department, who declined to "take a knee" when the crowd chanted. Angry words were exchanged, but the protest remained peaceful.

=== Glassboro ===
On June 19, three hundred Rowan University students, staff and members of the public marched through the university's Glassboro campus on Juneteenth to honor police brutality victims and protest systemic racism and oppression. Demonstrators "took a knee" in silence for eight minutes 46 seconds while George Floyd's final words were recited.

=== Glen Ridge ===
On May 31, more than 100 protesters assembled together on a lawn on Ridgewood Avenue to protest the murder of George Floyd.

=== Glen Rock ===
On June 7, approximately 600 people marched from Main Line Station to Borough Hall, where they knelt in silence for eight minutes and forty-six seconds in honor of Floyd.

=== Hackensack ===
On June 4, hundreds of protesters gathered in front of the Hackensack courthouse.

On June 6, kayakers took part in a worldwide "paddle out" – a Hawaiian mourning ritual – for George Floyd and other victims on the Hackensack River.

=== Hackettstown ===
On June 1, about 50 protesters marched on Main Street between the Municipal Building and the Civil War Memorial. One counter-protester appeared.

=== Haddonfield ===
On May 31, more than 300 protesters marched along Kings Highway in downtown Haddonfield in protest of police brutality.

=== Highland Park ===
On June 2, more than 1,000 protesters marched through the borough to the Raritan Bridge and Highland Park High School to hear community leaders speakers.

=== Hightstown ===
On June 2, a Black Lives Matter protest marched from Hightstown High School to the center of town and back. Police officers "took a knee" when requested.

=== Hillsborough ===
On June 6, about 250 protesters demonstrated at the intersection of Amwell Road and Route 206, where they knelt in silence for eight minutes and forty-six seconds.

=== Hillside ===
On June 7, Governor Phil Murphy joined marchers in Hillside to support Black Lives Matter and protest police brutality and racism. Organized by a 16-year-old Westfield High School student, around 2,000 people rallied in Mindowaskin Park.

=== Hoboken ===
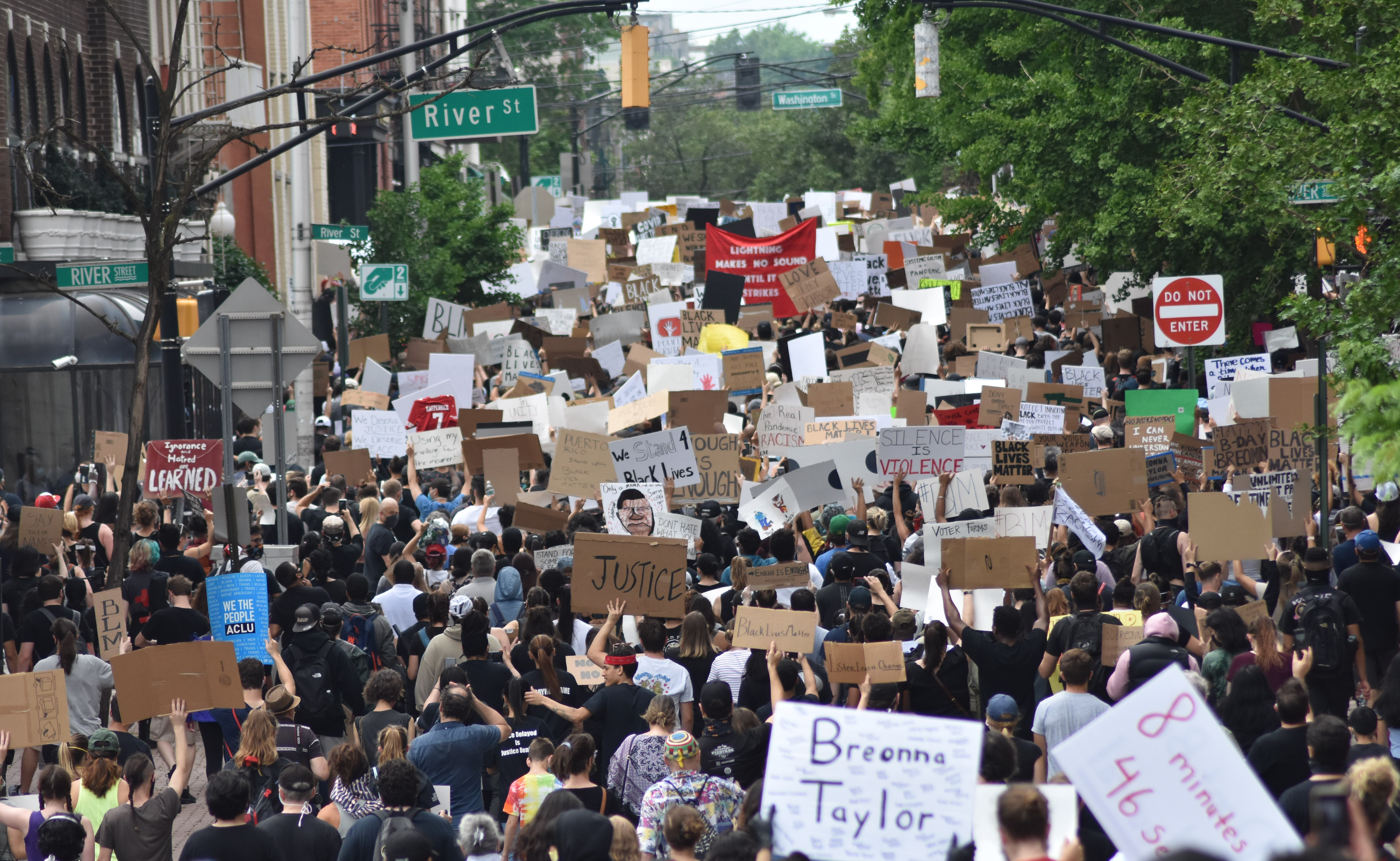
Protesters marching towards Hoboken City Hall on June 5

Protesters variously estimated at "more than 1,000" and "10,000" peacefully marched from Maxwell Place Park to Pier A Park on June 5. A group of protesters gathered at Hoboken City Hall. Most businesses had boarded their windows in fear; one business displayed a sign that read "United" and handed out free pizza and soda to demonstrators. Mayor Ravi Bhalla addressed the rally.

=== Hopatcong ===
On June 8, over 200 people of all races and ages organized a Black Lives Matter protest at Modick Park in Hopatcong.

=== Jersey City ===
On June 1, hundreds marched to the South District police precinct in Jersey City organized by the "Black Men United Coalition." Another organizer said that if looters can change the narrative surrounding protests around the country, "bad cops" can do the same for law enforcement.

In August, eight artists completed a large "Black Lives Matter" mural that took up an entire city block on Grand Street near a predominantly black area known as "The Junction".

=== Keansburg ===
On June 2, about 300 protesters gathered at the Keansburg waterfront to march to the police station for Black Lives Matter.

=== Lakewood ===
On June 6, hundreds of people participated in a protest in honor of George Floyd. The march had started at Lakewood High School and ended at Town Hall. Police officers had supported the protest and were on standby if any violent behavior were to occur.

=== Lambertville ===
On June 6, hundreds of Black Lives Matter protesters gathered in Lambertville to march and listen to speeches. The march proceeded up North Union Street to Mary Sheridan Park. After listening to the speeches, the protesters crossed the New Hope–Lambertville Bridge into New Hope, Pennsylvania in order to continue marching on South Main Street.

=== Little Egg Harbor ===
On June 14, around 100 people marched through the Mystic Island neighborhood in Little Egg Harbor Township. A counter-protester was charged with simple assault after video evidence showed him pushing a woman to the ground.

=== Livingston ===
On June 1, approximately 125 people gathered at the Livingston Town Center for "a peaceful protest in response to the recent murder of George Floyd, the persistence of police brutality directed at black Americans and the continuous and systemic oppression of black Americans nationally."

=== Long Beach Island ===
On June 6, hundreds of protesters crossed the bridge from Stafford to LBI carrying signs that read "Black Lives Matter" and "Justice for George Floyd."

=== Long Branch ===
On May 31, hundreds of protesters gathered at the Pier Village shopping center to chant and speak out about police injustice. At one point, they broke the chanting to kneel in silent unison in front of police.

=== Long Valley ===
On June 12, nearly 500 people attended a Black Lives Matter rally organized by two recent West Morris Central High School graduates in Long Valley.

=== Mahwah ===
On June 20, more than 200 people protested systemic racism according to the organizers Mahwah Alliance for Change.

=== Millburn ===
On May 31, approximately 150 protesters waved signs along Millburn Avenue.

=== Millville ===
On May 30, nearly 75 demonstrators gathered near Millville City Hall.

=== Monroe Township ===
On June 7, over 100 protesters in Monroe Township went to Thompson Park; a park shared by Jamesburg and Monroe. The protests were peaceful.

=== Montclair ===
On June 6, an estimated 1,000 people peacefully marched through the streets of Montclair and afterwards, in Crane Park, there were several people who spoke passionately to the crowd.

=== Morristown ===
On May 30, approximately 200 to 300 people drove and marched peacefully through Morristown and neighboring Morris Township.

=== Moorestown ===
On June 2, hundreds of demonstrators marched down Main Street chanting "No Justice! No Peace!" in Moorestown. Roads were blocked around noon on a Tuesday followed by speeches for the rest of the afternoon. Notable attendees included Congressman Andy Kim, State Senator Troy Singleton, the mayor of Moorestown, local clergy and a number of students.

=== Newark ===
In Newark, a crowd of some 12,000 protesters marched peacefully down Market Street on May 30 at a rally organized by "People's Organization for Progress."

Hundreds gathered on June 27 to paint "ALL BLACK LIVES MATTER" on Halsey Street and "ABOLISH WHITE SUPREMACY" on Dr. Martin Luther King Jr. Boulevard near the Essex County Courthouse.

=== New Brunswick ===
On May 30, about 300 protesters shouted "Black Lives Matter!" and "No Justice, No Peace!" at Feaster Park where the shooting of Barry Deloatch occurred in 2011.

=== Newton ===
On June 6, approximately 300 to 400 protesters gathered on the Newton Green after hundreds marched from Memory Park along Spring Street. A small All Lives Matter counter-protest was held across the green.

=== North Hudson ===
On June 6, hundreds of protesters marched through North Hudson. Elected officials in attendance included five mayors from around Hudson County, a Freeholder, two assembly members and Rep. Albio Sires.

=== North Plainfield ===
On June 6, hundreds of protesters march along Somerset Road and County Road 636 to raise awareness for the murder of George Floyd in North Plainfield. Speakers included Rep. Tom Malinoski.

=== Nutley ===
On June 7, about 600 people rallied together in Nutley's Yanticaw Park and listened to several speakers before having an 8-minute, 46 second kneeling moment of silence and then marching through the town.

=== Ocean City ===
On June 2, hundreds of protesters from Somers Point peacefully marched to the public safety building. Police spoke to the crowd, took a knee and joined them in nine minutes of silence. The march continued onto the police station, where protesters laid on the ground and chanted.

=== Paramus ===
On June 9, two hundred people joined for a march and speakers at Paramus High School. They planned on marching down Fairview Avenue, but were blocked by police and forced to turn back down Century Road to the school.

=== Parsippany ===
On June 2, nearly 3,000 marched from Parsippany High School to Veterans Park to demand justice for the murder of George Floyd. The protest was organized by Black Lives Matter Morristown and an immigrant rights group called Wind of the Spirit. The Parsippany-Troy Hills Township Superintendent of Schools initially refused permission for protesters to use the High School parking lot but changed his mind on the day of the protest.

=== Paterson ===
A rally intended for George Floyd on June 3 was attended by family members of Jameek Lowery, who died after an encounter with the Paterson police in 2019.

On June 13, another solidarity rally was held in front of the Paterson Free Public Library.

=== Perth Amboy ===
On June 6, thousands marched against police brutality and racism from Perth Amboy High School to Perth Amboy City Hall. Police officers participated by taking a knee.

=== Phillipsburg ===
On June 6, hundreds of protesters marched in "Walk With Us" rally for Black Lives Matter organized by local resident. The police chief, mayor, members of town council and a county freeholder took part.

=== Princeton ===
On June 2, thousands protested in downtown Princeton against racism and police brutality, and called for systemic change at an event that included speeches, chanting, and marching.

=== Rahway ===
On May 31, protesters held a rally at City Hall demanding more transparency changes in training and more minority representation at the police department.

=== Red Bank ===
On June 9, about 500 protesters marched from Marine Park down Broad Street toward Count Basie Field in Red Bank for a "Say Their Names" rally to celebrate/remember the lives of George Floyd and others who have died in police custody.

=== Ridgewood ===
On June 10, two thousand people marched from Ridgweood Station to the YMCA, where speakers included the Ridgewood Chief of Police, New Jersey Attorney General Gurbir Grewal, and the Bergen County Sheriff.

=== Rio Grande ===
On June 1, protesters met at the corner of Route 47 and Route 9 chanting “Black Lives Matter” and “I can't breathe." A scheduled protest was cancelled but 10 people showed up and the crowd eventually grew large enough to shut down the town's busiest intersection for several hours.

=== Rutherford ===
On June 7, a Black Lives Matter march and rally was held in Rutherford. The peaceful march began at Union School and ended with speakers at Lincoln Park. Hundreds attended.

=== Sayreville ===
On June 6, more than 300 people, organized by three Sayreville War Memorial High School graduates, protested in front of the Sayreville Municipal Building.

=== Somers Point ===
On June 2, protesters gathered in Somers Point and peacefully marched over the 9th Street Bridge towards Ocean City.

=== Somerville ===
On June 7, hundreds marched down Main Street for the second straight day of Black Lives Matter protests. Daily protests have taken place outside the offices of Rep. Tom Malinowski in Somerville. Small groups start there and walk through neighborhoods and major thoroughfares in the county seat.

=== South Brunswick ===
More than 500 protesters gathered at the Crossroads North Middle School in South Brunswick on June 2. The large group marched along Georges Road to Route 522 and back again.

=== South Plainfield ===
Approximately 300 protesters gathered at the Veteran's Memorial Park on June 8.

=== Summit ===
On June 2, more than 1,500 protesters showed their support for Black Lives Matter at a Middle School in Summit.

=== Teaneck ===
On June 5, hundreds of protesters blocked Route 4 in Teaneck for ten minutes before marching to the Englewood police station to protest police brutality.

=== Toms River ===
On June 2, about 200 protesters gathered at a shopping center on Route 37 and marched peacefully with police to the Ocean County courthouse.

=== Trenton ===
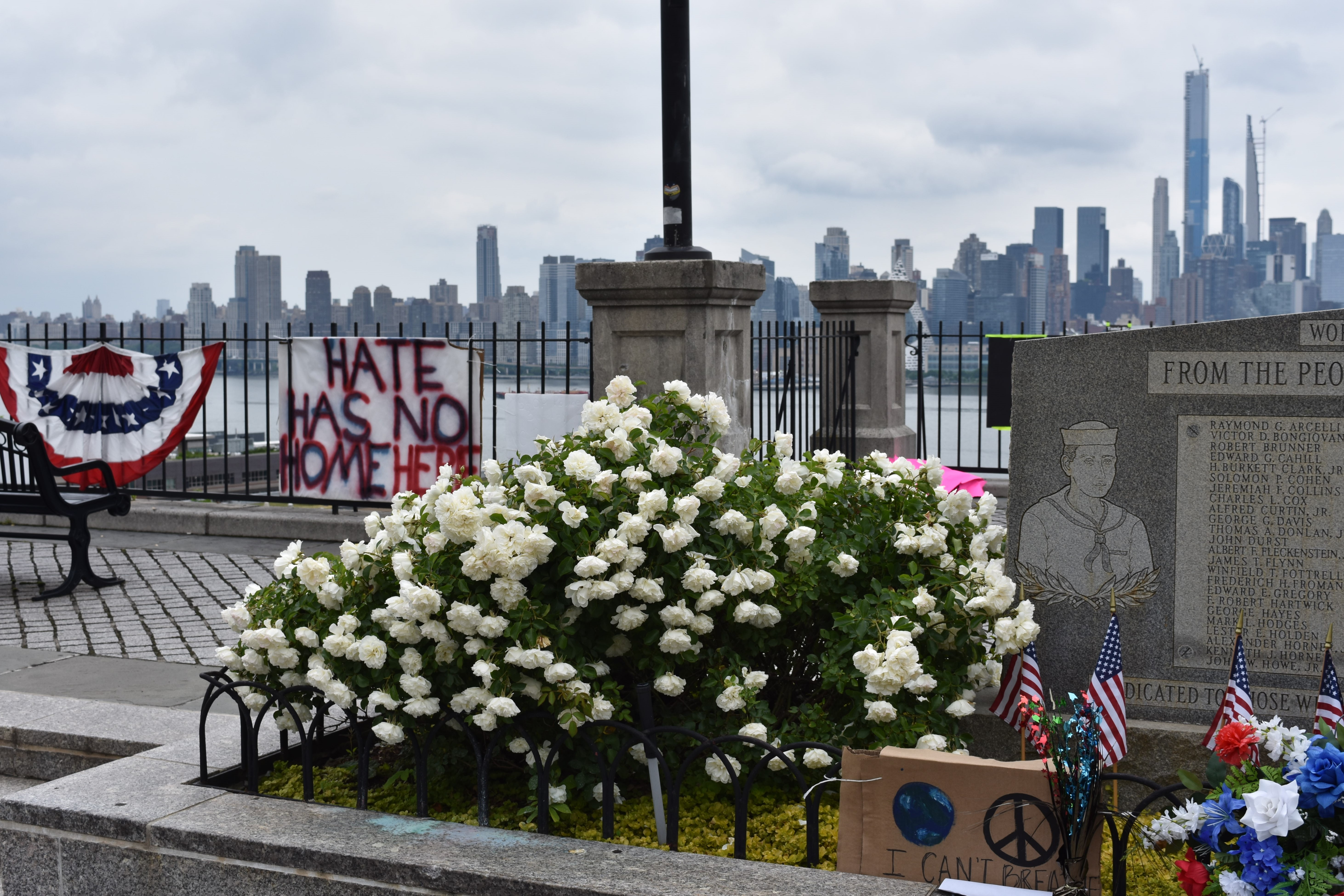
Protest signs at the World War I memorial in Weehawken

Several groups including Black Lives Matter gathered at the New Jersey Statehouse on May 30. Later that evening, violence and looting erupted in Downtown Trenton when various businesses were broken into and multiple police vehicles were set on fire or stolen.

=== Vernon ===
On June 6, a rally was held in Vernon Township, a 96% white township with an African-American mayor.

=== Vineland ===
On June 1, about 75 protesters marched through downtown Vineland ending in Landis Park where police officers joined protesters in taking a knee for eight minutes and forty-six seconds.

=== Wayne ===
Roughly 1,000 demonstrators gathered at the Wayne Township Municipal Building on June 6.

=== West Milford ===
On June 4, hundreds of protesters marched in West Milford.

On June 21, two dozen protesters gathered at the veteran's memorial outside Town Hall calling for justice for George Floyd and for the firing of a local police officer who allegedly made discriminatory comments online.

=== West Orange ===
On June 12, thousands of people gathered at West Orange Town Hall to protest against brutality and ask for police reform. A petition with seven points for police reform had gathered over 6000 signatures.

=== Wildwood ===
On June 5, Cape May County NAACP hosted a protest at Fox Park in Wildwood. Approximately 200 people attended the rally.

=== Willingboro ===
As of May 30, a lone man has come each day to a corner across from a mini-mall in his small Burlington County hometown holding a sign that says "Stop Black Genocide." He moved back home from Atlanta just to do this. He has been joined by others; on May 30, the number present was twelve.

A larger protest marched to the Willingboro Municipal Complex on June 2.

=== Winslow ===
A protest occurred in Winslow Township in Camden County.

=== Woodbridge ===
On June 2, a police dispatcher in Woodbridge was suspended and ultimately resigned for making a racist comment under a photo of a black boy at a George Floyd protest.
