= George Kittinger =

American politician

G. B. Kittinger
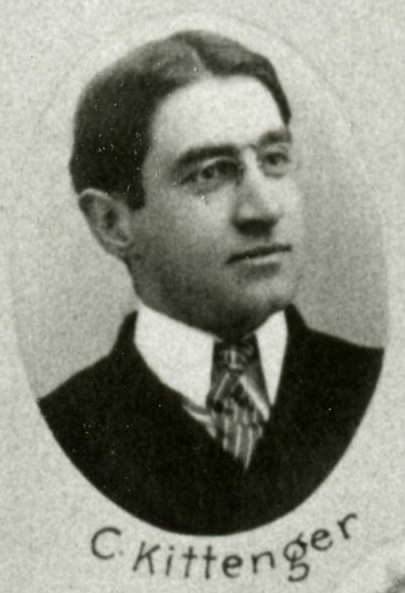
- Kittinger in 1895

Member of the Washington House of Representatives for the 40th district
- In office 1895–1899

Personal details
- Born: July 4, 1865 Flemington, New Jersey, United States
- Died: March 30, 1933 (aged 67) Seattle, Washington, United States
- Party: Republican

George B. Kittinger (July 4, 1865 – March 30, 1933) was an American politician in the state of Washington. He served in the Washington House of Representatives from 1895 to 1899.
