= Union Hotel (Flemington, New Jersey) =

Building in Flemington, New Jersey, United States

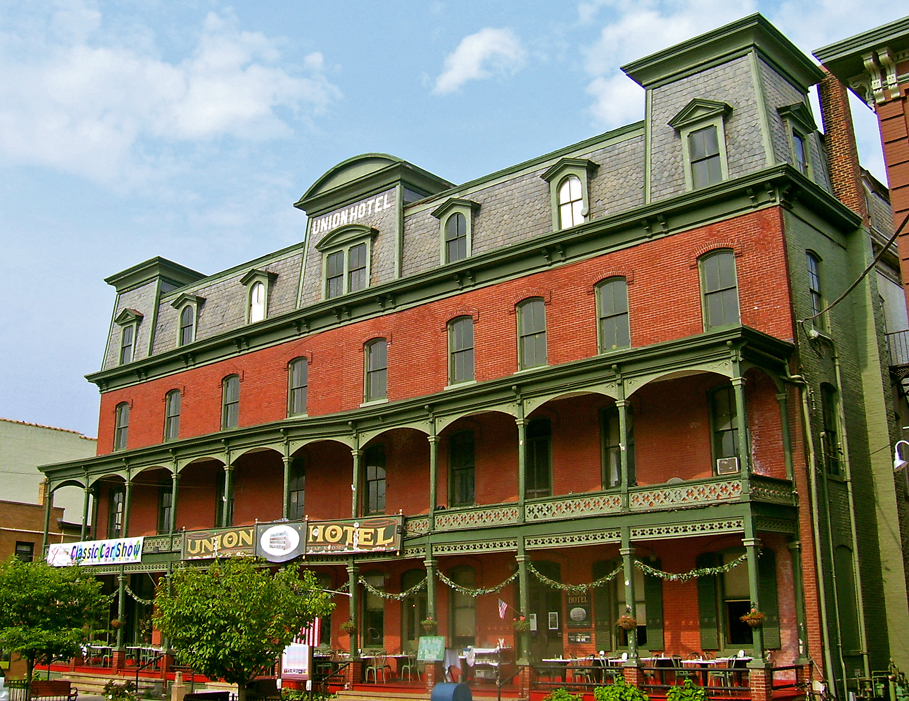
- The Union Hotel in Flemington, New Jersey (2006)

General information
- Status: Open
- Architectural style: Victorian
- Location: Flemington, U.S., 76 Main Street
- Coordinates: 40.5107°N 74.8587°W
- Opened: Original structure: 1814; Front facade: 1878; Redevelopment: 2026
- Renovated: 2026
- Owner: Flemington Center Urban Renewal LLC; Cust Investments

Design and construction
- Developer: Flemington Center Urban Renewal LLC; Cust Investments

The Union Hotel is a historic landmark located on Main Street in Flemington, New Jersey. It is a contributing property to the Flemington Historic District.

First constructed by Neal Hart in 1814, it served as a gathering place for well-to-do stagecoach passengers and socialites throughout the 19th Century, as well as many local characters and tourists visiting the area. The exterior of the front facade of the building dates to 1878.

It gained national notoriety in the early months of 1935 when the trial of Bruno Hauptmann for the kidnapping of Charles A. Lindbergh, Jr. was conducted directly across the street at the Hunterdon County Courthouse and members of the national media covering the trial all stayed at the hotel.

Decades later the property was purchased by new owners, renovated, restored, and converted into the Union Hotel Restaurant. The second and third floors (which once housed hotel patrons) were left empty and unoccupied, adding to the growing mythos surrounding the widely recognized Hunterdon County icon.

Murals created by Carl Ritz with the assistance of Kurt Wiese adorned the hotel. They were removed and preserved by the Hunterdon County Historical Society in 2011.

== 2008 closure ==
In July 2008, managing partner John Blanos announced that the Union Hotel Restaurant would sell its liquor license but remain open. However, in August he announced that the restaurant would close, and that the liquor license would be sold to Bensi, an Italian chain restaurant soon to open elsewhere in Flemington. At a special Flemington Borough Council meeting in September 2008, the transfer of the liquor license was rejected, but Blanos nonetheless stated that the restaurant would close immediately and that he was negotiating with a potential buyer. Blanos said that the Union Hotel had been steadily losing money since he and his partners bought it in 1999.

== Redevelopment ==
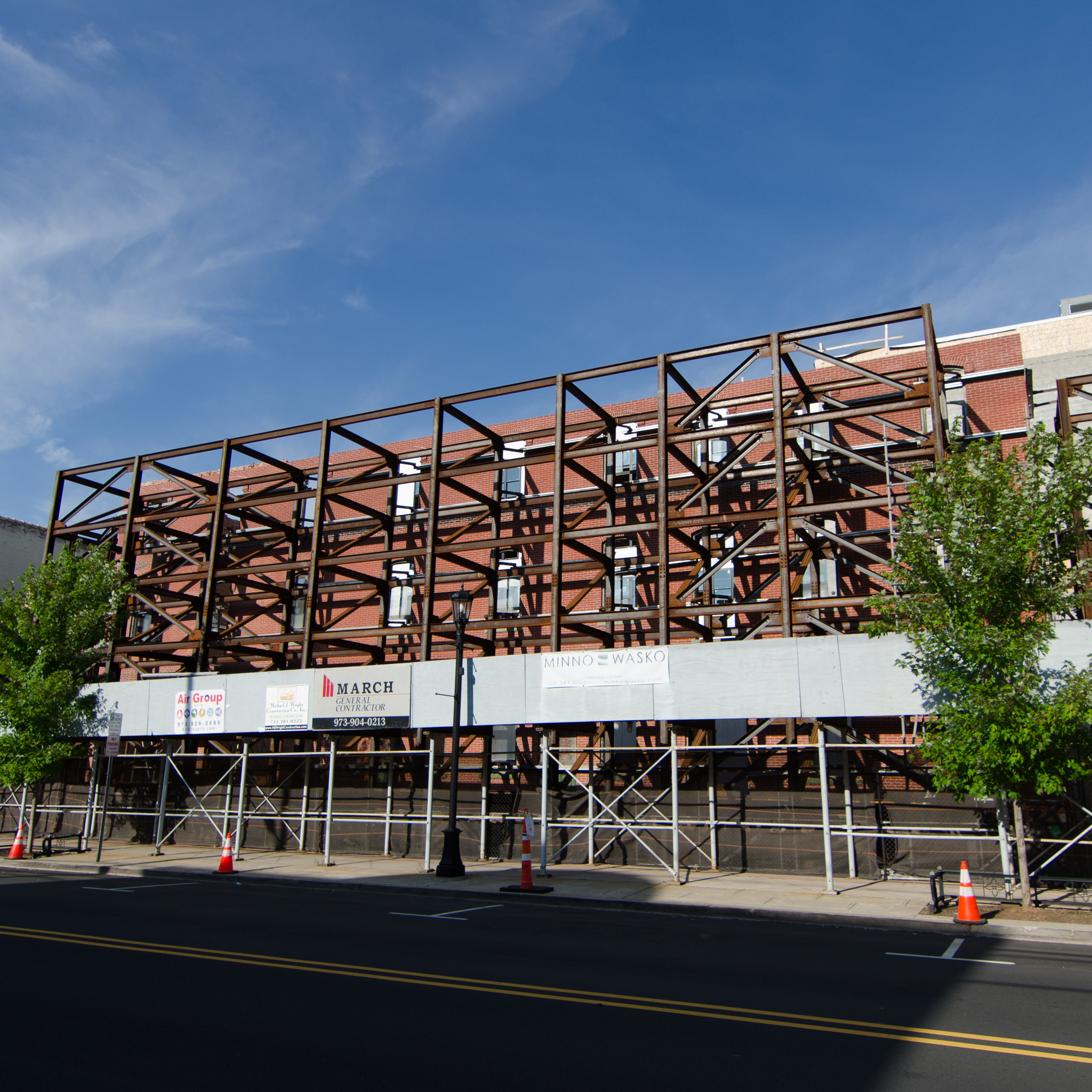
Union Hotel under construction in June 2024. Steel scaffolding supports the front facade and two walls being preserved.

In November 2012, the Flemington Borough Council selected Flemington Union Hotel LLC to revive and restore the once prominent Union Hotel on historic Main Street. Flemington Union Hotel LLC's principals Matt McPherson and Liam Burns envisioned to revive the Union Hotel as a 50 to 55-room hotel that would expand into the building next door at 78 Main St. The plan called for adding a ballroom on the back and establishing a steakhouse and a pub on the ground floor. In June 2015, they were found to be in default of the redevelopment agreement and removed as developers.

In February 2016, Flemington Borough Council selected Jack Cust as the new developer. His plans included demolishing the Union Hotel and replacing it with a new hotel, restaurants, retail space, underground parking, apartments, and a college. This caused much controversy in and around Flemington. In March, Flemington Borough council approved the plans.

In September 2016, The Friends of Historic Flemington, a local group opposed to the redevelopment, filed two lawsuits against Flemington Borough. One alleging that the process to designate the hotel as an area in need of redevelopment was not properly followed and that the Borough failed to follow New Jersey's Open Public Meetings Act. The other alleging that the Borough failed to properly respond to requests for documents under New Jersey's Open Public Records Act.

In March and April 2017, the Friends of Historic Flemington filed two additional lawsuits against the town.

In May 2017, plans to demolish the hotel were scuttled and a new plan to preserve the facade of the hotel and the Deats Building was introduced.

In September 2020, Jack Cust unveiled another revision of the plans reducing the height of the building from 87ft to 63ft, preserving the Potting Shed building, removing the medical and educational facilities, and reducing the number of apartments from 222 to 206.

In November 2020, work to stabilize the old hotel began.

In September 2021, the last remaining lawsuit between the developer and the Friends of Historic Flemington was settled resulting in adoption of the September 2020 plan.

By April 2022, the demolition phase of the project had been completed.

The new hotel and first restaurant, Jersey Prime Steakhouse, opened on September 15th, 2026.

== Legends ==
The belief that the hotel was haunted is quite prevalent, though few members of the public were ever allowed access to levels above the dining hall where a few rooms were used by management for business purposes. Ghost sightings or poltergeist incidents had been reported by employees. One reported seeing a pair of shoes walk up a staircase all by themselves. Others had told of hearing or seeing small children in rooms despite the absence of hotel guests. A manager claimed to have felt an unseen presence in her office late one night when she knew she was all alone.
