= Samuel Fleming House =

Coordinates: 40.50952°N 74.8616°W

- Flemington Historic District
- U.S. National Register of Historic Places
- U.S. Historic district – Contributing property
- New Jersey Register of Historic Places
- Location within Hunterdon County, New Jersey Location within New Jersey Location within the United States
- Location: Roughly bounded by NJ 12, NJ 31, N. Main, Shields, and Hopewell Aves., Flemington, New Jersey
- Built: 1756
- NRHP reference No.: 80002493
- NJRHP No.: 1587
- Added to NRHP: September 17, 1980

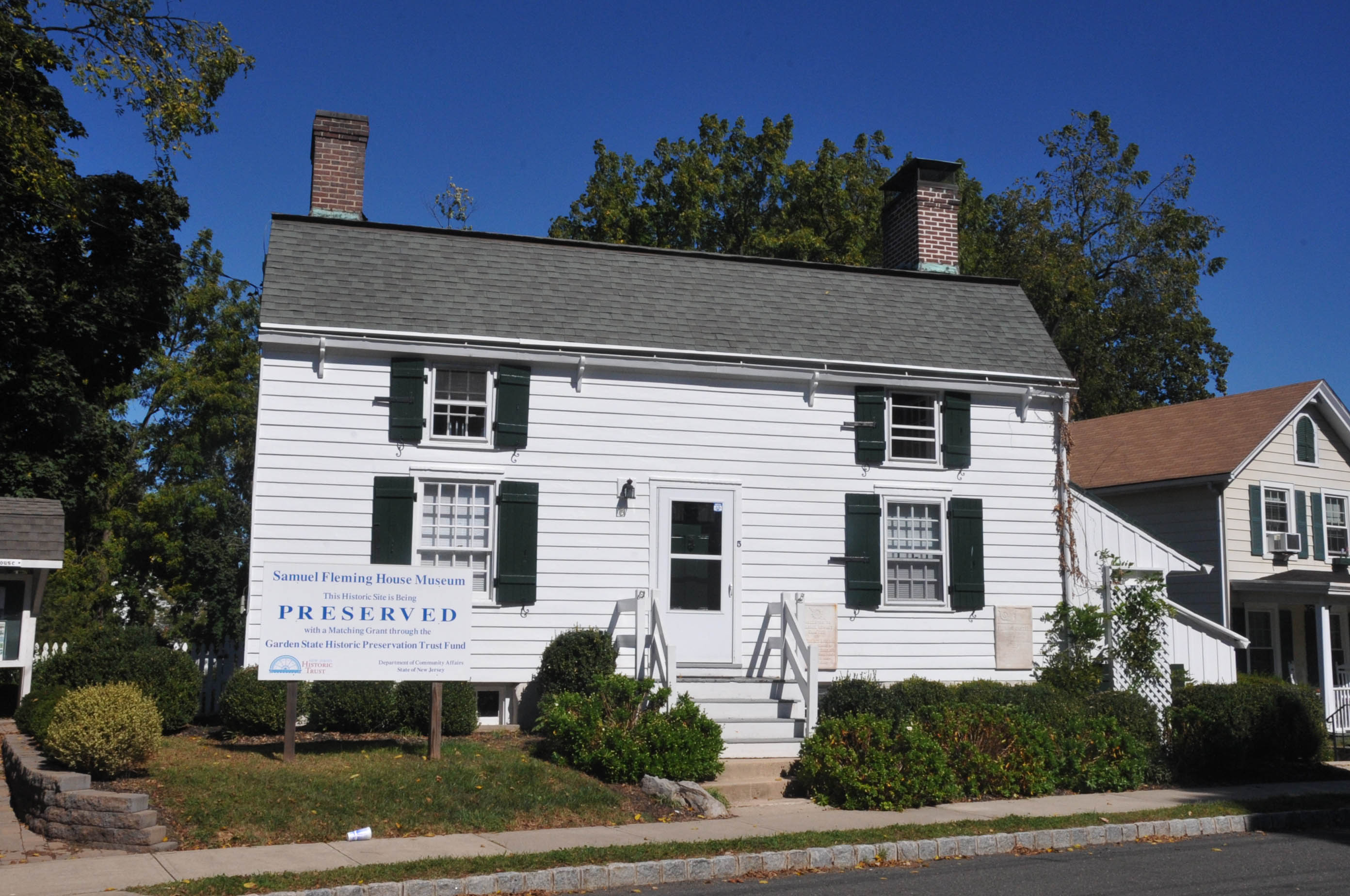

The Samuel Fleming House, also known as Flemington Castle, is a historic home located in Flemington, in Hunterdon County, New Jersey, United States, built in 1756. The building is now operated as a museum. It is the oldest surviving house in the borough. It is part of the Flemington Historic District.

Samuel Fleming, born in Ireland in 1707, came to the present-day United States and worked nearby as a tavernmaster, and bought 210 acres (0.85 km^{2}) in present-day Flemington as the site for a home in 1741 from Thomas Penn, son of William Penn, the founder of the Province of Pennsylvania. After the house was constructed in 1756, the area becoming known as "The Fleming Settlement", then as "Fleming's" and was known as "Flemington" by the 1870s. Fleming operated a tavern, often said to be in the house itself, which was said to have been visited by General George Washington, who it was claimed wrote about "stopping at Fleming's" in his journal.

The site was sold to the Borough of Flemington by the Daughters of the American Revolution for use as a museum. The Castle has been arranged to depict typical life in the 18th century including a colonial-style kitchen, ladies parlor and tavern room.

A 2007 study by an historic preservation consultancy hired by the borough determined that claims that the house had been used as tavern, as a stagecoach stop and as a post office, and that it had been visited by George Washington were untrue, and had been embellished based on a newspaper story dating to 1870. A review of historical documents showed that Fleming operated a tavern, but that it was not located in the historic house. Court records showed that the Fleming Castle property had been seized in a sheriff's sale in 1763 and the tavern was seized in a separate sale in 1766. Records also showed that Fleming had been given a license to operate a tavern in 1746, ten years before the house was built. Despite longstanding tradition, an analysis of contemporary documents found no mention of Washington ever having visited the site.

The research also determined that there was no evidence that Fleming used the term "castle" to refer to his home. The minutes of a meeting of the Colonel Lowrey Chapter of the Daughters of the American Revolution held in 1906 contain the first reference to the site as the "Fleming Castle". The house was deeded to the Lowrey Chapter in 1927, which maintained the site and used it as its offices and as a museum. The group sold the house to the borough of Flemington in 2005 for $138,000.
