= Flemington Historic District =

Historic district in New Jersey, United States

- U.S. National Register of Historic Places
- U.S. Historic district
- New Jersey Register of Historic Places
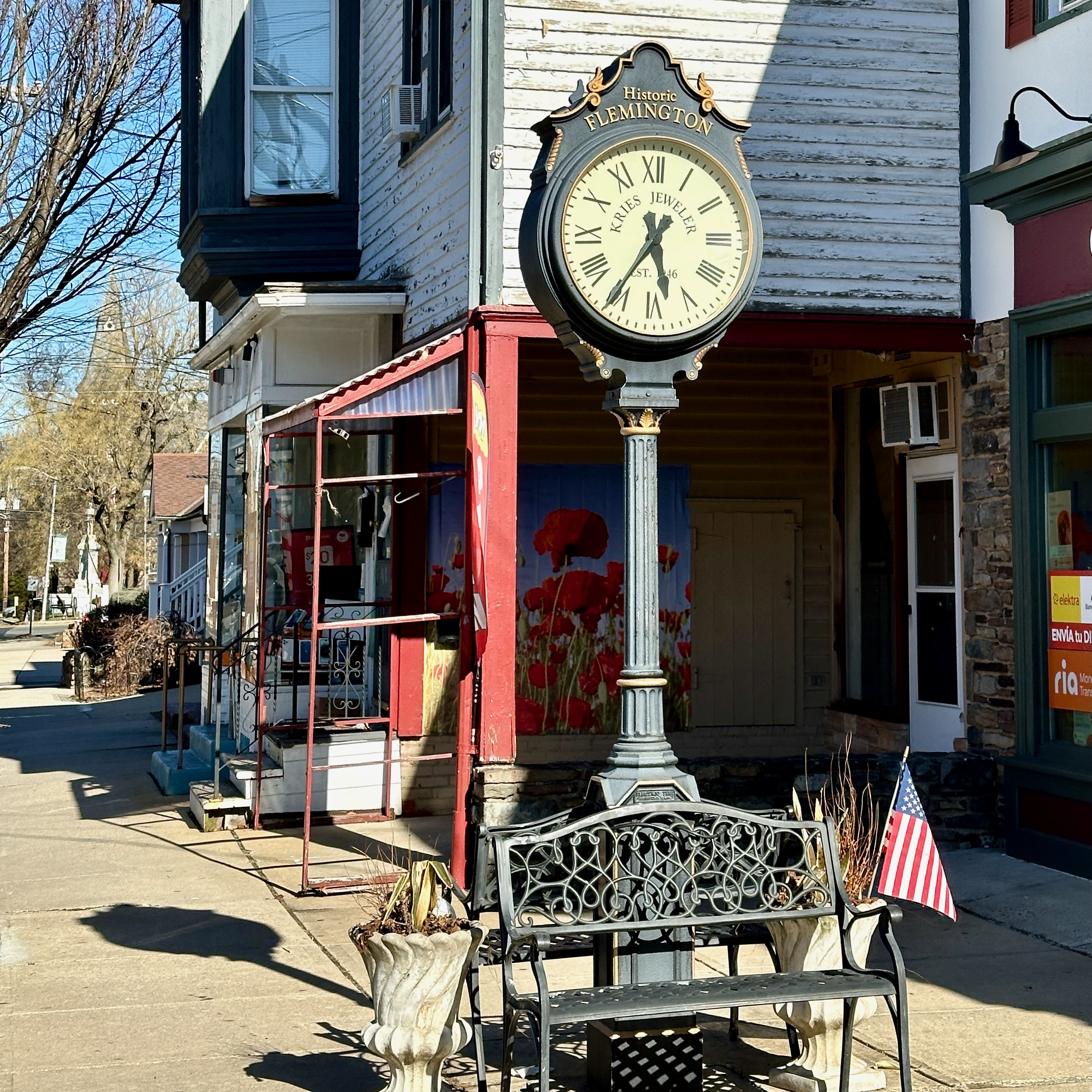
- Contributing properties along Main Street

- Location within Hunterdon County, New Jersey Location within New Jersey Location within the United States
- Location: Roughly bounded by NJ 12, NJ 31, N. Main, Shields, and Hopewell Aves., Flemington, New Jersey
- Coordinates: 40°30′32″N 74°51′38″W
- Built: 1756
- Architect: Multiple
- Architectural style: Late Victorian, Greek Revival, Cottage
- NRHP reference No.: 80002493
- NJRHP No.: 1587

Significant dates
- Added to NRHP: September 17, 1980
- Designated NJRHP: February 27, 1980

The Flemington Historic District is a historic district in the borough of Flemington in Hunterdon County, New Jersey, United States. After evaluation by the state historic preservation office (SHPO), it was listed on New Jersey Register of Historic Places (NJRHP #1587)) and the National Register of Historic Places (NRHP #80002493) on September 17, 1980, for its significance in architecture and politics/government. One has been documented by the Historic American Buildings Survey (HABS).

== Description ==
Among the contributing properties (CP) are:

- Union Hotel – Early 19th century hotel in downtown Flemington that served as a restaurant until its 2008 closure. The current structure dates to 1877, built on the site of what had been a stagecoach stop that dates to 1814.
- Hunterdon County Courthouse – Historic court house where the Lindbergh Trial took place. Now used for County offices.
- Fleming Castle / Samuel Fleming House – First house in Flemington, 5 Bonnell Street. Purchased by the Borough of Flemington in 2005 and operated as a historical museum by the Friends of Fleming Castle.
- Alexander Wurts Law Office – Erected in 1811 by Samuel L. Southard, who was later a U.S. Senator, Secretary of the Navy, and the 10th Governor of New Jersey. It was the law office of Peter D. Vroom, later the 9th Governor of New Jersey, from 1817 to 1819, and the law office of Alexander Wurts from 1820 to 1881. It was redesigned with Greek Revival style in 1840 by Mahlon Fisher.

== Gallery ==
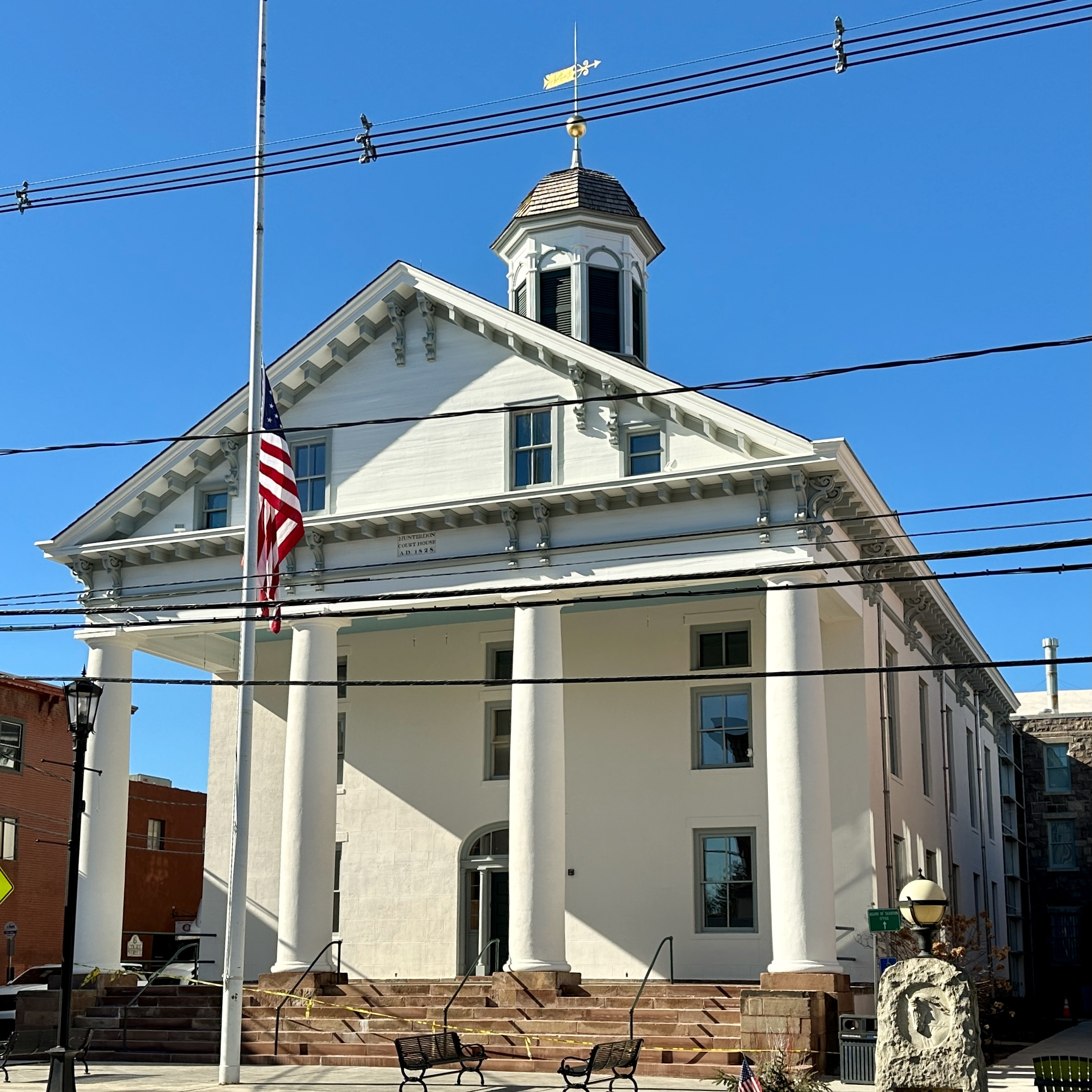
Hunterdon County Courthouse

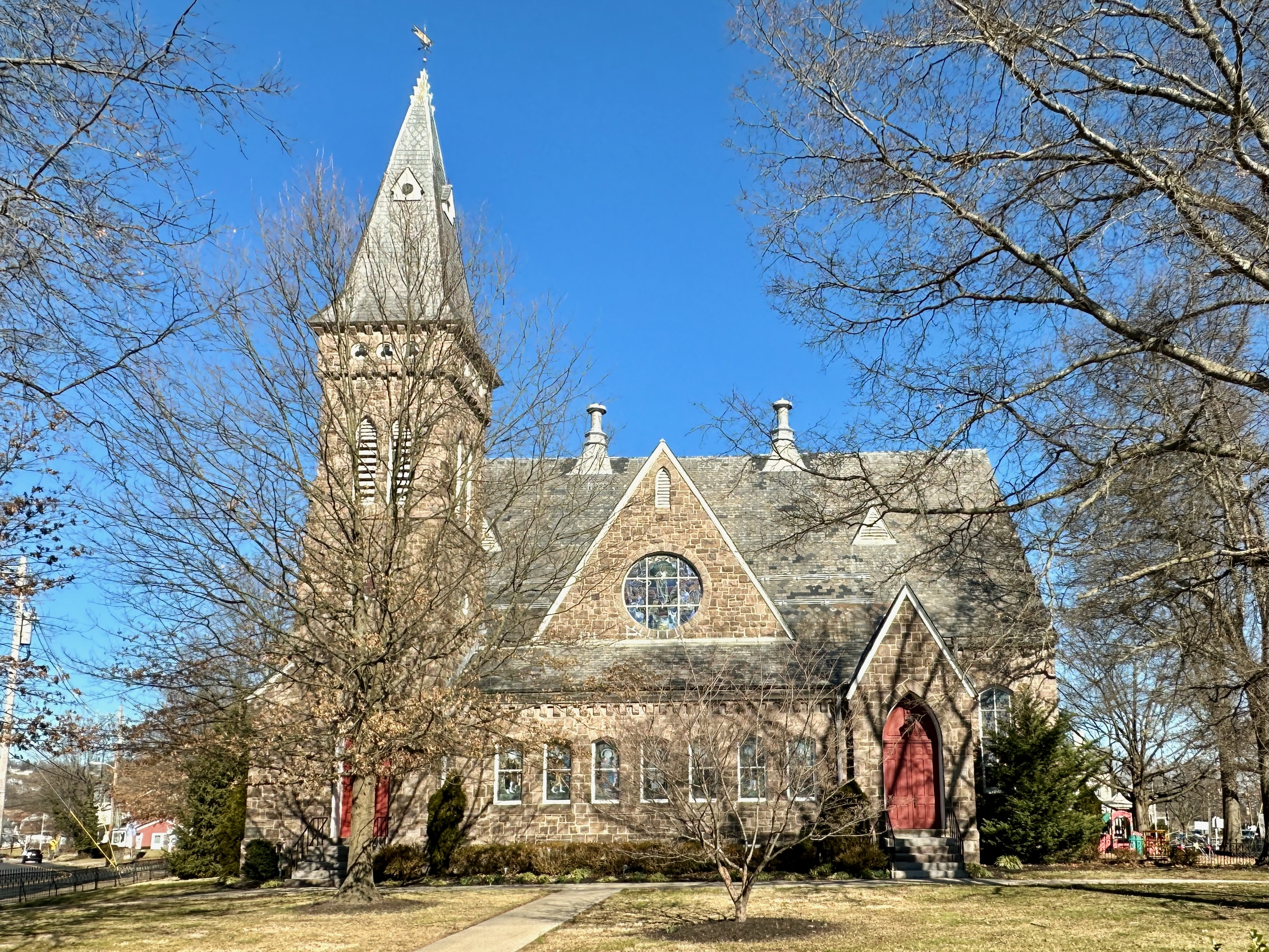
Flemington Presbyterian Church

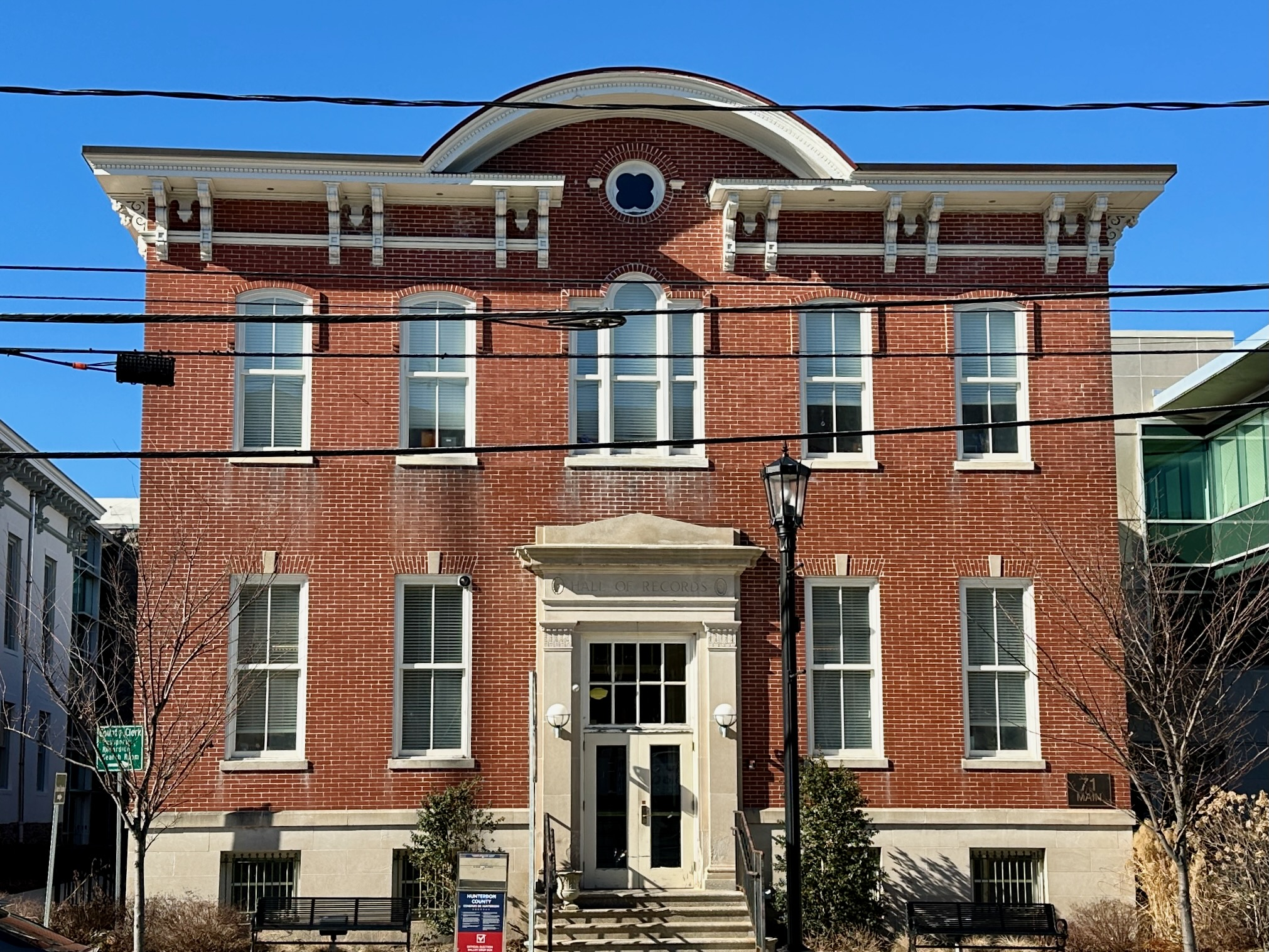
Hunterdon County Hall of Records

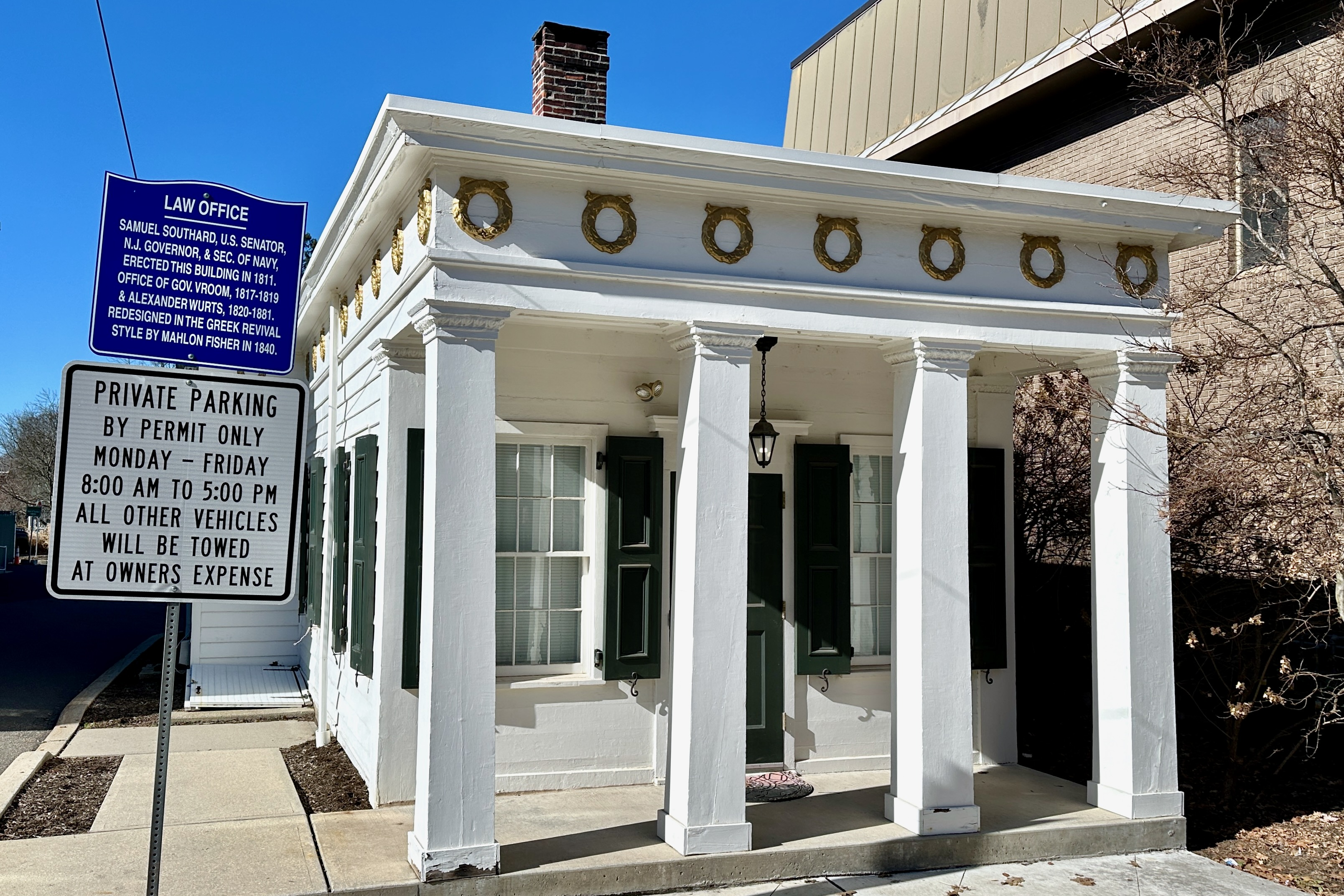
Alexander Wurts Law Office

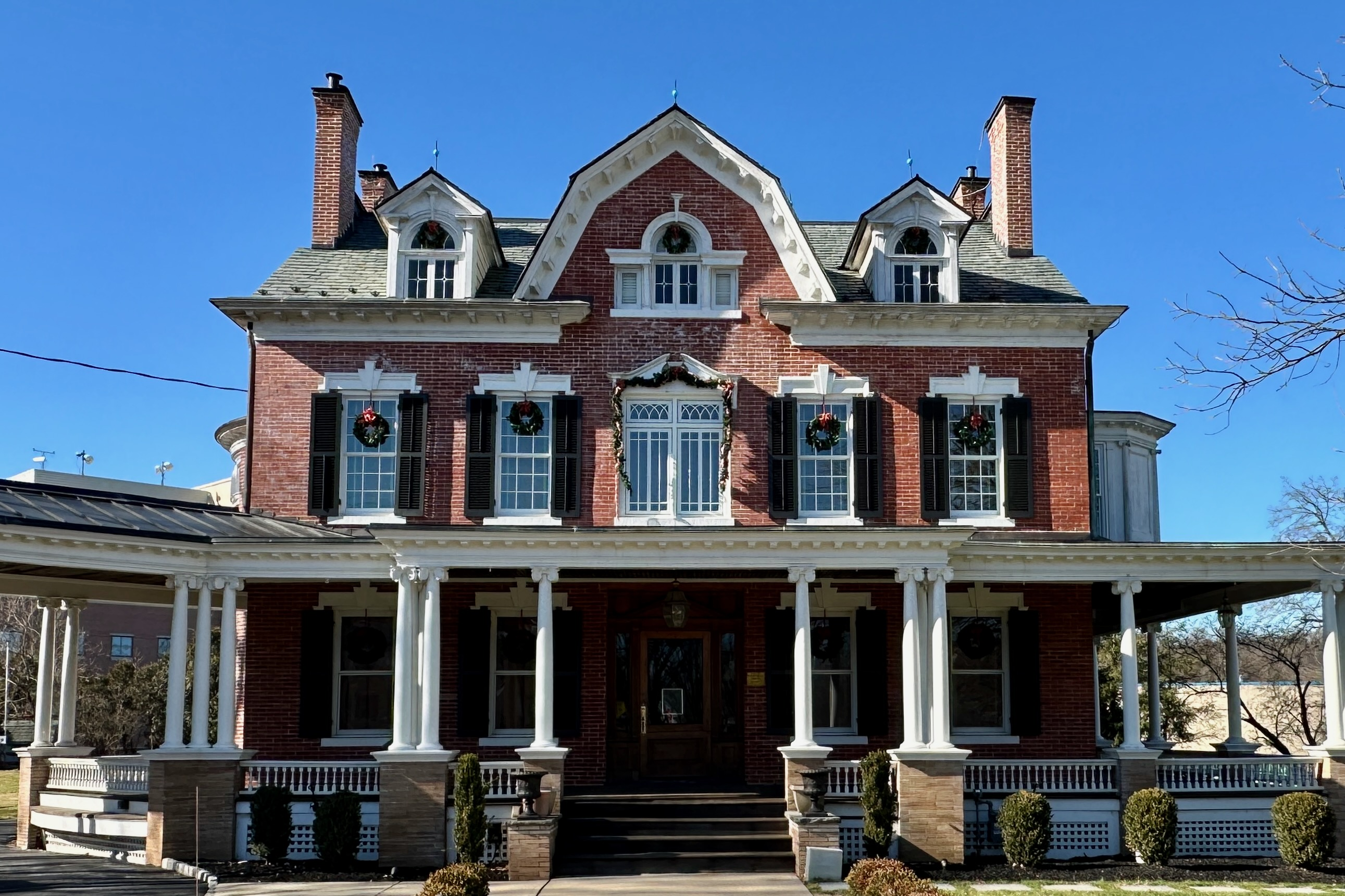
Late 19th century Queen Anne style house

== See also ==
- National Register of Historic Places listings in Hunterdon County, New Jersey
