= Killing of Barry Deloatch =

American shot and killed by the police

Shooting of Barry Deloatch
- Date: September 22, 2011
- Location: New Brunswick, New Jersey, U.S.
- Participants: New Brunswick police officers
- Deaths: Barry Deloatch
- Charges: None filed

The killing of Barry "Gene" Deloatch occurred on the early morning of September 22, 2011, in New Brunswick, New Jersey. Deloatch, an unarmed man, who had attacked a police officer with a 2x4 was shot twice and killed by police. Officers later claimed he attempted to hit them with a wooden stick. The circumstances of his death generated significant controversy, leading to a series of high-profile resident protests and an investigation by the Middlesex County Prosecutor. In 2016, the city reached an agreement with the sons of Deloatch in the wrongful death civil suit they filed; the settlement was in the amount of $300,000.

== Background ==
Deloatch worked at New Brunswick High School as security officer and maintenance staff. He was planning to marry his long-time girlfriend in January 2012. Deloatch had been convicted of two drug offenses in New Brunswick in the previous decade.

== The incident ==
Officers approached Deloatch and two other men around 12:12 AM near the intersection of Throop Avenue and Handy Street. Deloatch fled into a nearby alley and two police officers followed. He fled by crawling under a fence, and Officer Mazan attempted to follow him through the fence while Officer Berdel attempted to go around a nearby house to approach from the other side. Officer Mazan became entrapped and unable to access his weapons. According to officers, Deloatch began to hit Officer Mazan in the head with a stick, and failed to follow Officer Berdel's orders to stop attacking the officer. He was shot twice in the side. Deloatch had no firearm, but after the incident occurred, radio recordings state "the suspect was attempting to hit us with a wooden stick". Deloatch was pronounced dead at Robert Wood Johnson University Hospital at 12:37 AM.

== The officers ==
According to court papers, Brad Berdel was the shooter, and his partner was Dan Mazan. The two had been the subject of nine internal affairs investigations over their careers, with allegations ranging from "demeanor complaints" to "excessive force", and one complaint of "differential treatment" came from a fellow police officer. The two of them were also involved in 10 use-of-force incidents in 2010 (above the department average of five), with 80 percent of them involving black or Latino men. Berdel was one of very few officers to have kicking, uses of chemical spray and use of hands or fists cited in complaints.

== Protests ==
The community response began with a protest of about 100 people outside City Hall the day following the shooting. Protests continued on a daily basis, including marches down George Street that disrupted commuter traffic.

Support to the protestors has come from national civil rights organizations such as the National Action Network and NAACP. The Latino Leadership Alliance has requested to present the case before grand jury. Al Sharpton called for the ACLU to investigate.

Deloatch's funeral was held on October 8, and it was marked an additional "Day of Outrage" protest. On October 24, another major protest was held at Feaster park.

== Aftermath ==
Mayor Cahill held a public forum on police-community relations. The NBPD agreed to some internal affairs reforms.

The two police officers involved were placed on administrative leave, and ultimately a Middlesex County grand jury declined to charge either officer. Brad Berdel resigned in August 2012 due to three departmental violations.

In 2016, New Brunswick and Deloatch's family reached an agreement on a settlement of $300,000 for the death of Deloatch.

== See also ==
- Police brutality in the United States
