= Flemington, New Jersey =

Borough in Hunterdon County, New Jersey, US

- Borough
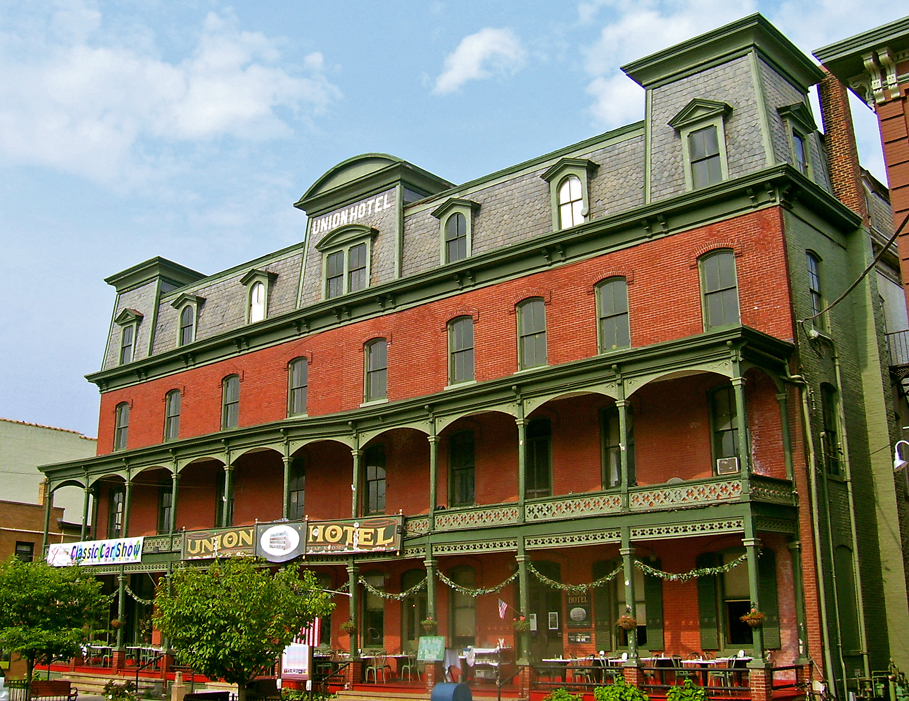
- Union Hotel in downtown Flemington

- Seal

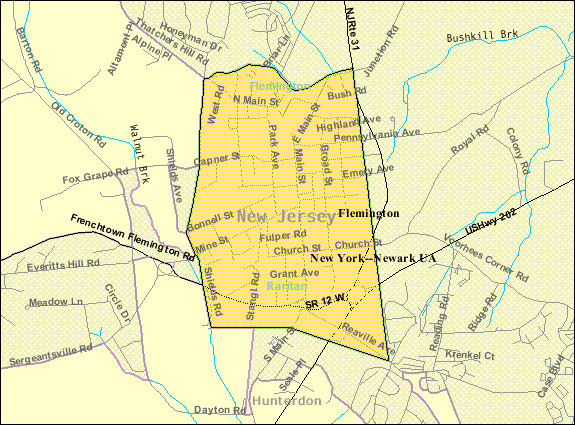
- Census Bureau map of Flemington, New Jersey Interactive map of Flemington, New Jersey

- Location of Flemington in Hunterdon County, New Jersey Location of Flemington in New Jersey Location in the United States
- Coordinates: 40.508641°N 74.859869°W
- Country: United States
- State: New Jersey
- County: Hunterdon
- Incorporated: April 26, 1910
- Named for: Samuel Fleming

Government
  - Type: Borough
  - Body: Borough Council
  - Mayor: Marcia A. Karrow (R, term ends December 31, 2026)
  - Municipal clerk: Carla Conner

Area
  - Total: 1.08 sq mi (2.79 km^{2})
  - Land: 1.08 sq mi (2.79 km^{2})
  - Water: 0 sq mi (0.00 km^{2}) 0.00%
  - Rank: 494th of 565 in state 22nd of 26 in county
- Elevation: 180 ft (55 m)

Population (2020)
  - Total: 4,876
  - Estimate (2023): 4,902 ▲
  - Rank: 381st of 565 in state 8th of 26 in county
  - Density: 4,530/sq mi (1,750/km^{2})
  - Rank: 130th of 565 in state 1st of 26 in county
- Time zone: UTC−05:00 (Eastern (EST))
  - Summer (DST): UTC−04:00 (Eastern (EDT))
- ZIP Code: 08822
- Area code: 908
- FIPS code: 3401923700
- GNIS feature ID: 885220
- Website: www.historicflemington.com

Flemington is a borough in and the county seat of Hunterdon County, in the U.S. state of New Jersey. Most of the borough is located in the Amwell Valley, a low-lying area of the Newark Basin, and the Raritan Valley, the South Branch of the Raritan River, which flows through the center of Flemington. Northwestern portions of the borough sit on the Hunterdon Plateau. As of the 2020 United States census, the borough's population was 4,876, its highest decennial count ever and an increase of 295 (+6.4%) from the 2010 census count of 4,581, which in turn reflected an increase of 381 (+9.1%) from the 4,200 counted in the 2000 census.

Flemington is an independent municipality completely surrounded by Raritan Township and is located near the geographic center of the township. Flemington was incorporated as an independent borough by an act of the New Jersey Legislature on April 7, 1910, based on the results of a referendum held on April 26, 1910, and was formally separated from Raritan Township.

== History ==
=== 18th century ===
Before European settlement, the land that comprises Flemington, as was all of Hunterdon County, was the territory of the Lenni Lenape Native Americans. In 1712, as part of a land parcel of 9,170 acres (37.1 km^{2}), the Flemington area was acquired by William Penn and Daniel Coxe.

The surrounding fertile farmland dictated that the beginnings of Flemington were agricultural. Early German and English settlers engaged in industries dependent on farm products. As time passed poultry and dairy farms superseded crops in agricultural importance. An example of early settlement families was Johann David and Anna Maria Ephland, who emigrated in 1709 from Germany through London to New York and settled on his 147.5-acre (0.597 km^{2}) farm in 1717. They raised their seven children, and two from his previous marriage, on the farm that now makes up the core of Flemington.

On December 14, 1776, during the American Revolutionary War, a party of British dragoons led by Cornet Francis Geary raided a store owned by Thomas Lowrey near the Presbyterian Church in Flemington to seize a supply of guns. On their return to Pennington, local militia led by Captain John Schenck ambushed them and killed their commander. This skirmish is now known as the Ambush of Geary.

In 1785, Flemington was chosen as the County Seat of Hunterdon. Fire destroyed the old courthouse in 1826 and the City of Lambertville made an ultimately unsuccessful attempt to have the seat relocated there. Flemington remained the County Seat and the Courthouse which stands today on Main Street was built.

=== 19th century ===
Present-day Flemington was originally formed as a town by an act of the New Jersey Legislature on March 14, 1870, within portions of Raritan Township. It became a village as of June 11, 1894, still within Raritan Township. Flemington was finally incorporated as an independent borough by an act of the New Jersey Legislature on April 7, 1910, based on the results of a referendum held on April 26, 1910, and was formally separated from Raritan Township. The borough's incorporation was confirmed on April 27, 1931. the borough was named for Samuel Fleming.

In 1856, the Hunterdon County Agricultural society purchased 40 acres (16 ha) of land that would accommodate the people, exhibits and livestock for the County (Flemington) Fair. The purpose of this Fair was to promote competition between farmers, stock raisers and machinery manufacturers. The fair was held every year at the Flemington Fairgrounds which also was the site of Flemington Fair Speedway, later Flemington Raceway.

=== 20th century ===
On February 13, 1935, a jury in Flemington found Bruno Richard Hauptmann guilty of the kidnapping and murder of Charles Lindbergh's baby boy. The Union Hotel, opposite the courthouse in which this trial took place, housed several journalists reporting on the event.

In the 1980s, Flemington became home to Liberty Village, the first outlet mall in the United States; by 2023, Liberty Village set empty, awaiting demolition and redevelopment.

From 1992 through 1995, the speedway hosted the Race of Champions, a race for modified racers. The speedway hosted a NASCAR Craftsman Truck Series race from 1995 to 1998. In 2003, the County Fair adopted a new name, the Hunterdon County 4-H and Agricultural Fair, and moved to the South County Park in East Amwell Township.

=== 21st century ===
In the 2010s, local controversy erupted over proposed re-development of the shuttered Union Hotel. By 2021, a settlement was reach to allow a hotel with 100 rooms and nearly 200 apartments and retail space at the site.

=== Historic landmarks ===
By 1980, 65% of Flemington borough had been included on the New Jersey Register of Historic Places and is now on the National Register of Historic Places as the Flemington Historic District.

- Union Hotel – Early 19th century hotel in downtown Flemington that served as a restaurant until its 2008 closure. The current structure dates to 1877, built on the site of what had been a stagecoach stop that dates to 1814.
- Hunterdon County Courthouse – Historic court house where the Lindbergh Trial took place. Now used for County offices.
- Fleming Castle / Samuel Fleming House – First house in Flemington, 5 Bonnell Street. Purchased by the Borough of Flemington in 2005 and operated as a historical museum by the Friends of Fleming Castle.

== Geography ==
According to the U.S. Census Bureau, the borough had a total area of 1.08 square miles (2.79 km^{2}), all of which was land. Flemington is completely surrounded by Raritan Township, making it part one of 21 pairs of "doughnut towns" in the state, where one municipality entirely surrounds another.

=== Climate ===
Climate data for Flemington, New Jersey (1991–2020 normals, extremes 1898–present)
| Month | Jan | Feb | Mar | Apr | May | Jun | Jul | Aug | Sep | Oct | Nov | Dec | Year |
|---|---|---|---|---|---|---|---|---|---|---|---|---|---|
| Record high °F (°C) | 74 (23) | 78 (26) | 88 (31) | 95 (35) | 99 (37) | 102 (39) | 106 (41) | 108 (42) | 105 (41) | 97 (36) | 84 (29) | 75 (24) | 108 (42) |
| Mean daily maximum °F (°C) | 37.8 (3.2) | 40.9 (4.9) | 49.6 (9.8) | 62.5 (16.9) | 72.4 (22.4) | 80.9 (27.2) | 85.9 (29.9) | 84.1 (28.9) | 77.4 (25.2) | 65.0 (18.3) | 53.3 (11.8) | 42.8 (6.0) | 62.7 (17.1) |
| Daily mean °F (°C) | 29.2 (−1.6) | 31.3 (−0.4) | 39.3 (4.1) | 50.6 (10.3) | 60.5 (15.8) | 69.5 (20.8) | 74.6 (23.7) | 72.7 (22.6) | 65.7 (18.7) | 53.6 (12.0) | 43.2 (6.2) | 34.5 (1.4) | 52.1 (11.2) |
| Mean daily minimum °F (°C) | 20.6 (−6.3) | 21.8 (−5.7) | 29.0 (−1.7) | 38.7 (3.7) | 48.6 (9.2) | 58.0 (14.4) | 63.3 (17.4) | 61.4 (16.3) | 54.0 (12.2) | 42.3 (5.7) | 33.2 (0.7) | 26.2 (−3.2) | 41.4 (5.2) |
| Record low °F (°C) | −18 (−28) | −16 (−27) | −6 (−21) | 10 (−12) | 25 (−4) | 34 (1) | 41 (5) | 37 (3) | 27 (−3) | 18 (−8) | 2 (−17) | −14 (−26) | −18 (−28) |
| Average precipitation inches (mm) | 3.93 (100) | 3.11 (79) | 4.52 (115) | 4.14 (105) | 4.28 (109) | 4.77 (121) | 4.94 (125) | 4.24 (108) | 4.39 (112) | 4.46 (113) | 3.50 (89) | 4.66 (118) | 50.94 (1,294) |
| Average snowfall inches (cm) | 6.2 (16) | 9.4 (24) | 5.7 (14) | 0.9 (2.3) | 0.0 (0.0) | 0.0 (0.0) | 0.0 (0.0) | 0.0 (0.0) | 0.0 (0.0) | 0.0 (0.0) | 0.4 (1.0) | 4.5 (11) | 27.1 (69) |
| Average precipitation days (≥ 0.01 in) | 10.6 | 9.1 | 10.8 | 11.6 | 12.9 | 11.5 | 10.9 | 10.6 | 8.6 | 10.0 | 9.0 | 10.9 | 126.5 |
| Average snowy days (≥ 0.1 in) | 4.2 | 3.6 | 2.9 | 0.3 | 0.0 | 0.0 | 0.0 | 0.0 | 0.0 | 0.0 | 0.4 | 2.3 | 13.7 |
Source: NOAA

== Demographics ==
Historical population
| Census | Pop. | Note | %± |
|---|---|---|---|
| 1860 | 1,174 | | — |
| 1870 | 1,412 | | 20.3% |
| 1880 | 1,751 | | 24.0% |
| 1890 | 1,977 | | 12.9% |
| 1900 | 2,145 | | 8.5% |
| 1910 | 2,693 | | 25.5% |
| 1920 | 2,590 | | −3.8% |
| 1930 | 2,729 | | 5.4% |
| 1940 | 2,617 | | −4.1% |
| 1950 | 3,058 | | 16.9% |
| 1960 | 3,232 | | 5.7% |
| 1970 | 3,917 | | 21.2% |
| 1980 | 4,132 | | 5.5% |
| 1990 | 4,047 | | −2.1% |
| 2000 | 4,200 | | 3.8% |
| 2010 | 4,581 | | 9.1% |
| 2020 | 4,876 | | 6.4% |
| 2023 (est.) | 4,902 | ▲ | 0.5% |
Population sources: 1860–1920; 1870 1880–1890; 1890–1910 1910–1930; 1940–2000 2000; 2010 2020

=== 2020 census ===
As of the 2020 census, Flemington had a population of 4,876. The median age was 34.8 years. 26.4% of residents were under the age of 18 and 11.1% of residents were 65 years of age or older. For every 100 females there were 99.9 males, and for every 100 females age 18 and over there were 98.4 males age 18 and over.

100.0% of residents lived in urban areas, while 0.0% lived in rural areas.

There were 1,853 households in Flemington, of which 36.0% had children under the age of 18 living in them. Of all households, 39.0% were married-couple households, 23.2% were households with a male householder and no spouse or partner present, and 30.3% were households with a female householder and no spouse or partner present. About 33.4% of all households were made up of individuals and 12.7% had someone living alone who was 65 years of age or older.

There were 1,974 housing units, of which 6.1% were vacant. The homeowner vacancy rate was 3.4% and the rental vacancy rate was 4.1%.

Racial composition as of the 2020 census
| Race | Number | Percent |
|---|---|---|
| White | 2,592 | 53.2% |
| Black or African American | 146 | 3.0% |
| American Indian and Alaska Native | 75 | 1.5% |
| Asian | 319 | 6.5% |
| Native Hawaiian and Other Pacific Islander | 6 | 0.1% |
| Some other race | 1,135 | 23.3% |
| Two or more races | 603 | 12.4% |
| Hispanic or Latino (of any race) | 1,928 | 39.5% |

=== 2010 census ===
The 2010 United States census counted 4,581 people, 1,815 households, and 996 families in the borough. The population density was 4,252.2 per square mile (1,641.8/km^{2}). There were 1,926 housing units at an average density of 1,787.8 per square mile (690.3/km^{2}). The racial makeup was 78.48% (3,595) White, 3.93% (180) Black or African American, 0.31% (14) Native American, 5.81% (266) Asian, 0.02% (1) Pacific Islander, 8.71% (399) from other races, and 2.75% (126) from two or more races. Hispanic or Latino of any race were 26.15% (1,198) of the population.

Of the 1,815 households, 28.5% had children under the age of 18; 37.6% were married couples living together; 11.5% had a female householder with no husband present and 45.1% were non-families. Of all households, 37.1% were made up of individuals and 12.5% had someone living alone who was 65 years of age or older. The average household size was 2.44 and the average family size was 3.20.

22.3% of the population were under the age of 18, 9.1% from 18 to 24, 33.9% from 25 to 44, 24.3% from 45 to 64, and 10.3% who were 65 years of age or older. The median age was 35.3 years. For every 100 females, the population had 105.5 males. For every 100 females ages 18 and older there were 106.9 males.

The Census Bureau's 2006–2010 American Community Survey showed that (in 2010 inflation-adjusted dollars) median household income was $54,261 (with a margin of error of +/− $15,065) and the median family income was $66,042 (+/− $12,761). Males had a median income of $45,934 (+/− $5,574) versus $47,917 (+/− $11,616) for females. The per capita income for the borough was $31,407 (+/− $3,648). About 14.0% of families and 16.1% of the population were below the poverty line, including 30.0% of those under age 18 and 8.9% of those age 65 or over.

=== 2000 census ===
As of the 2000 United States census there were 4,202 people, 1,804 households, and 997 families residing in the borough. The population density was 3,927.4 inhabitants per square mile (1,516.4/km^{2}). There were 1,876 housing units at an average density of 1,754.2 per square mile (677.3/km^{2}). The racial makeup of the borough was 89.71% White, 1.19% African American, 0.31% Native American, 3.12% Asian, 0.17% Pacific Islander, 3.14% from other races, and 2.36% from two or more races. Hispanic or Latino of any race were 10.98% of the population.

There were 1,804 households, out of which 26.8% had children under the age of 18 living with them, 38.7% were married couples living together, 11.7% had a female householder with no husband present, and 44.7% were non-families. 37.7% of all households were made up of individuals, and 12.1% had someone living alone who was 65 years of age or older. The average household size was 2.26 and the average family size was 3.00.

In the borough, the population was spread out, with 22.2% under the age of 18, 8.6% from 18 to 24, 36.9% from 25 to 44, 20.2% from 45 to 64, and 12.1% who were 65 years of age or older. The median age was 35 years. For every 100 females, there were 94.3 males. For every 100 females age 18 and over, there were 92.7 males.

The median income for a household in the borough was $39,886, and the median income for a family was $51,582. Males had a median income of $38,594 versus $31,250 for females. The per capita income for the borough was $23,769. About 5.0% of families and 6.9% of the population were below the poverty line, including 7.5% of those under age 18 and 3.0% of those age 65 or over.

== Government ==
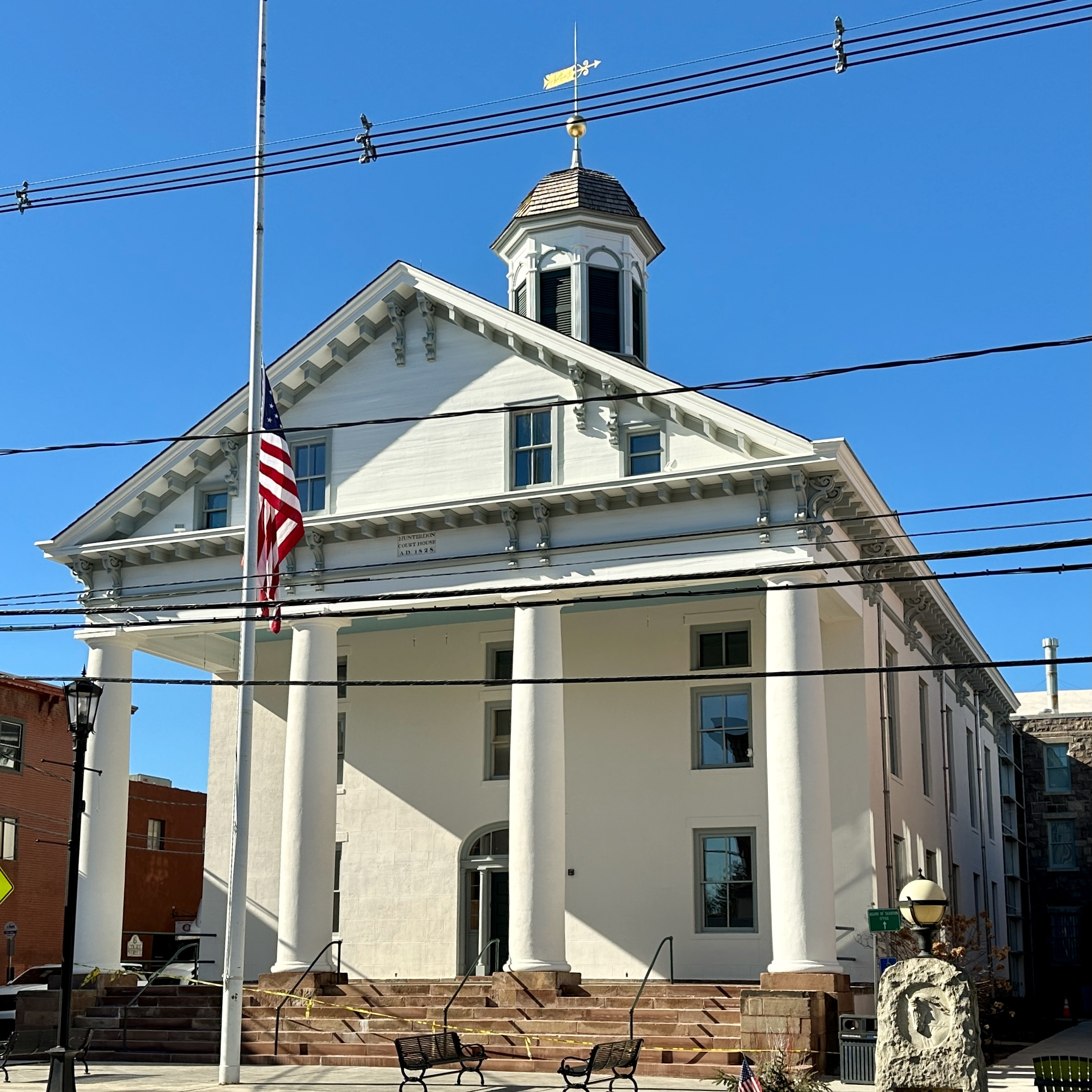
Hunterdon County Courthouse in the Flemington Historic District, where Bruno Hauptmann was tried

=== Local government ===
Flemington is governed under the borough form of New Jersey municipal government, which is used in 218 municipalities (of the 564) statewide, making it the most common form of government in New Jersey. The governing body is comprised of the mayor and the borough council, with all positions elected at-large on a partisan basis as part of the November general election. A mayor is elected directly by the voters to a four-year term of office. The borough council includes six members elected to serve three-year terms on a staggered basis, with two seats coming up for election each year in a three-year cycle. The borough form of government used by Flemington, the most common system used in the state, is a "weak mayor / strong council" government in which council members act as the legislative body with the mayor presiding at meetings and voting only in the event of a tie. The mayor can veto ordinances subject to an override by a two-thirds majority vote of the council. The mayor makes committee and liaison assignments for council members, and most appointments are made by the mayor with the advice and consent of the council.

As of 2023, the mayor of Flemington Borough is Republican Marcia A. Karrow, whose term of office ends December 31, 2026. Members of the Flemington Borough Council are Council President Anthony "Tony" Parker (D, 2027), Council Vice President Susan D.M. Engelhardt (D, 2028), Adrienne Fusaro (D, 2026), Beth Herbert (D, 2028), Trent Levitt (D, 2026), and Brandon Arias (D, 2027).

In January 2019, the borough council selected Jeffrey Doshna from a list of three candidates selected by the Democratic municipal committee to fill the seat expiring in December 2020 that was vacated by Betsy Driver when she took office earlier that month as mayor. Doshna served on an interim basis until the November 2019 general election, when Republican Kimberly A. Tilly was elected to serve the balance of the term of office.

In March 2022, Democrat Caitlin Giles-McCormick, who had started her new term of office on January 1 of that year, resigned from office.

==== Police ====
The borough's police department operates under Chief of police Jerry Rotella, with two lieutenants, three sergeants, one corporal, one detective, 8 patrolmen, and one Class III special police officer. The department offers a Police Explorer program.

=== Federal, state and county representation ===
Flemington is located in the 7th Congressional District and is part of New Jersey's 16th state legislative district.

For the 119th United States Congress, New Jersey's 7th congressional district is represented by Thomas Kean Jr. (R, Westfield). New Jersey is represented in the United States Senate by Democrats Cory Booker (Newark, term ends 2027) and Andy Kim (Moorestown, term ends 2031).

For the 2026–2027 session, the 16th legislative district of the New Jersey Legislature is represented in the New Jersey Senate by Andrew Zwicker (D, South Brunswick) and in the General Assembly by Mitchelle Drulis (D, East Amwell Township) and Roy Freiman (D, Hillsborough Township).

Hunterdon County is governed by a Board of County Commissioners comprised of five members who are elected at-large on a partisan basis to serve three-year terms of office on a staggered basis, with either one or two seats up for election each year as part of the November general election. At an annual reorganization meeting held each January, the commissioners select one member to serve as the board's Director and another to serve as Deputy Director, each for a one-year term. As of 2025, Hunterdon County's Commissioners are Director John E. Lanza (R; Raritan Township, 2025), Deputy Director Shaun C. Van Doren (R; Tewksbury Township, 2026), Jeff Kuhl (R; Raritan Township, 2027), Zachary T. Rich (R; West Amwell Township, 2025) and Susan Soloway (R; Franklin Township, 2027).

Constitutional officers elected on a countywide basis are Clerk Mary H. Melfi (R; Flemington, 2026), Sheriff Fredrick W. Brown (R; Alexandria Township, 2025) and Surrogate Heidi Rohrbach (R; Lebanon Township, 2028).

=== Politics ===
As of September 2023, there were a total of 2,466 registered voters in Flemington, of which 912 (36.9%) were registered as Democrats, 756 (30.6%) were registered as Republicans and 764 (30.9%) were registered as Unaffiliated. There were 13 voters registered as Libertarians or Greens and 21 registered to other parties.

Gubernatorial election results for Flemington
| Year | Republican | | Democratic | | Third party(ies) | |
| Year | No. | % | No. | % | No. | % |
|---|---|---|---|---|---|---|
| 2025 | 488 | 36.09% | 851 | 62.94% | 13 | 0.96% |
| 2021 | 546 | 46.79% | 611 | 52.36% | 10 | 0.86% |
| 2017 | 476 | 45.46% | 522 | 49.86% | 49 | 4.68% |
| 2013 | 656 | 68.12% | 282 | 29.28% | 25 | 2.60% |
| 2009 | 601 | 55.29% | 354 | 32.57% | 132 | 12.14% |
| 2005 | 466 | 49.95% | 413 | 44.27% | 54 | 5.79% |

In the 2024 presidential election, Democrat Kamala Harris received 55.3% of the vote (961 votes), ahead of Republican Donald Trump with 41.8% (727 votes), and other candidates with 3.3% (58 votes), among the 1,763 ballots cast by the borough's 2,491 registered voters, for a turnout of 70.8%. In the 2020 presidential election, Democrat Joe Biden received 56.3% (1,043 votes), ahead of Republican Donald Trump with 41.1% (762 votes), and other candidates with 2.3% (44 votes), among the 1,876 ballots cast by the borough's 2,264 registered voters, for a turnout of 82.9%. In the 2016 presidential election, Democrat Hillary Clinton received 49.2% of the vote (795 votes), ahead of Republican Donald Trump with 41.5% (670 votes), and other candidates with 8.1% (131 votes), among the 1,614 ballots cast by the borough's 2,265 registered voters, for a turnout of 71.26%. In the 2012 presidential election, Democrat Barack Obama received 50.4% of the vote (732 cast), ahead of Republican Mitt Romney with 47.5% (689 votes), and other candidates with 2.1% (31 votes), among the 1,467 ballots cast by the borough's 2,157 registered voters (15 ballots were spoiled), for a turnout of 68.0%. In the 2008 presidential election, Democrat Barack Obama received 49.9% of the vote (794 cast), ahead of Republican John McCain with 47.1% (750 votes) and other candidates with 2.1% (34 votes), among the 1,591 ballots cast by the borough's 2,118 registered voters, for a turnout of 75.1%.

United States presidential election results for Flemington
| Year | Republican | | Democratic | | Third party(ies) | |
| Year | No. | % | No. | % | No. | % |
|---|---|---|---|---|---|---|
| 2024 | 727 | 41.81% | 961 | 55.26% | 51 | 2.93% |
| 2020 | 762 | 41.12% | 1,043 | 56.29% | 48 | 2.59% |
| 2016 | 670 | 42.59% | 795 | 50.54% | 108 | 6.87% |
| 2012 | 689 | 47.45% | 732 | 50.41% | 31 | 2.13% |
| 2008 | 750 | 47.53% | 794 | 50.32% | 34 | 2.15% |
| 2004 | 760 | 49.16% | 761 | 49.22% | 25 | 1.62% |

In the 2013 gubernatorial election, Republican Chris Christie received 68.1% of the vote (656 cast), ahead of Democrat Barbara Buono with 29.3% (282 votes), and other candidates with 2.6% (25 votes), among the 994 ballots cast by the borough's 2,117 registered voters (31 ballots were spoiled), for a turnout of 47.0%. In the 2009 gubernatorial election, Republican Chris Christie received 54.6% of the vote (601 ballots cast), ahead of Democrat Jon Corzine with 32.2% (354 votes), Independent Chris Daggett with 10.2% (112 votes) and other candidates with 1.8% (20 votes), among the 1,101 ballots cast by the borough's 2,032 registered voters, yielding a 54.2% turnout.

United States Senate election results for Flemington1
| Year | Republican | | Democratic | | Third party(ies) | |
| Year | No. | % | No. | % | No. | % |
|---|---|---|---|---|---|---|
| 2024 | 665 | 40.77% | 900 | 55.18% | 66 | 4.05% |
| 2018 | 676 | 47.04% | 687 | 47.81% | 74 | 5.15% |
| 2012 | 650 | 46.83% | 683 | 49.21% | 55 | 3.96% |
| 2006 | 522 | 48.51% | 481 | 44.70% | 73 | 6.78% |

United States Senate election results for Flemington2
| Year | Republican | | Democratic | | Third party(ies) | |
| Year | No. | % | No. | % | No. | % |
|---|---|---|---|---|---|---|
| 2020 | 739 | 40.78% | 1,003 | 55.35% | 70 | 3.86% |
| 2014 | 477 | 48.82% | 465 | 47.59% | 35 | 3.58% |
| 2013 | 340 | 54.14% | 279 | 44.43% | 9 | 1.43% |
| 2008 | 721 | 48.95% | 666 | 45.21% | 86 | 5.84% |

== Education ==
Students in public school for pre-kindergarten through eighth grade attend the Flemington-Raritan Regional School District, which also serves children from the neighboring community of Raritan Township. As of the 2023–24 school year, the district, comprised of six schools, had an enrollment of 3,174 students and 335.3 classroom teachers (on an FTE basis), for a student–teacher ratio of 9.5:1. The district is comprised of four PreK/K to 4 elementary schools, one intermediate school for grades 5 and 6 and a middle school for grades 7 and 8. Schools in the district (with 2023–24 enrollment data from the National Center for Education Statistics) are Barley Sheaf School with 363 students in grades K–4 (located in Flemington), Copper Hill School with 602 students in grades PreK–4 (Ringoes), Francis A. Desmares School with 420 students in grades K–4 (Flemington), Robert Hunter School with 394 students in grades K–4 (Flemington), Reading-Fleming Intermediate School with 702 students in grades 5–6 (Flemington) and J. P. Case Middle School with 675 students in grades 7–8 (Flemington). Flemington is allocated two of the nine seats on the regional district's board of education.

Public school students in ninth through twelfth grades attend Hunterdon Central Regional High School, part of the Hunterdon Central Regional High School District, which serves students in central Hunterdon County from Flemington and from Delaware Township, East Amwell Township, Raritan Township and Readington Township. As of the 2023–24 school year, the high school had an enrollment of 2,408 students and 226.7 classroom teachers (on an FTE basis), for a student–teacher ratio of 10.6:1. Seats on the high school district's nine-member board of education are allocated based on the population of the five constituent municipalities who participate in the school district, with one seat allocated to Flemington.

Eighth grade students from all of Hunterdon County are eligible to apply to attend the high school programs offered by the Hunterdon County Vocational School District, a county-wide vocational school district that offers career and technical education at its campuses in Raritan Township and at programs sited at local high schools, with no tuition charged to students for attendance.

== Transportation ==
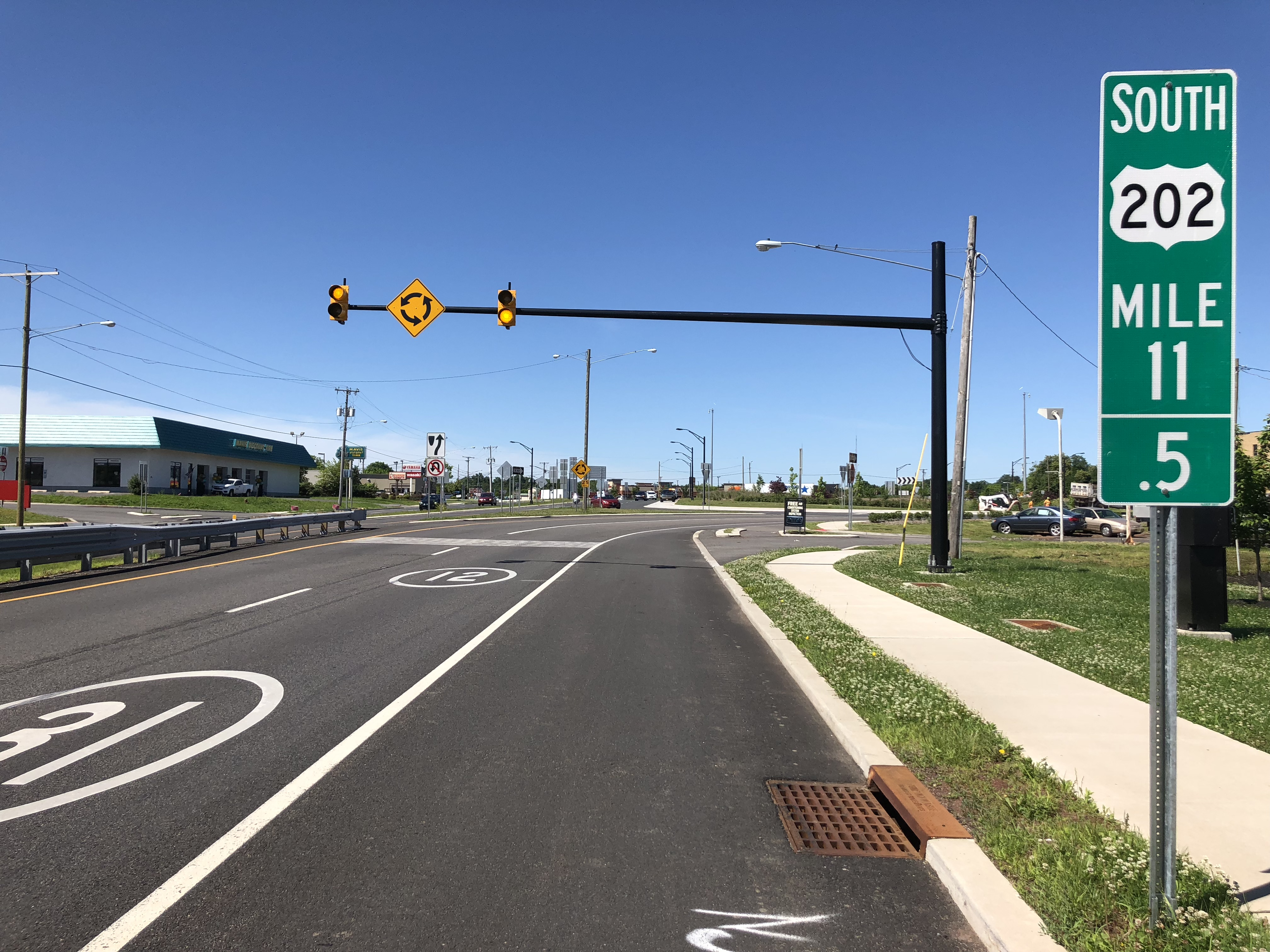
Southbound U.S. Route 202 approaching the Flemington Circle

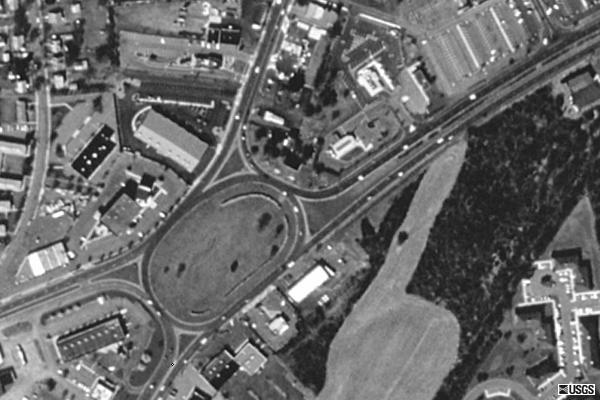
Aerial photo of Flemington Circle, as seen in 1995. A strip mall featuring a HomeGoods and a Jos A. Bank, and other stores has since been built on the field in the bottom right corner.

=== Roads and highways ===
As of March 2019, the borough had a total of 13.90 miles (22.37 km) of roadways, of which 11.53 miles (18.56 km) were maintained by the municipality, 0.78 miles (1.26 km) by Hunterdon County and 1.59 miles (2.56 km) by the New Jersey Department of Transportation.

Several major roads that pass through the borough. These include U.S. Route 202, Route 31 and Route 12.

Flemington Circle is the largest of three traffic circles in the Flemington area and sits just to the southeast of Flemington's historic downtown. U.S. Route 202 and Route 31 approach the circle separately from the north and continue south concurrently, and the circle is the eastern terminus of Route 12. It is one of only a rapidly diminishing number of New Jersey's once-widespread traffic circles still extant according to its original design. The circle sees significant congestion on weekends because of the new developments and big-box retailers. The circle also sees a higher rate of traffic accidents and violations than any other region of Flemington and Raritan Township. Unlike most circles, traffic on US 202 does not yield on entry; US 202, being a main four-lane divided highway, gets the right of way.

One other traffic circle exists on Route 12 at Mine Street west of the Flemington Circle, where Route 12 traffic has the right of way. The intersection of Route 12 and Main Street west of the Flemington Circle was converted to a roundabout in 2009.

=== Public transportation ===
Trans-Bridge Lines provides frequent daily bus service, west to Doylestown / Bethlehem, Pennsylvania, and east to Newark Liberty International Airport, the Port Authority Bus Terminal in Midtown Manhattan and John F. Kennedy International Airport. Round-trip tickets to the PABT cost $15.

The Hunterdon County LINK provide local bus service on Routes 16 / 19 / 21 which operate to / from Raritan Township, Route 23 to / from Bridgewater Commons Mall and Somerville; Route 15 to Hampton; Route 14 to / from Lambertville; and Route 17 / 18 between Milford and Clinton.

== Notable people ==
People who were born in, residents of, or otherwise closely associated with Flemington include:

- Aruna (born 1975), electronic music vocalist
- Brad Benson (born 1955), offensive lineman who played for the New York Giants
- John T. Bird (1829–1911), represented New Jersey's 3rd congressional district from 1869 to 1873
- Samuel L. Bodine (1900–1958), President of the New Jersey Senate and chairman of the New Jersey Republican State Committee who served as mayor of Flemington from 1928 to 1936
- Jen Bryant (born 1960), poet, novelist and children's author
- Jason Cabinda (born 1996), linebacker for the Detroit Lions
- Marjorie Hulsizer Copher (1892–1935), dietitian who served in World War I
- Jack Cust (born 1979), professional baseball designated hitter and outfielder
- Arthur Fauset (1899–1983), civil rights activist, folklorist, and educator
- Isaac G. Farlee (1787–1855), member of the United States House of Representatives from New Jersey's 3rd Congressional District from 1843 to 1845
- Danny Federici (1950–2008), organ and keyboard player for the E Street Band
- Arthur F. Foran (1882–1961), President of the New Jersey Senate
- Dick Foran (1910–1979), a B-movie actor who appeared in several films, most notably with the comedy team of Abbott and Costello
- Walter E. Foran (1919–1986), politician who served in the New Jersey General Assembly and New Jersey Senate
- Kimi Goetz (born 1994), speed skater who represented the United States at the 2022 Winter Olympics
- John A. Hanna (1762–1805), U.S. representative from Pennsylvania
- Rachna Korhonen, diplomat who has served as the United States ambassador to Mali
- Emily Mason (born 2002), professional soccer player who plays as a defender for Seattle Reign FC of the National Women's Soccer League
- John Patterson Bryan Maxwell (1804–1845), U.S. representative from New Jersey (1837–1839, 1841–1843)
- Barbara McClintock (born 1955), children's book author and illustrator
- Kathryn Minner (1892–1969), character actress best known as the Little Old Lady from Pasadena in a series of television commercials for Dodge which aired in Southern California from 1964 to 1969
- Charlie Morton (born 1983), Major League Baseball pitcher who has played for the Atlanta Braves, Pittsburgh Pirates and Tampa Bay Rays
- William E. Purcell (1856–1928), United States senator from North Dakota
- Chris Reynolds (born 1998), professional football quarterback for the Calgary Stampeders of the Canadian Football League
- Tucker Richardson, basketball player for Brussels Basketball of the BNXT League
- Richard Rubin (born 1983), television personality who appeared on the first season of Beauty and the Geek
- Brian Snyder (born 1958), former MLB pitcher who played for the Seattle Mariners and Oakland Athletics
- Samuel Lewis Southard (1787–1842), U.S. Senator, Secretary of the Navy, and the 10th Governor of New Jersey
- Alex Westlund (born 1975), retired professional ice hockey goaltender who has since been a coach
- Luke Stevenson (born 2004), college baseball catcher for the North Carolina Tar Heels
- Brian White (born 1996), soccer player who plays as a forward for the Vancouver Whitecaps in Major League Soccer
