= Hoboken City Hall =

- U.S. National Register of Historic Places
- New Jersey Register of Historic Places
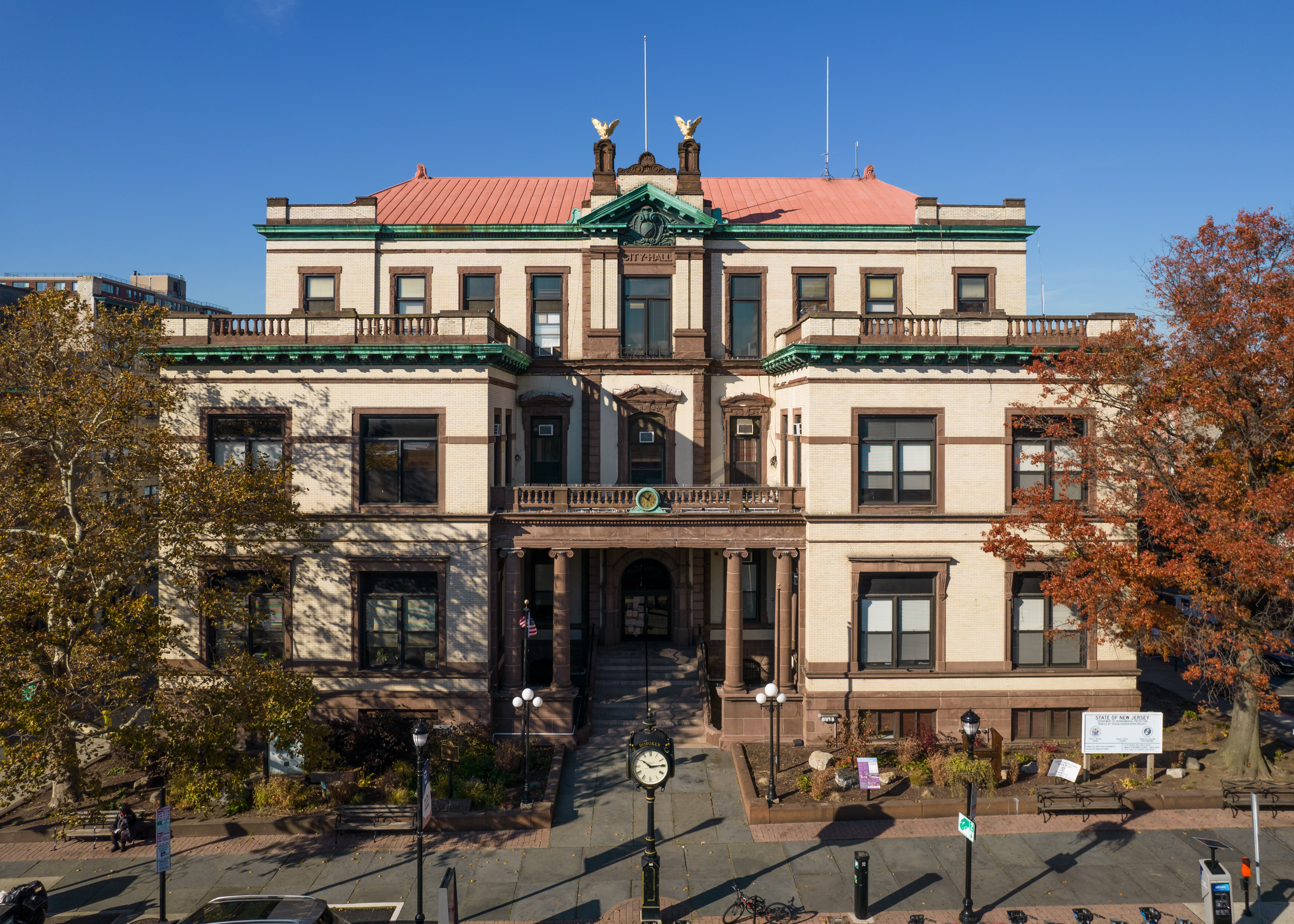
- Hoboken City Hall as seen from Washington Street

- Location within Hudson County, New Jersey Location within New Jersey Location within the United States
- Location: 94 Washington Street, Hoboken, New Jersey
- Coordinates: 40°44′14″N 74°1′53″W
- Area: 1 acre (0.40 ha)
- Built: 1883
- Architect: Francis G. Himpler
- Architectural style: Beaux Arts
- NRHP reference No.: 76001156
- NJRHP No.: 1469

Significant dates
- Added to NRHP: January 1, 1976
- Designated NJRHP: August 13, 1975

Hoboken City Hall is the seat of government of Hoboken, Hudson County, New Jersey, United States. The building was designed by Francis G. Himpler and was built in 1883. The building was added to the National Register of Historic Places on January 1, 1976. The building is a Second Empire structure modified to a Beaux Art Classicism design.

== See also ==
- National Register of Historic Places listings in Hudson County, New Jersey
