= Hunterdon County Courthouse =

- U.S. Historic district – Contributing property
- New Jersey Register of Historic Places
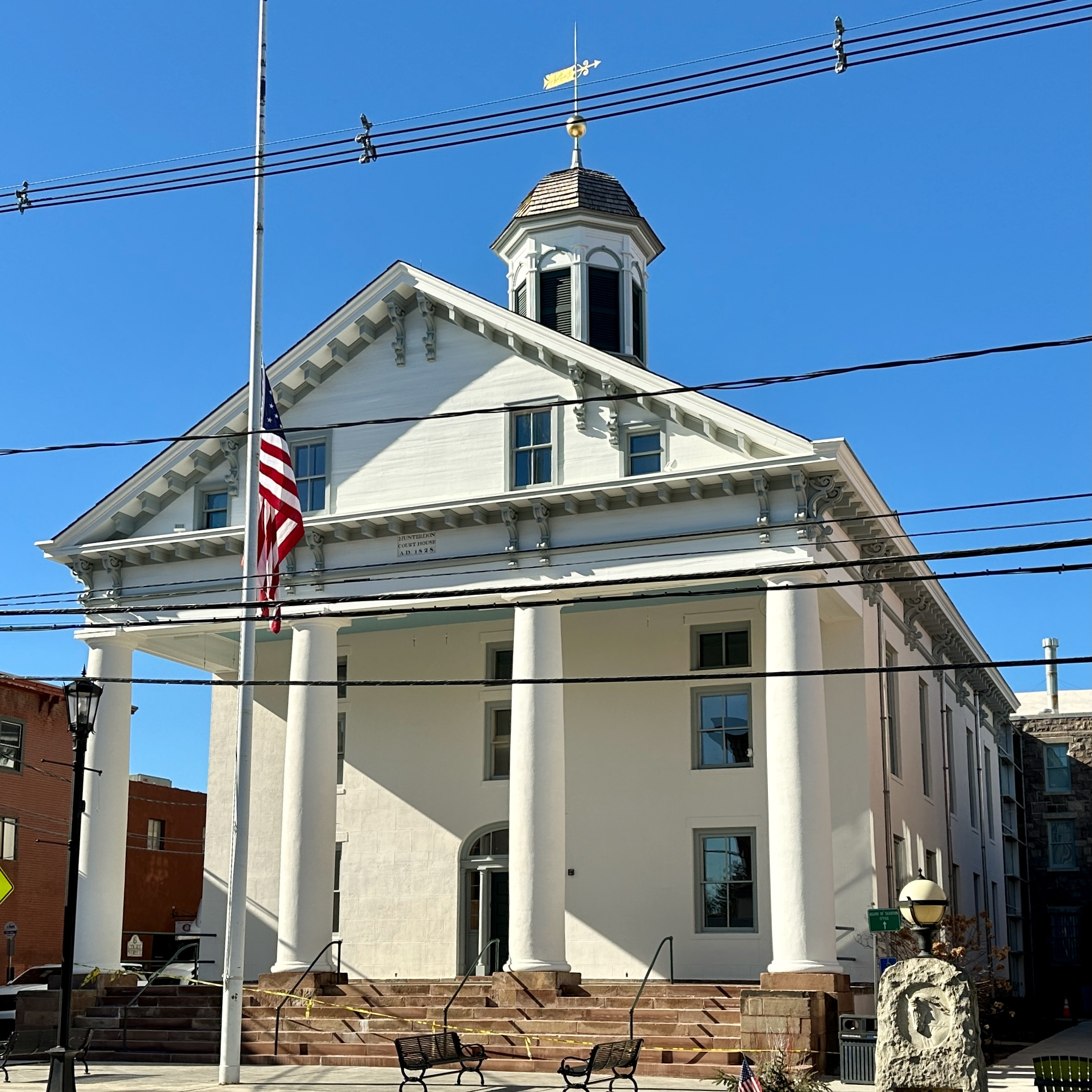

- Location within Hunterdon County, New Jersey Location within New Jersey Location within the United States
- Location: Corner of Main and Court streets, Flemington, New Jersey
- Coordinates: 40.5104°N 74.8593°W
- Built: 1828
- Architectural style: Greek Revival
- Part of: Flemington Historic District (ID80002493)
- NJRHP No.: 79

Significant dates
- Designated CP: September 17, 1980
- Designated NJRHP: June 2, 1997

The Hunterdon County Courthouse is an historic site located in Flemington, the county seat of Hunterdon County, New Jersey, United States, that is best known as the site of the 1935 "Trial of the Century" of Bruno Hauptmann and his conviction and sentence of death for his role in the Lindbergh kidnapping.

== Construction ==
While Hunterdon County was established in 1714, the first courthouse in the county was built in 1791, replacing a facility that existed in Trenton, in Mercer County. This first courthouse lasted until it was destroyed by fire in 1828, with arson the suspected cause.

The current courthouse was built in 1828 on the site of the original facility, with stone from the first building used to construct the jail behind the courthouse. The jail was used until 1985 when it was replaced by a new county jail; the courthouse remained in use until 1996 when a new justice center was opened.

== "Trial of the Century" ==
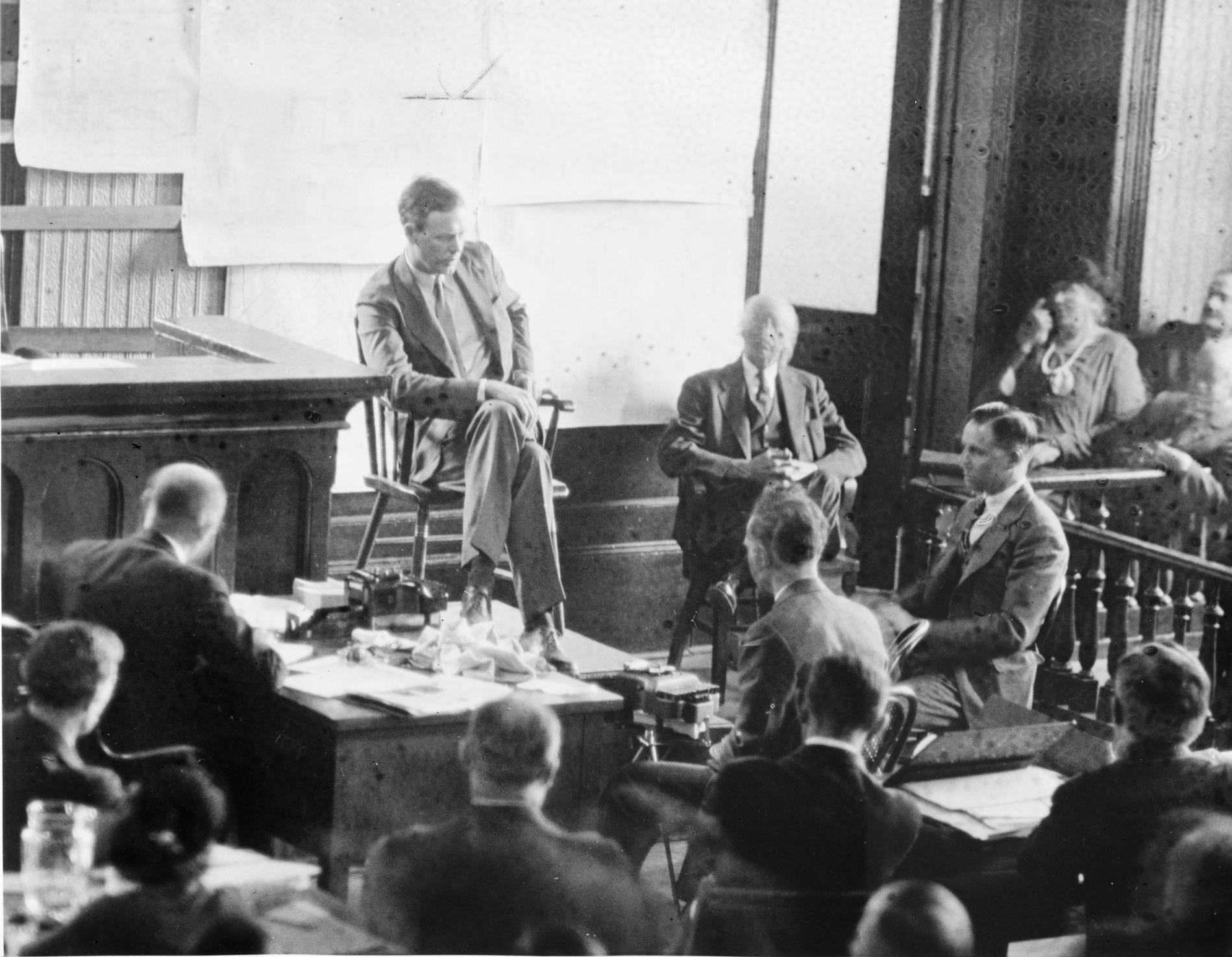
Lindbergh on the witness stand

The trial of Hauptmann attracted sightseers to the courthouse and the attached jail. In October 1934, The New York Times reported that the courthouse was drawing hundreds of curious spectators.

Edward J. Reilly was hired by the Daily Mirror to serve as Hauptmann's attorney. Two other lawyers, Lloyd Fisher and Frederick Pope, were co-counselors. David T. Wilentz, New Jersey Attorney General, led the prosecution.

In addition to Hauptmann's possession of the ransom money, the State introduced evidence showing a strong similarity between Hauptmann's handwriting and the handwriting on the ransom notes. The State also introduced photographic evidence demonstrating that the wood from the ladder left at the crime scene matched a plank from the floor of Hauptmann's attic. Condon and Charles Lindbergh both testified that Hauptmann was "John". Another witness, Amandus Hockmuth, testified that he saw Hauptmann near the scene of the crime.

Hauptmann was ultimately convicted of the crimes and sentenced to death. His appeals were rejected, though New Jersey Governor Harold G. Hoffman granted a temporary reprieve of Hauptmann's execution and made the politically unpopular move of having the New Jersey Board of Pardons review the case, though the Board found no reason to overturn the verdict. He was electrocuted on April 3, 1936, just over four years after the kidnapping.

== Modern times ==
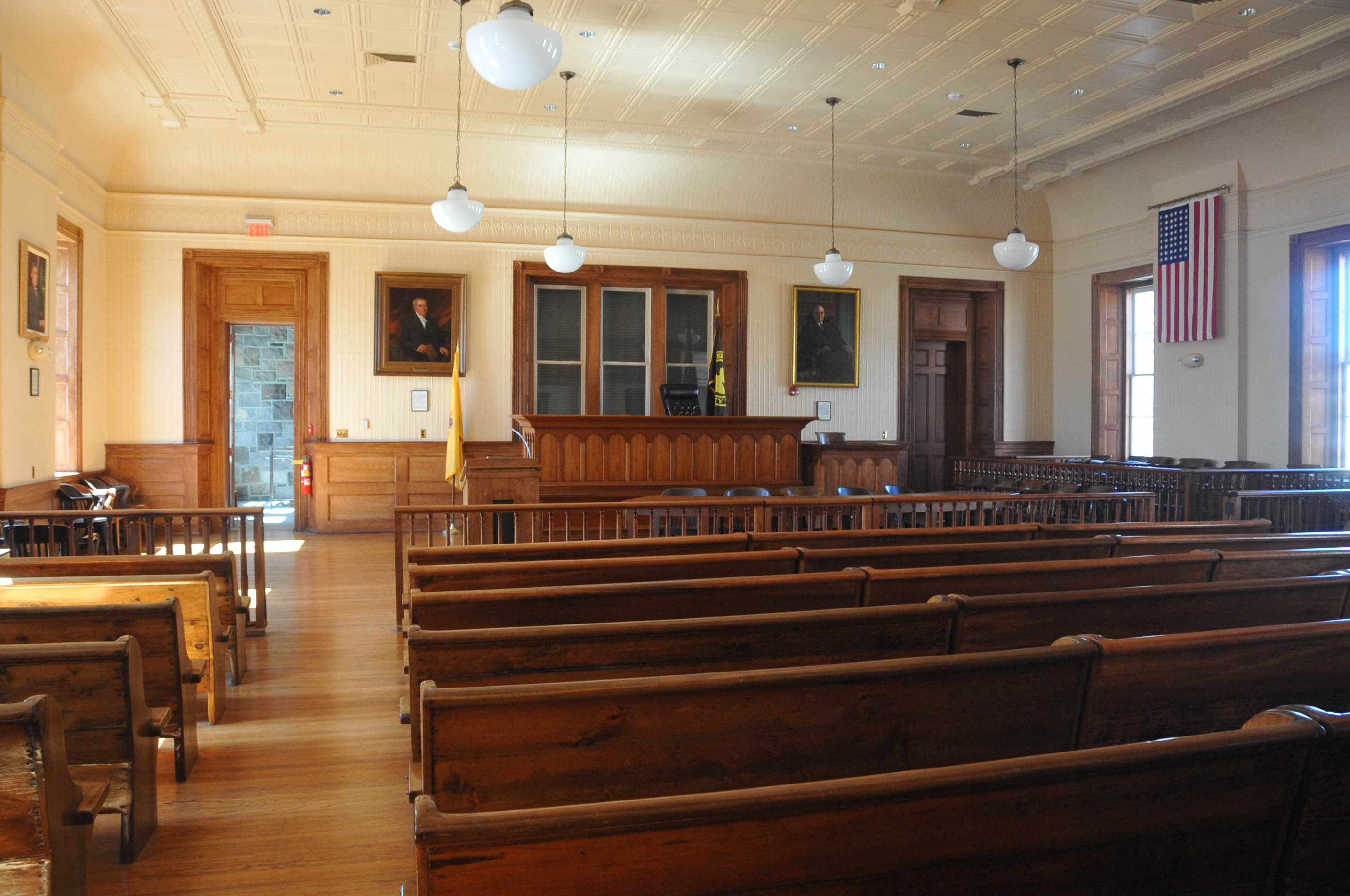

A matching grant of more than $500,000 for restoration, rehabilitation and stabilization of the site was received from the New Jersey Historic Trust in 1997, part of $11.5 million granted to 30 historic sites across the state, and the only site selected in Hunterdon County. It is part of the Flemington Historic District.

Artifacts from the courthouse remain on display, including the witness chair from the Lindbergh Kidnapping trial and hand-carved jury chairs The courthouse has been used for reenactments of the 1935 trial, including a 1994 presentation of the play Lindbergh and Hauptmann: The Trial of the Century.

== See also ==
- Courts of New Jersey
- County courthouses in New Jersey
- Federal courthouses in New Jersey
