= April 1972 =

Month of 1972

<<	April 1972					>>
Su	Mo	Tu	We	Th	Fr	Sa
						1
2	3	4	5	6	7	8
9	10	11	12	13	14	15
16	17	18	19	20	21	22
23	24	25	26	27	28	29
30

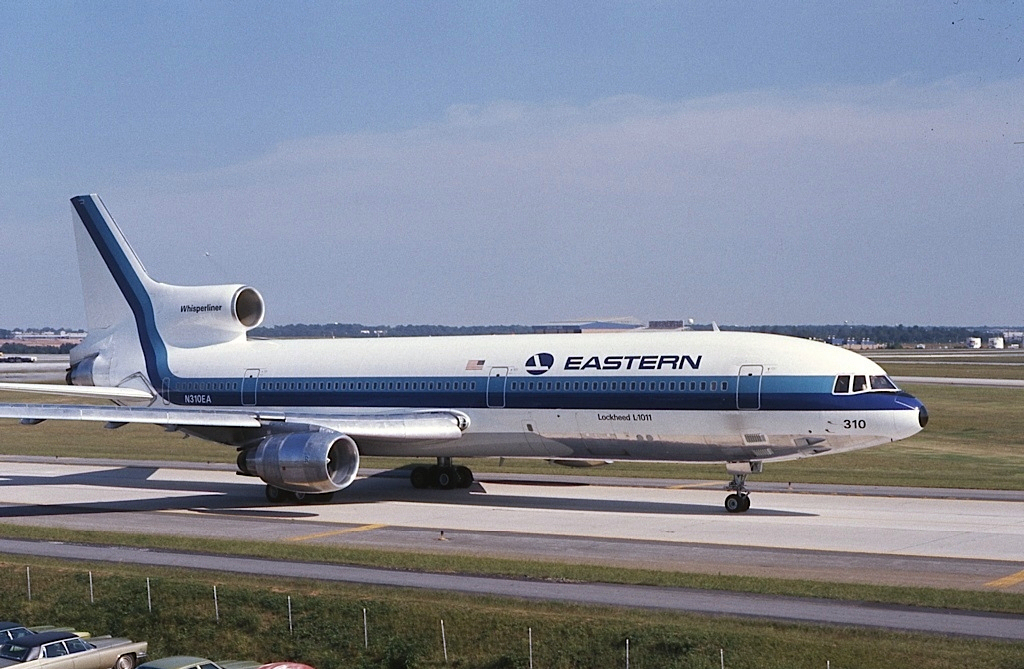
April 26, 1972: Lockheed L-1011 introduced

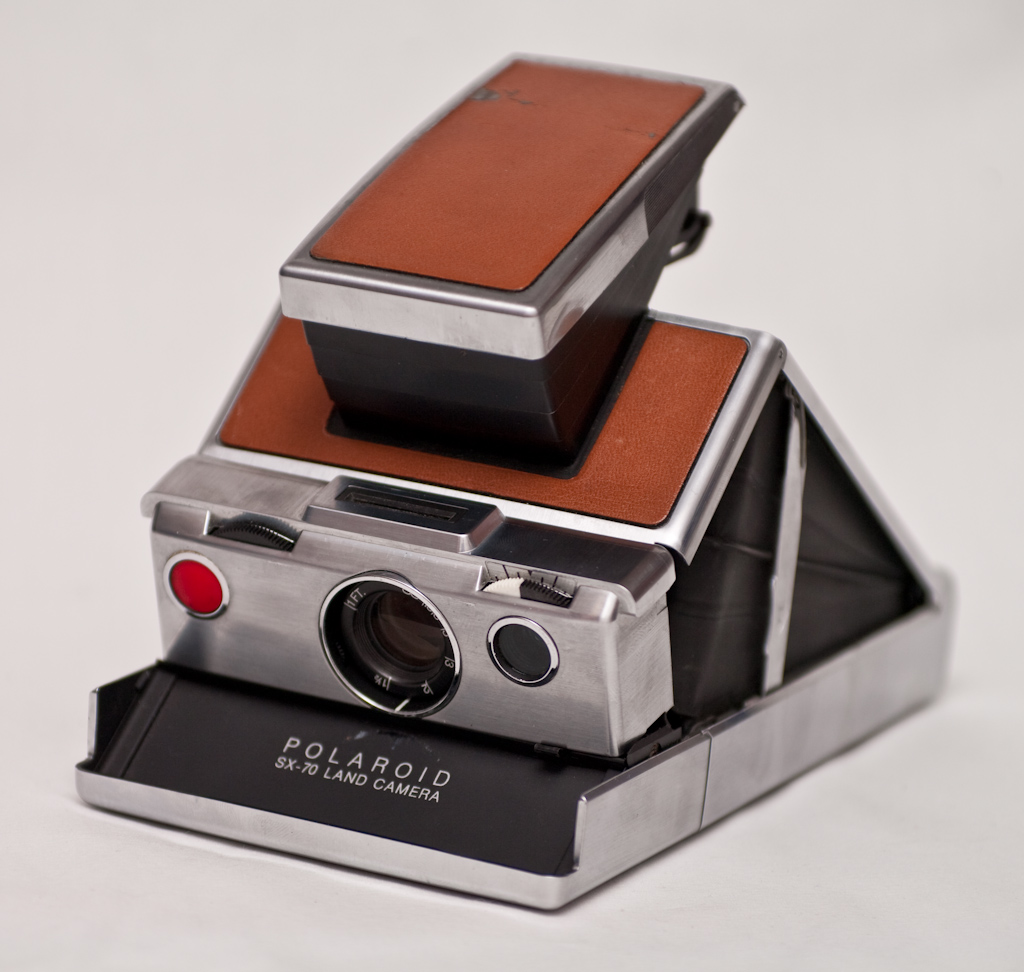
April 25, 1972: Polaroid introduces pictures that develop as you watch

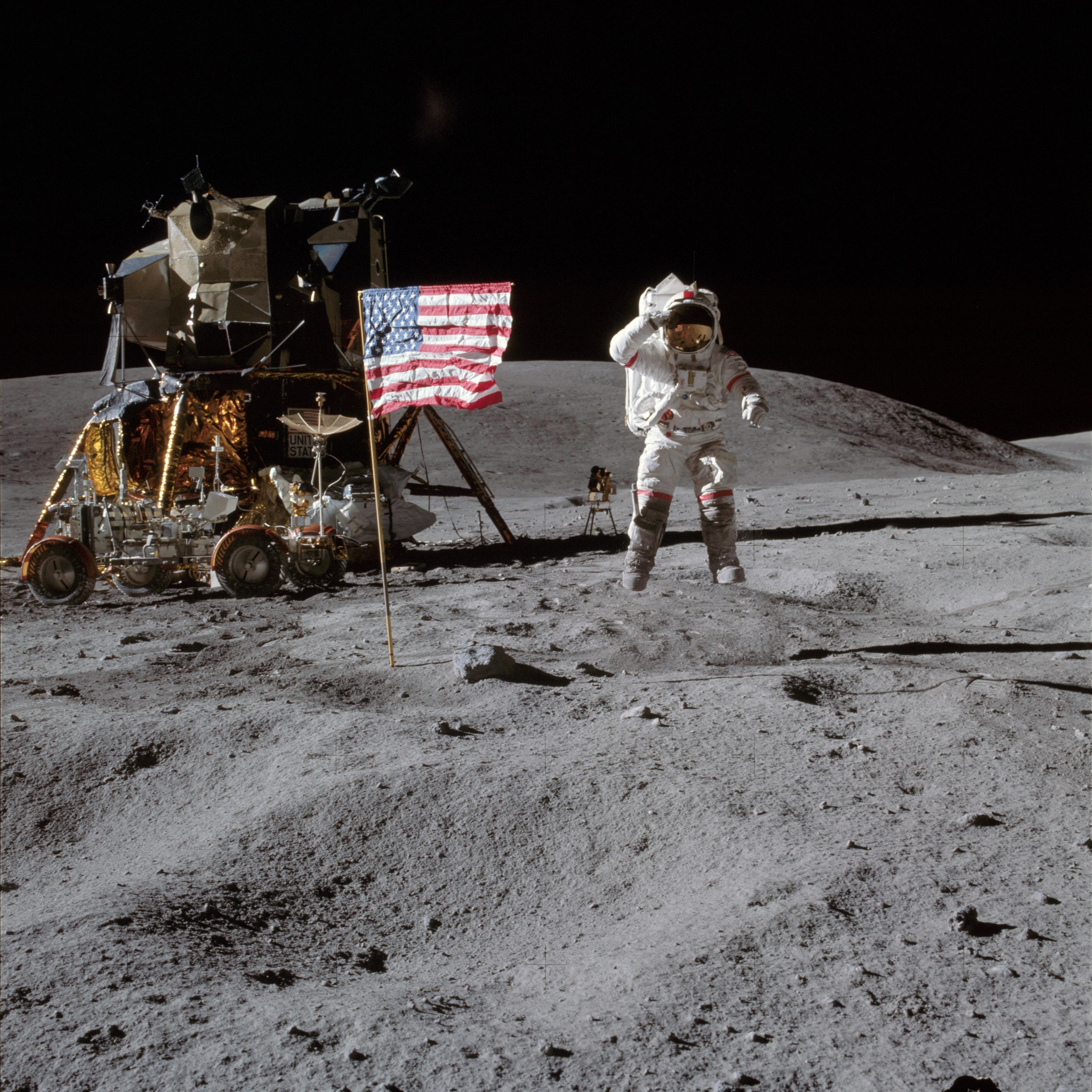
April 21, 1972: Apollo 16 makes the penultimate crewed flight to the Moon

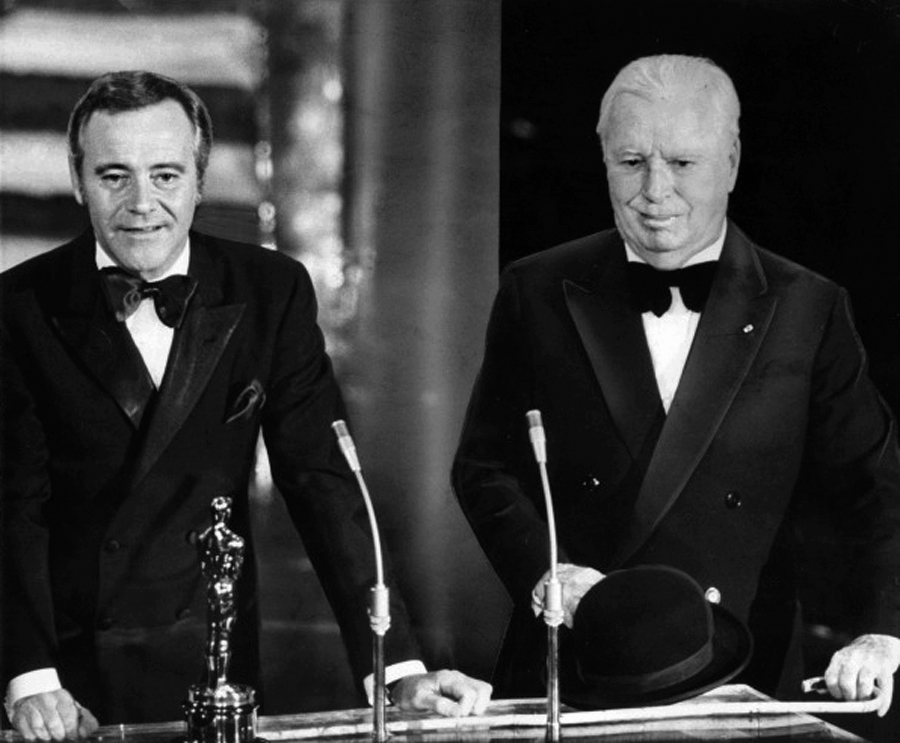
April 3, 1972: Charlie Chaplin (right) returns to the U.S. after 20 years

The following events occurred in April 1972:

== April 1, 1972 (Saturday) ==
- For the first time in history, all scheduled National League and American League games were called off by a strike. The MLBPA's representatives voted 47–0 to call a walkout in a dispute over player pensions. The remaining four days of exhibitions were cancelled, and the April 5 season openers were postponed. The strike was resolved by April 15.
- New Zealand law created the Accident Compensation Corporation, which eliminated personal injury lawsuits in favor of an insurance system that compensates injured persons regardless of fault.

== April 2, 1972 (Sunday) ==
- Lt. Col. Iceal Hambleton, a USAF navigator with a background in ballistic missile technology and missile countermeasures, was the sole survivor of an EB-66 shot down behind enemy lines during the Easter Offensive of the Vietnam War. If he was captured, he would be a propaganda and intelligence bonanza for the North Vietnamese and the Soviet Union.
- RTÉ Raidió na Gaeltachta, the second radio station in the Republic of Ireland (after RTÉ Radio 1) began broadcasting.
- Nigeria officially switched from the British-styled left-hand traffic (driving on the left side of the road) to right-hand traffic (driving on the right side).
- Died:
  - Gil Hodges, 47, New York Mets manager since 1968
  - Franz Halder, 87, German general, the chief of the OKH General Staff 1938–1942

== April 3, 1972 (Monday) ==
- Silent film legend Charlie Chaplin returned to the United States after more than 20 years of self-imposed exile. "The Little Tramp" had been invited back for the Academy Awards.
- The museum exhibit "Arabia Felix Archaeology" opened at the Smithsonian Institution's National Museum of Natural History, curated by Gus Van Beek, Curator of Old World Anthropology.
- U.S. Congressman Les Aspin sued the Department of Defense in District Court to release the Peers Commission investigation report on the 1968 My Lai Massacre.
- Born: Jennie Garth, American actress (Beverly Hills 90210); in Urbana, Illinois
- Died:
  - Ferde Grofé, 80, American composer
  - Alvin Crowder, 73, American baseball pitcher and American League wins leader in 1932 and 1933

== April 4, 1972 (Tuesday) ==
- The United States formally recognized Bangladesh three months after the latter's creation.
- Died:
  - Adam Clayton Powell Jr., 63, first black U.S. representative from New York from 1945 to 1971)
  - Hodding Carter, 65, progressive U.S. journalist

== April 5, 1972 (Wednesday) ==
- A tornado killed six people in Vancouver, Washington, an area generally immune from twisters. Striking at 12:51 p.m., the storm injured 70 children at Vancouver's Ogden Elementary School, but none of them fatally.

== April 6, 1972 (Thursday) ==
- In response to the invasion of South Vietnam by troops from the north, more than 400 American airplanes bombed North Vietnam in the heaviest attacks there since 1968.

== April 7, 1972 (Friday) ==
- United Airlines Flight 855 was hijacked en route from Newark to Los Angeles, and diverted to San Francisco, where the 85 passengers were released in exchange for $500,000 ransom and parachutes. After the 727 returned to the air, the skyjacker, Richard McCoy Jr. then bailed out a few miles south of Provo, Utah, from 16,000 feet (4,900 m). McCoy landed safely and hitchhiked home, and was not caught until two days later.
- The Federal Election Campaign Act (FECA) went into effect, 60 days after it had been signed into law by President Nixon.
- WBC titleholder Bob Foster knocked out WBA champ Vicente Rondon with five seconds left in the second round of their match at Miami Beach, to become the undisputed light heavyweight boxing champion of the world.
- Communist forces overran the South Vietnamese town of Loc Ninh.
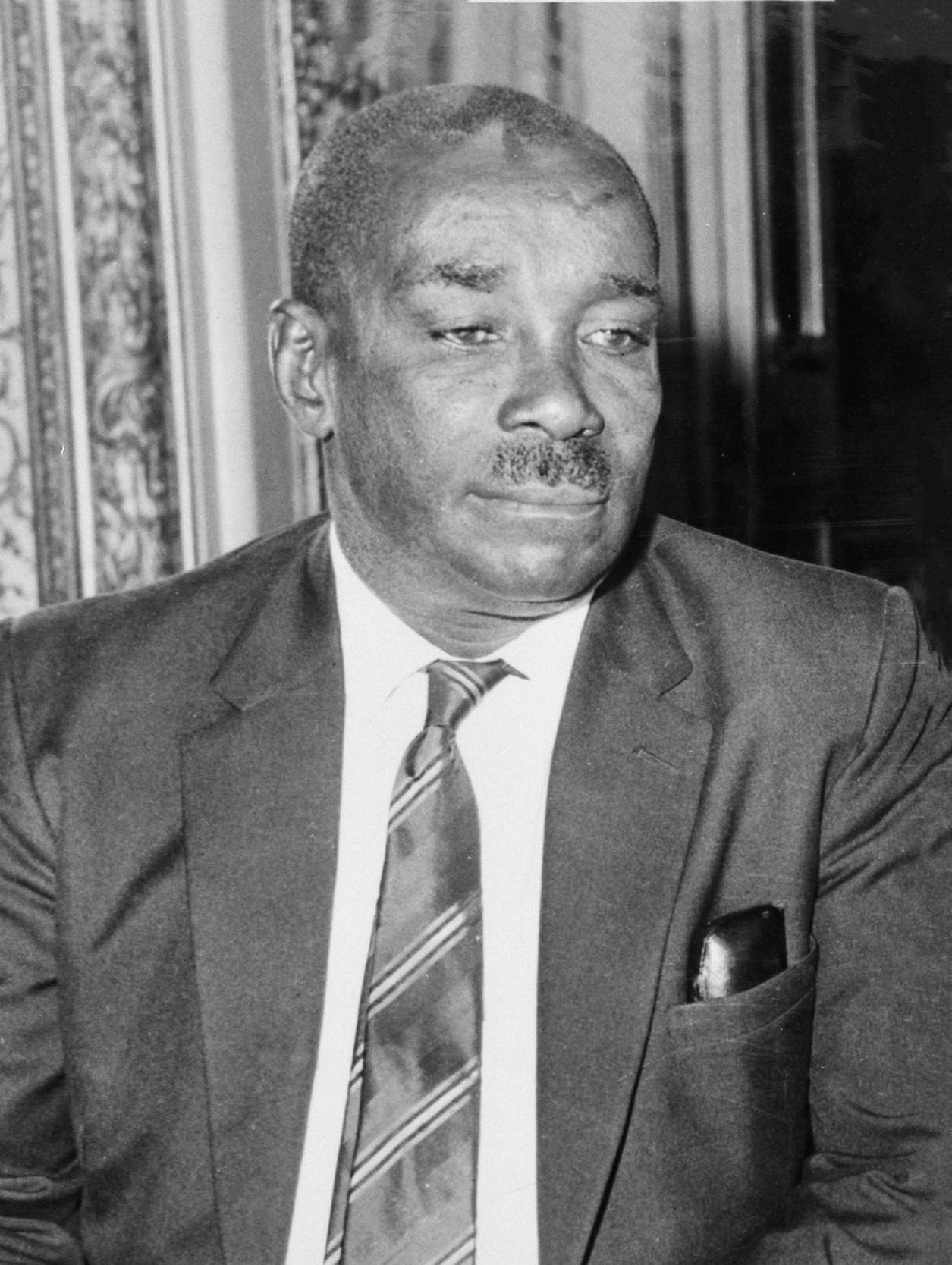
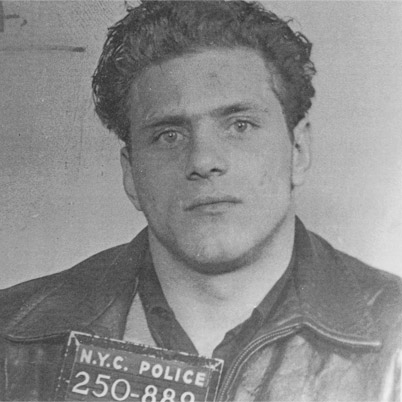
Dictator Karume, mobster Gallo, both assassinated
- Died:
  - Abeid Karume, 67, President of Zanzibar and Vice President of Tanzania, was assassinated by four men who invaded the Afro-Shirazi Party headquarters. Karume was succeeded by Zanzibar Vice President Aboud Jumbe.
  - Joey Gallo, 43, American mobster, was murdered while celebrating his birthday with a seafood dinner. Gallo and his family were at Umbertos Clam House on 132 Mulberry Street in New York City's Little Italy neighborhood.

== April 8, 1972 (Saturday) ==
- Kjell Isaksson of Sweden broke the world pole vault record held by Christos Papanikolaou, becoming the first person to vault higher than 5.5 meters (5.51 m or 18 feet 1 inch). The mark was set at the Texas Relays in Austin, Texas.

== April 9, 1972 (Sunday) ==
- The Iraqi-Soviet Treaty of Friendship and Co-operation was signed in Baghdad, for a term of 15 years, after which the USSR supplied increased military aid to Iraq, as part of an agreement "to develop their cooperation in the matter of strengthening their defence capacity".

== April 10, 1972 (Monday) ==
- United States President Richard Nixon and Soviet head of state Nikolai Podgorny signed the Biological Weapons Convention, in their respective capitals of Washington and Moscow. Representatives from 74 other nations signed the treaty at the Washington ceremony.
- At 5:36 in the morning local time (0206 UTC), the 6.7 M_{w} Qir earthquake shook southern Iran with a maximum Mercalli intensity of IX (Violent), killing thousands of people in the province of Fars. The final death toll was listed as 5,374. The majority of the deaths were in the town of Qir, where two thirds of its residents (3,399 of 5,068) were killed.
- The body of Oberdan Sallustro, the general manager of FIAT operations in Argentina, was found near Buenos Aires, 20 days after he had been kidnapped by the People's Revolutionary Army. On the same day, the terrorist organization assassinated General Juan Carlos Sanchez as he was being driven to his office in Rosario.
- Fifteen mountain climbers were killed by an avalanche while attempting to climb Manaslu, the world's eighth tallest mountain (26,752 feet). The South Korean financed expedition consisted of four Koreans, a Japanese cameraman, and their ten Nepalese Sherpa guides.
- The city of Fujimi was founded in Japan.
- Born: Gordon Buchanan, Scottish wildlife filmmaker; in Dumbarton, West Dunbartonshire

== April 11, 1972 (Tuesday) ==
- For the first time, the deliberations of the United States bishops of the Roman Catholic Church were opened to the press. Seventy-five reporters were invited to the meeting, held in Atlanta. Cardinal John Krol then delivered his speech in Latin. Cardinal Krol told reporters, "We told you we'd let you in. We didn't tell you what language we'd talk."
- Born: Jason Varitek, MLB catcher, 1994 winner of the Dick Howser Trophy for best player in college baseball; in Rochester, Michigan
- Died: George H. Plympton, 82, American screenwriter

== April 12, 1972 (Wednesday) ==
- The table tennis team from the People's Republic of China arrived in Detroit to begin their tour of the United States. An American team had been welcomed to China one year earlier, on April 10, 1971.
- Born: Marco Goecke, German choreographer; in Wuppertal, West Germany.

== April 13, 1972 (Thursday) ==
- The United States Senate voted 68–16 to approve the War Powers Act, which would limit the power of the President to commit American forces to hostilities without Congressional approval. The legislation then moved on to the House.
- The first destruction of an enemy tank by Cobra attack helicopter was made by CW2 Barry McIntyre, in the course of the Battle of An Loc. The maneuverable and destructive Cobras were able to stop entire columns of North Vietnamese tanks, and turned the course of the Easter Offensive.
- Lt. Col. Iceal Hambleton, a USAF EB-66 navigator who had been shot down on April 2, was rescued. He had spent 11½ days behind enemy lines. During the rescue operation, five aircraft were shot down, eleven U.S. servicemen were killed, and two men were captured. The rescue operation was the "largest, longest, and most complex search-and-rescue" operation during the entire Vietnam War.
- The television show My Three Sons broadcast its 380th, and final, original episode. The last prime-time rerun was on August 24, 1972.

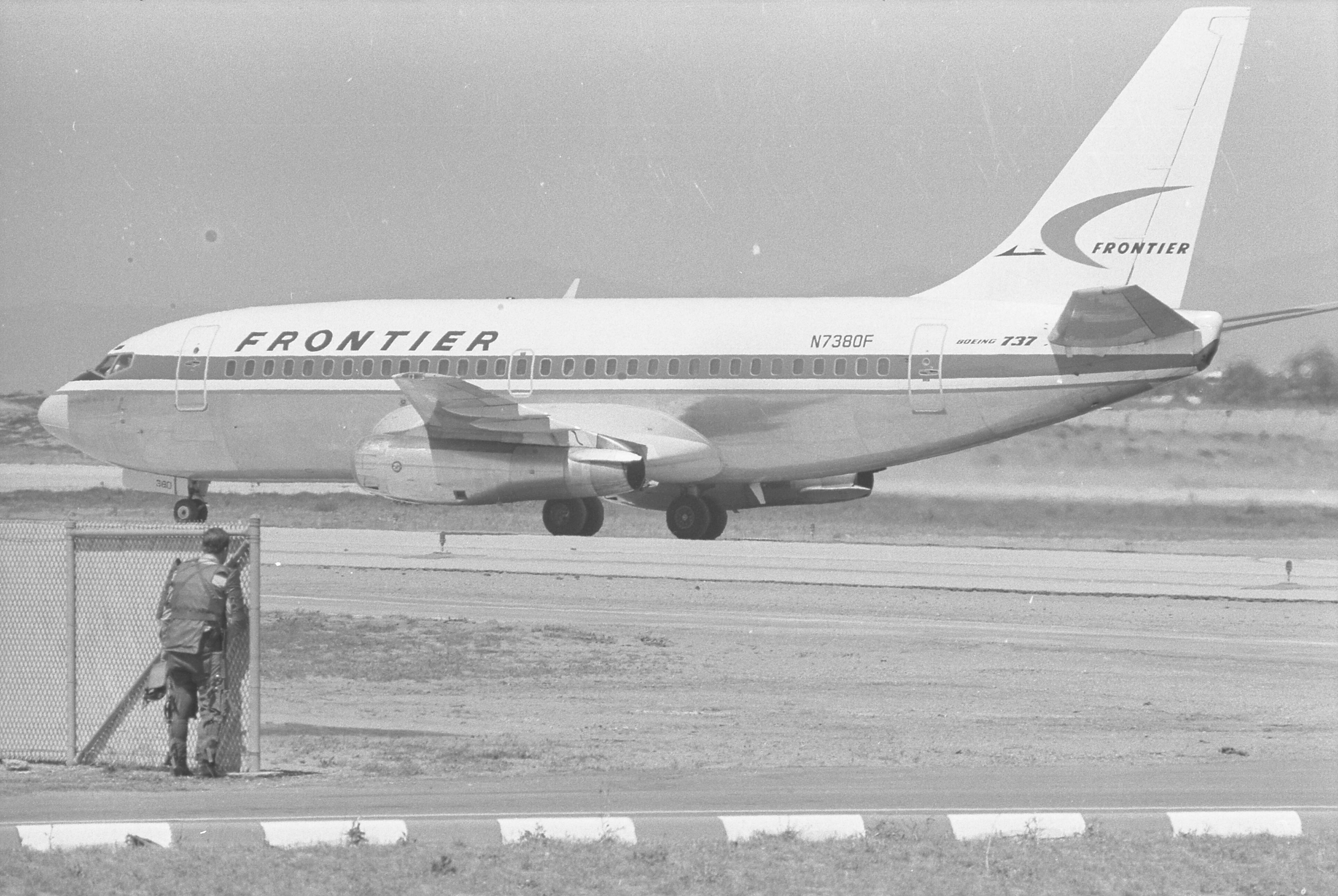
Hijacked Frontier Airlines Aircraft at LAX

- Frontier Airlines Flight 91, a Boeing 737-200, was Hijacked by Chicano Activist Ricardo Chavez Ortiz shortly after takeoff from Albuquerque, New Mexico and was forced to land in Los Angeles.

== April 14, 1972 (Friday) ==
- On what would become known as "Bloody Friday", the IRA set off a wave of bombs in Belfast, starting with 14 explosions in commemoration of the 14 dead during the "Bloody Sunday Massacre". At least twenty bombs exploded in the space of eighty minutes, most within a half hour period. Nine people were killed.
- The Grateful Dead played their first paying concert, in front of a foreign language crowd, in Copenhagen, Denmark at the Tivolis Koncertsa.

== April 15, 1972 (Saturday) ==
- The Great Lakes Water Quality Agreement was signed in Ottawa by President Nixon of the United States and Prime Minister Trudeau of Canada.
- After a ten-day strike postponement, the 1972 Major League Baseball season opened, including the Detroit Tigers' 3–2 win over the Boston Red Sox. Cancellations were not rescheduled, and teams played an uneven number (154, 155 or 156) games, an imbalance that allowed Detroit Tigers (86–70) to clinch the AL East pennant a game ahead of Boston (85–70).
- A "state of internal war" was declared in Uruguay by vote of the General Assembly, the day after the Tupamaros renewed their attacks on government officials. The legislature voted to give President Bordaberry emergency powers, and the Uruguayan military began its rule of the South American nation.
- Born: Arturo Gatti, Canadian boxer, IBF lightweight boxer 1995-1998, and WBC super lightweight champion 2004-2005; in Montreal (died by suicide or murder, 2009)
- Died: Joe McCann, 24, Irish Republican Army paramilitary officer, suspected in the attempted assassination of the Northern Ireland Minister for Home Affairs, John Taylor, was shot to death by members of the Royal Ulster Constabulary who were later charged with, but acquitted of murder.

== April 16, 1972 (Sunday) ==
North America on April 16, 1972, taken during Apollo 16.

- Ling-Ling and Hsing-Hsing, the first giant pandas in the United States, arrived at the National Zoo in Washington, D.C., as a gift from the People's Republic of China. The two pandas attracted millions of visitors during their lifetimes. Ling-Ling lived until 1992 and her mate survived until 1999.
- For the first time since the Vietnam War had started, Haiphong, the largest port in North Vietnam, was bombed by American forces. The wave of B-52 runs began at dawn in retaliation for the North's invasion of South Vietnam.
- Jane Blalock won the inaugural Dinah Shore Colgate Winner's Circle in Rancho Mirage, California. The Dinah Shore would become one of the LPGA Tour's major golf championships in 1983.
- Apollo 16 was launched at 12:54 pm EST.
- Born: Conchita Martínez, Spanish tennis player who won the Wimbledon women's singles title in 1994; in Barcelona
- Died: Yasunari Kawabata, 72, Japanese writer, 1968 Nobel Prize in Literature winner, committed suicide

== April 17, 1972 (Monday) ==
- The Ford Motor Company announced the recall of all of its 1972 model year Ford Torino and Mercury Montego automobiles—436,000 cars in all—to correct a defect in the rear axles. The following week, the company ordered a second recall of the vehicles for further repairs.
- Born:
  - Jennifer Garner, American TV actress, 2002 Golden Globe award for Alias; in Houston
  - Muttiah Muralitharan, Sri Lankan cricketer known for having taken more wickets in international cricket than any other bowler; in Kandy
  - Tony Boselli, NFL tackle with 5 Pro Bowl appearances; in Boulder, Colorado

== April 18, 1972 (Tuesday) ==
- East African Airways Flight 720 crashed and burned after an aborted takeoff in Addis Ababa, killing 43 of the 107 people on board. The VC-10 was bound for Rome, and many of its passengers were students returning to boarding schools after a holiday.

== April 19, 1972 (Wednesday) ==
- Four American warships were attacked by three MiG-17 jets from North Vietnam. The destroyers USS Higbee and Lloyd Thomas, the guided missile frigate USS Sterett, and the light cruiser USS Oklahoma City were attacked, with the Higbee having a gun mount destroyed by a 250 kg bomb, and four sailors wounded.
- The first organized storm chasing took place when a team, led by Rodger Brown of the National Severe Storms Laboratory, drove toward a mesocyclone near Davis, Oklahoma, to collect data. The Tornado Intercept Project was created by the NSSL and the University of Oklahoma.
- Born: Rivaldo (Rivaldo Vítor Borba Ferreira), Brazilian footballer who appeared in 74 matches for the Brazil national team; in Paulista

== April 20, 1972 (Thursday) ==
- American presidential adviser Henry Kissinger arrived in Moscow on a secret mission to meet with Soviet leader Leonid Brezhnev and Foreign Minister Andrei Gromyko. Kissinger's remained until Monday, and his visit was not announced until the day after his return.
- Born:
  - Carmen Electra (stage name for Tara Leigh Patrick) American TV and film actress known for Baywatch and for the Scary Movie series of film parodies; in Sharonville, Ohio
  - Lê Huỳnh Đức, Vietnamese footballer with 60 caps for the Vietnam national team; in Saigon, South Vietnam

== April 21, 1972 (Friday) ==
- American astronauts John W. Young and Charles Duke became the ninth and tenth people to walk on the Moon, after the lunar module Orion had landed as part of the Apollo 16 mission. The mission was the only one to the lunar highlands, near the Descartes crater.
- Sweden passed the world's first law officially recognizing change of gender, with the amendment, effective July 1, of civil registration rules to accommodate change of birth registrations for individuals who had undergone, or applied to have, sex change surgery.

== April 22, 1972 (Saturday) ==
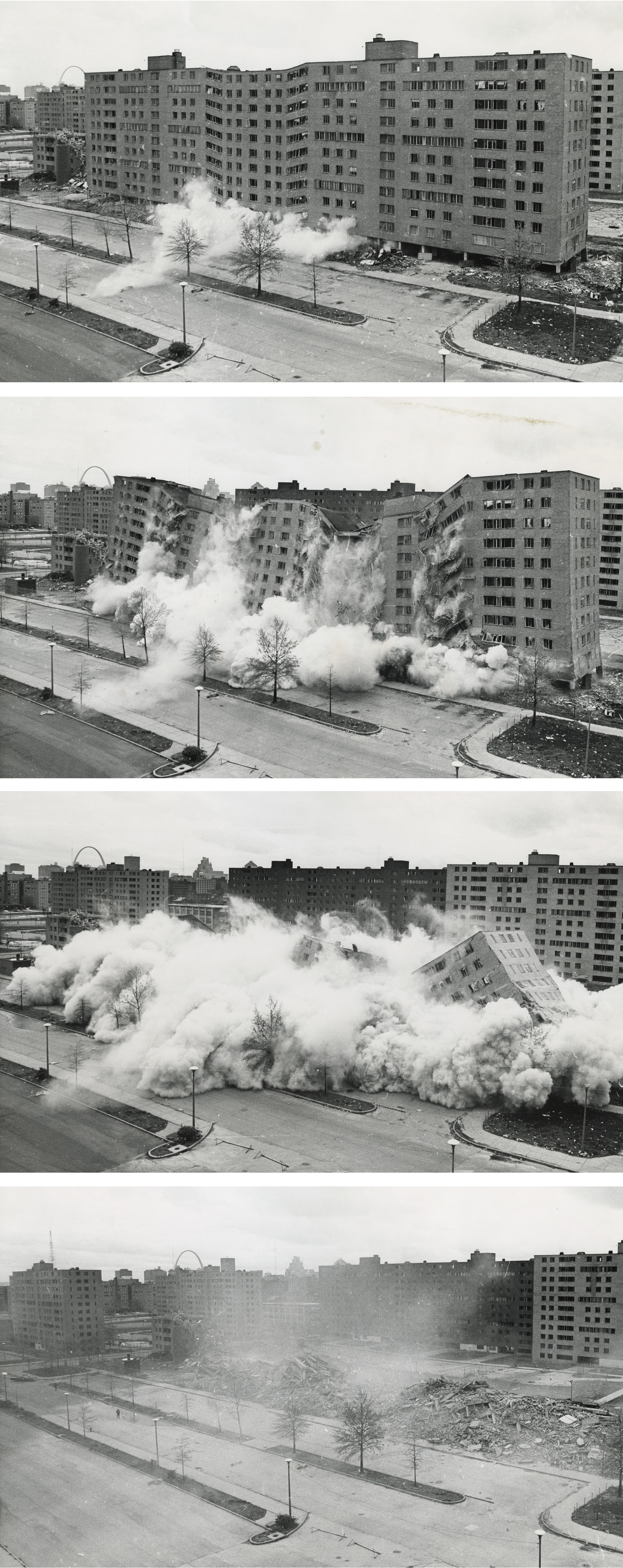
April 22, 1972. The second, widely televised demolition of a Pruitt-Igoe building that followed the March 16 demolition.

- Sir Rudolf Bing retired as the manager of "The Met", the Metropolitan Opera in New York City after 22 years, ending the era with a gala concert.
- The second set of buildings in the Pruitt–Igoe complex in St. Louis were demolished, and the process was filmed. Film clips of the demolition have been shown ever since, most notably as part of the film Koyaanisqatsi.

== April 23, 1972 (Sunday) ==
- In a referendum in France, voters approved the treaty adding Britain, Ireland and Denmark into the Common Market, with more than 68% in favor.

== April 24, 1972 (Monday) ==
- At Basel, the six member states of the European Economic Community agreed to create a currency exchange rate system nicknamed the snake in the tunnel. Fluctuation of intra-EEC rates would not vary by more than ±1.25%, in order to maintain a consistent rate of exchange against the American dollar.
- The UNESCO Convention on the Means of Prohibiting and Preventing the Illicit Import, Export and Transfer of Ownership of Cultural Property went into effect.
- Born: Chipper Jones (Larry Wayne Jones Jr.), MLB third baseman, 1999 National League MVP; in DeLand, Florida

== April 25, 1972 (Tuesday) ==
- Photographs that developed "right before your eyes" were introduced when Edwin H. Land of the Polaroid Corporation demonstrated the SX-70 film and camera.
- Ralph Baer was issued U.S. Patent No. 3,659,285 for "A Television Gaming Apparatus and Method", which he had perfected on May 7, 1967, making possible the home videogame industry.
- Richard Nixon and Henry Kissinger secretly discussed strategy in attacking North Vietnam. After Kissinger estimated that taking out dikes would "drown about 200,000 people", Nixon responded, "I'd rather use a nuclear bomb. Have you got that?" When Kissinger responded "That, I think, would just be too much..", Nixon said, "I just want you to think big, Henry, for Chrissake." The tape of the conversation was released years later.
- On the occasion of North Korean general secretary Kim Il Sung's 60th birthday, the North Korean government unveiled a 20 m (66 ft) bronze statue of Kim, painted in gold, the first of several monuments on Mansudae, the hill overlooking Pyongyang and the River Taedong, and new Korean Revolution Museum.
- The New York Times first published the front-page story of Frank Serpico, the honest cop fighting corruption within the NYPD.
- Died: George Sanders, 65, British actor, committed suicide

== April 26, 1972 (Wednesday) ==
- The Lockheed L-1011, a competitor to the Boeing 747 and the DC-10, was introduced, with Eastern Airlines purchasing the first of the new jets.
- Born: Avi Nimni, Israeli footballer with 80 caps for the Israel national team; in Tel Aviv
- Died: Fernando Amorsolo, 79, Philippine painter

== April 27, 1972 (Thursday) ==
- West Germany's Chancellor Willy Brandt faced a vote on the rarely used konstruktives misstrauensvoltum (constructive vote of no confidence) that permits the Bundestag to remove the Chancellor. The vote was called by opposition leader Rainer Barzel, and required 249 of 498 in favor of removal. The resolution received only 247 yes votes, falling two short.
- Edmund S. Muskie, the early favorite for the 1972 Democratic Party nomination for president, announced that he was dropping out of the race.
- Alene B. Duerk was named as the first female admiral in the history of the United States Navy.
- Born: Wellesley Wild, American screenwriter, producer, and voice actor; in New York City.
- Died: Kwame Nkrumah, 62, who served as the first President of Ghana from 1960 to 1966

== April 28, 1972 (Friday) ==
- An astronomer with the Lawrence Livermore National Laboratory announced the possible discovery of a tenth planet. Joseph L. Brady, relying on computer calculations of gravitational data, said that the planet would be larger than Saturn and more than five billion miles from the Sun. The possibility was ruled out after further study.
- The town of Winmalee, New South Wales, was established.
- Born: Violent J (stage name for Joseph Bruce), American rapper; in Berkley, Michigan

== April 29, 1972 (Saturday) ==
- An uprising in Burundi by the Hutu people against the Tutsi dominated government, began with machete attacks that killed more than 3,000 Tutsi civilians and soldiers. In the words of one observer, "the ferocity of the ensuing repression by the army was beyond imagination", with more than 100,000 Hutus being massacred over the next five months. In the genocide that followed, educated Hutu people—schoolchildren, college students, civil servants—were murdered, "especially anyone wearing glasses".

== April 30, 1972 (Sunday) ==
- Arthur Godfrey ended his broadcasting career with the final show of his CBS Radio Network program, Arthur Godfrey Time, which had run since 1945.
- Died: Ntare V, former King of Burundi, was executed after being persuaded to return to the African nation. Ntare had lived in exile in West Germany until coming back in March "under the impression he had received an amnesty" from the government of Michael Micombero, but was arrested as soon as he arrived and kept under house arrest in Gitenga. After a coup d'etat by monarchists, Ntare was put to death.
