= May 1972 =

Month of 1972

<<	May 1972					>>
Su	Mo	Tu	We	Th	Fr	Sa
	1	2	3	4	5	6
7	8	9	10	11	12	13
14	15	16	17	18	19	20
21	22	23	24	25	26	27
28	29	30	31

May 22, 1972: Ceylon renamed Sri Lanka

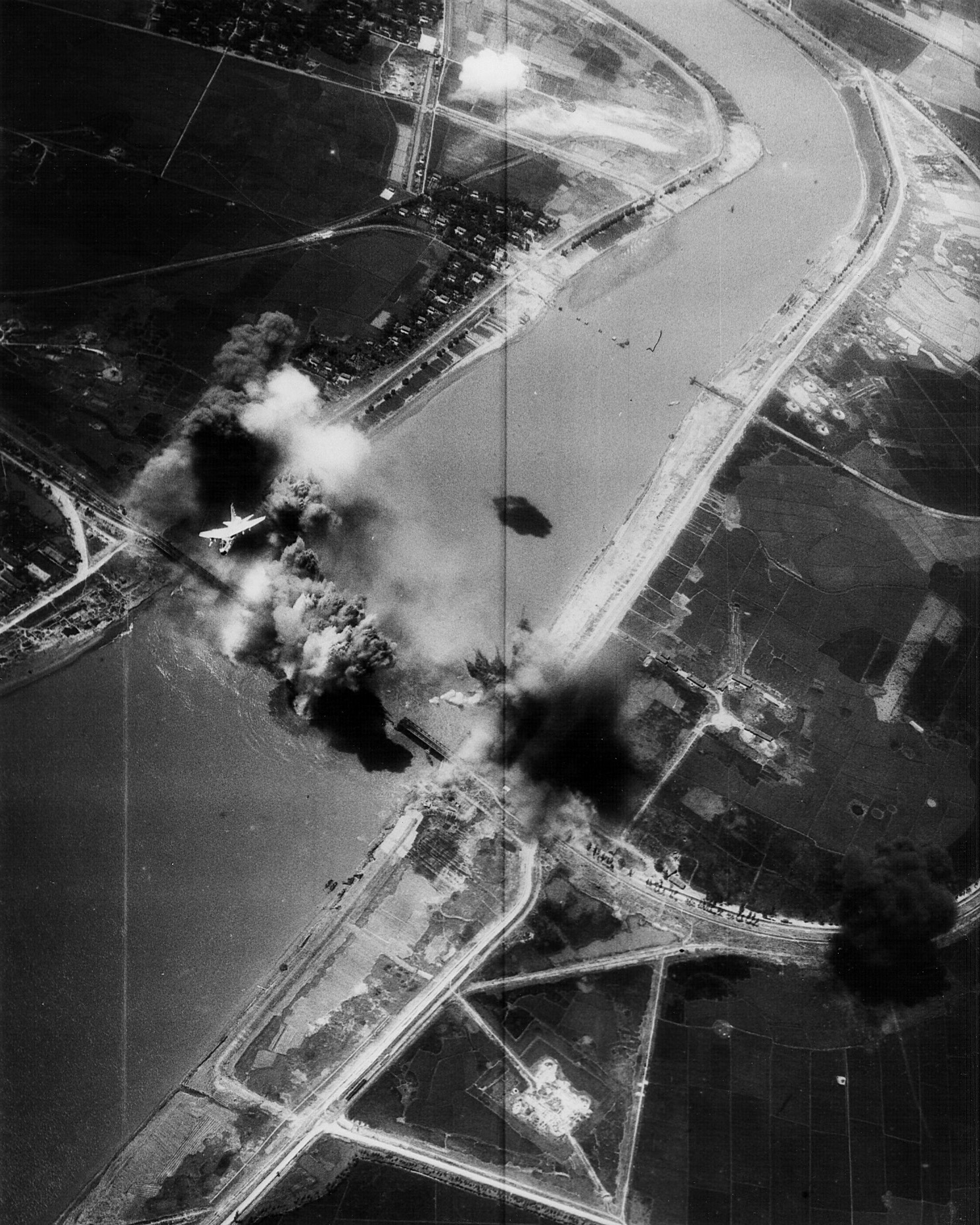
May 10, 1972: U.S. begins precision bombing of North Vietnam

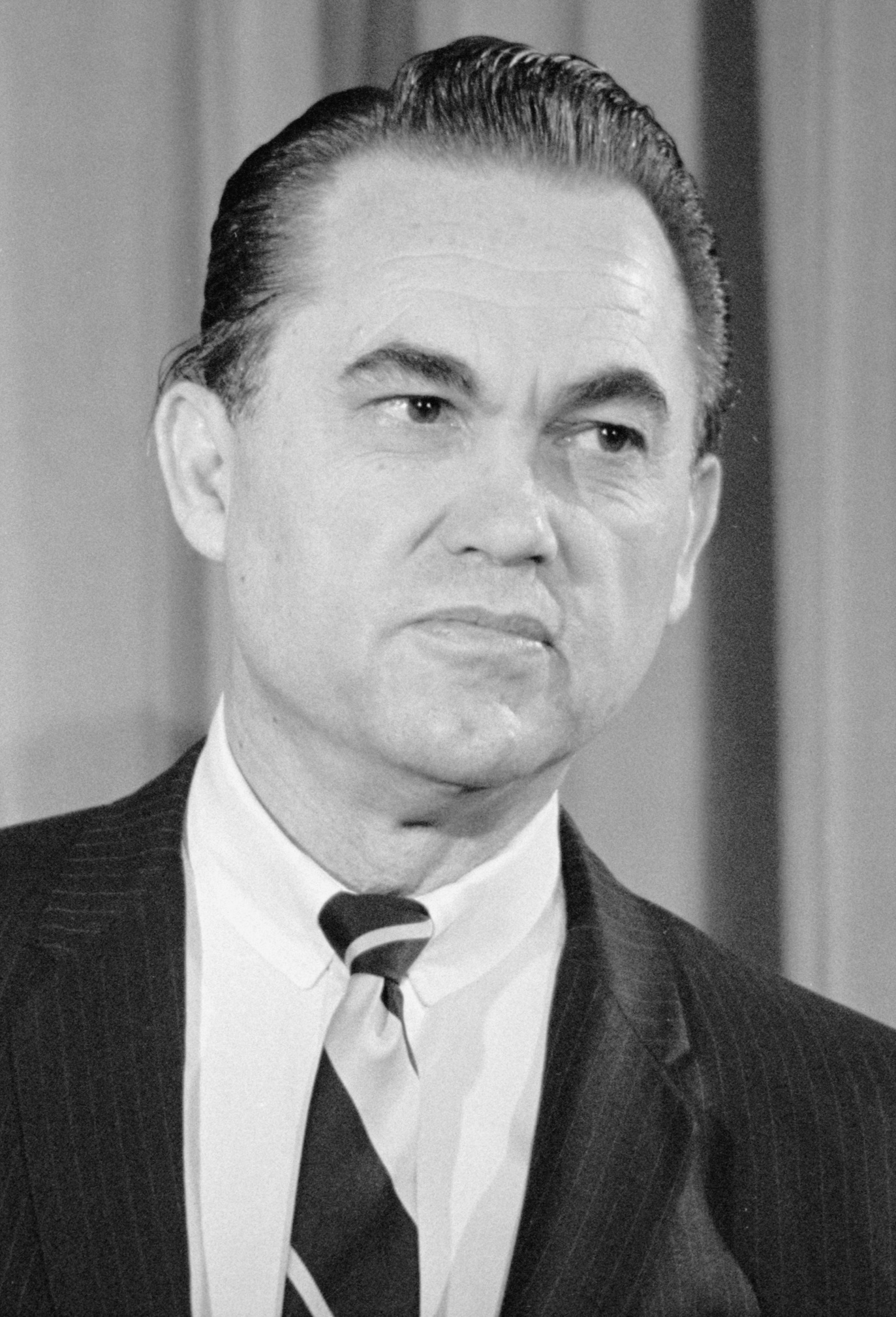
May 15, 1972: Wallace shot by assassin at campaign stop

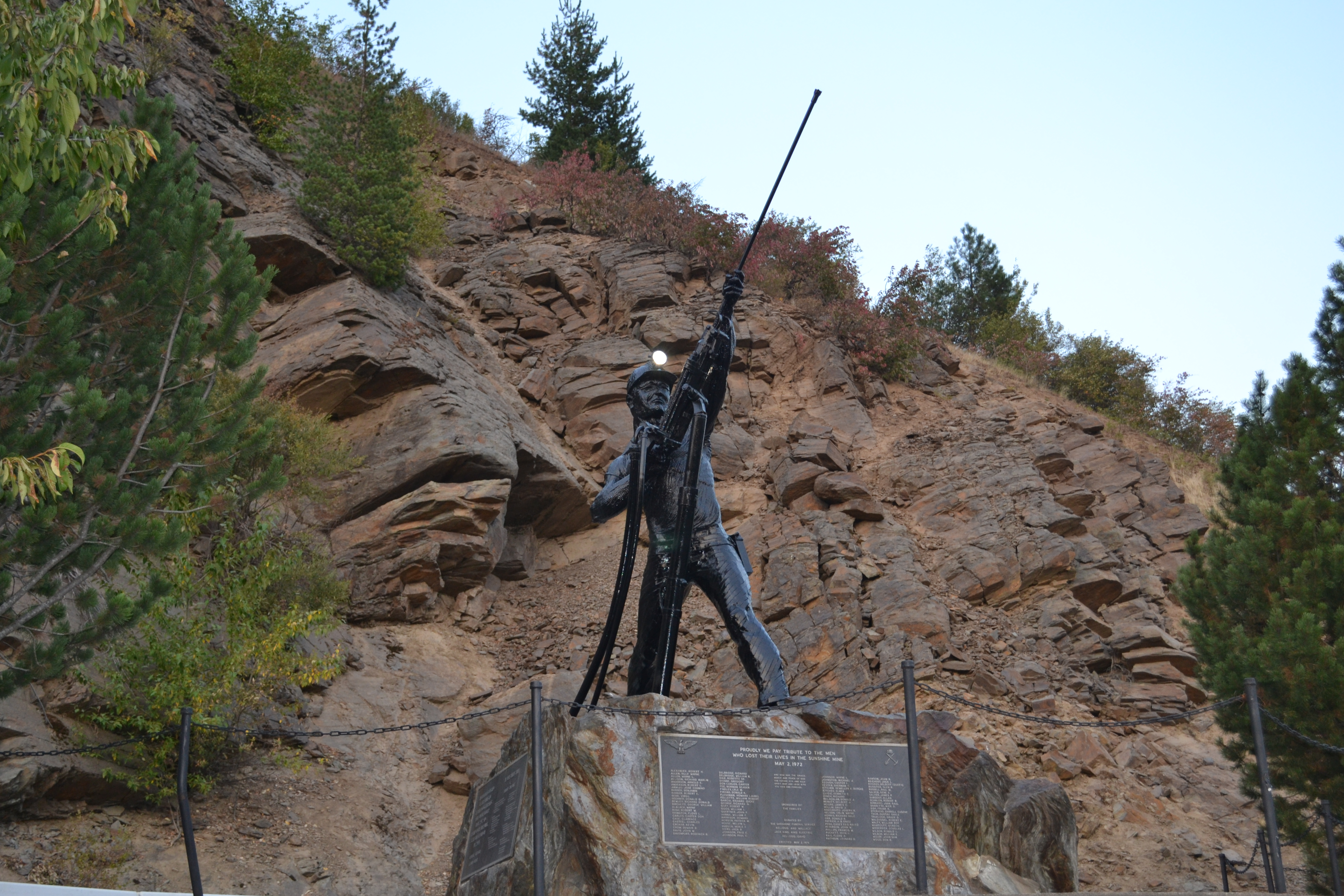
May 2, 1972: Ninety-one killed at Idaho's Sunshine Mine

The following events occurred in May 1972:

== May 1, 1972 (Monday) ==
- The North Vietnamese Army captured the South Vietnamese province and city of Quảng Trị.
- Hutu rebels in Burundi set up their own short-lived, "People's Republic of Martyazo", in the Bururi Province. The Tutsi-dominated Burundian Army ended the secession movement within two weeks, before beginning the slaughter of thousands of Hutus.
- British commercial diver Robert Taylor vomited and drowned while SCUBA diving from the drill ship Britannia to conduct routine maintenance in the North Sea.
- Born:
  - Julie Benz, American actress, in Pittsburgh
  - Ramzi bin al-Shibh, 9/11 conspirator, in Ghayl Bawazir, South Yemen

== May 2, 1972 (Tuesday) ==
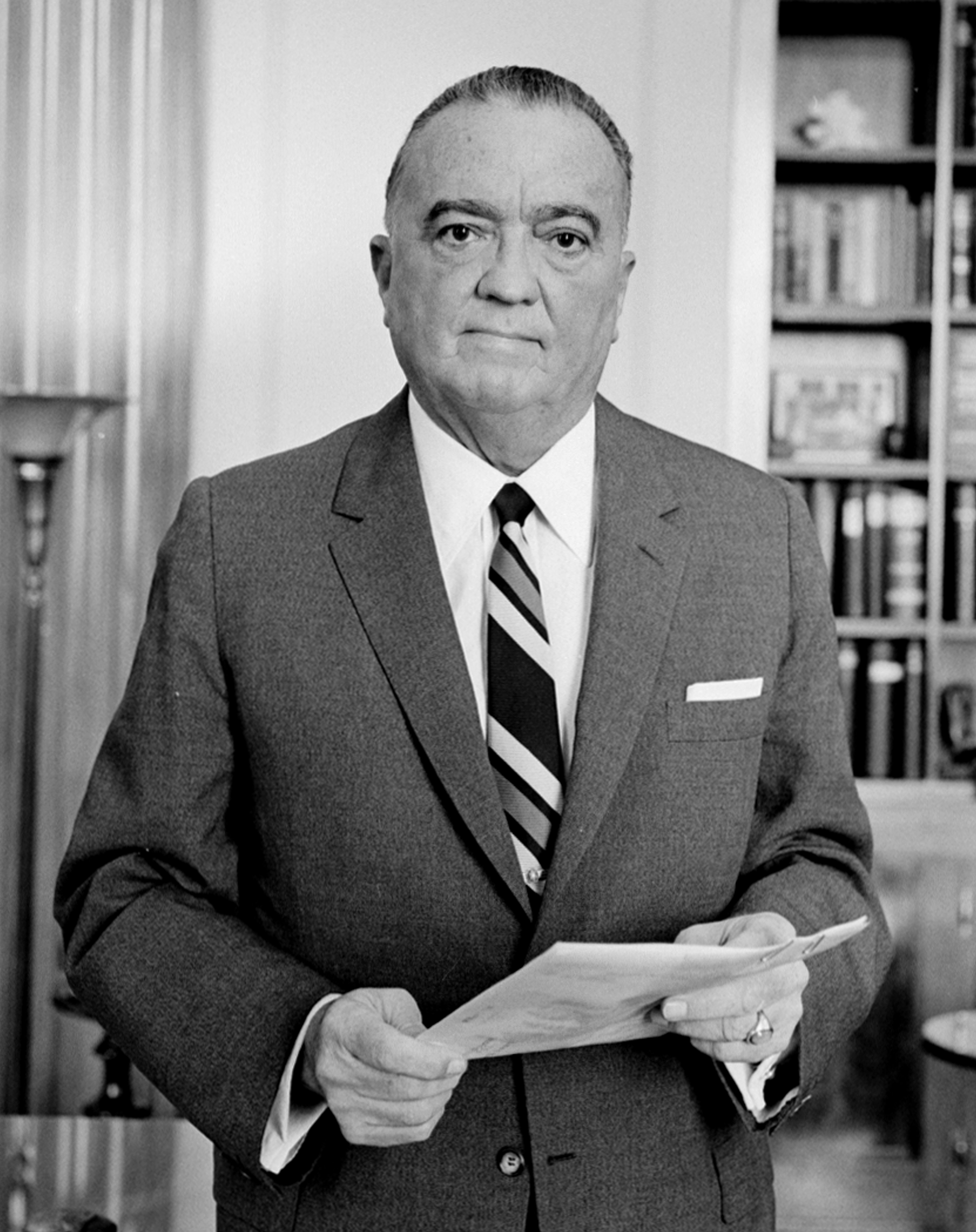
FBI Director J. Edgar Hoover (d. May 2, 1972)

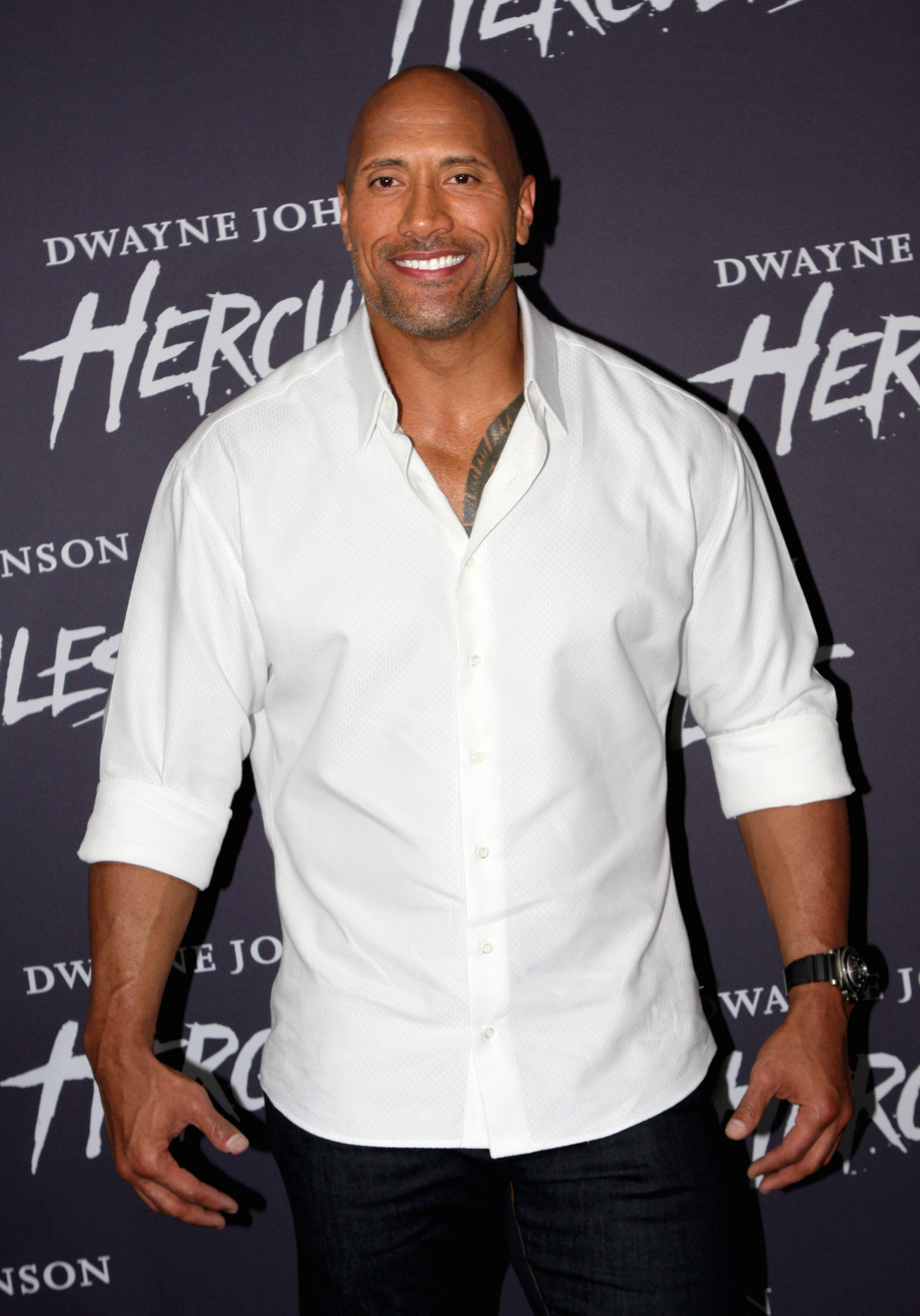
Film star and pro wrestler Dwayne "The Rock" Johnson (b. May 2, 1972)

- A fire killed 91 miners at the Sunshine Silver Mine near Kellogg, Idaho, 3,700 feet (1,100 m) underground. After the blaze started at 11:40 a.m., most of the miners were killed when the mine ventilation system and fans spread carbon monoxide. Another 82 were able to escape.
- U.S. Patent 3,659,915 was issued to Corning Glass, the first ever for fiber-optic cable.
- Elections were held in the West Bank cities of Bethlehem, Ramallah and Hebron for the first time since 1963. In 1967, Israel had extended the terms of the existing Palestinian council members indefinitely following the West Bank's capture from Jordan in the Six Day War. Voting had taken place on March 28 in five other Palestinian cities.
- Born: Dwayne Johnson, American actor and former professional wrestler, billed as "The Rock"; in Hayward, California
- Died: J. Edgar Hoover, 77, who had been Director of the Federal Bureau of Investigation since 1924, was found dead in his home by his maid, Annie Fields. Hoover, who had served for eight Presidents, had died of natural causes.

== May 3, 1972 (Wednesday) ==
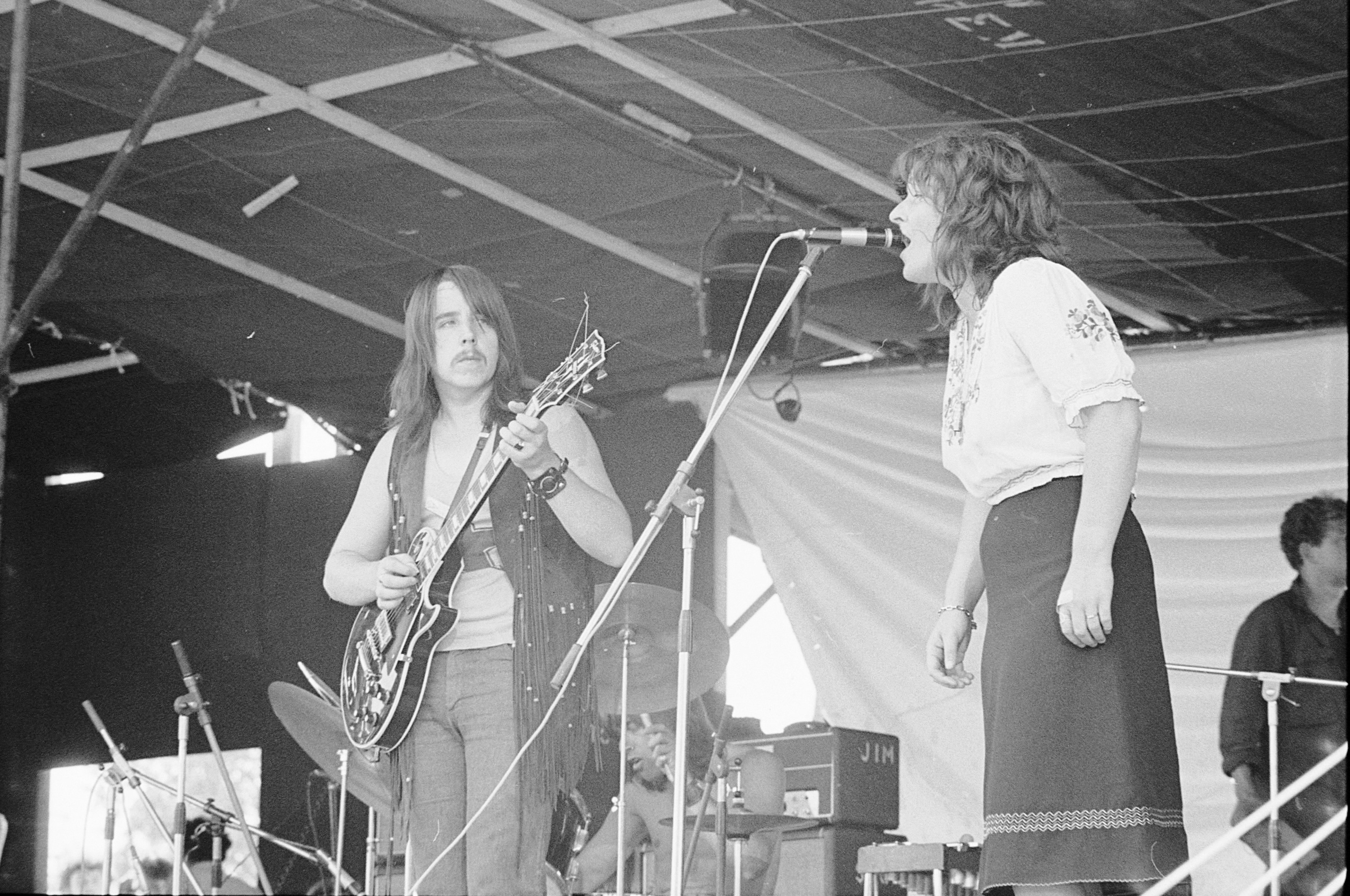
Guitarist Les Harvey (left) at a concert two years before his accidental death

- Les Harvey, the 27-year-old guitarist of the rock band Stone the Crows, was fatally electrocuted before a crowd of 1,200 people, as he was preparing to perform at the Top Rank Ballroom at Swansea University in Wales, UK. Reportedly, Harvey's hands were wet when he took hold of a microphone that was not properly grounded.

== May 4, 1972 (Thursday) ==
- The Paris Peace Talks were suspended indefinitely after the United States and South Vietnam pulled out because of "a lack of progress". When North Vietnam's negotiator Lê Đức Thọ refused to budge on negotiations, even after Henry Kissinger had suggested that the American President was a "madman", President Nixon told Kissinger, "The bastards have never been bombed like they're going to be bombed this time." With talks over, the Operation Linebacker bombing and mining campaign against North Vietnam began.
- Born: Mike Dirnt, bassist and backup singer for Green Day, as Michael Ryan Pritchard in Berkeley, California
- Died: Edward Calvin Kendall, 86, American chemist, 1950 Nobel Prize in Physiology or Medicine

== May 5, 1972 (Friday) ==
- Alitalia Flight 112 from Rome crashed into a mountain as it made its approach to Palermo, killing all 115 people on board. The debris fell near the town of Carini.
- Eastern Airlines Flight 175 was hijacked by Frederick Hahneman shortly after takeoff from Allentown, Pennsylvania. On the same day, Western Airlines Flight 407, with 81 on board, was hijacked by Michael Lynn Hansen after takeoff from Salt Lake City. Hahneman released the 48 Eastern passengers and one stewardess in Washington, D.C. after collecting $303,000 ransom money and six parachutes, flew to New Orleans and back after being unhappy with the small denominations of the bills, then had the plane fly over Honduras, where he parachuted safely. Hansen forced the Western plane to fly to Cuba. Hahneman was captured days later by soldiers, while Hansen was extradited back to the United States in 1975.
- Born:
  - James Cracknell, British rower, winner of six world championships (1997-1999 and 2001–2002) and two Olympic gold medals (in 2000 and 2004); in Sutton, London
  - Devin Townsend, Canadian metal musician, in New Westminster

== May 6, 1972 (Saturday) ==
- Five American soldiers were rescued 13 days after their helicopter crashed in Vietnam. The five had been presumed dead until two of them had reached a radio to signal a distress call.
- Ahmadou Ahidjo, President of the Federal Republic of Cameroon, after placing troops on alert, announced that the 11-year-old federation of former French and British African colonies was going to be replaced by a "united republic" dominated by the French section. In a fraudulent election held on May 20, voters in the British area were said to have approved the anschluss end of self-government by a margin of 716,774 in favor and only 89 against.
- Born: Naoko Takahashi, Japanese women's marathon winner, 2000 Olympics, in Gifu
- Died: Deniz Gezmiş, 25, Turkish radical and co-founder of THKO, the People's Liberation Army of Turkey, was hanged after being convicted of attempting to overthrow the government

== May 7, 1972 (Sunday) ==
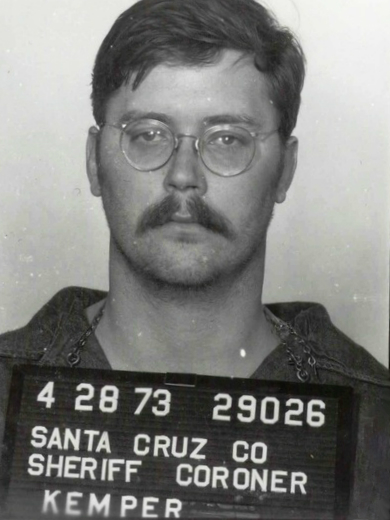
Kemper

- Edmund Kemper, 23, picked up two hitchhiking Fresno State University students, roommates Mary Anne Pesce and Anita Luchessa, drove them to a remote location, murdered them, and then dismembered their bodies. It was the start of a nearly year-long crime spree as a serial killer. Prior to murdering his six randomly picked victims, Kemper had killed his grandparents when he was 15 and spent several years in juvenile detention before being released from a psychiatric hospital. Kemper's last two victims were his mother and her friend, after which he called the Santa Cruz police.
- In the United States, the Los Angeles Lakers basketball team won their first NBA title since moving to L.A. from Minneapolis, beating the New York Knicks 114–106 in Game 5.

== May 8, 1972 (Monday) ==
- In a nationally televised address, President Nixon announced that the United States would lay mines in North Vietnam's harbors in order to stop further supply of weapons and material. The mines would be timed to become active after 72 hours. Nixon added, "To other nations, especially those which are allied with North Vietnam, the actions I have announced tonight are not directed against you. Their sole purpose is to protect the lives of 60,000 Americans, who would be gravely endangered in the event that the Communist offensive continues to roll forward, and to prevent the imposition of a Communist government by brutal aggression upon 17 million people." In Operation Pocket Money, mines were dropped at Haiphong harbor by nine American attack aircraft flying from the carrier USS Coral Sea, and at six other ports, which were blocked for 300 days until the mines were removed by the U.S. in 1973.
- Voting in Italy's parliamentary elections was completed after two days. The coalition of the Christian Democrats and their allies (Socialists, Social Democrats and Republicans), led by Prime Minister Giulio Andreotti, retained power, with 371 seats in the 630 member Chamber of Deputies and a lead in the Senate.
- Born: Darren Hayes, Australian singer for the group Savage Garden; in Brisbane

== May 9, 1972 (Tuesday) ==
- Israeli special forces stormed a hijacked Belgian jet and freed all 97 hostages on board, killing two of the three hijackers. Sabena Flight 571 had been sitting at the Lod Airport in Tel Aviv after being captured the day before by three men, who threatened to blow the jet up unless Israel released imprisoned Arab guerrillas.

== May 10, 1972 (Wednesday) ==
- As the next phase of Operation Linebacker began, American warplanes downed eleven North Vietnamese MiG fighters, as air strikes within North Vietnam continued. three MiG-17s were shot down that day by future Congressman Duke Cunningham, and four MiG-21s by other pilots. An American F-4D was shot down by a North Vietnamese Shenyang J-6, and pilot Maj. Robert Lodge refused to eject. His weapons officer Roger Locher was able to eject and landed, unseen by either friendly or enemy forces, only 64 kilometres (40 mi) from Hanoi, North Vietnam.
- In a referendum, voters in Ireland overwhelmingly approved the Accession Treaty for Ireland to join the European Community. Five out of six (1,041,880 to 211,888) voted yes on a constitutional amendment.
- Born: Katja Seizinger, German alpine skier and Olympic gold medalist in 1994 and 1998; in Datteln, West Germany

== May 11, 1972 (Thursday) ==
- All 74 people on board the British merchant ship Royston Grange were burned to death after it collided with the oil tanker Tien Chee in a fog off of the coast of Uruguay. Flaming oil from the tanker (which lost 9 people) created a ring of fire around the freighter.
- The Boston Bruins won the Stanley Cup after beating the New York Rangers 3–0 in Game 6 of the National Hockey League finals. Wayne Cashman had two goals, Bobby Orr the other one, and goalkeeper Gerry Cheevers made 33 saves for Boston.
- Rogers C. B. Morton, the United States Secretary of the Interior, announced that construction would begin on the controversial trans-Alaska oil pipeline.
- The body of Dr. George Duncan was dragged out of River Torrens in Adelaide, South Australia, where he had been thrown the day before. The law school lecturer and gay activist became a martyr to the gay and lesbian movement across Australia, and his murder led to the decriminalization of homosexuality, starting in South Australia.

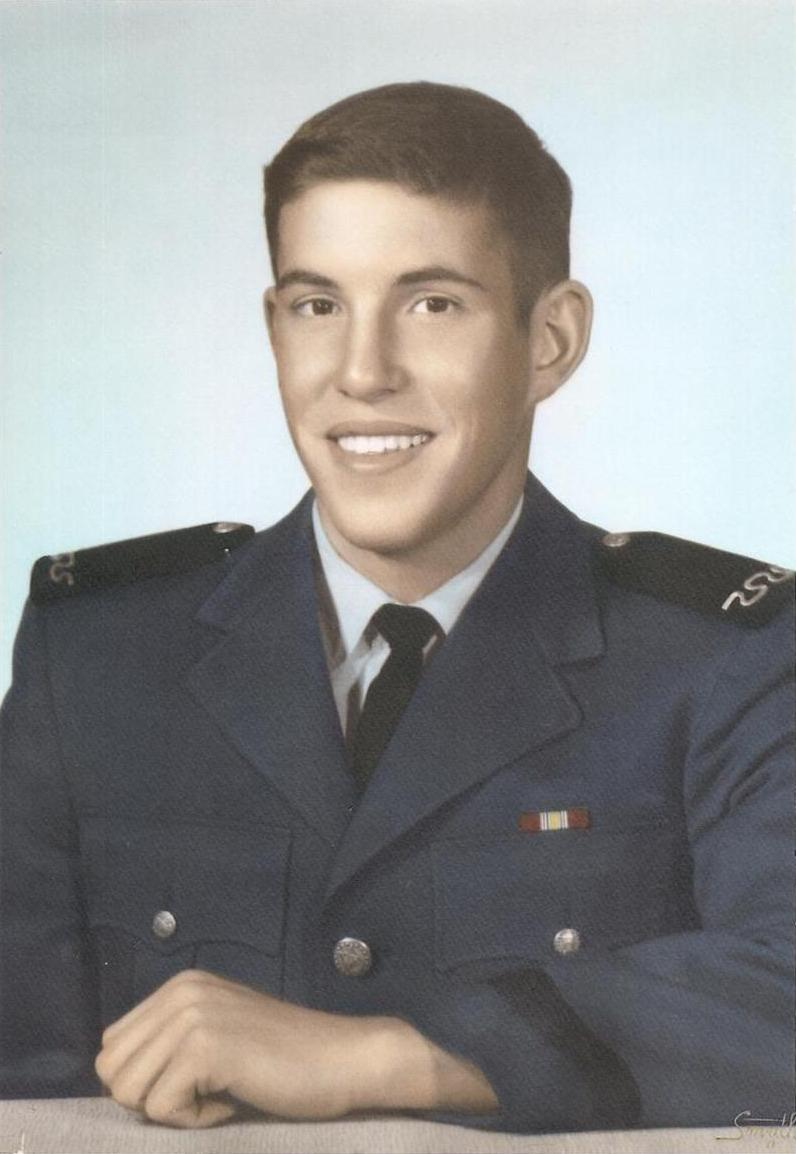
1st Lt. Blassie

- Died: U.S. Air Force 1st Lieutenant Michael Blassie, 23, American military officer whose remains were interred in the Tomb of the Unknown Soldier from 1984 to 1998. Blassie's A-37B Dragonfly was shot down near An Loc in South Vietnam, and his body would be discovered five months later by South Vietnamese troops and classified as unknown by the Mortuary Affairs division. In 1984, twelve years after his death, his remains would be selected as representative of the "Vietnam Unknown Service Member" and interred in a special ceremony at Arlington National Cemetery. After another 14 years, he would be identified by DNA testing, and he is now buried at Jefferson Barracks National Cemetery.

== May 12, 1972 (Friday) ==
- A flash flood killed eight people in the US town of New Braunfels, Texas.
- The Indian Academy of Forensic Medicine (IAFM) was founded and registered under Societies Registration Act 1860 at Panaji, Goa, India.

== May 13, 1972 (Saturday) ==
- Astronomers on Earth observed a type Ia supernova in SN 1972e, in the galaxy NGC 5253, eleven million years after it had happened. Another supernova from NGC 5253 had been observed in 1895.
- Weeks after the Apollo 16 mission had departed, an 1,100-kilogram (2,400 lb) meteorite crashed on the Moon and left a crater "as large as a football field".

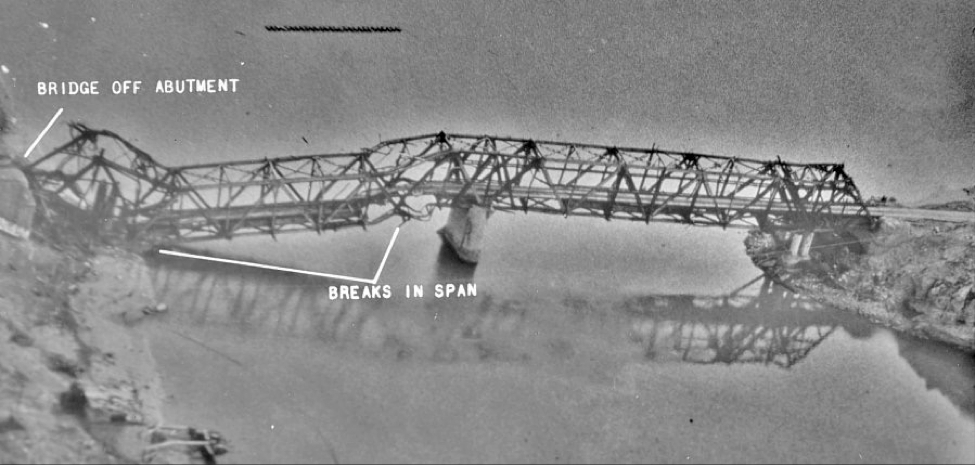
Down after seven years of trying

- The first successful use of the laser-guided bomb was accomplished when the Thanh Hóa Bridge was destroyed in North Vietnam, "accomplishing in a single mission what seven years of nonprecision bombing had failed to do". The United States had first bombed the 540-foot-long (160 m) concrete and steel structure in 1965. Twelve F-4 fighters made runs with fifteen Mark 84 and nine Mark 118 bombs to render the structure useless.
- A fire on the third floor of the Sennichi Department Store building, in Osaka, Japan, killed 117 people partying at the Play Town Cabaret, a nightclub on the building's seventh floor. Although 60 people were able to escape, and the flames never reached the club, ninety-seven died from smoke inhalation, and another twenty were killed when they fell from the roof.
- The nuclear-powered aircraft carrier USS Nimitz, first of the Nimitz class group of the ten largest "supercarriers" in the world, was launched. It would be commissioned on May 3, 1975.

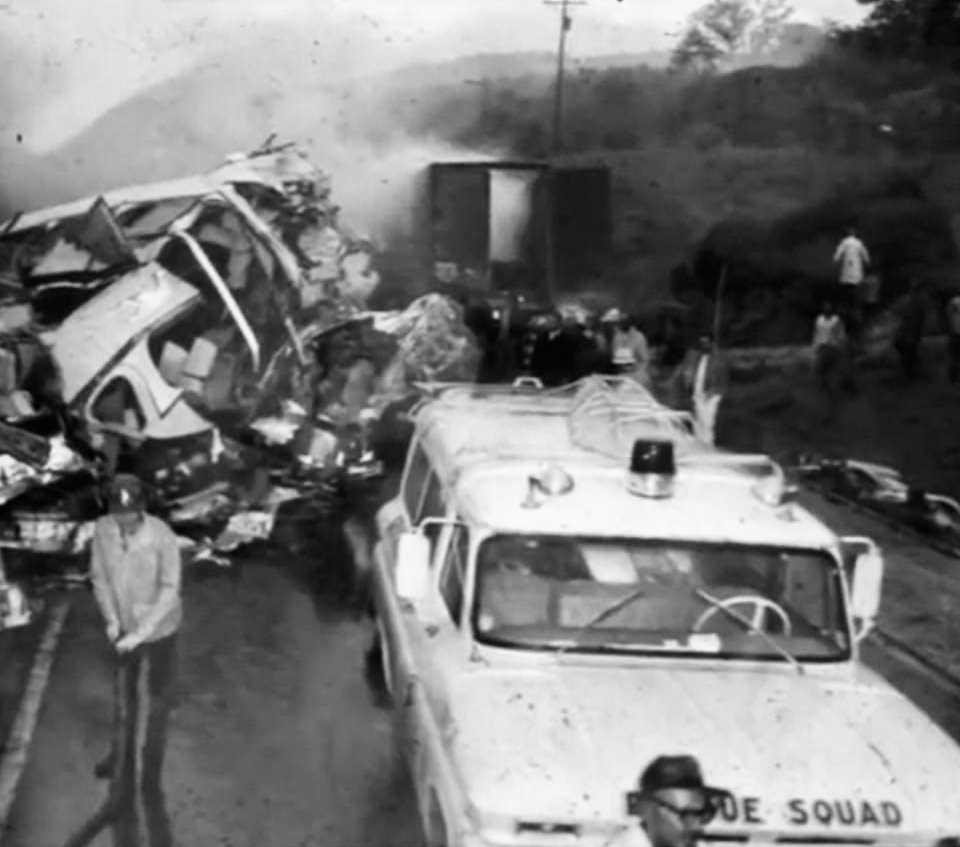
May 13, 1972: Aftermath of the Bean Station bus-truck collision

- At 5:35 a.m., a head-on collision between a double-decker Greyhound bus and a tractor-trailer on U.S. Route 11W in Bean Station, Tennessee, killed 14 people and injured 15, becoming one of the worst vehicular collisions in the state of Tennessee and topping headlines nationwide.
- Died: Dan Blocker, 43, actor known for his role as "Hoss" Cartwright in the TV western Bonanza. Blocker had undergone routine surgery for removal of his gall bladder on May 1 and died of a pulmonary embolism the day after his release from a hospital in Inglewood, California.

== May 14, 1972 (Sunday) ==
- In Kaunas, at that time located in the Soviet Union's Lithuanian Soviet Socialist Republic, 19-year-old Romas Kalanta set himself on fire to become a martyr for Lithuania's independence. When police prohibited a public funeral, thousands of students and workers took to the streets on May 18 to take up Kalanta's cause. The nationalist uprising was suppressed by May, with the arrest of over 500 people, only eight of whom were ever tried. The Republic of Lithuania, which had been annexed to the U.S.S.R. in 1940, would attain independence again in 1990.

== May 15, 1972 (Monday) ==
- After 26 years of rule by the United States, the island of Okinawa and the other islands of the Ryukyu Islands were returned to the jurisdiction of Japan. Vice-president Spiro T. Agnew appeared on behalf of the U.S. in ceremonies marking the transfer. A colony of Japan, Okinawa had been captured by the United States in the last major battle of World War II at the cost of thousands of lives on both sides, and the Okinawans, considered their own ethnic group in Japan, numbered nearly one million residents. The Okinawa Reversion Treaty had been approved by the U.S. Senate, 84–6, the preceding year. U.S. bases remained, but as Okinawa became a prefecture of Japan for the first time, yen replaced dollars as currency, and in 1977, traffic laws changed to conform to driving on the left side of the road rather than the right.
- Alabama Governor George C. Wallace was shot five times while campaigning for the Democratic nomination for president. The would-be assassin, Arthur Bremer, wounded three others in addition to Wallace at a rally in at the Laurel Shopping Center in Laurel, Maryland. Wallace survived, but was permanently paralyzed from the waist down. At the time of the shooting, Wallace had won more votes (3,354,360) in the primaries than either George McGovern (2,202,840) or Hubert Humphrey (2,647,676), but was second to McGovern in delegates won (323 vs. McGovern's 409)

== May 16, 1972 (Tuesday) ==
- The first financial derivatives exchange, the International Monetary Market (IMM), opened on the Chicago Mercantile Exchange. With greater fluctuation of currency exchange rates, the IMM opened a new era in trading by allowing purchase of futures on three currencies. The first trades were for the British pound, the Deutschmark, and the Japanese yen.
- The National Sickle Cell Anemia Control Act was signed into United States law by President Nixon.

== May 17, 1972 (Wednesday) ==
- The Ohio College Library Center OCLC in the United States amended its articles to allow its five-year-old computer network to link with libraries outside the state, linking over 500 sites by 1975 and over 2,000 by the end of 1979. OCLC now stands for Online Computer Library Center and connects 60,000 libraries.
- Tottenham Hotspur and Wolverhampton Wanderers played to a 1–1 draw in the second of two matches in the first ever UEFA Cup Championship. Tottenham had won the first match 2 to 1, giving it a 3 to 2 aggregate over Wolverhampton.
- An avalanche in Colombia killed 12 people at Boyaca when tons of rock buried six vehicles on a highway, following heavy rains.
- Died:
  - Luigi Calabresi, 34, Italian investigator for the Polizia di Stato, was assassinated in Milan by the terrorist group Lotta Continua. The motive for the killing was described by the Lotta Continua group as retaliation for the death of anarchist Giuseppe Pinelli on December 15, 1969, when Pinelli was in Calabresi's Calabresi was walking to his office when a gunman approached him from behind and shot hin in the back and in the neck.
  - Jaime José, Eduardo Aquino, and Basilio Pineda Jr., three of the men convicted of participating in the 1967 gang rape of Philippine film actress Maggie de la Riva, were executed by electric chair. Though not shown on television, live coverage of the executions was broadcast nationally on the radio by order of President Marcos.

== May 18, 1972 (Thursday) ==
- The Sea-Bed Treaty (officially, the "Treaty on the prohibition of the Emplacement of Nuclear Weapons of Mass Destruction on the Sea-Bed and the Ocean Floor and in the Subsoil Thereof"), signed on February 11, 1971, took effect.
- Following a march four days earlier by more than 100,000 protesters, Philibert Tsiranana, the first President of Madagascar, agreed to step down, and handed over all power to General Gabriel Ramanantsoa.
- An Antonov An-10 turboprop airplane with 108 people aboard crashed while attempting an emergency landing at Kharkov. A one-paragraph announcement of the accident was printed in the Soviet newspaper Pravda two days later, noting that "The passengers and crew were killed. A government commission has been appointed for inquiry into the causes of the disaster."
- Died: Robert Lee Johnson, 50, a former U.S. Army sergeant who was seven years into a 25-year prison sentence for treason and espionage, was stabbed to death in a visitor's area at the federal prison in Lewisburg, Pennsylvania. His murderer was his own son, who would tell authorities that his motive for patricide was simply "a personal matter".

== May 19, 1972 (Friday) ==
- A bomb exploded at the Pentagon, destroying an unoccupied women's restroom where it had been placed. Though nobody was injured, a computer tape archive with highly classified information was severely damaged. The Weather Underground claimed responsibility for the bombing.
- The National Eagle Scout Association was created by Boy Scouts of America.
- Northeast Airlines was acquired by Delta Air Lines, along with its direct flights from New York and Boston to Florida destinations.
- Tunisia, along with UNESCO, began an international campaign to preserve the ruins of ancient Carthage.

== May 20, 1972 (Saturday) ==
- The Indiana Pacers beat the New York Nets, 108–105, to win the ABA championship in Game 6 of the series. The Pacers and Nets would be among four teams to join the NBA in 1976.
- Professional golfer Jane Blalock was disqualified from the Bluegrass Invitational for not marking her ball properly, and then failing to take a two-stroke penalty. Within a month, the LPGA Tour would move to suspend Blalock. In response, she would file an anti-trust lawsuit against the LPGA. The Jane Blalock cheating controversy would continue until 1975, when both parties agreed to settle their claims against one another.

== May 21, 1972 (Sunday) ==
- The Communist Party of the Soviet Union announced the removal from power of Petro Shelest, who had led the Ukrainian Soviet Socialist Republic since 1963 as First Secretary of its Communist Party. Shelest was accused of mestnichestvo (localism) and placing the Ukraine's interests ahead of those of the Union, was transferred to a job as a Deputy Chairman of the USSR Council of Ministers, and after his removal, many of his associates were purged from office.
- Michelangelo's 475-year-old masterpiece, the sculpture Pietà, was heavily damaged by Laszlo Toth, using a hammer. After more than seven months of work, experts replaced broken pieces of the marble statue and restored it "in such a way as to make the damage invisible."
- Born: The Notorious B.I.G., American rapper also known as Biggie Smalls; as Christopher Wallace in Brooklyn (murdered 1997)
- Died: Jamsrangiin Sambuu, 76, President of Mongolia since 1954

== May 22, 1972 (Monday) ==
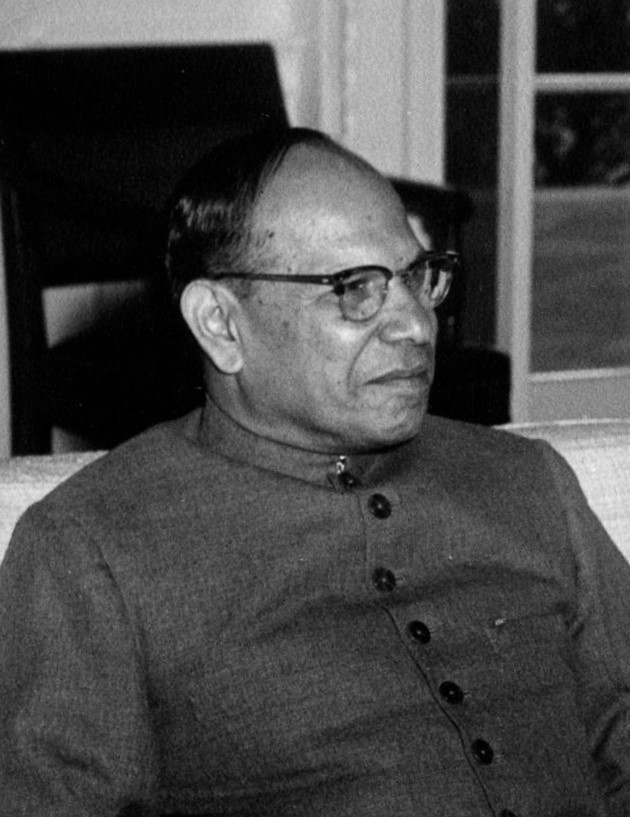
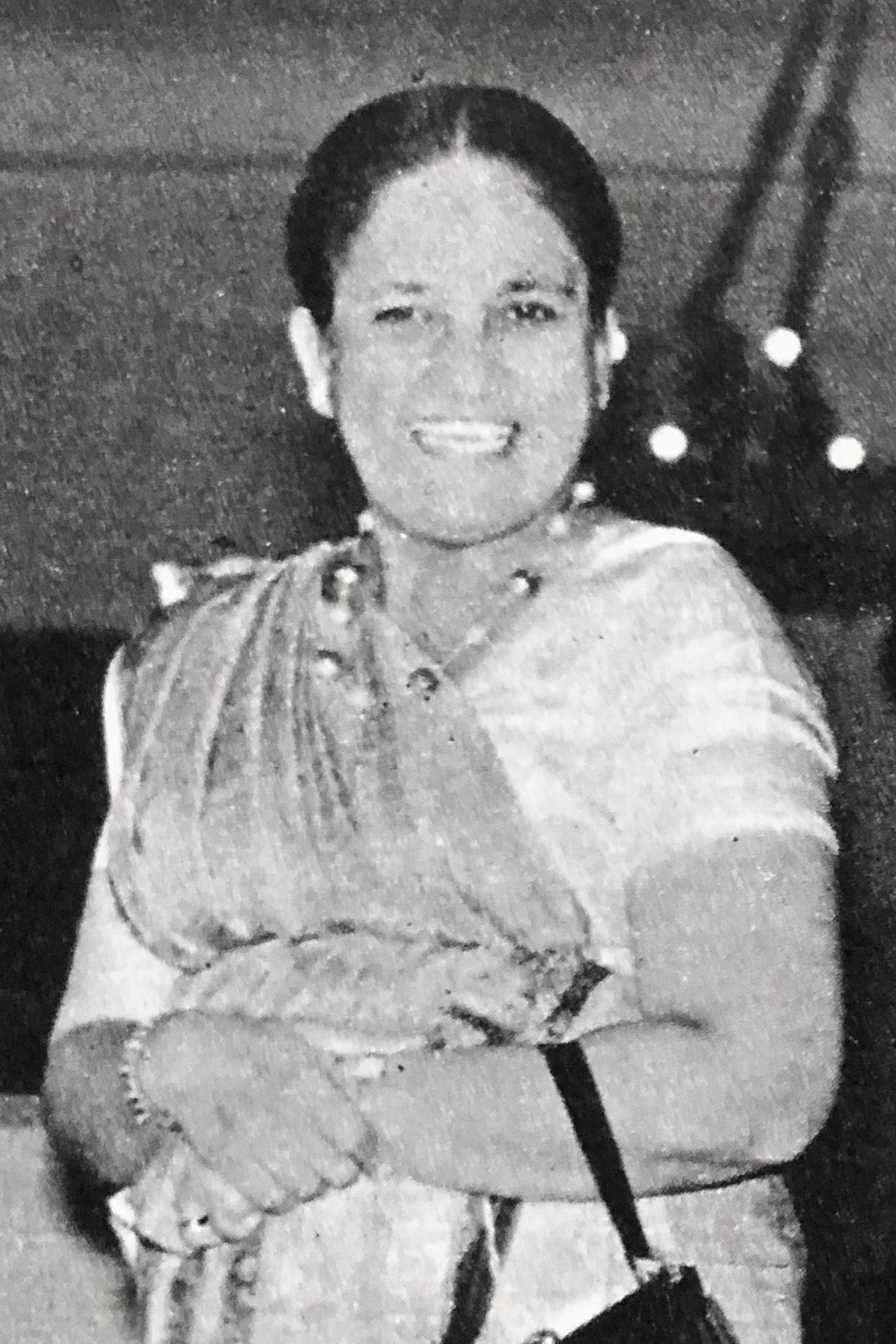
Sri Lanka President Goppalawa and Prime Minister Bandanaraike
- The Republic of Sri Lanka was formally created, adopting a new name, a new constitution, and a new form of government. Formerly the Dominion of Ceylon, it had been nominally ruled by the Queen of England since gaining independence in 1948. William Gopallawa, who had been Governor-General of Ceylon since 1962, became the first President of Sri Lanka, while Sirimavo Bandaranaike continued as Prime Minister
- Richard M. Nixon became the first United States President to visit Moscow (and only the second President, after Franklin D. Roosevelt, to visit the Soviet Union), as he and Henry Kissinger arrived to begin a summit meeting with Soviet First Secretary Brezhnev.
- Died:
  - Cecil Day-Lewis, 68, Poet Laureate of Britain since 1968;
  - Margaret Rutherford, 80, English actress

== May 23, 1972 (Tuesday) ==
- In Moscow, Presidents Richard Nixon and Nikolai Podgorny signed, on behalf of the United States and the Soviet Union respectively, the "Agreement on Cooperation in the Field of Environmental Protection".
- The fictional character Rerun van Pelt (Linus and Lucy's little brother), was born, in the comic strip Peanuts.
- Born: Rubens Barrichello, Brazilian race car driver, in São Paulo

== May 24, 1972 (Wednesday) ==
- West Germany formally relinquished all claims to eastern territories lost by Germany to the USSR and to Poland following World War II, as the West German President Gustav Heinemann signed the Moscow Treaty and Warsaw Treaty. The treaties had been approved the week before by the Bundestag and the Bundesrat. Included were the formerly German city of Königsberg, which became Russian Kaliningrad, and the former Breslau, which became Wrocław in Poland.
- The Apollo–Soyuz Test Project was created by an agreement signed by President Richard Nixon for the United States and Premier Alexei Kosygin for the Soviet Union.
- Rangers of Glasgow won the Cup Winners' Cup, with a 3–2 win over Dynamo Moscow in the final at Barcelona. Rangers' fans repeatedly came from the stands and onto the field, with more than a minute left to play and Dynamo down by only one goal. For the behavior of its fans, the team was barred from European competition for the following season, including from the 1973 Cup.
- Born: Maia Sandu, Moldovan politician, President of Moldova, in Risipeni, Moldavian SSR
- Died:
  - Asta Nielsen, 90, Danish silent film actress
  - Ismail Yassine, 59, Egyptian film actor
  - Stanley Ray Bond, 27, American bank robber, killed while assembling a bomb at his cell in Walpole State Prison

== May 25, 1972 (Thursday) ==
- The first computerized fly-by-wire airplane flight was made by test pilot Gary Krier, in an F-8 Crusader that had been equipped with the digital computer that had been used on Apollo space missions.
- Ciao! Manhattan, a New York underground film starring Edie Sedgwick, was completed after five years of stop and start production.
- Born:
  - Karan Johar, Bollywood director, in Mumbai, India
  - Jules Jordan, American porn movie director, in Hershey, Pennsylvania

== May 26, 1972 (Friday) ==
- Two historic nuclear arms control agreements were signed at Moscow, between the United States (by its president, Richard M. Nixon) and the Soviet Union (by Communist Party First Secretary Leonid Brezhnev). The SALT I treaty, product of the Strategic Arms Limitation Talks, prohibited both sides from building additional offensive nuclear missiles, while the ABM Treaty restricted both sides to only two sites for Anti-Ballistic Missiles, with 100 missiles each.
- Later known as the "Watergate burglars", a team associated with the Committee to Re-Elect the President, failed in its first attempt at wiretapping the Democratic National Committee headquarters at the Watergate complex.
- In Taiwan, Chiang Ching-kuo was made the Prime Minister of Nationalist China by the Legislative Yuan, by a vote of 381–13. Chiang's father was Chiang Kai-shek, President of Nationalist China.
- Willandra National Park was established in Australia.

== May 27, 1972 (Saturday) ==
- The Occupational Safety and Health Administration (OSHA), announced its plans as an American government agency to form advisory commissions for the purpose of regulating 13 different occupational hazards, including toxic chemicals, excessive noise, and radiation.
- The Kings Island amusement park opened near Mason, Ohio, after having had several preview events starting on April 29.

== May 28, 1972 (Sunday) ==
- The Watergate burglars succeeded in their second attempt to break into the Democratic National Committee offices at the Watergate complex in Washington, D.C., placing wiretaps on two telephones, and escaping undetected. When it became clear that the "bug" on DNC Chairman Larry O'Brien was not working, the men broke in again three weeks later and were caught. The botched June 17, 1972, burglary was the beginning of the Watergate scandal that eventually led to Nixon's resignation as President of the United States.
- The first major accident, resulting from the design of the Ford Pinto automobile, happened near Barstow, California. Mrs. Lilly Gray and her teenage son, Richard Grimshaw, were severely burned after the gas tank in their 1972 Pinto exploded after the car stalled and was rear-ended on Interstate Highway 15. Mrs. Gray died of her injuries, and her son was scarred for life. A jury awarded $125 million in punitive damages, against Ford Motor, to the family, which was reduced to $3.5 million, and more than $3 million in compensatory damages. The verdict was upheld on appeal in 1981 in the landmark case of Gray v. Ford Motor Company, 119 Cal. App.3d 757.
- Died:
  - The former King Edward VIII of the United Kingdom, later the Duke of Windsor, died at the age of 77 in his home in France, more than 35 years after he gave up his throne in order to marry Wallis Warfield Simpson. King Edward, whose reign lasted from January 20 to December 11, 1936, left no children.
  - Kent Evans, 17, was killed while climbing Mount Shuksan as part of a University of Washington class. Evans was one of four high school students at Lakeside School who were working on computer projects. The other three, his best friend of Bill Gates, and Paul Allen and Ric Weiland, would go on to become billionaires as co-founders of Microsoft.

== May 29, 1972 (Monday) ==
- President Nixon and Soviet leader Brezhnev concluded their summit conference, with the signing of a joint declaration of long-range plans to avoid a military confrontation and to eventually disarm.
- Born: Laverne Cox, American actress and LGBT advocate, in Mobile, Alabama
- Died Moe Berg, 70, professional baseball player who also served as a spy for the Office of Strategic Services during World War II.

== May 30, 1972 (Tuesday) ==
- The Lod Airport massacre took place in Tel Aviv after passengers from Air France Flight 132 went to claim their baggage on arrival from Rome. Three of the passengers were members of the Japanese Red Army terrorist group operating on behalf of the Popular Front for the Liberation of Palestine – External Operations; without warning, they brought out submachine guns and hand grenades from their luggage and fired into the crowd, killing 26 people and injuring another 78. One terrorist was shot by another, while a second was killed by his own grenade. The third, Kōzō Okamoto, was jailed, but eventually released in a prisoner exchange in 1985.
- Five children were killed, and 22 injured, in the derailing of a roller coaster, the "Big Dipper", at Battersea Park in London.
- Born: Manny Ramírez, Dominican baseball player, in Santo Domingo

== May 31, 1972 (Wednesday) ==
- The 145th and final mission of the CORONA spy satellite program came to an end when its exposed film was recovered. Since 1959, the Corona satellites were launched with Kodak film, then returned to Earth after taking photos over the Soviet Union and its neighbors. Transmission of images from spy satellites made the Corona program obsolete.
- Three Italian Carabinieri (Antonio Ferrero, Donato Poveromo and Franco Dongiovanni) were killed in a car bomb explosion in the city of Peteano. Vincenzo Vinciguerra, an activist in the neo-fascist organizations Avanguardia Nazionale ("National Vanguard") and Ordine Nuovo ("New Order"), would later be convicted of the murder and sentenced to life in prison.
- Born: Frode Estil, Norwegian cross-country skier, gold medalist in 2001–03, 2005, in Lierne Municipality
- Died: Dr. Walter Freeman, 76, American neurosurgeon who popularized the lobotomy
