= June 1972 =

Month of 1972

<<	June 1972					>>
Su	Mo	Tu	We	Th	Fr	Sa
				1	2	3
4	5	6	7	8	9	10
11	12	13	14	15	16	17
18	19	20	21	22	23	24
25	26	27	28	29	30

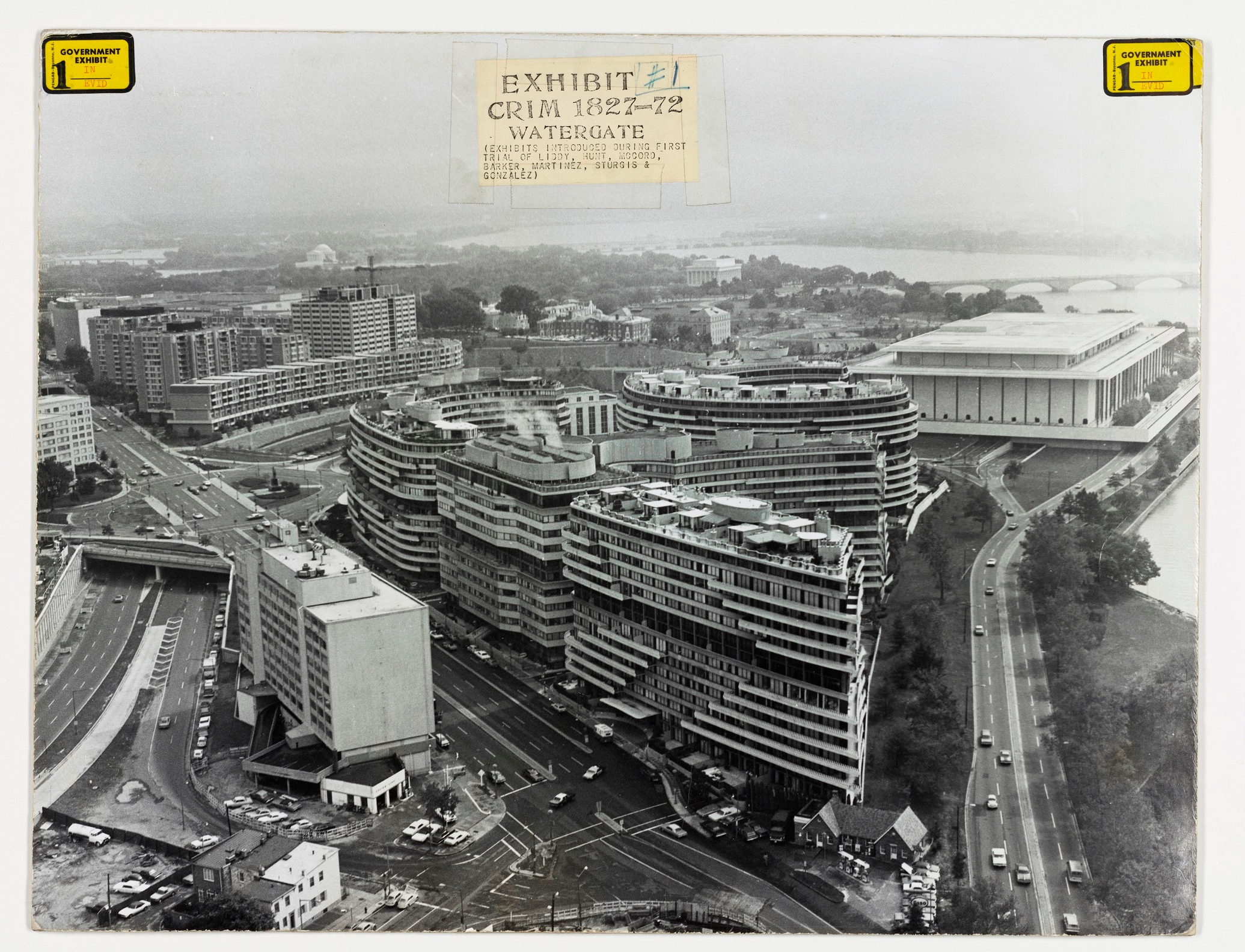
June 17, 1972: Five would-be wiretappers arrested at Watergate Office Complex

The following events occurred in June 1972:

== June 1, 1972 (Thursday) ==
- Andreas Baader, co-founder of the "Baader-Meinhof Gang" (the Red Army Faction), was arrested after West German police traced him to a warehouse in Munich. Captured also were Holger Meins and Jan-Carl Raspe. The other half of a couple compared to Bonnie and Clyde, Ulrike Meinhof, was still on the run.
- The Convention for the Conservation of Antarctic Seals was signed in London by twelve nations.
- The Iraq Petroleum Company was completely nationalized by the government of Iraq, through its Public Law 69, making the company part of the state-owned Iraq National Oil Company.
- Pablo Picasso completed his final painting, The Embrace, at his home in Mougins, France. He died ten months later at the age of 91.
- Alice Cooper released their breakout album School's Out.

== June 2, 1972 (Friday) ==
- The Passamaquoddy and Penobscot Indian tribes filed Joint Tribal Council of the Passamaquoddy Tribe v. Morton, a suit against the State of Maine in the U.S. District Court in Portland. Attorney Tom Tureen sued for enforcement of a treaty that provided the tribe ownership of 2/3 of Maine. Judgment would be made in favor of the Indian tribes in 1980.
- The Four Power Agreement on Berlin was signed by the foreign ministers of the Allied Powers in World War II, as Alec Douglas-Home (Britain), Maurice Schumann (France), Andrei Gromyko (USSR) and William P. Rogers (US) met in West Berlin.
- The United Republic of Cameroon was proclaimed by Federal Republic of Cameroon President Ahmadou Ahidjo, following a referendum where voters supported a resolution to end separate cabinets for the east and west portions of the African nation. East Cameroon Premier Simon Pierre Tchoungui and West Cameroon Premier Salomon Tandeng Muna assumed jobs in President Ahidjo's new cabinet and the office of Prime Minister was abolished.
- Major Roger Locher, whose F-4D had been shot down on May 10, was finally rescued after 23 days behind enemy lines. He was 60 miles (97 km) northwest of Hanoi and within 5 miles (8.0 km) of the heavily defended Yên Bái Air Base. 7th Air Force General John Vogt canceled the entire strike mission set for Hanoi that day and dedicated all available resources to rescuing Lochar. The direct task force of 119 aircraft successfully pulled him out of the jungle without any losses. His time behind enemy lines and successful rescue was a record for the Vietnam War. It was the farthest penetration of an American search and rescue operation into North Vietnam.
- Born: Wayne Brady, American comedian and game show host; in Orlando, Florida

== June 3, 1972 (Saturday) ==
- Sally Priesand became the first American woman (and the second known woman anywhere) to be ordained as a rabbi, as one of 26 Hebrew Union College graduates ordained at the Isaac M. Wise Temple in Cincinnati.
- Born: Ashk Dahlén, Swedish scholar and translator, in Tafresh

== June 4, 1972 (Sunday) ==
- African-American activist Angela Davis was acquitted by an all-white jury in San Jose, California, after a 14-week trial. Davis, formerly a 28-year-old instructor at UCLA, had been charged with conspiracy for murder and kidnapping in a 1970 murder of a judge in Marin County. Jurors, who deliberated over the weekend, said later that they had doubted her guilt throughout the trial.
- Soviet author Joseph Brodsky was summoned to the Leningrad office of the Ministry of the Interior, where he was told that he was being expelled from U.S.S.R. immediately. He was then put on an Aeroflot flight to Vienna. Brodsky settled in the United States, where he later became the American poet Laureate, and won the Nobel Prize in Literature in 1987.
- The first presidential election held in the Khmer Republic (Cambodia) resulted in a victory for the incumbent, Lon Nol, although counting within the capital of Phnom Penh showed a majority for challenger In Tam. Lon Nol ordered the military to collect and count the poll results from the countryside, where In Tam had had greater support, and was soon declared the winner.
- Died: Robert Harrill, 79, the "Fort Fisher Hermit"

== June 5, 1972 (Monday) ==
- The United Nations Conference on the Human Environment, also called the Stockholm Conference, convened in Sweden, with representatives from 113 nations in attendance for the largest international meeting ever held on ecological issues. The twelve-day conference led to the creation of UNEP, the United Nations Environment Programme. June 5 is now observed annually by the U.N. as World Environment Day.
- G. Gordon Liddy spoke with James W. McCord Jr. about problems with getting anything useful from wiretaps planted more than a week before on the phone of DNC Chairman Larry O'Brien. Liddy recounted later that if the problem were not fixed, McCord's team would get no further money from the Committee to Re-Elect the President, "because the job should have been done correctly the first time". The Watergate burglars were caught after breaking into O'Brien's office again on June 17, 1972.

== June 6, 1972 (Tuesday) ==
- An explosion killed 426 coal miners at the Wankie No. 2 Colliery in Hwange, Rhodesia (Zimbabwe). In addition to 176 Rhodesians (140 black and 36 white), the dead hailed from various nations—Zambia (91), Mozambique (52), Malawi (37), Tanzania (30), Britain (14), South Africa (12), Namibia (9), the Caprivi Strip (4) and Botswana (1).
- U.S. Senator George McGovern of South Dakota won the Democratic primary in California, along with 274 delegates, putting him far in the lead for his party's nomination for president.
- Voters in Montana approved a new constitution.
- U.S. Patent No. 3,668,658 was granted to the IBM Corporation for the first "floppy disk" (officially, "diskettes" for the IBM 3330 computer).
- Died: Abraham Adrian Albert, 66, American mathematician

== June 7, 1972 (Wednesday) ==
- The U.S. Department of Labor issued the first regulations in America to limit exposure to asbestos. At the time, there were 200,000 workers in the asbestos industry.
- Ananda Mohan Chakrabarty became the first person to apply for a patent for a genetically engineered living organism, a strain of Pseudomonas bacteria that could consume crude oil. The U.S. Supreme Court would uphold the right to patent a living organism in 1980 in Diamond v. Chakrabarty.
- The 1950s nostalgia musical Grease began the first of 3,388 performances on Broadway, running until April 13, 1980.
- A measurable amount of rain (more than 0.01 inches (0.25 mm)) fell in Phoenix, Arizona for the first time since the start of the year, after a drought in the American city that had gone on for 160 consecutive days, a record for any major U.S. city. The capital of Arizona, which had more than one million people in its metropolitan area and 600,000 within city limits, had last seen precipitation on December 29, 1971, before the 1972 thunderstorm brought a downpour that spilled over downtown street curbs within minutes.
- Born: Karl Urban, New Zealand actor, in Wellington
- Died: E. M. Forster, 91, British novelist (A Passage to India)

== June 8, 1972 (Thursday) ==
- A South Vietnamese village outside of Trang Bang was bombed with napalm in an errant air strike by the South Vietnamese Army, shortly after 11:30 a.m. Nick Ut took a photograph that became an iconic symbol of the horrors of war. The wirephoto, published on the front pages of newspapers that evening and the next morning, showed children crying in pain from their burns, including a 9-year-old girl, Phan Thị Kim Phúc, who had torn her clothes off after catching fire. The image would win a Pulitzer Prize.

== June 9, 1972 (Friday) ==
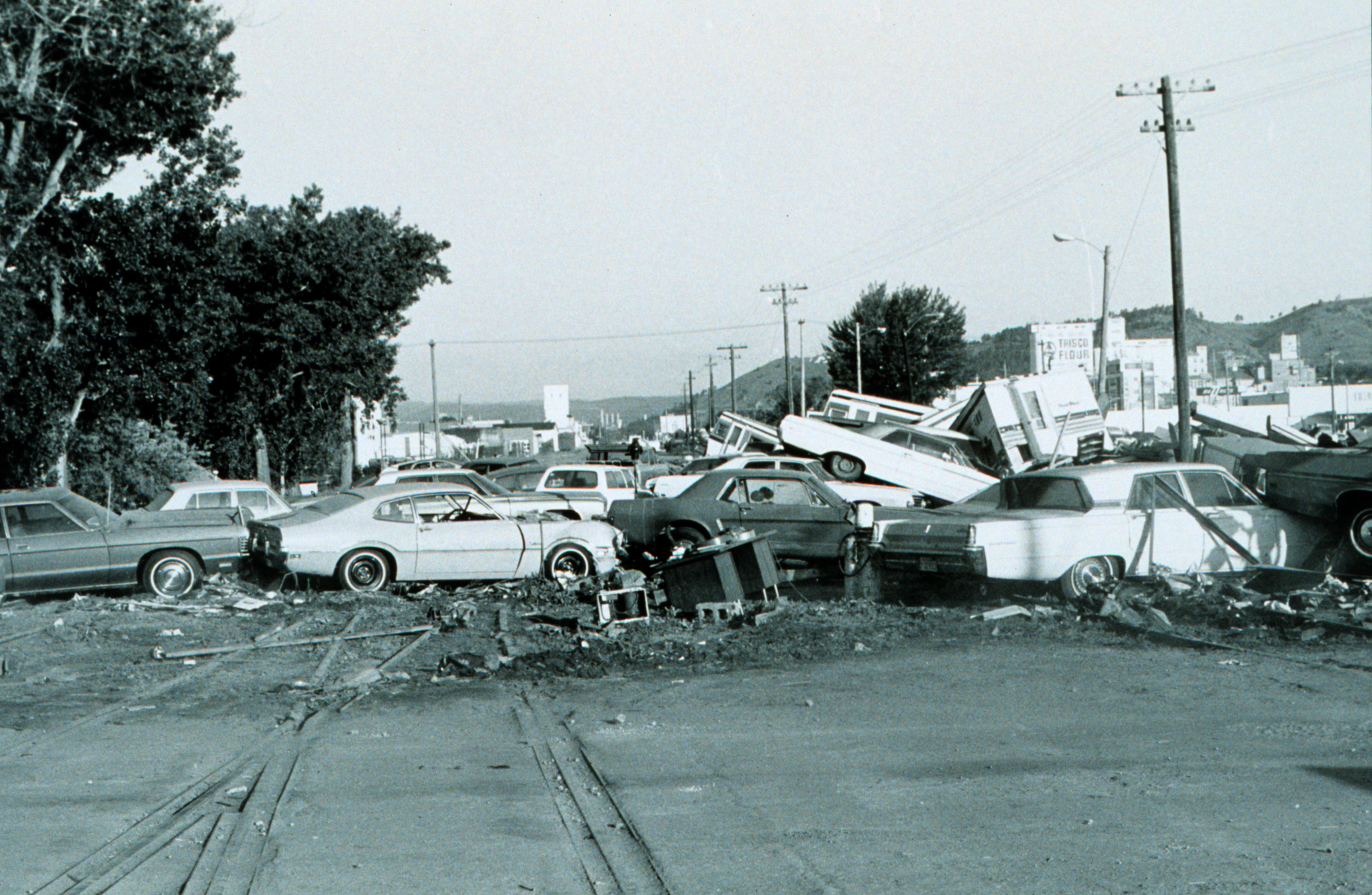

- At 10:45 p.m., the Canyon Lake Dam at Rapid City, South Dakota, gave way under the pressure of a downpour, sending millions of gallons of water through the city. The results of the Black Hills flood were 238 people killed, and 3,057 more injured. More than 5,000 vehicles and 700 homes were destroyed, and the total damages were $165 million.
- Bruce Springsteen received his big break as he was signed to a ten-record deal by CBS Records.
- Born: Wes Scantlin, American rock musician (Puddle of Mudd), in Kansas City, Missouri
- Died: Lt. Col. John Paul Vann, 47; later the subject of book and film A Bright Shining Lie; in a helicopter crash

== June 10, 1972 (Saturday) ==
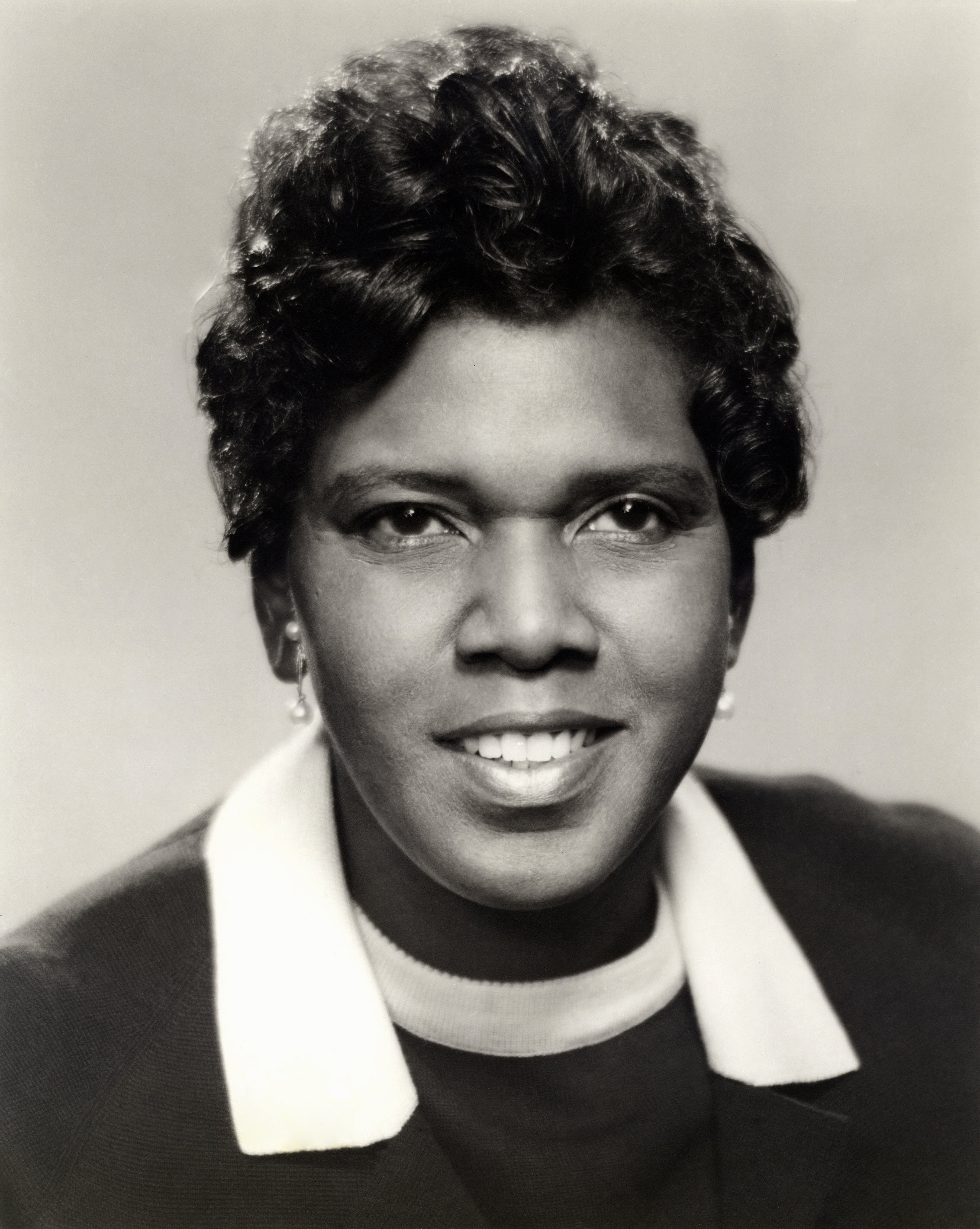
Acting Governor Jordan

- Barbara Jordan, President Pro Tempore of the Texas State Senate, was sworn in as Acting Governor of Texas for one day as Governor Preston Smith and Lieutenant Governor Ben Barnes were absent, becoming the first African-American woman in history to serve as a state Governor.

== June 11, 1972 (Sunday) ==
- Deep Throat, perhaps the most famous pornographic film of all time, made its debut, at the World Theatre in Manhattan. Made for $25,000, the film returned more than $600,000,000 worldwide.

== June 12, 1972 (Monday) ==
- The city of North Charleston, South Carolina, made up of predominantly African-American areas that had been kept outside of the city limits of predominantly white Charleston, was formally incorporated, 14 months after a referendum had resulted in a majority of voters approving a separate city. North Charleston, with a roughly 58% black and Hispanic population, contrasts with 70% white Charleston.

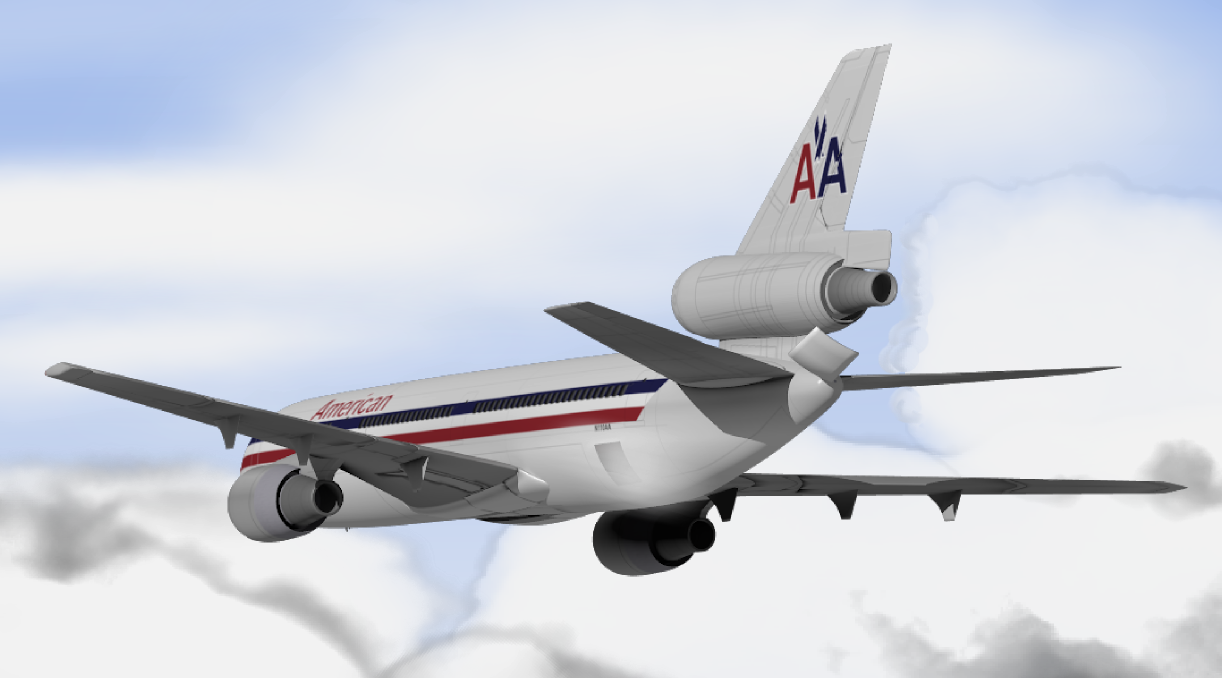
Artist's Rendition of the moment after the cargo door ripped apart from Flight 96

- American Airlines Flight 96 made an emergency landing after an improperly closed cargo door was blown off at 12,500 feet (3,800 m), shortly after the DC-10 took off from Detroit for a flight to Buffalo. Captain Bryce McCormick struggled with failing flight controls to land the jet, and the 67 people on board, at Cleveland. In a similar accident in 1974 on Turkish Airlines Flight 981, all 346 people on board were killed after the cargo door fell off.

== June 13, 1972 (Tuesday) ==
- Captain Nikolay Grigoryevich Petrov, a GRU secret agent stationed at the Soviet Embassy in Indonesia, defected by surrendering to the American naval attache in Jakarta. Petrov, who had stolen the equivalent of $900 from his supervisor and then panicked, was given the call sign "Houdini" and relocated to the United States, where he supplied detailed information about GRU activities to the CIA. Against the advice of the agency, he returned to the U.S.S.R. in the late 1970s, and was never heard from again.
- Died:
  - Georg von Békésy, 73, Hungarian biophysicist, 1961 Nobel laureate
  - Stephanie von Hohenlohe, 80, German World War II spy

== June 14, 1972 (Wednesday) ==
- DDT (dichlorodiphenyltrichloroethane), a widely used and well-known pesticide, was banned in the United States by order of Environmental Protection Agency Director William D. Ruckelshaus, with all use to cease by the end of 1972.
- Japan Airlines Flight 471 crashed while attempting to land at New Delhi on a flight from Bangkok, killing 82 of the 87 people on board, and 4 on the ground.

== June 15, 1972 (Thursday) ==
- Dougal Robertson, his wife, three children, and a family friend, were sailing on their yacht Lucette, when the boat was attacked and sunk by orca whales. The six survived 38 days adrift in the Pacific Ocean, then on an inflatable liferaft, then on a dinghy. Robertson wrote about the experience in a book, Survive the Savage Sea, later made into a 1991 film.
- Ulrike Meinhof, the other half of the Baader-Meinhof Gang, was arrested in a teacher's apartment in Langenhagen, West Germany, along with her partner in crime, Gerhard Müller.
- Cathay Pacific Flight 700Z crashed shortly after takeoff from Bangkok bound to Hong Kong, killing all 81 people on board. The crash was traced to the explosion, 22 minutes after the Convair CV-880 had taken off, of a bomb. A former police lieutenant in Thailand, who had purchased $270,000 of flight insurance on his girlfriend and daughter before the departure, would be indicted for premeditated murder, but the charges would later be dismissed.
- Born:
  - Andy Pettitte, American MLB pitcher; in Baton Rouge, Louisiana
  - Poppy Montgomery, Australian actress known for Without A Trace; in Sydney

== June 16, 1972 (Friday) ==
- The United States Federal Communications Commission issued its "Open Skies" decision, clearing the way for private companies to operate their own ground systems for use of orbiting communications satellites, so long as they obtained FCC approval, and complied with FCC rules, which included offering their transmissions to a wide range of customers. The decision opened the door for the first cable networks to offer their own programming to paying customers.
- The Stockholm Declaration was adopted unanimously by the 112 nations participating in the first international conference on the environment. The United Nations General Assembly later approved the declaration by its Resolution 2994, by a vote of 112–0 with ten abstentions.
- A rockfall, inside a mile-long railway tunnel near Soissons, France, led to the collision and derailment of two passenger trains, killing 107 people. At 8:50 p.m., six carloads of passengers were traveling from Paris to Laon, and after entering the tunnel, ran into a pile of rock and concrete. Minutes later, as survivors lay in the wreckage, a second train came into the tunnel, from the opposite direction, with its own three carloads of passengers, colliding with the rubble and the first train. There were 90 people who survived their injuries.

== June 17, 1972 (Saturday) ==
- At around 2:30 in the morning, five men—James W. McCord Jr., Bernard Barker, Eugenio Martínez, Frank Sturgis and Virgilio González—were arrested at Democratic National Committee headquarters on the sixth floor of the Watergate Office Building in Washington, D.C., by city police. Sergeant Paul Leeper, and plainclothes officers John Barret and Carl Shollfer, had arrived after being called by security guard Frank Wills. The attempt by President Nixon to prevent the FBI from investigating the break-in would unravel his presidency.
- Nine firefighters were killed in a fire at the Hotel Vendome in Boston.
- Born: Iztok Čop, Slovenian rower, in Kranj, Yugoslavia

== June 18, 1972 (Sunday) ==
- In the worst air disaster in Britain up to that time, all 118 people aboard British European Airways Flight 548 were killed when the Trident jetliner crashed at 5:29 p.m., shortly after takeoff from Heathrow.
- The first Libertarian Party convention closed in Denver, with the 100 delegates nominating Professor John Hospers as president, and Theodora Nathalia Nathan as his running mate. The Hospers-Nathan third party ticket would receive one electoral vote, from Nixon elector Roger MacBride of Virginia.
- West Germany Won UEFA Euro 1972 against The Soviet Union in the final.

== June 19, 1972 (Monday) ==
- Bringing an end to an era of secret wiretapping by the U.S. Justice Department, the Supreme Court of the United States ruled, 8–0, in United States v. U.S. District Court (407 U.S. 297), that the American government did not have the authority to spy, without a warrant, upon private citizens within the United States. On the same day, the Supreme Court upheld professional baseball's antitrust law exemption, in Flood v. Kuhn.
- Airline pilots launched a worldwide 24-hour strike to protest hijacking, but only three U.S. carriers were grounded and one of those resumed flights at midmorning.
- Born:
  - Brian McBride, U.S. soccer player, in Arlington Heights, Illinois

== June 20, 1972 (Tuesday) ==
- From 11:30 a.m. to 1:00 pm, on their first day back at the White House after the Watergate break-in, President Nixon and Chief of Staff Haldeman met at the Oval Office. When the tape recording of their conversation was subpoenaed later by a special prosecutor, it was found that 18½ minutes of the tape had been erased.
- The Tallahatchie Bridge mentioned in Bobbie Gentry's "Ode to Billie Joe" collapsed after having burned. The fire was attributed to vandalism.
- Died: Howard Deering Johnson, 75, founder of Howard Johnson's hotel chain

== June 21, 1972 (Wednesday) ==
- The world record for highest altitude in a helicopter (40,814 ft or 12,440 m) was set by Jean Boulet in an Aerospatiale SA-315 Lama. Boulet said that "that flight also wound up being the longest autoration in history because the turbine died as soon as I reduced power."
- Born: Irene van Dyk, South African netball star, and (with 72 appearances for the South African team and 145 for New Zealand) the most capped player of all time; in Vereeniging

== June 22, 1972 (Thursday) ==
- MCI (Microwave Communications, Inc.), which would successfully fight the monopoly held by AT&T on American telephone service, went public, offering 40 percent (3.3 million) of its shares for sale at ten dollars per share. The offering sold out immediately, and MCI's valuation was over $120,000,000.
- The 1,000,000th Ford Thunderbird was produced, rolling off of an assembly line in Los Angeles. The car was first produced in 1955.
- Born: Emanuele Filiberto of Savoy, Prince of Venice, grandson of King Umberto II, pretender to the throne of the Kingdom of Italy since of as the son of Vittorio Emanuele, Prince of Naples; in Geneva, Switzerland.
- Died: Vladimir Durković, 34, a former footballer for the Yugoslavia national team, and an active player for the FC Sion team in Switzerland's league, was shot and killed by a policeman in Sion.

== June 23, 1972 (Friday) ==
Nixon Oval Office meeting with H.R. Haldeman "Smoking Gun" Conversation June 23, 1972 Full Transcript

- U.S. President Richard Nixon and his chief of staff, H. R. Haldeman, had three conversations, where the President directed that the FBI should be told to stop further investigation of the Watergate burglary. All Oval Office conversations were recorded by a voice-activated system, and when the transcript of the "smoking gun" tape was released on August 5, 1974, Nixon would resign at the end of the week.
- The Omnibus Education Bill, providing, for the first time, direct federal aid to private and public colleges and universities, was signed into law by President Nixon. Title IX of the law said in part, "No person in the United States shall, on the basis of sex, be excluded from participation in, be denied the benefits of, or be subjected to discrimination under any education program or activity receiving federal financial assistance". Those words fueled the growth of women's college sports, as the schools had to provide athletic programs for women as well as for men. As federal school funding expanded, so did opportunities for girls at the primary and secondary school level.
- The United Kingdom Chancellor of the Exchequer, Anthony Barber, announced a decision for the pound sterling to move to a floating exchange rate. Although intended to be temporary, the change would remain permanent. The London Stock Exchange suspended trading that day and on the following Monday, and would not reopen until June 27. Foreign exchange controls were applied to most members of the sterling area.
- Hurricane Agnes had been downgraded to a tropical storm after reaching Florida on June 19, but combined with existing storm systems in the northeast U.S. to produce record-breaking rainfalls and floods. Ultimately, 118 people died, and 370,000 were left homeless. Five states—New York, Pennsylvania, Maryland, Virginia and Florida—were declared disaster areas.
- Born: Zinedine Zidane, French footballer with 108 caps for the France National Team; in Marseille

== June 24, 1972 (Saturday) ==
- Helen Reddy's song "I Am Woman" entered the Billboard Top 100 at No. 99, but dropped back out after three weeks. In September, it re-entered at No. 87, then made a gradual climb, hitting No. 1 on December 9.
- Skyjacker Martin Joseph McNally hijacked American Airlines Flight 119 as it flew from St. Louis to Tulsa. At St. Louis, he received a suitcase with $502,200 ransom money and parachutes, but the jetliner was rammed by a car that crashed through an airport fence and raced down the runway. Moving to another plane, he then made plans to bail out with the suitcase, but needed instructions on how to parachute safely. The $502,200 suitcase was swept out of McNally's hands by the airstream left by the jet. Having lost his money, McNally safely reached the ground, and was arrested near Detroit on June 28.

== June 25, 1972 (Sunday) ==
- The "Bugojno group", a 19-member team of Croatian Revolutionary Brotherhood separatists, fought a battle with the Yugoslavian Army near the town of Uskoplje in SR Bosnia-Herzegovina, killing Captain Miloš Popović and one of the soldiers, but losing their own commander, Adolf Andrić. The next day, a larger Yugoslavian force fought with the surviving Bugojno guerrillas near Rumboci. Eleven soldiers were killed and 14 wounded, while nine guerrillas died and five executed after being captured. The other four were captured in July. Three would be tried and executed on March 17, 1973. The lone survivor, Ludvig Pavlović, was sentenced to 20 years in prison.
- Guerrillas in the Armed Commanders of Guerrero began ambushes of the Mexican Army, killing ten soldiers and wounding two others.
- Died: Jan Matulka, 81, American painter

== June 26, 1972 (Monday) ==
- Ecuador started a new era as an exporter of petroleum, as the first oil began flowing from the fields of Sucumbíos Province, through the 312-mile Trans-Ecuadorean Pipe Line, to the port of Balao.
- Boxer Roberto Durán defeated WBA lightweight champion Ken Buchanan in a fight at New York's Madison Square Garden, beginning a 17-year reign in boxing at the levels of lightweight (1972–79), welterweight (1980), junior middleweight (1983) and middleweight (1989).
- The McDonnell Douglas F-15 Eagle jet fighter was introduced, at the McDonnell Douglas factory in St. Louis.
- A 19-year-old woman in Pennsylvania became the last American to be sentenced to death prior to the U.S. Supreme Court's ruling that the death penalty was unconstitutional. A week earlier, Marilyn Dobrolenski of Toledo, Ohio, had pleaded guilty of the January 5th murder of two Delaware State Police troopers, Ronald Carey and David C. Yarrington, without seeking a plea bargain of any sort. Four days later, the U.S. Supreme Court would issue its decision in Furman v. Georgia, and on June 29, 1973, she would be sentenced to two consecutive life terms.

== June 27, 1972 (Tuesday) ==

- Nolan Bushnell and Ted Dabney incorporated Atari, Inc. in California, to mass-produce video game machines. Their first choice of name, "Syzygy", was already in use by a candlemaker in Mendocino, so the entrepreneurs used a term from Japanese gaming.
- William Reagan Johnson became the first openly gay minister of a major American denomination, as the United Church of Christ ordained him.
- The new World Hockey Association scored a coup with the signing of Bobby Hull to a contract that made him, at the time, the highest-paid athlete in North America. Hull, longtime star of the National Hockey League and the Chicago Blackhawks, jumped to the new Winnipeg Jets.

== June 28, 1972 (Wednesday) ==
- The Simla Summit took place at Simla, capital of India's Himachal Pradesh, as two enemy nations worked to resolve future disagreements without war. India's Prime Minister Indira Gandhi hosted Pakistan's President Zulfikar Ali Bhutto for five days.

== June 29, 1972 (Thursday) ==
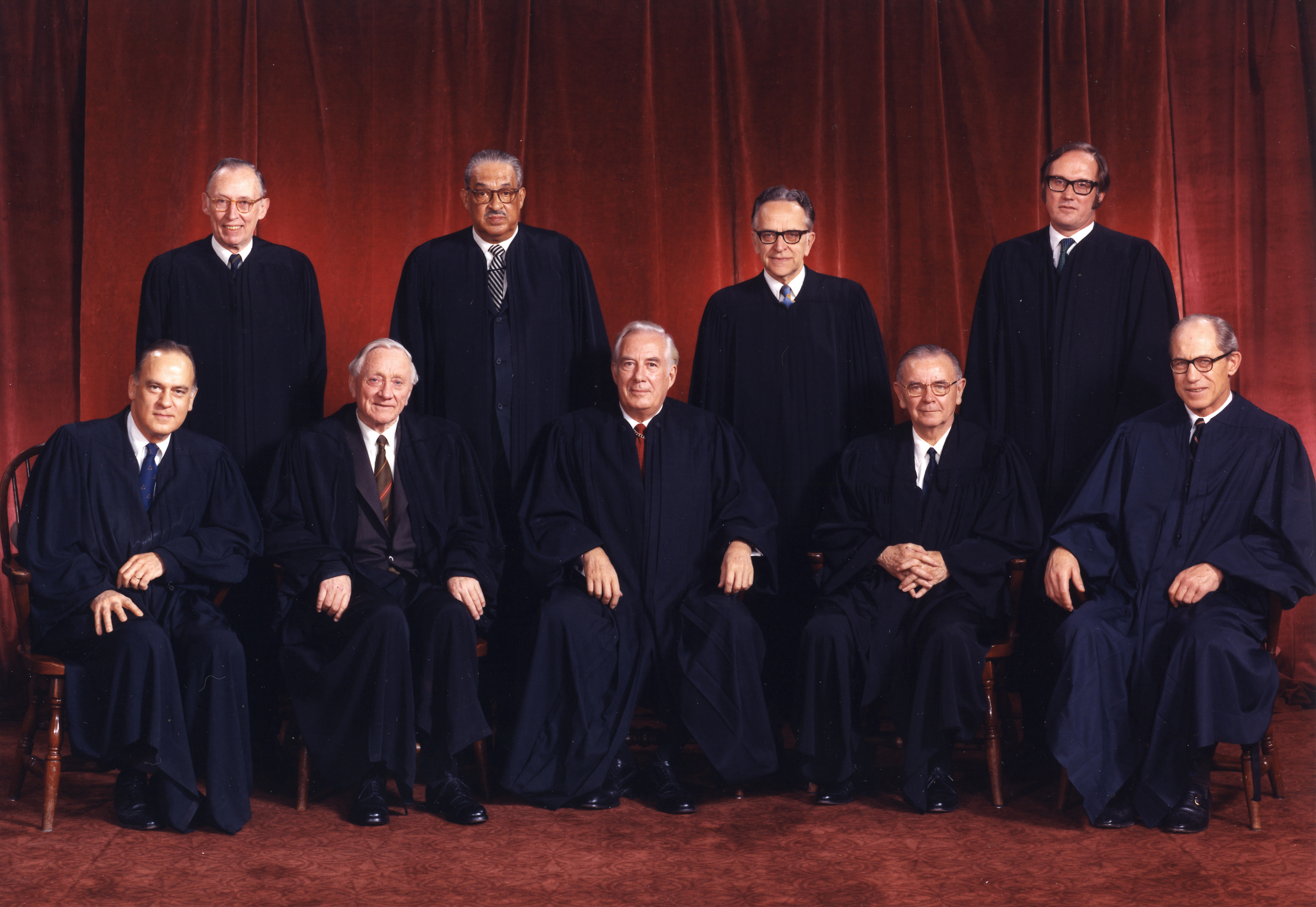
The 1972 court

- The landmark case of Furman v. Georgia, on the unconstitutionality of all existing American state laws permitting the execution of prisoners, was decided by the Supreme Court of the United States. Chief Justice Warren E. Burger, along with Justices William Rehnquist, Harry Blackmun and Lewis F. Powell Jr., voted to sustain the death penalty, and Justices William J. Brennan Jr., Thurgood Marshall, William O. Douglas and Potter Stewart voted to declare the laws unconstitutional. The 4–4 tie was broken by the last of the justices to weigh in, Byron White, who surprised observers by agreeing that the laws violated guarantees against cruel and unusual punishment. All 629 American prisoners on death row were spared by the ruling, including William Henry Furman, who would be paroled in 1984. No person had been executed in America since June 2, 1967, when Luis Monge died in the gas chamber in Colorado. In Utah, Gary Gilmore became the first American prisoner to be executed (January 17, 1977) after individual states passed new laws to comply with the Furman guidelines.
- Born:
  - DJ Shadow, American DJ and record producer, as Joshua Paul Davis in San Jose, California
  - Samantha Smith, American child peace activist, in Houlton, Maine (killed in plane crash, 1985)
  - Nawal Al Zoghbi, Lebanese singer, in Byblos

== June 30, 1972 (Friday) ==
- For the first time, a leap second was observed. The National Bureau of Standards in Boulder, Colorado, stopped the clock at 23:59:59 GMT (4:59 pm local time), adding 23:59:60 before moving over to 0h 0m 0s.

 1972-06-30 23.59.57
 1972-06-30 23.59.58
 1972-06-30 23.59.59
 1972-06-30 23.59.60 <-- leap second
 1972-07-01 00.00.00
 1972-07-01 00.00.01
 1972-07-01 00.00.02

- Forward Pass won the 1968 Kentucky Derby, more than four years after the horse race had been run, when Kentucky's highest court denied a petition for a rehearing of its April 28 decision. Dancer's Image had finished first on May 4, 1968, but was then disqualified, for the drug Butazolidin, by Churchill Downs. The decision upheld by the state racing commission, reversed by a circuit court in 1970, then restored by the Court of Appeals. The Derby purse of $122,600 was then released to the owners of the horse that crossed the line second, Forward Pass.
- Born: Garret Anderson, American baseball player, in Los Angeles (d. 2026)
