= Richard McCoy Jr. =

American aircraft hijacker (1942–1974)

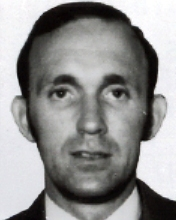
- 1972 mugshot of McCoy
- Born: Richard Floyd McCoy Jr. December 7, 1942; Kinston, North Carolina, U.S.
- Died: November 9, 1974 (aged 31); Virginia Beach, Virginia, U.S.
- Spouse: Karen Burns McCoy (m. 1965)
- Children: 2
- Parent(s): Myrtle McCoy; Richard Floyd McCoy, Sr.
- Criminal charge: Aircraft piracy

Richard Floyd McCoy Jr. (December 7, 1942 – November 9, 1974) was an American aircraft hijacker. McCoy hijacked a United Airlines passenger jet for ransom in April 1972. Due to a similar modus operandi, McCoy has been proposed as the person responsible for the November 1971 hijacking of Northwest Orient Airlines Flight 305, attributed to the still-unidentified "D. B. Cooper".

== Early life ==
McCoy was born December 7, 1942, in the town of Kinston, North Carolina, to Richard Floyd McCoy Sr. (1916–2008) and Myrtle Helen McCoy (1922–2020), who were first cousins. He grew up in nearby Cove City. In 1962 McCoy moved to Provo, Utah, and enrolled at Brigham Young University (BYU) before dropping out to serve a two-year tour of duty in the Army. He served in Vietnam as a demolition expert and pilot and was awarded the Purple Heart in 1964.

In 1965, McCoy returned to BYU, where he met Karen Louise Burns. They married in August 1965 in Raleigh. By 1971 they had two children, Chanté and Richard.

McCoy served another term in the Army on the condition he could go to Vietnam, where he was awarded both the Army Commendation Medal and Distinguished Flying Cross. Upon returning to Utah, he served as a warrant officer in the Utah National Guard and was an avid skydiver.

McCoy taught Sunday school and had studied law enforcement at BYU. His purported dream was to become an FBI agent.

== Criminal career ==
Animation showing the same modus operandi as D. B. Cooper (click to view animation)

On April 7, 1972, McCoy, using the alias "James Johnson", boarded United Airlines Flight 855, a Boeing 727-22C (Registration: N7426U) en route from Newark, New Jersey, to Los Angeles. McCoy boarded the plane, which carried 85 passengers and a crew of six, including pilot Captain Jerry Hearn, during a stopover in Denver. The aircraft was equipped with aft stairs (as was the aircraft used in the D. B. Cooper incident), via which McCoy escaped in mid-flight by parachute after giving the crew similar instructions as Cooper had. McCoy had obtained a $500,000 cash ransom, and carried a hand-grenade and a pistol.

Police began investigating McCoy following a tip from a motorist. The driver had picked up McCoy hitch-hiking at a fast-food restaurant, where McCoy was wearing a jumpsuit and carrying a duffel bag. McCoy had also described to an acquaintance how easy it would be to carry out such a hijacking.

Following fingerprint and handwriting matches, McCoy was arrested two days after the hijacking. McCoy was on National Guard duty flying one of the helicopters involved in the search for the hijacker. Inside his house, FBI agents found a jumpsuit and a duffel bag filled with cash totaling $499,970.

McCoy claimed innocence, but was convicted of the hijacking and received a 45-year sentence. Once incarcerated at the Federal penitentiary at Lewisburg, Pennsylvania, McCoy used his access to the prison's dental office to fashion a fake handgun out of dental paste. He and a crew of convicts (Joseph Havel, Larry L. Bagley, and Melvin Dale Walker) escaped on August 10, 1974, by commandeering a garbage truck and crashing it through the prison's main gate. Havel and Bagley were captured three days later following a shootout after a bank robbery.

Three months later, the FBI located McCoy in Virginia Beach, Virginia. News reports stated that on November 9, 1974, McCoy walked into his home and was met by FBI agents Nick O'Hara, Kevin McPartland, and Gerald Houlihan; he fired at them, and all agents opened fire, killing McCoy. Melvin Dale Walker tried to flee in their getaway car but he was apprehended after a short car chase by FBI Agents Richard Rafferty and Henry Bolin Jr.

== Lawsuits over Cooper allegations ==
1991 saw the publication of D. B. Cooper: The Real McCoy, by Chief Probation Officer Bernie A. Rhodes Jr. and FBI agent Russell P. Calame. Both authors investigated McCoy's skyjacking case, and their book posits that Cooper and McCoy were the same person.

After the book's publication, Karen McCoy, McCoy's widow, filed suit against the authors, the publisher, and her former attorney, Thomas S. Taylor. She stated that they misrepresented her involvement in the hijacking for which McCoy was convicted, and also misrepresented later events from interviews done with Taylor in the 1970s. She sought an injunction against publication and distribution of the book.

During court proceedings, it was revealed that Karen was deeply involved in the hijacking. Her request for an injunction to prohibit further sales of the book was denied. However, an injunction to prohibit the sale of movie rights to the book – conditional upon the movie including references to four specific allegations in the book that she protested – was granted.

Karen accepted settlements in 1994. The book's publisher, the University of Utah Press, paid Karen McCoy $20,000. Taylor was ordered to pay her $100,000. The two authors' settlements are confidential.

== Continued FBI interest ==
In 2006, a radio station in Utah did a series of interviews with FBI agents involved in the McCoy and Cooper cases, many of which were the last public interviews of the FBI agents before they died.

Documents released in 2020 via the Freedom of Information Act revealed that as late as 2004 the FBI had still not completely cleared McCoy as a Cooper suspect and were attempting to obtain a DNA sample from McCoy's family discreetly. In a 2024 YouTube video by Dan Gryder, McCoy's children said they believed he had been D. B. Cooper and found a parachute in their mother's storage shed, which Gryder claimed matched the exact specifications of the parachute used by Cooper. Gryder reported that the parachute had been taken by the FBI for investigation, though the FBI have not confirmed this. In early 2026, it was reported that the FBI had returned the parachute to Gryder.

== Military awards ==
- Distinguished Flying Cross
- Air Medal
- Army Commendation Medal
- Purple Heart
- National Defense Service Medal
- Vietnam Service Medal
- Republic of Vietnam Campaign Medal

== Bibliography ==
- Rhodes, Bernie & Russell P. Calame (1991). D.B. Cooper: The Real McCoy. Salt Lake City: University of Utah Press. ISBN 0-87480-377-2. OCLC 24173928.
