= May 1927 =

Month of 1927

<<	May 1927					>>
Su	Mo	Tu	We	Th	Fr	Sa
1	2	3	4	5	6	7
8	9	10	11	12	13	14
15	16	17	18	19	20	21
22	23	24	25	26	27	28
29	30	31

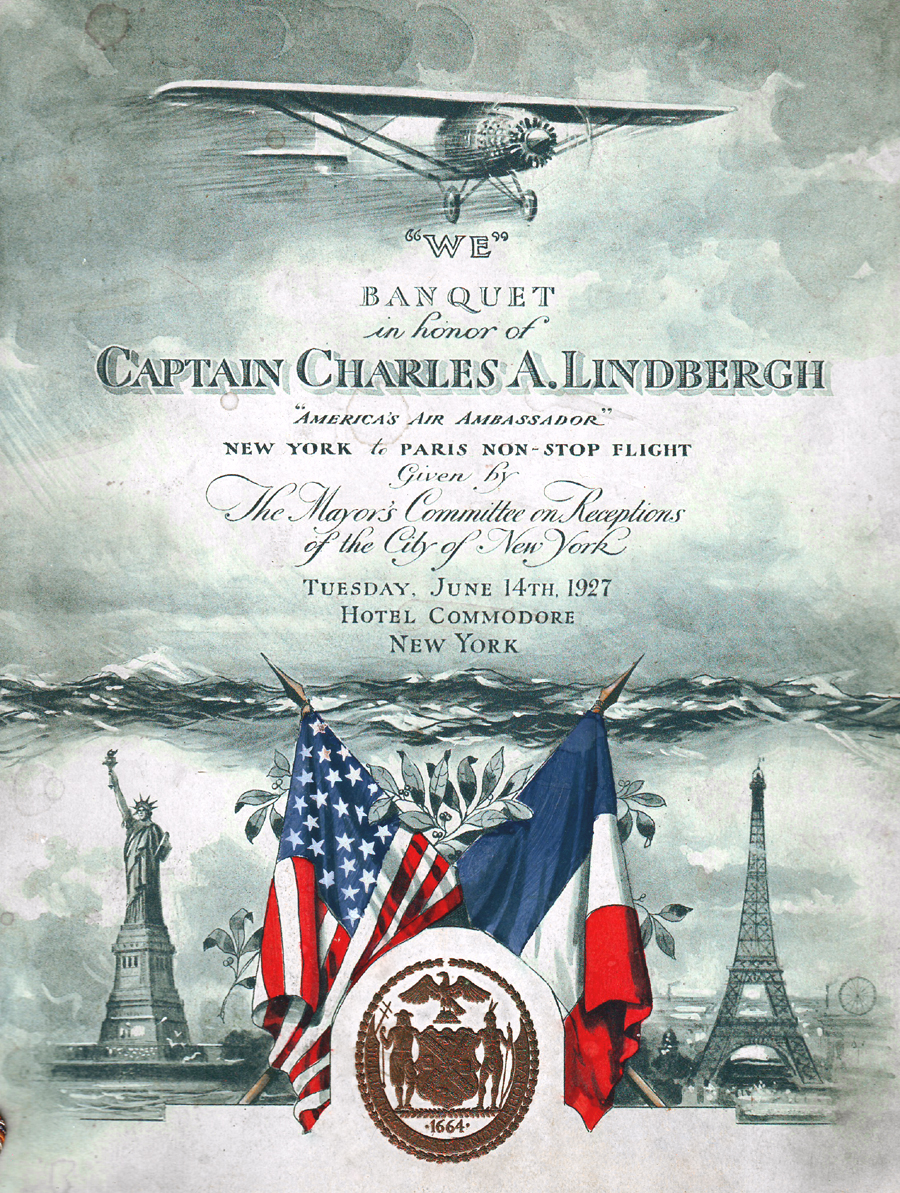
May 21, 1927: Charles Lindbergh becomes first man to fly non-stop from New York to Paris

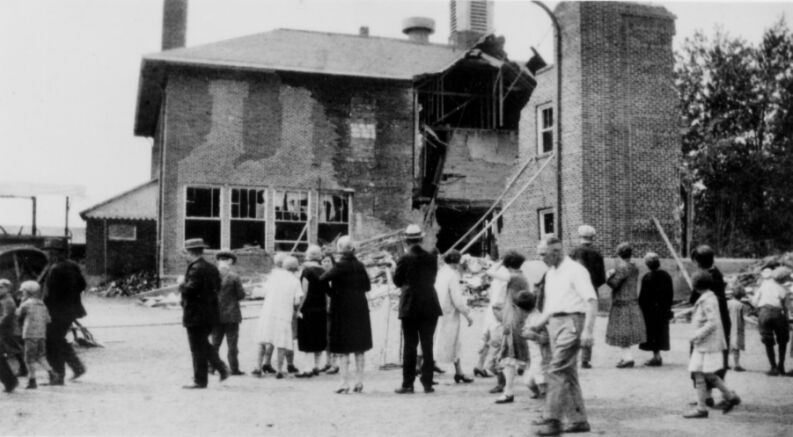
May 18, 1927: Murderer kills 38 schoolchildren, six adults in Michigan school bombing

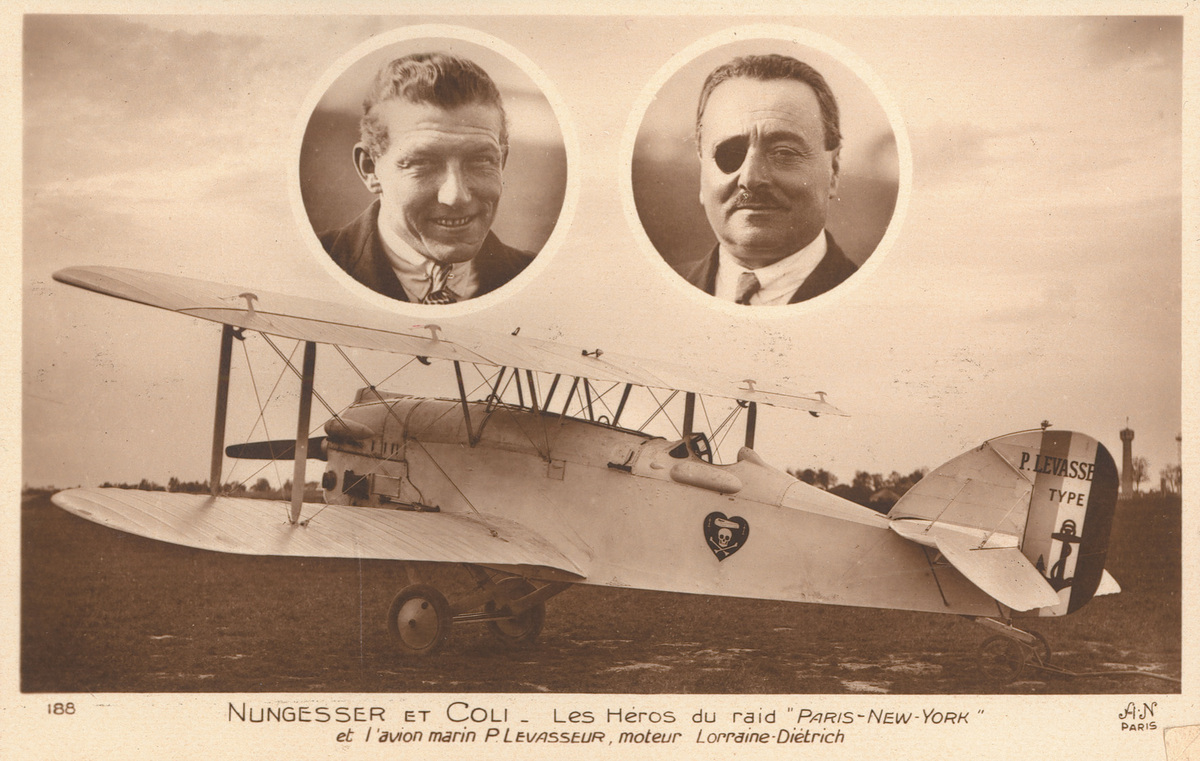
May 9, 1927: Nungusser and Coli disappear while attempting trans-Atlantic flight

The following events occurred in May 1927:

== May 1, 1927 (Sunday) ==
- The Experimental Mechanised Force, the first military unit created for research and development of tanks and other weapons of armoured warfare, was created as part of the British Army.
- Born: Albert Zafy, President of Madagascar 1993 to 1996, in Ambilobe (d. 2017)

== May 2, 1927 (Monday) ==
- In the case of Buck v. Bell, Oliver Wendell Holmes Jr., delivered the 8-1 majority opinion by the U.S. Supreme Court, upholding a Virginia law permitting compulsory sterilization of intellectually disabled women, writing, "It is better for all the world, if instead of waiting to execute degenerate offspring for crime, or to let them starve for their own imbecility, society can prevent those who are manifestly unfit from continuing their kind." Pierce Butler was the lone dissenter.
- The U.S. Department of Agriculture began the grading of beef sold at retail, on a one-year trial, with "choice" and "prime" grades being applied to those producers who requested the service.
- Died: Ernest Starling, 61, British physiologist

== May 3, 1927 (Tuesday) ==
- Dr. Quirino Majorana, Italian physicist, announced in Rome that he had invented a system for "wireless transmission of speech by means of ultra-violet rays", which had been tested over a distance of 10 miles (16 km).
- In the largest seizure in the U.S. up to that time of illegal drugs, the British trawler Gabriella was seized in New York Harbor with 2,000 drums of alcohol, valued at $1,200,000. The ship's captain had been free on bond after being arrested the year before for smuggling of 1,200 cases of whiskey.
- Aviator Ferdinand Scholtz set a record for longest time aloft in a glider, keeping the unpowered airplane up for 14 hours and 8 minutes.
- Born: Mell Lazarus, American comic strip artist who created Miss Peach and Momma; in Brooklyn (d. 2016)
- Died: Ernest Ball, 47, American singer and songwriter

== May 4, 1927 (Wednesday) ==
- At its annual meeting at Columbia University, the Simplified Spelling Board of America announced partial success in getting dictionary recognition of its alternative spelling of twelve words, with "program" (programme) and "catalog" (catalogue) coming into popular use. Other words were "tho, altho, thru, thruout, thoro, thorofare, thoroly, decalog, pedagog and prolog".
- Captain Hawthorne C. Gray set an unofficial record for highest altitude reached by a human being, as he attained 42,470 feet (12,940 meters) in a balloon over Belleville, Illinois. Because of the rapid descent of the balloon, Gray parachuted out at 8,000 feet (2,400 m), disqualifying him from recognition by the Fédération Aéronautique Internationale (FAI).
- The Academy of Motion Picture Arts and Sciences, which now bestows the "Academy Awards" (or "Oscars") for excellence in film, was incorporated.
- Born: Terry Scott, English actor and comedian, in Watford, Hertfordshire (d. 1994)
- Died: General Rodolfo Gallegos, Mexican rebel leader who had led the April 19 train robbery and massacre, was shot while trying to flee federal authorities.

== May 5, 1927 (Thursday) ==
- French aviators Pierre de Serre de Saint-Roman and Hervé-Marcel Mouneyrès took off from Saint-Louis, Senegal, to make a transatlantic flight from Africa to South America. The pair never arrived. Wreckage of an airplane believed to be theirs washed ashore in Brazil on July 16, and a year later, a message in a bottle, possibly written by Saint-Roman, was found, suggesting that the plane had ditched in the ocean.
- To The Lighthouse, by Virginia Woolf, was first published.
- Germany's Nazi Party, the National Socialists, was banned by police from activities in Berlin's metropolitan area. Soon after, Joseph Goebbels was banned from speaking anywhere in Prussia.

== May 6, 1927 (Friday) ==
- The first radio broadcasts in Turkey began, from a station in Istanbul. Television would be introduced on January 31, 1968.
- Dr. Richard Meissner, a German chemist, claimed that he had developed an insulin substitute, which he called "horment", from the islands of Langerhans, which could be taken in tablet form, and which would cure diabetes.
- The romantic drama film 7th Heaven starring Janet Gaynor and Charles Farrell received its world premiere.
- Born: Mary Ellen Avery, American physician who discovered the cause of respiratory distress syndrome and contributed to its treatment and cure; in Camden, New Jersey (d. 2011)
- Died: Ansis Kaupēns, 31, Latvian serial killer suspected of murdering 19 people, was executed by hanging.

== May 7, 1927 (Saturday) ==
- San Francisco Mayor James Rolph Jr. dedicated the city's municipal airport at Mills Field, selected from nine proposed locations. Greatly expanded, the site was renamed in 1954 as the San Francisco International Airport.

== May 8, 1927 (Sunday) ==
- Captain Charles Nungesser and his navigator, Captain François Coli, departed from Paris at 5:18 am (11:18 pm Saturday in New York) in L'Oiseau Blanc (The White Bird), a Levasseur biplane, in an attempt to make the first nonstop airplane flight from Paris to New York. Expected to reach New York the next day, the plane never arrived, and was last seen approaching Cape Race, Newfoundland, at 10:00 am on Monday, with 1,000 miles (1,600 km) left of flying. The two men were never seen again.
- Died: Col. A.E. Humphreys, Denver multimillionaire, accidentally shot himself while packing guns and fishing tackle for a hunting trip.

== May 9, 1927 (Monday) ==
- The Parliament of Australia first convened in Canberra, following relocation of the capital from Melbourne. The Duke of York (and future King George VI) dedicated the new Parliament House and opened the joint session of Australian Senate and Australian House of Representatives, after being introduced by Prime Minister Stanley Bruce. The opening would be described in later years as the Duke's "first real test" of public speaking after working with therapist Lionel Logue to overcome stammering.
- Tornadoes swept through the south-central U.S., killing 230 people, and injuring over 800 other people in six states. Hardest hit were the towns of Poplar Bluff, Missouri, where 93 people died, and Nevada, Texas.
- A jury in New York convicted Mrs. Ruth Snyder and her accomplice, Henry Judd Gray, of the murder of her husband, Albert Snyder. The two would be executed separately, by electric chair, in 1928.
- Born:
  - Manfred Eigen, German biophysicist, recipient of the 1967 Nobel Prize in Chemistry; in Bochum (d. 2019)
  - Leonard Mandel, German-born American physicist and pioneer in the field of quantum optics; in Berlin (d. 2001)
- Died: Margaret Worth "Peggy" Porter, daughter of William Sidney "O. Henry" Porter, who had written stories under the pen name of "Miss O. Henry"

== May 10, 1927 (Tuesday) ==
- Sending a pistol by United States mail became illegal as a new law took effect (18 U.S.C. § 1715)
- The popular hymn Shall We Gather at the River? was recorded for the first time, by the Dixie Sacred Singers.
- Born: Nayantara Sahgal, Indian female novelist

== May 11, 1927 (Wednesday) ==
- Charles Lindbergh landed in St. Louis, 14 hours after taking off from San Diego the afternoon before. Lindbergh was "the only entrant in the Raymond Orteig $25,000 flight [contest] who plans to make the transatlantic flight alone", and was nicknamed "The Foolish Flyer" as a result.
- Born:
  - Mort Sahl, Canadian-born American comedian, in Montreal (d. 2021)
  - Gene Savoy, American author, explorer, and cleric, in Bellingham, Washington (d. 2007)
  - Bernard Fox, Welsh actor, in Port Talbot (d. 2016)
- Died: Juan Gris, 40, Spanish sculptor and painter, from uremia and kidney failure

== May 12, 1927 (Thursday) ==
- Under the direction of Scotland Yard, London police raided Arcost, Ltd., the office of the Soviet trade delegation. At 4:00 pm, telephone lines were cut and the building was sealed, with the 600 employees detained during a search. Evidence of Russian espionage was found and a break of diplomatic relations followed.

== May 13, 1927 (Friday) ==
- The equity market in Germany suffered a severe price drop after Reichsbank President Hjalmar Schacht had attempted to stop price speculation. Prices continued to decline following the "Black Friday".
- King George V issued a royal proclamation dropping the term "United Kingdom" from his title, referring to himself instead as "Georgius V, Dei Gratia Magnae Britanniae, Hiberniae et terrarum transmarinarum quae in ditione iunt Britannica Rex, Fidei Defensor, Indiae Imperator" ("George V, by the Grace of God, of Great Britain, Ireland, and the British Dominions beyond the Seas, King, Defender of the Faith, Emperor of India").
- FC Dynamo Kiev, a well-known association football club in Ukraine (former part of the Soviet Union), was founded.
- Born:
  - Herbert Ross, American film director; in Brooklyn (d. 2001)
  - Fred Hellerman, American songwriter; in Brooklyn (d. 2016)

== May 14, 1927 (Saturday) ==
- One man was killed and ten others injured when the bleachers at the Baker Bowl in Philadelphia collapsed during a game between the Phillies and the visiting St. Louis Cardinals. The Phillies were leading, 12–3, after six innings, and the Cardinals had one out in the 7th, when the right field pavilion seats fell without warning.
- The German luxury liner Cap Arcona was launched from the Blohm & Voss shipyard in Hamburg. The ship was 676 feet (206 m) long and could carry 1,315 passengers and made its first voyage on November 19. The ship was sunk on May 3, 1945, by the RAF, with 5,000 concentration camp inmates on board.

== May 15, 1927 (Sunday) ==
- The civil war in Nicaragua came to an end, with President Adolfo Díaz requesting U.S. President Calvin Coolidge to supervise elections that would be "free, fair, and impartial and not open to fraud or intimidation". With U.S. envoy Henry L. Stimson as the intermediary, Díaz and rebel leader José María Moncada had agreed to terms at Tipitapa, with Díaz to arrange elections following Moncada's troops completing disarmament. The voting took place in October 1928, with Moncada winning the presidency.

== May 16, 1927 (Monday) ==
- Admiral Richard E. Byrd, one of several aviators planning to fly from New York to Paris, told reporters that he would fly no earlier than the middle of the following week, after alerting his elderly mother in a phone conversation.
- A fireball was witnessed by thousands of spectators in Missouri and Kansas, streaking across the sky shortly before midnight and then exploding near the General Hospital on the south side of Kansas City, Missouri.
- Died: Sam Bernard, 64, English vaudeville comedian

== May 17, 1927 (Tuesday) ==
- The planned transatlantic flight of Lloyd W. Bertaud and Clarence Chamberlin, who were racing against Lindbergh and Byrd to become the first persons to fly an airplane from New York to Paris, was cancelled after an argument between the two fliers and their chief backer, Charles A. Levine.
- The town of Melville, Louisiana, population 1,028, was destroyed when a levee on the Atchafalaya River gave way.
- Died: Major Harold Geiger, 42, Army aviation pioneer, was killed in a plane crash.

== May 18, 1927 (Wednesday) ==
- Thirty-eight schoolchildren and six adults were killed by dynamite charges placed underneath the local school in Bath Township, Michigan. Andrew Kehoe, who had been treasurer of the township school board, had planted the bombs under the north wing, which housed 110 pupils and instructors, and the south wing, with 150 more. On the morning of the last day of classes, Kehoe set a two-minute timer and drove away, and at 9:43 a.m., the explosives under the north wing detonated. A short circuit in one of the wires prevented the destruction of the south wing. Kehoe, who had murdered his wife earlier and blew up his house and farm, killed himself and three other people half an hour later, detonating a car bomb while sitting in his Ford truck. With 41 deaths, the bombings remain the deadliest act of mass murder at a school in U.S. history.

== May 19, 1927 (Thursday) ==
- At the German city of Kassel, nine people were killed and 11 seriously injured after a 9-year-old boy released the emergency brake of a crowded streetcar.
- Died: Maurice Mouvet, 38, American dancer who attained fame in North America and Europe as "Maurice"

== May 20, 1927 (Friday) ==
- Charles Lindbergh took off from Roosevelt Field on New York's Long Island at 7:52 a.m. in his airplane, the Spirit of St. Louis, bound for Paris. With the plane carrying a 5,150 pounds (2,340 kg) load, he barely cleared a string of telegraph wires. Lindbergh told a police chief, "When I enter that cockpit, it's like going into the death chamber. When I get to Paris, it will be like getting a pardon from the governor."
- The independence of the Kingdom of Nejd and Hejaz, with the Sultan Ibn Saud as monarch, was recognized by the United Kingdom in the Treaty of Jeddah signed by representatives of the kings of both nations. On September 23, 1932, the nation would be renamed Saudi Arabia by King Ibn Saud.
- J. Willard Marriott started his first business, a 9-stool A&W root beer franchise located at 3128 14th Street, NW in Washington, D.C. Marriott would eventually found the worldwide Marriott Hotel chain.
- The Boeing 40A, first passenger airliner built by the Boeing company, was flown for the first time.
- Born: Bud Grant, American and Canadian professional football coach; in Superior, Wisconsin (d. 2023)
- Died: Eduard Bruckner, 64, German geographer and glaciologist

== May 21, 1927 (Saturday) ==
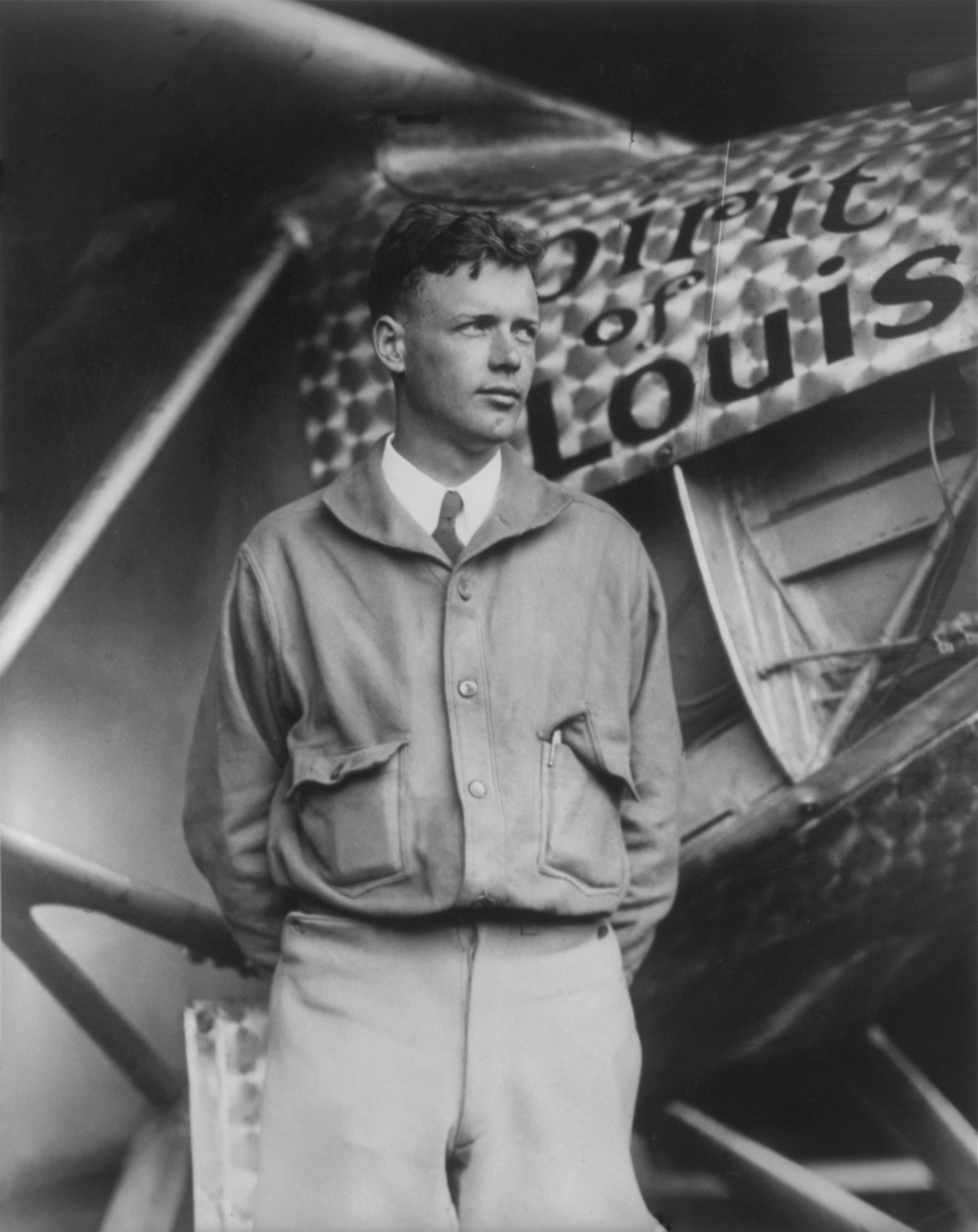
Charles Lindbergh and the Spirit of St. Louis

- Charles Lindbergh became the first man to complete a non-stop trans-Atlantic airplane flight, from New York to Paris. He landed his monoplane, the Spirit of St. Louis, at Le Bourget airfield near Paris at 10:21 p.m. local time (5:21 pm in New York), 33 hours and 29 minutes after taking off from New York. Lindbergh won the $25,000 Orteig Prize and a lifetime of fame and fortune.

== May 22, 1927 (Sunday) ==
- Striking at 6:32 in the morning local time (2232 UTC on May 21), an earthquake of magnitude 8.0 rocked the Gansu province of China and killed as many as 200,000 people.
- Carlos Ibáñez del Campo, who had been acting president since May 10, was elected the 20th President of Chile, receiving a reported 98% (223,741 out of 226,745 votes).
- Born:
  - George Andrew Olah (born Oláh András György), Hungarian-born American chemist, and 1994 Nobel Prize in Chemistry laureate; in Budapest (d. 2017)
  - Quinn Martin, American television producer known for shows such as The Fugitive and The Untouchables; in New York City (d. 1987)

== May 23, 1927 (Monday) ==
- The Kingdom of Cambodia's Ministry of Religion issued a nationwide letter declaring the new monotheistic religion of Caodaism to be a heresy, thus designating it as an illegal cult whose members could be punished under Articles 213 and 215 of the Cambodian penal code. Le Van Trung and 27 fellow believers had established the Cao Dai faith less than a year earlier.
- The Kingdom of Kerry, defending gaelic football champion of the Gaelic Athletic Association All-Ireland Championship, arrived in New York to begin its tour of the United States.

== May 24, 1927 (Tuesday) ==
- British Prime Minister Stanley Baldwin told the House of Commons that the United Kingdom intended to terminate relations with the Soviet Union because of espionage by Russian diplomats. Commons approved the move three days later, by a 357–111 vote.

== May 25, 1927 (Wednesday) ==
- U.S. Army Lieutenant James H. Doolittle became the first person to perform an "outside loop", a feat that aviators had been attempting since 1912, with at least two getting killed in the attempt. Doolittle, who would later become more famous as Lt. Gen. Jimmy Doolittle for a daring raid on Tokyo, climbed to 8,000 feet (2,400 m) over Dayton, Ohio, then turned the nose of his plane downward, being upside down at 6,000 feet (1,800 m), before flying back upward to his original altitude and completing the circle.
- Born: Robert Ludlum, American novelist who wrote The Bourne Identity and its sequels; in New York City (d. 2001)
- Died: St. Cristobal Magallanes, 57, and St. Agustin Caloca, 29, were both shot by a firing squad at Colotlán, Jalisco state. Both would be canonized as Roman Catholic saints on May 21, 2000.

== May 26, 1927 (Thursday) ==
- U.S. Secretary of the Treasury Andrew W. Mellon announced that he had approved a change in the size of United States currency to save printing costs. The bills would be 1 1/3 inches shorter and 3/4 inches narrower, with the first new bills to appear in the spring of 1928. In addition, consistent images were selected for the one-dollar bill (George Washington) and the two-dollar bill (Thomas Jefferson). Mellon commented that, "in time, each denomination will be immediately recognized from the picture it bears".
- Al Jolson was signed to play the lead in The Jazz Singer, the first talkie, after George Jessel (who originated the role in the 1925 Broadway play of the same name) backed out over artistic differences in the screenplay adaptation, and after being denied a salary bonus after the movie's last-minute change from a silent to a talkie. Principal photography was scheduled to begin in July.

== May 27, 1927 (Friday) ==
- The United Kingdom officially terminated diplomatic relations with the Soviet Union. A note from Foreign Secretary Neville Chamberlain, delivered to the Soviet legation at Chesham House in London, directed the chargé d'affaires and his staff to leave the country within ten days.
- Born:
  - Ralph Carmichael, American composer and arranger; in Quincy, Illinois (d. 2021)
  - Heinrich Holland, German biochemist; in Mannheim (d. 2012)

== May 28, 1927 (Saturday) ==
- The sport of greyhound racing was introduced to Australia, with spectators there seeing for the first time the "mechanical rabbit" that raced ahead of the fleet canines.

== May 29, 1927 (Sunday) ==
- An Italian record crowd of 60,000 fans, including Fascist dictator Benito Mussolini, King Victor Emmanuel III, and Spain's Crown Prince Alfonso turned out for the first soccer football game in the new Stadio Littoriale in Bologna to watch Italy defeat Spain 2–0 in a friendly match.

== May 30, 1927 (Monday) ==
- Jimmy Cooney of the Chicago Cubs made an unassisted triple play in a game against the Pittsburgh Pirates. The very next day, Johnny Neun of the Detroit Tigers duplicated the feat. Only five players had accomplished the feat before Cooney and Neun; it did not happen again until July 30, 1968. Cooney himself had been tagged out in the last one on May 7, 1925.
- George Souders, a 24-year-old driving his first major auto race ever, won the 15th annual Indianapolis 500.
- Born: Clint Walker, American TV actor (Cheyenne); in Hartford, Illinois (d. 2018)

== May 31, 1927 (Tuesday) ==
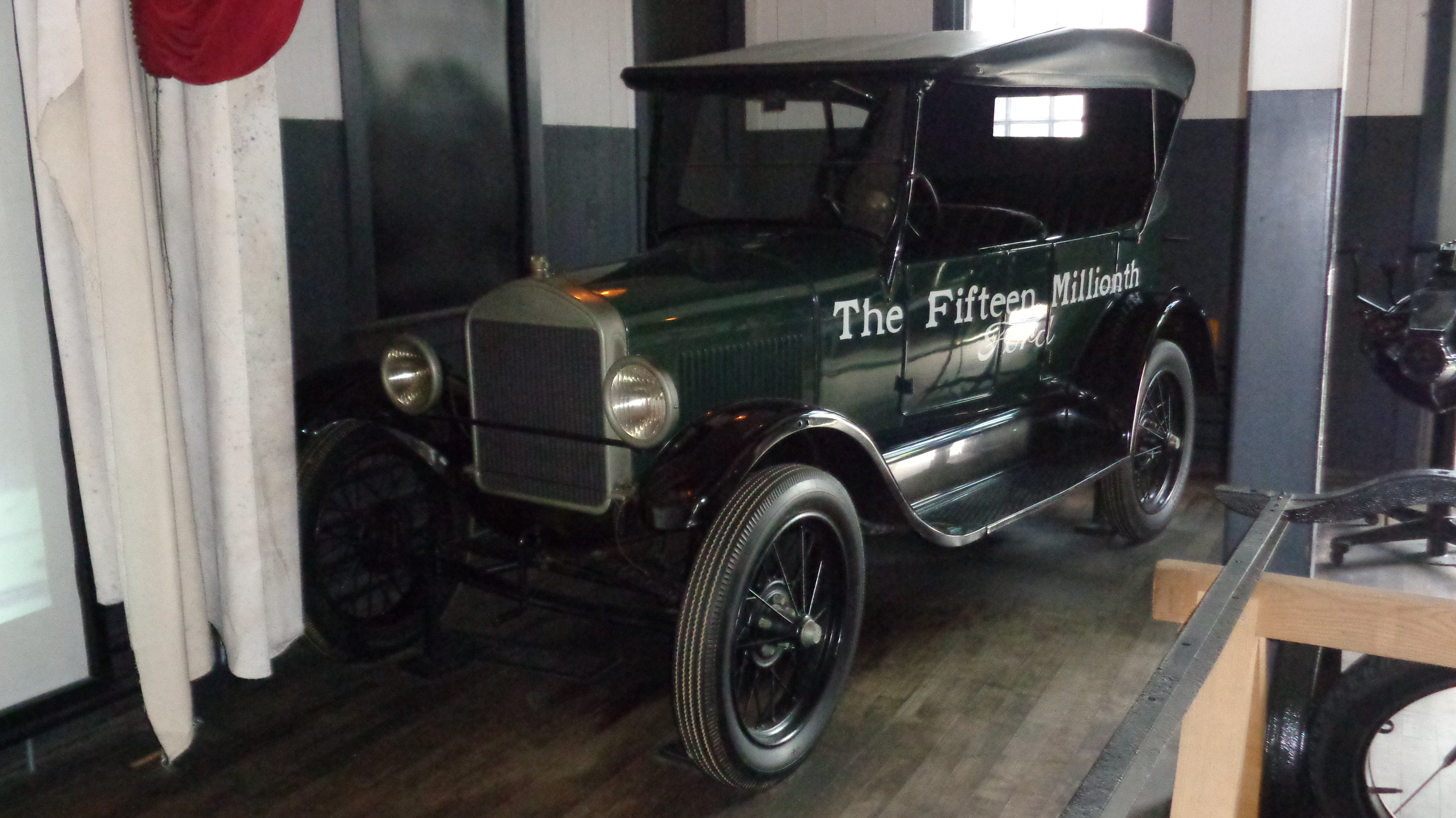
Model T-15007033

- The 15,007,033rd and last Ford Model T, after a 19-year run that began in 1908. Henry Ford had announced the week before that production would halt at the end of the month, that 24 plants would close and 10,000 employees would be laid off. Ford car dealers across the United States all received a telegram on May 26, the day the 15,000,000th Model T was driven by Ford out of the factory in Highland Park, Michigan, that the factories were being retooled to make way for the new Model A, which would be introduced in December. The Model T would hold the record for the most popular model of car in history until February 17, 1972, when the 15,007,034th Volkswagen Beetle was produced.
- Died: Francis Grierson, 79, American novelist and pianist, died while giving a concert for friends.
