= Georg Mancelius =

Baltic German theologian (1593–1654)

- Born: 24 June 1593; Grenzhof, Augstkalne Parish, Duchy of Courland and Semigallia
- Died: 17 March 1654 (aged 60); Mitau, Duchy of Courland and Semigallia

Georg Mancelius (Latvian: Georgs Mancelis, born 24 June / 4 July 1593 in Grenzhof (now Mežmuiža in Augstkalne Parish), Courland; died 17 March 1654 in Mitau) was a Baltic German Lutheran theologian in what is now Latvia. He wrote the first dictionary of the Latvian language. From 1635 to 1636 he was Vice Rector of the University of Tartu and from 1636 Rector.

== Life ==
Born the son of Kaspar Mancelius, a preacher, he attended the schools in Mitau from 1603 and in Riga in 1608. In 1611, he enrolled at the University of Frankfurt (Oder). At that time, Brandenburg was undergoing a denominational reorientation towards the Reformed faith. Mancelius therefore went to the University of Rostock in 1612 and returned to his homeland in 1615. There he was appointed pastor to Wallhof by Duke Friedrich in 1616, moved to Selburg in 1620 in the same role and became senior pastor at St John's Church in Dorpat in 1625.

In Dorpat, the administrative centre of the Swedish provinces in the Baltic region, he took over the post of rector of the town school in 1626, became a grammar school professor at the local grammar school in 1630 and was appointed professor of theology when the University of Dorpat was founded by Gustav II Adolf of Sweden in 1632. As a result, he also became an assessor at the local consistory, was promoted to licentiate in theology in 1633 and was rector of the academic institution in 1636. On 23 October 1637, he returned to Courland and became court preacher and confessor to Duke Frederick, a position he held until the end of his life. His writings describe an earthquake he experienced in 1616, as well as academic works, court sermons, poems and treatises on the Latvian language. The Latvian orthography he introduced was still used in the 20th century.

== Work ==
Georg Mancelius wrote and translated in German, Latin and Latvian. The first known books that have survived to this day were published in German in 1619. One was published in Rostock – “Simple instructions on how <...> to find comfort in the word of God” (Einfaltige Anleitung wie ein Creutztragender Angefochtener und Verfolgeter Christ sich auss Gottes Wort troesten auch wider die gemeinesten Anfechtungen so fast einem jeden Menschen begegnen koennen auffrichten soll; a copy is in the Academic Library of Tallinn University), and the other – “Theological and historical physical reflections on the movement of the earth” (Meditatio theologistoricophysica de terrae motu) – was published in Riga and is in the Library of the University of Latvia. This book contains not only theological but also natural questions, for example, information about the earthquake of June 30, 1616 in Zemgale is collected in six chapters. Poems in Latin have also survived to this day, but more books have been published in Latvian. All of Mancelius' Latvian books are considered convolutes (several printed works in one binding) and were published in Riga by Gerhard Schröder's printing house.

The first to be published was the "Latvian Guidebook" (Lettisch Vade mecum), or the so-called Vidzeme Lutheran Handbook. Two surviving copies are known to exist to this day (in Riga and London). This book is a convolute, i.e. six books bound together: a collection of pericopes (texts of the Gospels and Epistles for each Sunday), to which is added the story of the suffering of Jesus Christ and the destruction of Jerusalem, spiritual songs, psalms, collections and other prayers, Martin Luther's Small Catechism and the Book of Wisdom of Zerac. It is based on the earlier Lutheran handbook (1587, 1615), which Mancelius had revised and supplemented with a new section – the Book of Wisdom of Zīrakas, which is the first book of the Bible in Latvian in a separate edition and the first printed independent translation by Mancelius. This edition is a new turn in the history of the Latvian written language, as it uses new writing principles.

In 1638, the first Latvian dictionary “Latvietis” (Lettus) was published – Mancelius’s most significant work in linguistics. It was also well known abroad and is kept in many libraries today. The dictionary is mostly arranged in alphabetical order, and includes about 6,000 Latvian words. Next to the German word, a corresponding Latvian word is placed, sometimes several synonyms or explanations are given; some terms in Latin also appear, which are most often given before the Latvian lemma. This book by Mancelius is also a convolute, as the dictionary is followed by “Latvian Phraseology” (Phraseologia Lettica, 1638), which consists of 51 chapters. These chapters thematically summarize German words and phrases, which are translated into Latvian. Mancelius began it with god, man and soul, but ended with the names of cities and numerals. The appendix to this phraseology section is ten conversations, which are original compositions by Mancelius. They include a wide variety of situations, such as buying a cart and horses, plowing, mowing hay, carrying manure, and others. Different personal names were invented for each conversation, which were Latvianized, for example, in the German part Hans and Michel, but in Latvian – Ansis and Miķelis. The last conversation contains a scene about a German pastor working in Tērbat, who speaks Latvian very well and has recently left the city, which may be an indirect reference to Mancelius himself (in 1638 he moved to Jelgava). Mancelius ends the section of the book with a proverb that has no German equivalent – “Give glory to God, he fills us with a full bowl”. These books are accompanied in a convolute by “Proverbs of Solomon” (Die Sprüche Salomonis, 1637), which is also the first edition, the first translation into Latvian.

From 1643 to 1644, a repeated edition of “Latvian Guide” followed, which has survived to this day in several copies in Latvia, Russia and Denmark. This is not just a reprint of the previous 1631 edition, it is improved and supplemented by Mancelius. The most significant changes are in spelling and morphology, for example, the consistent abandonment of the older plural dative ending -ms, which was replaced by -m (teems Kohkeems→teem Kohkeem), and others.

The most voluminous and original work of Mancelius is “The Long-awaited Collection of Latvian Sermons” (Lang=gewünschte Lettische Postill, 1654). It is a collection of postillas or pericopes (excerpts from the Bible) and the sermons that follow them, arranged according to the church year. The pericopes in this collection are included from previous translations by Mancelius, but the sermons are composed originally, this book is the first original composition in Latvian – it is the first time that such a large volume of untranslated texts in Latvian appears in it. The book has three separately designed parts with their own title pages – a total of more than 1250 pages. Copies of it have survived to this day both in Latvia and abroad. The language in the sermons composed by Mancelius is figurative and oratorical, and contains many examples and proverbs of the language used in the people.

Georg Mancelius' books were published in Latvian over a period of 23 years; with the exception of the dictionary ‘Latvietis’, they were reprinted after his death.

== Contribution ==
Georg Mancelius contribution to the creation of the Latvian written language is very significant, and he is considered the most prominent author of the 17th century. He not only improved the earlier editions of the church manual, but was the first to print some books of the Bible in a separate edition, a dictionary, examples of phraseology, and sermons in Latvian. His works strengthened the Semigallian dialects of the Middle dialect as the basis of the Latvian written language. Also significant are the prefaces to Georg Mancelius' books, which contain linguistic information about the Latvian language, especially "Latvian Guide" (1631), where a description of the phonetics of the Latvian language can be found.

The works written by Georg Mancelius are important not only in the study of the written language, but are also important as cultural and historical sources. They discuss both everyday things, historical events, and other phenomena significant for the era, such as famine, plague, markets, and others.

== Selected works ==
- 1619 - De terrae motu (earthquake of 30 June 1616 in Zemgale)
- 1631/1643 - Vademecum (guide to spiritual texts in Latvian)
- 1638 - Lettus, das ist Wortbuch sampt angehengtem täglichem Gebrauch der Lettischen Sprache. Riga, 1638 (long title: Lettus, Das ist Wortbuch, Sampt angehengtem täglichem Gebrauch der Lettischen Sprache; Allen vnd jeden Außheimischen, die in Churland, Semgallen vnd Lettischem Liefflande bleiben, vnd sich redlich nehren wollen, zu Nutze verfertigt durch GEORGIVM MANCELIVM Anno M. DC. XXXVIII)
- 1654 - Langgewünschte Lettische Postill (Latvian Sermon Book), reissued in 1699, 1746, 1769, 1823
