= Augstkalne Parish =

Parish in Dobele Municipality, Latvia

- parish of Latvia
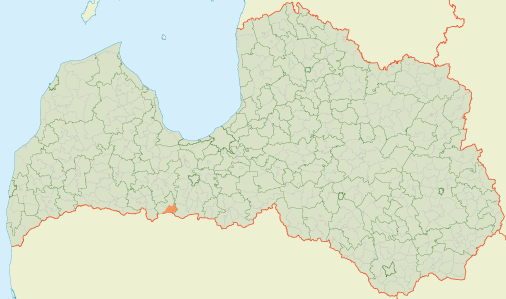
- 56°24′27″N 23°22′33″E
- Country: Latvia

Area
  - Total: 64.51 km^{2} (24.91 sq mi)
  - Land: 63.62 km^{2} (24.56 sq mi)
  - Water: 0.89 km^{2} (0.34 sq mi)

Population (1 January 2024)
  - Total: 772
  - Density: 12/km^{2} (31/sq mi)

Augstkalne Parish (Latvian: Augstkalnes pagasts) is an administrative unit of Dobele Municipality in the Semigallia region of Latvia. At the beginning of 2014, the population of the parish was 1067. The administrative center is the village of Augstkalne.

== Towns, villages and settlements of Augstkalne parish ==
- Augstkalne (location of Mežmuiža Manor)
- Dzeguzēni
- Klinti

== Notable residents ==
- Georg Mancelius (1593-1654), German Baltic Lutheran theologian and linguist, rector of the University of Tartu, author of the first Latvian dictionary (1638).
- Christoph Friedrich Neander (de) (1723-1802), German Baltic Lutheran pastor, Enlightenment movement worker, author of Kurzeme songbook (1766).

== See also ==
- Mežmuiža Manor
