= Ansis (given name) =

Male given name

- Gender: Male
- Name day: 26 January

Origin
- Origin: From German Hans and Johannes
- Region of origin: Latvia

Ansis is a Latvian masculine given name derived from the German language male name Johannes and its diminutive Hans and first recorded in Latvia in 1533.

People bearing the name Ansis include:

- Ansis Artums (1908–1997), Latvian landscape painter
- Ansis Bērziņš (1940–2021), Latvian film producer and director
- Ansis Brūns (born 1989), Latvian javelin thrower
- Ansis Dāle (born 1967), Latvian windsurfer
- Ansis Epners (1937–2003), Latvian documentary filmmaker
- Ansis Kaupēns (1895–1927), Latvian criminal and serial killer
- Ansis Pūpols (born 1975), Latvian politician
- Ansis Regža (born 1963), Latvian curler and curling coach
