= March 1972 =

Month of 1972

<<	March 1972					>>
Su	Mo	Tu	We	Th	Fr	Sa
			1	2	3	4
5	6	7	8	9	10	11
12	13	14	15	16	17	18
19	20	21	22	23	24	25
26	27	28	29	30	31

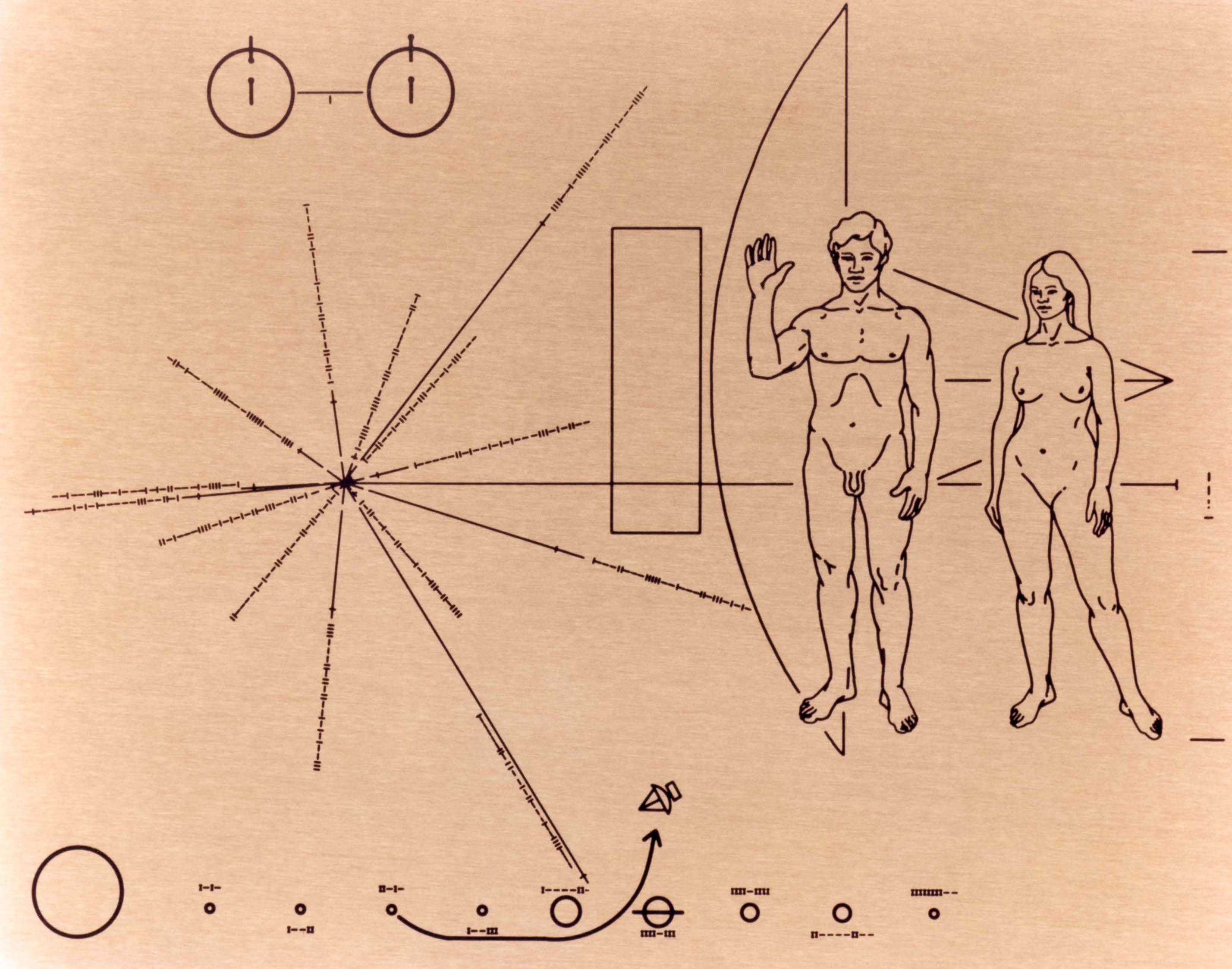
March 2, 1972: Pioneer 10 launched with a message from Earth

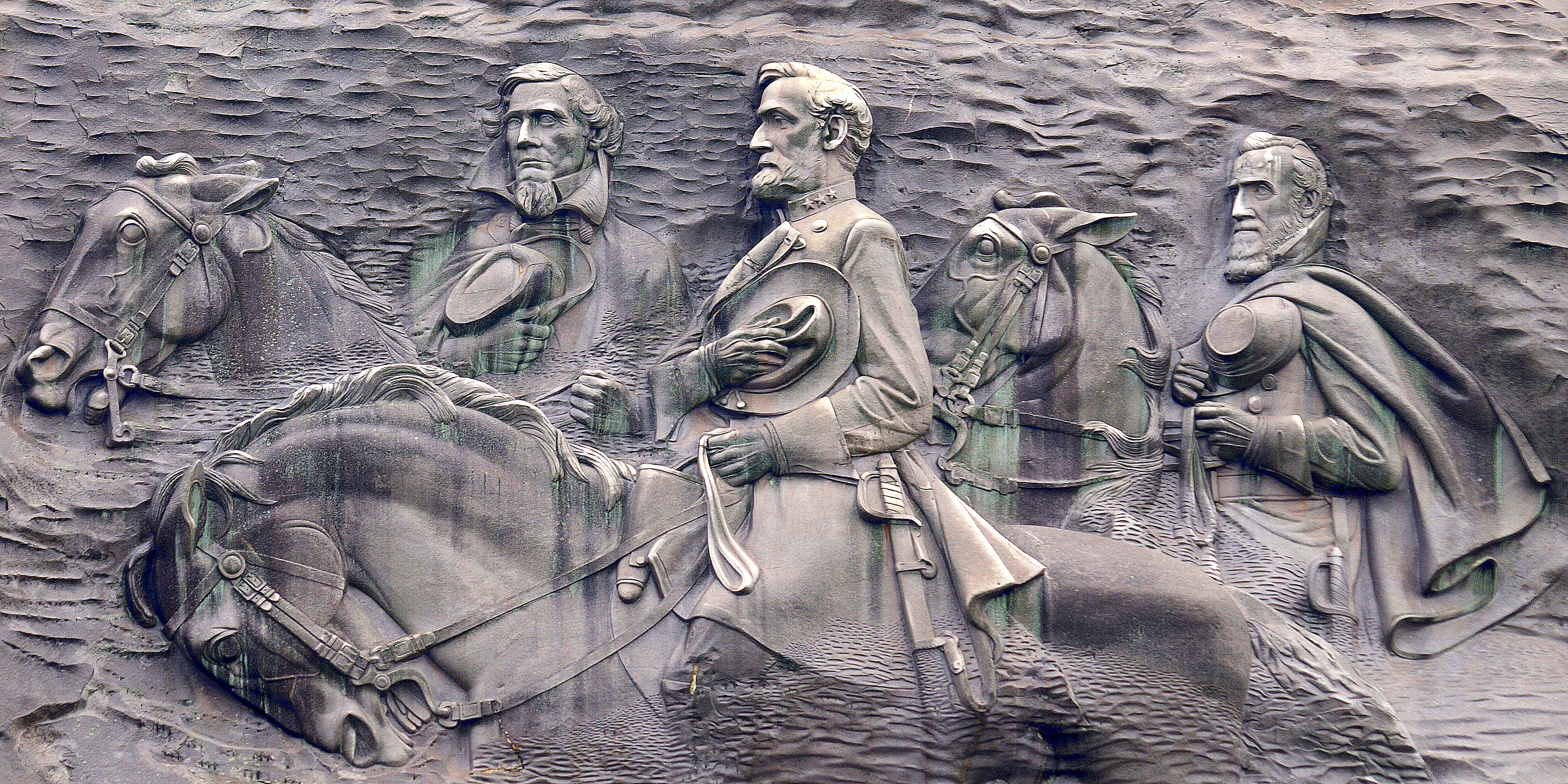
March 3, 1972: Stone Mountain bas relief finished after 48 years

The following events occurred in March 1972:

== March 1, 1972 (Wednesday) ==
- The Buffalo River in Arkansas became the first American river to become part of the protected National Wild and Scenic Rivers program.
- Juan María Bordaberry was inaugurated as the newly elected President of Uruguay, and soon assumed dictatorial power, including the operation of the nation's courts by the military under his command.

== March 2, 1972 (Thursday) ==
- Pioneer 10 was launched from the Cape Kennedy at 8:49 p.m. Bearing a 6-by-9-inch gold anodized plaque that contained a message for alien civilizations, the American probe attained a record speed of more than 30,000 m.p.h. on its way to the planet Jupiter, which it would reach on December 3, 1973. Pioneer 10 became, on June 13, 1983, the first man-made object to depart the Solar System, moving toward the star Aldebaran. The last transmissions from Pioneer 10 were received on March 31, 1997, and the last signal was received on January 22, 2003.
- Edward Heath, Prime Minister of the United Kingdom, announced in the House of Commons that the Government of the UK would no longer use the "five techniques" of torture in the interrogation of prisoners. Heath's decision came on the same day as the publication of the "Parker Report" from a committee of inquiry chaired by Hubert Parker, Lord Chief Justice of England and Wales, finding the techniques to be illegal and immoral. The five techniques were wall-standing (prolonged standing in a stress position, hooding to prevent sight, loud noise, sleep deprivation and deprivation of food and drink, and had been used in Northern Ireland starting on August 9, 1971 in Operation Demetrius, the mass arrest of 342 suspected Irish Republican Army members and sympathizers.
- The student senate at Stanford University voted, 18–4, to accept the recommendation that the school's athletic teams drop the nickname "Stanford Indians". Other college and high school teams would follow, retiring names such as Indians, Redskins, Braves, and other Native American referencing mascots.
- Born: Phil Watkins From Pontypool, South Wales UK, born on this day.

== March 3, 1972 (Friday) ==
- After more than 48 years, the carving of the bas relief sculpture on Stone Mountain (near Atlanta) was completed under the direction of Walker Hancock. The 90 foot high representation of Jefferson Davis, Robert E. Lee and Stonewall Jackson had been started on June 23, 1923, by Gutzon Borglum.
- Mohawk Airlines Flight 405 crashed into a house on Edgewood Avenue in Albany, New York, killing 16 of the 47 people on board, and one person in an upstairs apartment. The impact happened at 8:48 pm after the commuter plane lost power during a snowstorm.
- Born: Darren Anderton, English footballer, in Southampton

== March 4, 1972 (Saturday) ==
- "About 1.1 million young people reached adulthood at midnight", as the New York Times described it, when a law took effect in California to lower the age of majority from 21 to 18.
- The First Time Ever I Saw Your Face, as sung by Roberta Flack, entered the Billboard Magazine charts at No. 77. Within six weeks, it hit No. 1 and remained for six more weeks, becoming the best selling single of 1972.
- Stoke City beat Chelsea 2–1 to win the 1972 Football League Cup Final, before a crowd of 100,000 at Wembley Stadium.
- Born: Pae Gil-Su, North Korean gymnast

== March 5, 1972 (Sunday) ==
- Prime Minister Edward Heath informed the House of Commons that the United Kingdom had renounced the use of the five techniques for deep interrogation (hooding, wall-standing, subjection to noise, "relative" deprivation of food and drink, and sleep deprivation).

== March 6, 1972 (Monday) ==
- The Central Committee of the Soviet Communist Party adopted a resolution condemning Tbilisi city authorities in the Georgian Soviet Socialist Republic for corruption, failure to meet economic goals, and liberalism in personnel policies. The action was the beginning of the end of the rule of Georgian First Secretary Vasil Mzhavanadze, and his replacement in that job by Eduard Shevardnadze.
- United States immigration authorities revoked the visa of John Lennon.
- Born: Shaquille O'Neal, American NBA star, in Newark, New Jersey

== March 7, 1972 (Tuesday) ==
- TWA Flight 7 was half an hour into its flight from New York to Los Angeles when the airline's officials were notified that it had a time bomb on board. The plane landed back at JFK at 12:10 pm. A trained German shepherd named "Brandy" sniffed out the explosive, found in an attache case in the cockpit. With five pounds of C4, the device would have destroyed the Boeing 707, with 52 on board, in midflight at 1:00 pm. Police defused the explosive with 12 minutes to spare.
- Federal Express was granted an FAA Operating Certificate by the Federal Aviation Administration, permitting it to operate jet service to deliver packages.

== March 8, 1972 (Wednesday) ==
- As the extortion plot against Trans World Airlines continued, a C4 packed time bomb was found on a second Boeing 707. Hidden in a bathroom, the bomb exploded at 3:55 a.m. while the jet sat, unoccupied, at the airport in Las Vegas. Two searches had failed to detect the explosive. The plane had arrived seven hours earlier from New York. The plotters had warned TWA about bombs on four separate flights, and had demanded a $2,000,000 ransom.
- The highest recorded speed for a gust of wind was measured at 207 m.p.h. during a storm at Thule Air Base in Greenland.
- President Nixon issued Executive Order 11652, setting standards for top secret, secret, and confidential classifications of government documents, as well as a schedule of declassification. EO 11652 was superseded by the orders of later American Presidents, and classified information is now governed by Executive Order 13292.
- Born: Andrey Melnichenko, Russian billionaire, in Gomel, Byelorussian SSR, Soviet Union
- Died: Erich von dem Bach, 73, Nazi SS-Obergruppenführer who crushed the Warsaw Uprising

== March 9, 1972 (Thursday) ==
- The Volkskammer voted to legalize abortion in East Germany, although 14 legislators voted against the bill and another 8 abstained, a rarity in a Communist state. The new law gave a woman, rather than a government board, the right to terminate her pregnancy within the first 12 weeks after conception, effective immediately. The number of legal abortions went from 18,700 in 1971 to 115,600 in 1972.
- Died: Basil O'Connor, 80, co-founder of the March of Dimes

== March 10, 1972 (Friday) ==
- Broadcaster Larry King was cleared of charges of grand larceny that had been brought by a former business partner. His arrest in December 1971 nearly ruined his career, and King would work at various radio jobs before getting a nationally syndicated talk show in 1978. In 1985, he would launch Larry King Live on CNN.
- Born:
  - Takashi Fujii, Japanese comedian, in Toyonaka, Osaka;
  - Matt Kenseth, American NASCAR driver, in Cambridge, Wisconsin
  - Michael Lucas (stage name for Andrei Lvovich Treivas), Russian-born gay pornographic actor and director, founder of Lucas Entertainment; in Moscow
  - Timbaland (stage name for Timothy Zachery Mosley), American rapper; in Norfolk, Virginia.

== March 11, 1972 (Saturday) ==
- Carnival Cruise Lines made its very first voyage, as the Mardi Gras departed Miami for an 8-day cruise ... and ran aground on a sandbar. The 530 passengers, most of whom were travel agents and their families, continued to enjoy themselves until tugboats dislodged the ship the next day, and the new company received national publicity from the incident.
- Died:
  - Fredric Brown, 65, science fiction and mystery author
  - Zack Wheat, 83, Baseball Hall of Famer and Brooklyn Dodgers outfielder

== March 12, 1972 (Sunday) ==
- Britain's Granada Television telecast a one-hour drama by Brian Clark, called Whose Life Is It Anyway?. The videotaped story became a popular stage play in 1978 and a film in 1981.
- The European satellite TD-1A was launched, designed to be the first to measure the ultraviolet spectrum.
- The last troops from India were withdrawn from Bangladesh, whose independence they had secured from Pakistan in December.
- Gordie Howe's No. 9 jersey was retired by the Detroit Red Wings and Bill Russell's No. 6 was retired by the Boston Celtics.

== March 13, 1972 (Monday) ==
- The Australian soap opera Number 96 made its debut on Network Ten, after an ad campaign with the slogan "Tonight at 8:30, Television loses its virginity!". During its five-year run, the show would break taboos against showing nudity and sexual intercourse.
- On United States television, The Merv Griffin Show returned as a syndicated program after two years at the CBS Network's 11:30 time slot and began a successful and award-winning run that ended in 1986.
- Clifford Irving and his wife Edith pleaded guilty in a New York federal court to charges of conspiracy to defraud and grand larceny. Irving admitted that he had made up the autobiography of Howard Hughes, for which he had received an advance from McGraw-Hill.
- Born: Common (rapper) (born Lonnie Rashid Lynn), American rapper and actor; in Chicago, Illinois

== March 14, 1972 (Tuesday) ==
- Sterling Airways Flight 267, which was bringing Danish vacationers home from a holiday in Sri Lanka, crashed on its approach to the Dubai airport in the United Arab Emirates. All 112 people on board were killed.

== March 15, 1972 (Wednesday) ==
- The Godfather, directed by Francis Ford Coppola, debuted in five cinemas in New York City, and would set a record (which stood until 1975) for the highest-grossing film in history, taking in $87,500,000 in its first release.
- Italian multimillionaire and radical Giangiacomo Feltrinelli was found dead in the Milan suburb of Segrate, apparently the victim of his own bomb. Feltrinelli had apparently planned to destroy the pylon of a high-voltage power line in order to plunge the area into darkness, when the explosive went off prematurely. He bled to death from his injuries.
- King Hussein of Jordan unveiled his plan for the "United Arab Kingdom", a federation consisting of the existing Hashemite Kingdom of Jordan, and a Palestinian Arab state on Jordan's former territories on the Israeli occupied West Bank, each with their own parliament, united under one monarch. The UAK would be dependent upon a treaty between Jordan and Israel. The PLO and other Arab nations opposed the plan.
- Born: Mark Hoppus, Bassist and vocalist of the Pop Punk band blink-182, in Ridgecrest, California
- Died: Linda Jones, 27, African-American pop singer, of diabetes

== March 16, 1972 (Thursday) ==
- Demolition of the Pruitt–Igoe public housing project in St. Louis began with the implosion of the first of 33 identical eleven-storey buildings, less than 20 years after the complex had been opened. Crime-ridden and marked by low quality materials, the project's occupancy began declining three years after its 1954 dedication. By 1976, the last of the Pruitt–Igoe apartments had been torn down.
- President Nixon addressed the nation at 10:00 pm EST to propose a moratorium on forced busing to achieve desegregation in American schools, making the issue part of his re-election campaign.
- A 160 vehicle pileup on the M1 motorway at Luton, England, killed nine people and injured 51 others. The accident came only four months after the deaths of nine people on the same stretch of highway. In both cases, fog and industrial pollution precipitated the chain reaction.
- Died: Pie Traynor, 73, Baseball Hall of Famer and Pirates third baseman

== March 17, 1972 (Friday) ==
- Lon Nol proclaimed himself to be the first President of the Khmer Republic, an office that had been vacant for the first two years of the republic's existence. The monarchy, abolished in 1970, was restored in 1993.
- Born: Mia Hamm, American soccer player, in Selma, Alabama

== March 18, 1972 (Saturday) ==
- Larry Miller of the Carolina Cougars set the all-time scoring record for the American Basketball Association (ABA), with 67 points in a 139–125 win over the Memphis Pros, breaking Zelmo Beaty's record of 63 that had been set three weeks earlier. It was also a record for highest number of points by a guard in any league. With 25 field goals and 17 free throws, none of Miller's shots was an ABA 3-pointer.
- Born: Dane Cook, American comedian, in Boston

== March 19, 1972 (Sunday) ==
- Prime Ministers Indira Gandhi of India and Sheikh Mujibur Rahman of Bangladesh signed the Indo-Bangladeshi Treaty of Friendship, Cooperation and Peace during Gandhi's visit to Dhaka.
- The Immaculata University Mighty Macs won the first women's college basketball championship in the U.S., the AIAW women's basketball tournament, defeating the West Chester State College Golden Rams, 52 to 49. Both teams were from small colleges in Chester County, Pennsylvania. Theresa Shank of Immaculata was the high scorer, with 26 points in the tournament played at the Illinois State University campus in Normal, Illinois.

== March 20, 1972 (Monday) ==
- Twenty-four mountaineers were killed by an avalanche on Japan's Mount Fuji, and another six were missing and presumed dead.
- The Los Angeles Lakers set an NBA record for the largest margin of victory (63 points) in 162 to 99 win over the visiting Golden State Warriors. The mark stood for 19 years before being broken by Cleveland's 148–80 win over Miami.
- Born: Alex Kapranos, Scottish singer and musician (Franz Ferdinand), in Almondsbury, Gloucestershire, England
- Died Marilyn Maxwell, 50, American actress

== March 21, 1972 (Tuesday) ==
- The United States Supreme Court struck down, as unconstitutional, a Tennessee law requiring one year's residency in the state before a person could register to vote. For the 6–1 majority ruling, Thurgood Marshall wrote "30 days appears to be an ample period of time for the State to complete whatever administrative tasks are necessary to prevent fraud – and a year, or three months, too much". At the time, all but a few states required at least six months' residency. The ruling, made in Dunn v. Blumstein (405 U.S. 330) effectively opened the way for as many as 5.5 million people to become eligible to register.
- Georgios Papadopoulos, the dictator of the Kingdom of Greece, moved one step closer to abolishing the monarchy. In addition to being Prime Minister of Greece, as well as its Foreign Minister, Defense Minister, and "Minister to the Premier" in charge of government agencies, Papadopoulos took on the ceremonial powers of the King as well. Georgios Zoitakis, who had been the regent after King Constantine II went into exile in 1967, was fired by the Cabinet at the request of Papadopoulos, who then took over the job himself.
- Born:
  - Chris Candido, American professional wrestler, in Spring Lake, New Jersey (d. 2005)
  - Derartu Tulu, Ethiopian 10,000 meter medalist, in Bekoji

== March 22, 1972 (Wednesday) ==
- The proposed Equal Rights Amendment was approved by the United States Senate, 84–8, after passing the House on October 12, 354–23, and sent to the states to consider ratification. Although 35 states ratified the amendment by the original 1979 deadline (later extended to 1982), the ERA fell short of the necessary approval by at least 38 states.
- The Shafer Commission (formally the National Commission on Marihuana and Drug Abuse), a 13-member panel created by Congress, unanimously recommended the removal of federal and state restrictions against the personal possession and private use of marijuana. The Commission's surprising conclusions were not accepted by President Nixon or by Congress.
- The United States Supreme Court ruled, in Eisenstadt v. Baird (405 U.S. 438), that unmarried people had the same rights to contraceptive products as married people did, striking down a Massachusetts law, and extending the protection of the 1965 ruling in Griswold v. Connecticut.
- Born:
  - Shawn Bradley, American NBA player, in Landstuhl, West Germany
  - Elvis Stojko, Canadian figure skater, in Newmarket, Ontario
  - Cory Lidle, New York Yankees pitcher, in Hollywood, California (killed in plane crash, 2006)
- Died: Jeremiah Milbank, 85, American philanthropist and co-founder of the March of Dimes

== March 23, 1972 (Thursday) ==
- The first media event surrounding the recently discovered, cave-dwelling Tasaday people took place in the Philippines as reporters, scientists, and VIPs (including Charles Lindbergh) were brought in by helicopter to meet a group of people who had never made it out of the Stone Age. It was not until after the 1986 overthrow of Philippine President Ferdinand Marcos that it was discovered that the 26 Tasaday "cavemen" had been ordinary people going along with a hoax.
- The world's first Green Party meeting took place in the Hobart Town Hall, convened by Dr. Richard Jones
- Born: Joe Calzaghe, Welsh boxer and world middleweight champion, in London
- Died: John Carnell, 59, British science fiction publisher

== March 24, 1972 (Friday) ==
- Edward Heath, Prime Minister of the United Kingdom of Great Britain and Northern Ireland, announced direct rule from London after half a century of Northern Irish autonomy. The bicameral Parliament of Northern Ireland, commonly referred to as "Stormont", was suspended, and Prime Minister of Northern Ireland Brian Faulkner was replaced by William Whitelaw, named to the newly created post of Secretary of State for Northern Ireland.
- Died: Cristóbal Balenciaga, 77, Spanish fashion designer

== March 25, 1972 (Saturday) ==
- The 254th and last original episode of the TV series Bewitched was broadcast, ending a run that had started on September 17, 1964.
- The UCLA Bruins beat Florida State 81–76 to win their sixth consecutive NCAA basketball championship, their eighth overall, and their 45th consecutive victory.
- Following fraudulent elections in El Salvador, Colonel Benjamin Mejia led an attempted coup in order to prevent the winner, Arturo Armando Molina, from taking office as President. Despite the rebels' temporary capture of President Fidel Sánchez Hernández, the rebellion failed to attract support from other military units, and was put down the next day, after more than 100 people had been killed and over 200 wounded.
- The 17th Eurovision Song Contest was held at the Usher Hall, Edinburgh, UK. It was won by Luxembourg's Vicky Leandros, with "Après Toi".

== March 26, 1972 (Sunday) ==
- Lord Carrington, Britain's Secretary of State for Defence, reached an agreement with Malta's Prime Minister, Dom Mintoff, renewing the United Kingdom's lease of military bases on the Mediterranean island for another seven years, and at triple the previous rent. After the British lease had expired in September, Mintoff had threatened to sign an agreement with the Soviet Union or with Libya. The new payment was $37,000,000 per annum. British forces would leave Malta permanently on March 31, 1979.
- Died: Oskar Rescher, 88, German scholar (b. 1883)

== March 27, 1972 (Monday) ==
- Venera 8 was launched from the Soviet Union to explore the planet Venus, where it would land on July 22.
- President Idi Amin ordered all Israelis to leave Uganda. For the past ten years, Israel had trained Ugandan paratroopers, but Amin broke relations after forming an alliance with Libya.
- The comic strip Funky Winkerbean made its debut, introduced by King Features Syndicate. The author was Tom Batiuk, a 24-year-old art teacher at Eastern Heights Junior High School in Elyria, Ohio . Funky ("just and average kid trying to figure out a confusing world ... not to mention plane geometry") introduced himself and his friends, Roland, Les and Lavinia in the first day's strip.
- Born: Jimmy Floyd Hasselbaink, Dutch footballer, in Paramaribo, Suriname
- Died:
  - M. C. Escher, 73, Dutch lithographer of "impossible objects" (e.g., "Relativity")
  - Lorenzo Wright, 45, African-American athlete, 1948 Olympic gold medalist and Detroit schools official, was stabbed to death by his wife during an argument at their home

== March 28, 1972 (Tuesday) ==
- The first elections, since 1963, in the Palestinian cities of the West Bank were carried out under Israel's supervision. Voters in Nablus, Jenin, Tulkarm, Qalqilya and Jericho (Ariha) went to the polls to vote for local representatives, nearly five years after previous scheduled voting had been canceled. In 1967, after the West Bank had been captured from Jordan in the Six-Day War, Israeli authorities extended the terms of the Palestinian council members indefinitely. On May 2, voting would be held for councils in Ramallah, Bethlehem and Hebron.
- A subspecies of ocelot (Leopardus pardalis albescens), found in Mexico, Arizona and Texas, was placed on the United States Endangered Species List.
- Barbara Jordan was elected president pro tempore of the Texas State Senate, making her the first black woman to preside over a legislative body. As third in line for succession, she served as acting governor on June 10, 1972, when the Governor and Lieutenant Governor were out of the state.
- Northern Ireland's Parliament, the Stormont, met for the very last time. The assembly was dissolved when Britain introduced direct rule.
- Chong Hong Jin, South Korea's deputy director of intelligence, secretly traveled to North Korea to arrange for closer ties between the two enemy nations.

== March 29, 1972 (Wednesday) ==
- For the first time since 1966, authorities in East Germany opened the Berlin Wall for an eight-day period in order to allow visitors from West Germany during the Easter holidays, and tens of thousands of Westerners received permission to travel to East Berlin. For the first time since 1952, the Communist government permitted visitors to go beyond the capital and into the countryside as well. The visits were permitted until April 5.
- After the first seven states had ratified the proposed Equal Rights Amendment, the ERA was rejected by Oklahoma. The vote in the state's House of Representatives was 52–36, seven short of the necessary 2/3 majority. The "anti-ERA movement", led by Phyllis Schlafly, began receiving support in other states.
- The Convention on International Liability for Damage Caused by Space Objects was signed, and took effect on September 1.
- Born:
  - Priti Patel, British Home Secretary since 2019; in London.
  - Rui Costa, Portuguese soccer football midfielder with 94 appearances for the national team, later the President of Sports Lisboa e Benfica; in Amadora, Lisbon metropolitan area.
- Died: J. Arthur Rank, 83, British film producer

== March 30, 1972 (Thursday) ==
- North Vietnam launched the Nguyen Hue Offensive (referred to in the United States as the Easter Offensive), with 30,000 troops and 200 armored vehicles invading South Vietnam, with the objective of capturing the Quang Tri province. With American air support, the South Vietnamese army drove out the invaders. By the time the offensive ended in October, more than 40,000 soldiers from the North, and 10,000 from the South, had been killed.
- Born: Karel Poborsky, Czech Republic footballer, in Třeboň, Czechoslovakia
- Died: Gabriel Heatter, 81, American newscaster

== March 31, 1972 (Friday) ==
- A team of investigators from the Flamingo Park Zoo in Scarborough found a mysterious carcass floating in Scotland's Loch Ness, while searching for proof of the existence of the legendary Loch Ness Monster, and loaded it into their truck. They were stopped by Fife police under a 1933 law prohibiting the removal of "unidentified creatures" from the Loch, and the incident made headlines worldwide. An examination determined that the body was that of an elephant seal, which had died the week before at Flamingo Park. John Shields, a Zoo employee, had intended only to play a joke on his colleagues, and hadn't counted on police or press attention.
- The Masjid-e-Aqsa, the largest house of worship for Ahmadiyya Muslim Community, was dedicated in Rabwah, Pakistan.
- A Boeing B-52 Stratofortress, AF Serial No. 56-0625, departed McCoy Air Force Base, Florida on a routine training mission. Assigned to the 306th Bombardment Wing, the unarmed aircraft sustained multiple engine failures and engine fires on engines #7 and #8 shortly after takeoff. The aircraft immediately attempted to return to the base, but crashed just short of Runway 18R in a residential area of Orlando, Florida, approximately 1 mile north of McCoy AFB, destroying or damaging eight homes. The flight crew of 7 airmen and 1 civilian on the ground were killed.
- Died: Meena Kumari, 40, Indian actress and Bollywood legend
