= April 1927 =

Month of 1927

<<	April 1927					>>
Su	Mo	Tu	We	Th	Fr	Sa
					1	2
3	4	5	6	7	8	9
10	11	12	13	14	15	16
17	18	19	20	21	22	23
24	25	26	27	28	29	30

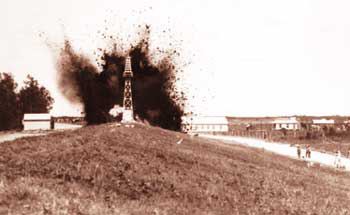
April 29, 1927: Government dynamites floodwall in Louisiana unnecessarily to protect New Orleans from the Mississippi River's greatest flood, inundates larger area

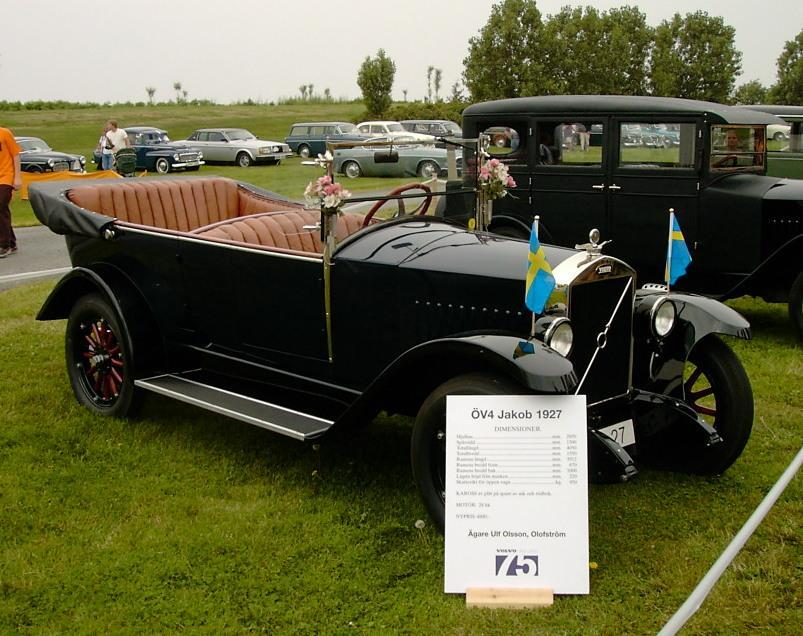
April 14, 1927: Volvo produces its first autos, the Volvo ÖV 4 Jakob series

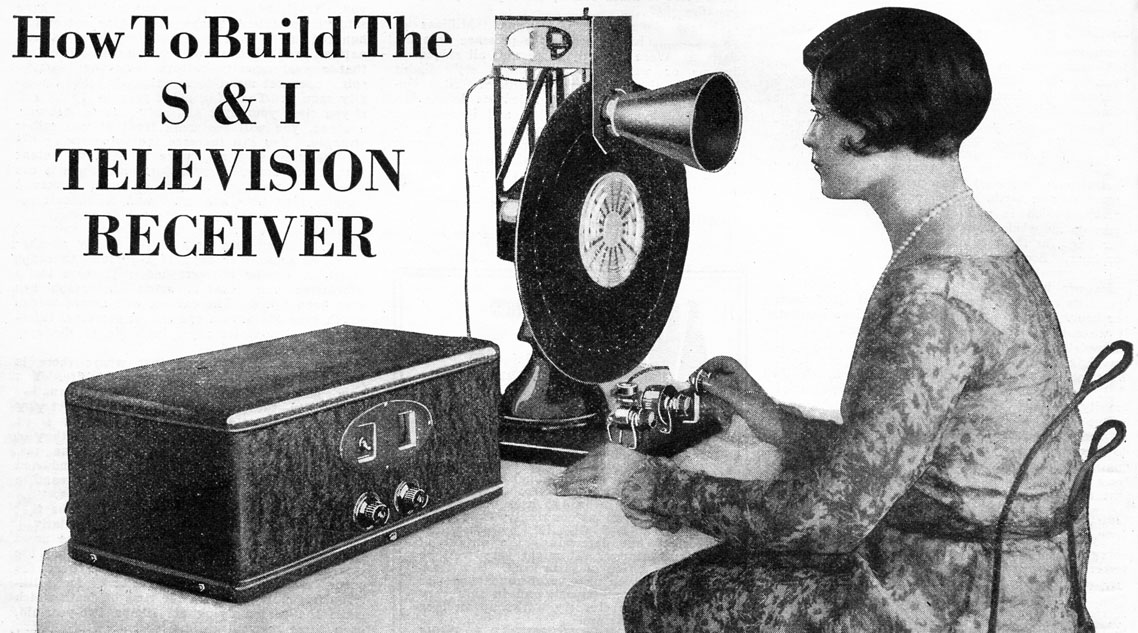
April 7, 1927: Bell Telephone demonstrates new "television"

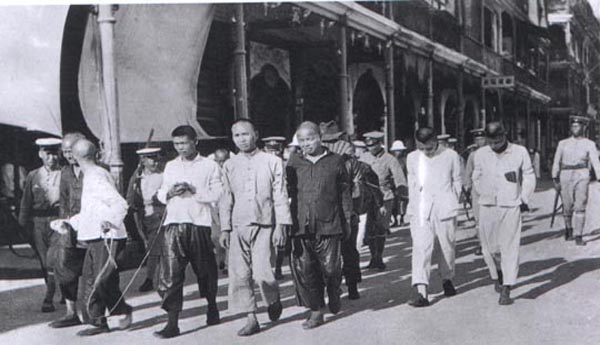
April 12, 1927: Thousands of Communists arrested and executed in surprise move by Chiang Kai-shek

The following events occurred in April 1927:

== April 1, 1927 (Friday) ==
- The Bureau of Prohibition was founded as part of the United States Department of the Treasury.
- Born: Ferenc Puskás, Hungarian footballer with 85 caps for the Hungary national team and 4 caps for the Spain national team; as Ferenc Purczeld in Budapest (d.2006)

== April 2, 1927 (Saturday) ==
- The United Kingdom announced that it was increasing its troop strength in China, from 17,000 to 22,000 men (aftermath of Nanking incident in March).
- A "fire following a storm of great intensity" destroyed the town of Körösmezö, Czechoslovakia (now Yasinia, Ukraine)
- Born:
  - Ferenc Puskás, soccer football star who played in Hungary 1943–1956 and for Real Madrid 1958–1966, and scored 84 goals in international matches; in Budapest (d. 2006)
  - Kenneth Tynan, English theatre critic; in Birmingham (d. 1980)

== April 3, 1927 (Sunday) ==
- Dr. B. R. Ambedkar, champion of the Dalit or "untouchable caste", founded the weekly newspaper Bahiskrit Bharat.
- Born: Wesley A. Brown, who in 1949 would become the first African-American to graduate from the U.S. Naval Academy; in Baltimore (d. 2012)

== April 4, 1927 (Monday) ==
- Colonial Air Transport inaugurated the first regularly scheduled airline service in America, carrying six passengers on a flight that departed Boston at 6:15 pm and landed near New York City (at Hadley Field, New Jersey), at 9:00 pm. The first ticket was sold to Mrs. Gardiner Fiske for 25 dollars.
- The Urdu language daily newspaper, Inqilab, described as a periodical that "changed the course of Muslim politics... of the entire Indo-Pakistan subcontinent" was founded by Ghulam Rasul Mehr and Abdul Majid Salik. The paper, which lasted until 1949, two years after Pakistan attained independence.
- The Victor Talking Machine Company introduced "the automatic orthophonic Victrola", the first phonograph that could be loaded with multiple (up to 12) records and then play them in sequence.
- Born: Joe Orlando, Italian-born American comic book artist; in Bari (d. 1998)
- Died: Vincent Drucci, 27, American gangster nicknamed "the Schemer", and leader of the North Side Gang. Drucci was shot while trying to wrest a gun from Chicago police detective Dan Healy. His funeral was attended by 1,000 mourners.

== April 5, 1927 (Tuesday) ==
- The Columbia Phonograph Company merged with United Independent Broadcasters to form Columbia Phonographic Broadcasting System (CPBS). The merger gave UIB $163,000 in working capital from which it was able to survive and to build a nationwide radio network (and later a television network) now known as CBS.
- The Royal Dutch Shell Company began a department for the research and development of chemical products.
- Benito Mussolini and Count Istavan Bethlen, on behalf of Italy and Hungary respectively, signed a Pact of Amity, Conciliation and Arbitration.

== April 6, 1927 (Wednesday) ==
- On the tenth anniversary of America's entry into World War I, a proposal for an international treaty "to outlaw war" was made by Aristide Briand, the Foreign Minister of France. The Kellogg–Briand Pact would be signed on August 27, 1928, by Briand and U.S. Secretary of State Frank B. Kellogg.
- U.S. President Calvin Coolidge vetoed a resolution, passed by the Philippine territorial legislature, calling for a plebiscite on whether the Philippines should become independent of the United States.
- An explosion at the refinery of Producers & Refiners Oil Company killed 13 employees and broke almost all of the windows in the company town of Parco, Wyoming.
- Webber College (now Webber International University) was founded by Roger and Grace Babson (who also founded Babson College) in Babson Park, Florida. One of the nation's first schools of business for women, it was the first private, not-for-profit college chartered under Florida's then new educational and charitable laws.
- Born: Gerry Mulligan, American jazz musician, baritone sax player; in Queens, New York City (d. 1996)

== April 7, 1927 (Thursday) ==
- At 3:25 in the afternoon, the Bell Telephone Company made the first successful demonstration of long distance mechanical television transmission, transmitting a 30 line image at the rate of 10 images per second with the aid of a system using the rotating Nipkow disc. Herbert Hoover (at that time the U.S. Secretary of Commerce) appeared before a camera in Washington, and as he spoke over a loudspeaker by telephone to AT & T President Walter S. Gifford, Hoover could be observed on a 2 by 3-foot (0.91 m) television screen by an audience in New York. Hoover told the group, "Human genius has now destroyed the impediment of distance, in a new respect, and in a manner hitherto unknown." The breakthrough in the invention of a completely electronic television system would take place five months later on September 7. Hoover's speech was followed by the first American television entertainment, a performance (from a studio in Whippany, New Jersey) by vaudeville comedian "A. Dolan", who appeared as an Irishman and then donned blackface for a minstrel show act.
- The epic French film Napoléon directed by Abel Gance and starring Albert Dieudonné premiered at the Palais Garnier in Paris.

== April 8, 1927 (Friday) ==
- The beam wireless service was inaugurated between Sydney and London by Amalgamated Wireless Company, allowing messages to be sent at the speed of light at the unprecedented distance of more than 10,000 miles (16,000 km). Using shortwave radio, messages could be sent by telegraph between the two locations.

== April 9, 1927 (Saturday) ==
- Li Dazhao, co-founder of the Chinese Communist Party, was arrested in Beijing after Chinese troops invaded the embassy of the Soviet Union. Li was charged with espionage and convicted and executed less than three weeks later.
- Sacco and Vanzetti case: Ferdinando Sacco and Bartolomeo Vanzetti were sentenced to death by Judge Webster Thayer after a controversial conviction for murder. The two men were executed on August 23.
- Led by Nat Holman, the Brooklyn Celtics won the U.S. professional basketball championship, defeating the Cleveland Rosenblums, 35–32, for a three-game sweep of the American Basketball League series.
- The SS Carl D. Bradley was launched onto Lake Erie at Lorain, Ohio. At 639 feet (195 m), she was the largest vessel to sail on the U.S. Great Lakes at that time in history. The ship would sink in Lake Michigan on November 18, 1958. All but two of her crew of 35, most of whom were from the tiny northern Michigan town of Rogers City, would perish.

== April 10, 1927 (Sunday) ==
- Ballet Mécanique, composed by George Antheil, was given its American premiere at Carnegie Hall, and booed and hissed by the crowd. Combining classical music with the sounds of machinery (including factory whistles, elevated trains, canning machinery, and airplanes), but no dancers, the ballet had debuted in Paris on June 19, 1926, and would not be performed again for more than sixty years.
- Born: Marshall Warren Nirenberg, American geneticist and 1968 Nobel Prize laureate; in New York City (d. 2010)

== April 11, 1927 (Monday) ==
- The United Kingdom of Great Britain and Ireland officially ceased to exist at the end of the day, as the Royal and Parliamentary Titles Act 1927 took effect at midnight. In an acknowledgment of the separate Irish Free State, the nation was renamed the United Kingdom of Great Britain and Northern Ireland.

== April 12, 1927 (Tuesday) ==
- The Shanghai Massacre that would ultimately claim the lives of 4,000 leftists, began a few weeks after Chiang Kai-shek's Kuomintang Army had taken control of Shanghai with the aid of Communist workers in the city. Chiang turned against his allies and gave the order for the massacre of members of the party and its sympathizers. At 3:00 in the morning, gangleader Du Yuesheng began attacks at the Zhabei District. More than 4,000 leftists were killed in Shanghai, and hundreds more elsewhere. Communist leader Zhou Enlai, who would later become the Prime Minister of the People's Republic of China when Chiang's forces were driven out in 1949, was able to escape from the city.
- The United Kingdom of Great Britain and Northern Ireland came into being with the renaming of the Kingdom.
- At 8:30 in the evening, a tornado destroyed the town of Rocksprings, Texas.

== April 13, 1927 (Wednesday) ==
- The Ottawa Senators beat the Boston Bruins, 3–1, to win ice hockey's Stanley Cup.

== April 14, 1927 (Thursday) ==
- The first Volvo automobile, the 4-cylinder Volvo ÖV 4 "Jakob", was produced at a factory in Gothenburg in Sweden.
- A 7.4 magnitude earthquake at Argentina's Mendoza Province killed more than 25 people.
- Born: Alan MacDiarmid, New Zealand chemist and 2000 Nobel Prize laureate; in Masterton (d. 2007)

== April 15, 1927 (Friday) ==
- The Great Mississippi Flood of 1927 had begun weeks earlier but this day saw the largest recorded rainfall in American history spreading over a vast area, tremendously increasing what had already been the greatest flood in recorded history. In New Orleans, a record was set with 14.96 inches (380 mm) of rain in 18 hours.
- Thomas Townsend Brown applied for a patent for "A Method of Producing Force or Motion", that used high voltage in capacitors to produce a propulsive force that he thought was anti-gravity. British patent #300,311 was issued in 1928. Brown would later name this force the Biefeld-Brown effect.
- Born:
  - Robert Mills, American quantum physicist and co-creator of the Yang–Mills theory; in Englewood, New Jersey (d. 1999)
  - Albert Goldman, American author of controversial biographies of Elvis Presley and John Lennon; in Dormont, Pennsylvania (d.1994)
- Died: Gaston Leroux, 58, French novelist and mystery writer best known for his 1910 novel The Phantom of the Opera

== April 16, 1927 (Saturday) ==
- The first break in the flood controlling levee system along the Mississippi River took place at Dorena, Missouri, and other levees soon followed. Eventually, 27,000 square miles (70,000 km^{2}) of land in seven states would be underwater, 130,000 homes would be destroyed, and a minimum of 246 people— some estimates place the death toll at well over 1,000— would be dead.
- Four well-known aviators (Richard E. Byrd, Anthony Fokker, Floyd Bennett, and George O. Norville) were injured in a crash, during the first test-flight, of Admiral Byrd's plane America, which they had intended to use in the first non-stop airplane flight between New York and Paris. The Orteig Prize would be won the following month by Charles Lindbergh.
- Born:
  - Joseph Ratzinger, the future Pope Benedict XVI, was born at 8:30 am in Marktl, Germany, on the day before Easter (Holy Saturday). The future pontiff was baptized four hours later. (d. 2022)
  - Edie Adams, American actress; as Edith Enke in Kingston, Pennsylvania (d. 2008)

== April 17, 1927 (Sunday) ==
- Japan's Prime Minister Wakatsuki Reijirō and his cabinet resigned, and were succeeded by General Tanaka Giichi, leader of the Rikken Seiyūkai Party.
- Yugoslavia's Prime Minister Nikola Uzunović resigned and was replaced by Velimir Vukićević.

== April 18, 1927 (Monday) ==
- Armed robbers near Limón in Mexico's Jalisco state, stopped a passenger train that was en route from Guadalajara to Mexico City, shot anyone who resisted, and then set fire to the wooden cars. More than 150 people died in the holdup.
- Chiang Kai-shek declared himself to be Chairman of the National Government Committee President of China, with a capital at Nanjing. The other government continued to function at Beijing.
- Born:
  - Samuel P. Huntington, American political scientist and author of Clash of Civilizations; in New York City (d. 2008)
  - Tadeusz Mazowiecki, prime minister of Poland 1989–1990, and the first non-Communist to hold the post after World War II; in Płock (d. 2013)

== April 19, 1927 (Tuesday) ==
- The 31st Boston Marathon, and the first to use the internationally recognized marathon distance of 26 miles and 385 yards (42.195 kilometers) was run, with Clarence DeMar finishing in 2 hours, 25 minutes and 40 seconds.
- Convicted on obscenity charges, Mae West began serving a nine-day jail sentence, at the Jefferson Market Prison in New York City.
- The Cecil B. DeMille-directed epic film The King of Kings was released.
- Died: Rosa Sucher, 78, German opera singer

== April 20, 1927 (Wednesday) ==
- General Tanaka Giichi, leader of the Rikken Seiyūkai Party, became the new Prime Minister of Japan.
- Born:
  - Phil Hill, American race car driver and winner of 1961 Formula One championship; in Miami (d. 2008)
  - K. Alex Müller, Swiss physicist and 1987 Nobel Prize laureate; in Basel (d. 2023)

== April 21, 1927 (Thursday) ==
- The worst failure of the flood control system along the Mississippi River happened at Mounds Landing, near Scott, Mississippi, as the pressure of floodwaters broke the levee and inundated thousands of square miles of land.
- Born:
  - George E. Shipley, U.S. Congressman (D-Illinois) 1959-1979; in Olney, Illinois (d. 2003)
  - Robert Brustein, American theatre critic and playwright; in New York City (d. 2023)

== April 22, 1927 (Friday) ==
- In the biggest disaster relief effort to that time, U.S. President Calvin Coolidge announced the formation of a committee to aid flood victims through the American Red Cross. "The Government is giving such aid as lies within its power," Coolidge stated, supplying boats and tents for refugees, but added that "the burden of caring for the homeless" was that of the Red Cross. "For so great a task additional funds must be obtained immediately," Coolidge urged the public to make "generous contributions" to the Red Cross. The government spent $10 million on relief, while the Red Cross collected $17.5 million in cash and $6 million in supplies to take care of 600,000 flood victims.
- Died: Charles Merrill Hough, 68, American federal district court judge

== April 23, 1927 (Saturday) ==
- Twenty-one workers were burned to death and more than one hundred were injured in an explosion and fire that destroyed the auto body plant of Briggs Manufacturing Company in Detroit. A subsequent investigation concluded that the blast had been caused by a spark that ignited nitrocellulose fumes in the process of lacquering car bodies.
- Cardiff City won the FA Cup after beating Arsenal 1–0 at Wembley Stadium before a crowd of 91,206. The winning goal was scored accidentally when Arsenal's goalie knocked the ball into the net while trying to gather it in. The 52nd championship game was the first FA Cup final to be broadcast on the radio, and the only one to be won by a non-English team.
- Born: Walter J. Karplus, Austrian-born American computer science pioneer; in Vienna (d. 2001)

== April 24, 1927 (Sunday) ==
- Members of the Chinese Communist Party, who had survived the April 12 massacre, met at Wuhan and re-elected Chen Duxiu (Ch'en Tu-hsiu) as the Party's Secretary General.

== April 25, 1927 (Monday) ==
- The design was chosen for the flag of Alaska as part of a contest among the territory's schoolchildren. Thirteen-year-old orphan Benny Benson, who based his design on the North Star and the Big Dipper (later set against a dark blue field) won a $1,000 prize and a trip to Paris.
- The musical Hit the Deck premiered at the Belasco Theater, introducing Vincent Youmans's hit song "Sometimes I'm Happy".
- Died: Earle Williams, 46, American silent film actor and leading man for Vitagraph Studios; from bronchial pneumonia

== April 26, 1927 (Tuesday) ==
- Lieutenant Commanders Noel Davis and Stanton H. Wooster, who were aspiring to win the Orteig Prize by becoming the first persons to fly an airplane from New York to Paris, were killed in a test flight of their Keystone Pathfinder monoplane. Unable to climb with its heavy fuel load, the American Legion crashed into trees while attempting a takeoff from Virginia's Langley Field.

== April 27, 1927 (Wednesday) ==
- The Carabineros, national police force of Chile, were created by decree of President Carlos Ibáñez del Campo.
- Born: Coretta Scott King, American civil rights leader following her marriage in 1953 to Martin Luther King Jr.; as Coretta Scott in Marion, Alabama (d. 2006)
- Died: Albert J. Beveridge, 64, U.S. Senator for Indiana from 1899 to 1911

== April 28, 1927 (Thursday) ==
- In Aba, Japan, three-year-old Chyu Kuryama was struck by a small meteorite, which was later displayed in a museum. Although she was hit in the head, she was not seriously injured. The first reported instance in the United States of a person being hit by a meteorite would be on November 30, 1954, when Mrs. E. Hulitt Hodges of Sylacuga, Alabama, would be hit by an 8-pound stone.
- The airplane Spirit of St. Louis, piloted by Charles Lindbergh, was flown for the first time, shortly after he had overseen its manufacture in accordance with his specifications. Lindbergh tested the single engine monoplane at the Dutch Flats, near San Diego. On May 20, he would use the craft in an attempt to become the first person to fly an airplane from New York to Paris.
- Died: Li Dazhao, 39, co-founder of the Chinese Communist Party, was hanged along with 19 other persons arrested at the Soviet Embassy in Beijing.

== April 29, 1927 (Friday) ==
- Two parishes in Louisiana were deliberately flooded in order to protect New Orleans, as a dynamite charge blasted the levee at Caernarvon. With the objective of relieving pressure from the Mississippi River on the larger city's floodwalls, Governor Oramel H. Simpson obtained federal approval to evacuate residents, mostly African-American farm families, of the parishes of St. Bernard and Plaquemines and then to destroy the floodwall.
- Born: Lois Florreich, American female baseball pitcher and AAGPBL star; in Webster Groves, Missouri; in 1949, she had an ERA of 0.67 in 1949 for the Rockford Peaches, and a career ERA of 1.40 (d. 1991)

== April 30, 1927 (Saturday) ==
- An explosion killed 111 coal miners at the Federal No. 3 Coal Mine of New England Fuel and Transportation Company at Everettville, West Virginia.
- Mary Pickford and Douglas Fairbanks, Sr. became the first film stars to put their handprints in cement at Grauman's Chinese Theatre.
- The Federal Institute for Women, the first U.S. government prison for women convicted of violations of federal law, was opened at Alderson, West Virginia, for any woman sentenced to a year or more in prison. Three women from Vermont were the first inmates.
- The first sound newsreel was introduced by Fox Movietone News, prior to the showing of a feature film at the Roxy Theater in New York City. The first report, lasting four minutes, showed the marching of cadets at the U.S. Military Academy.
