= February 1972 =

Month of 1972

<<	February 1972					>>
Su	Mo	Tu	We	Th	Fr	Sa
		1	2	3	4	5
6	7	8	9	10	11	12
13	14	15	16	17	18	19
20	21	22	23	24	25	26
27	28	29

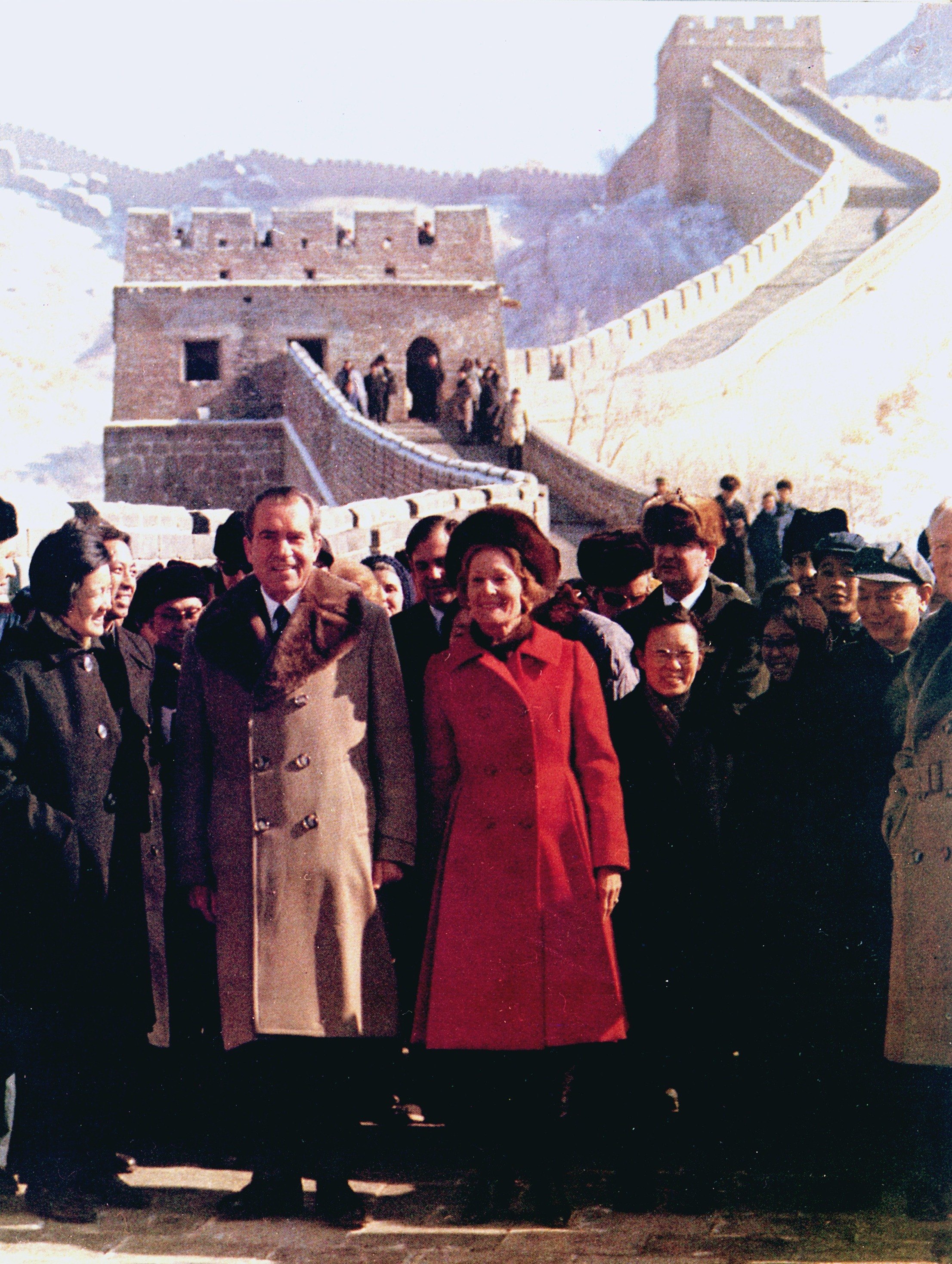
February 21, 1972: Richard M. Nixon becomes first U.S. president to visit Communist China

The following events occurred in February 1972:

== February 1, 1972 (Tuesday) ==
- Four days after Nazi hunter Beate Klarsfeld had found that Klaus Barbie was living in Bolivia (as "Klaus Altmann"), the French government requested his extradition. Barbie was not brought to justice until 1983.
- In a private White House meeting between Billy Graham and U.S. President Richard Nixon, Graham voiced his opinion that the Jewish "stranglehold" on the media "has got to be broken". Graham would eventually apologize for his remarks, which were widely condemned as antisemitic, after the tape of the conversation was released by the National Archives in 2002.
- Democrat Edwin Edwards was elected to the first of four terms as Governor of Louisiana, defeating Republican David C. Treen in the general election by a margin of 57-43 percent.

== February 2, 1972 (Wednesday) ==
- Following the funerals in Derry of 13 of the people killed by British paratroopers in Northern Ireland on "Bloody Sunday", a mob, estimated at 25,000, poured into Dublin's Merrion Square and burned down the four story British embassy in Ireland. Due to threats and attacks earlier in the week, all important records had been removed and the building was unoccupied.
- Born: Naheed Nenshi, the first Muslim mayor of a large North American city, known for serving as the Mayor of Calgary from 2010 to 2021; in Toronto
- Died:
  - Genaro Vázquez, 40, Mexican guerilla leader died after injuries sustained in a car wreck.
  - Natalie Barney, 95, lesbian pioneer

== February 3, 1972 (Thursday) ==
- The 1972 Winter Olympics opened in Sapporo, Japan, with 1,006 athletes from 35 nations marching in the opening ceremony at Makomanai Stadium. Schoolboy Hideki Takada lit the Olympic flame.
- A blizzard began in Iran that would kill more than 4,000 people over a six-day period. As much of 26 feet (7.9 m) of snow fell on top of existing drifts in western Iran and into the Soviet Union's Azerbaijani SSR, and killed people in more than 200 Iranian villages. The snow finally abated on February 9.
- The United States Federal Communications Commission (FCC) issued new rules for cable television in the United States. American systems had to carry at least 20 channels (including public-access television). The reform opened the door for new cable television networks.
- Born: Michael Kovrig, Canadian diplomat who was held prisoner in China from 2018 to 2021; in Toronto

== February 4, 1972 (Friday) ==
- Kenneth Kaunda, the President of Zambia, moved to turn the African democracy into a one-party state after the new United Progressive Party (Zambia) (UPP) had won a by-election in December. Simon Kapwepwe, who had been Kaunda's Vice-President until founding the UPP in 1971, was arrested, along with other party members. Kaunda's United National Independence Party (UNIP) then became the only legal party.
- Argentina's worst serial killer, Carlos Robledo Puch, was captured after committing 11 murders in less than a year.
- Two middle school students, aged 12 and 13, became the first of at least seven victims of the Santa Rosa hitchhiker murders in and around the town of Santa Rosa, California. The two had last been seen hitchhiking home from an ice skating rink, and their bodies would not be discovered until December 28. The last of the killings happened on December 22, 1973; the perpetrator was never caught.
- Born: Giovanni Silva de Oliveira, Brazilian footballer with 18 caps for the national team; in Abaetetuba

== February 5, 1972 (Saturday) ==
- Jean-Bédel Bokassa, the President of the Central African Republic since 1966, was proclaimed "President for Life". In 1976, he would proclaim himself Emperor, ruling until his overthrow in 1979.
- Died: Marianne Moore, 84, American poet

== February 6, 1972 (Sunday) ==
- Two weeks before his historic visit to the People's Republic of China, President Nixon secretly (and unsuccessfully) asked the Chinese government to arrange a meeting there with North Vietnam's peace negotiator, Lê Đức Thọ.
- Died: Llewellyn Thompson, U.S. ambassador to the USSR 1957 to 1962 and 1967 to 1969

== February 7, 1972 (Monday) ==
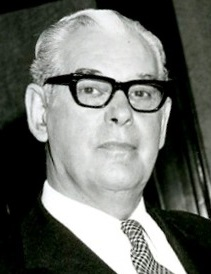
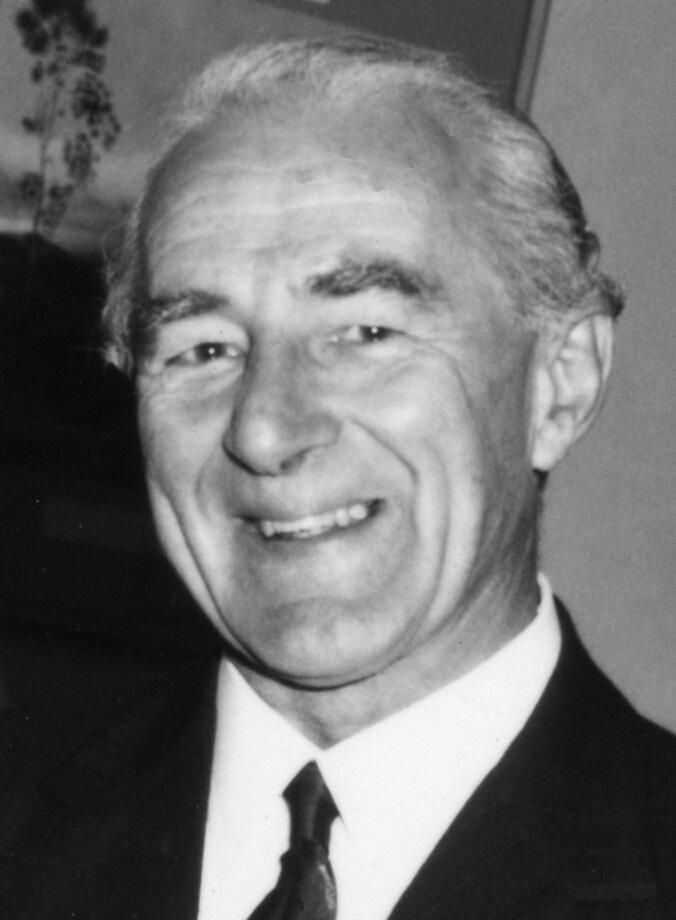
Keith Holyoake and Jack Marshall
- Keith Holyoake resigned as Prime Minister of New Zealand after more than 11 years. He was replaced by the Deputy Prime Minister, Jack Marshall, who would lead the government until elections held on November 25.
- The Federal Election Campaign Act was signed into law by U.S. President Nixon, taking effect on April 7.

== February 8, 1972 (Tuesday) ==
- A state of emergency was declared throughout the United Kingdom by Prime Minister Edward Heath as the coal miners' strike continued, and mined coal dwindled.
- The Baseball Hall of Fame announced the first of its enshrinees to have spent their entire career in baseball's Negro leagues as a special committee selected Josh Gibson and Buck Leonard, for the same group as Sandy Koufax and Yogi Berra.
- National Hockey League star Bruce Gamble suffered a heart attack after tending goal for the Philadelphia Flyers in a 3–1 victory over the Vancouver Canucks, and was hospitalized the next day as the team traveled from Vancouver to Oakland, bringing an end to his NHL career. Gamble would die of a heart attack in 1982, hours after practicing with another team. Some accounts state, erroneously, that Gamble had collapsed in the middle of the Vancouver game, or that he died while playing hockey.
- After four months, a strike by the 13,000 members of the International Longshore and Warehouse Union, which mostly served West Coast ports, was settled. The strike had been interrupted by a Taft–Hartley Act injunction that had expired earlier in the month.
- Born:
  - Whitney Gaskell, American novelist; in Syracuse, New York .
  - Big Show (ring name for Paul Wight), American professional wrestler; in Aiken, South Carolina.

== February 9, 1972 (Wednesday) ==
- The Iran blizzard ended after seven days, during which as much as 26 feet (7.9 m) of snow buried villages in northwestern, central and southern Iran. An estimated 4,000 people were killed, particularly in the area around Ardakan.
- Born: Crispin Freeman, American voice actor; in Chicago
- Died: Chico Ruiz, 33, Cuban-born American major league baseball player, was killed in a car accident a month after having become a U.S. citizen.

== February 10, 1972 (Thursday) ==
Formerly "Kinney Services, Inc."

- Kinney Services, Inc., a conglomerate which had purchased the Warner Bros. studio in 1969, completed reorganization as shareholders approved its disincorporation in New York and its reincorporation in Delaware, with the new name of Warner Communications, Inc. The company, which now owns Turner Broadcasting, HBO, Cinemax, DC Comics, New Line Cinema, and part of TheCW television network, is now known as Warner Bros. Discovery.
- In Calama, Chile, where it was said that no rain had fallen "for more than 400 years", rain fell in a downpour and caused mudslides.
- David Bowie opened his concert tour with his new alter ego of "Ziggy Stardust", starting at the Toby Jug Pub in Tolworth.
- American and South Vietnamese forces completed a 24-hour period of bombing strikes against North Vietnam, with almost 400 bombing strikes carried out in some of the heaviest raids of the Vietnam War.
- Ras Al Khaimah joined the United Arab Emirates (UAE) as its sixth emirate.

== February 11, 1972 (Friday) ==
- As the nationwide strike of British coal miners continued, Secretary for Trade and Industry John Davies told the House of Commons that the government was ordering a massive shutdown of Britain's industry. Davies added that "Many, many people—perhaps millions—will be laid off."
- President Georges Pompidou of France and Chancellor Willy Brandt of West Germany jointly announced in Paris that the two nations had agreed to form an economic and monetary union.
- Time magazine concluded that The Autobiography of Howard Hughes, written by Hughes "with Clifford Irving" was a hoax, and that it had been plagiarized.
- The Nassau Coliseum was opened in Uniondale, New York, on Long Island, with the first event being an American Basketball Association (ABA) game. The New York Nets beat the visiting Pittsburgh Condors, 129–121, as Rick Barry scored 45 points.
- The Convention for the Conservation of Antarctic Seals was signed in London.
- Born:
  - Kelly Slater, American professional surfer with 11 championships in the World Surf League; in Cocoa Beach, Florida
  - Steve McManaman, British footballer with 37 caps for the England national team; in Kirkdale, Liverpool

== February 12, 1972 (Saturday) ==
- Time won the right to publish excerpts from Clifford Irving's "autobiography" of Howard Hughes, a day after cancelling declaring that it was a hoax. Time had discovered also that much of the work had been plagiarized from author James Phelan.
- The first delegates to the 1972 Democratic National Convention were selected, with 1,508 needed to win. A caucus in Arizona awarded nine delegates to Edmund Muskie, six each to John V. Lindsay and George S. McGovern, and four uncommitted.

== February 13, 1972 (Sunday) ==
- The 1972 Winter Olympics closed in Sapporo. The Soviet Union had the most medals (16) and most gold medals (8), followed by East Germany, Switzerland, the Netherlands, and the United States.
- The Tony Award-winning musical 1776 closed after 1,217 performances on Broadway.

== February 14, 1972 (Monday) ==
- A week before his visit to Beijing, President Nixon removed restrictions on American exports to the People's Republic of China, which had been in place for more than 20 years.
- The animated TV special The Lorax by Dr. Seuss first aired on CBS.
- Born:
  - Drew Bledsoe, American pro football quarterback; in Ellensburg, Washington
  - Rob Thomas, American singer, lead singer of Matchbox Twenty; in Landstuhl, West Germany, near Ramstein Air Base

== February 15, 1972 (Tuesday) ==
- U.S. Patent No. 3,641,591 was granted to inventor Willem J. Kolff for the first artificial heart.
- José María Velasco Ibarra was overthrown as President of Ecuador. Velasco, who had been president on four other occasions, and was facing re-election, prepared to address the nation after learning that a coup d'état was planned. Upon arriving at the Channel 10 studios in Guayaquil, he was arrested, placed on an Ecuadorian Air Force plane, and flown to Panama. Velasco was replaced by General Guillermo Rodríguez Lara, who cancelled the election.
- The Oslo Convention, officially the Convention for the Prevention of Marine Pollution by Dumping from Ships and Aircraft, was signed in the Norwegian capital by Denmark, France, Iceland, Norway, Portugal, Spain, and Sweden, to take effect April 7, 1974.
- On the same day, what was later called the Cod Wars began when Iceland announced that it was terminating prior fishing treaties with the United Kingdom and West Germany, and that, effective September 1, it would not permit fishing within 50 nautical miles (57.5 miles or 92.6 km) of its coastline.
- The United States granted copyright protection, for the first time, to sound recordings. Previously, only the written musical and lyrical compositions could be protected from reproduction.
- Ibrahim Hoti returned to Kosovo from Iraq, beginning the chain of events leading to a smallpox epidemic in Yugoslavia.
- Using the technology that would be introduced in 1980 for closed captioning, the ABC television network and the National Bureau of Standards demonstrated the results to students at Gallaudet College (the most prestigious U.S. college for deaf and hearing-impaired students, now Gallaudet University). The closed captioning, visible with decoding equipment, was embedded within the television signal for the ABC police drama The Mod Squad.
- Born: Jaromír Jágr, Czech hockey player and holder of the National Hockey League record for most career game-winning goals (with 135); in Kladno, Czechoslovakia
- Died: Edgar Snow, 66, author of Red Star Over China

== February 16, 1972 (Wednesday) ==
- The Republic of the Maldives hosted tourists for the first time since its independence in 1965, as 22 Italian visitors arrived at an airstrip on Hulhulé Island, and were taken to accommodations at three guest houses in Malé. In 2009, there were more than 600,000 visitors annually to resorts throughout the Maldive Islands
- Born:
  - Jerome Bettis, American NFL running back and inductee to the Pro Football Hall of Fame; in Detroit.
  - Vicki Butler-Henderson, British racing driver, journalist (known for Auto Express and What Car?), and TV presenter (known for Fifth Gear and Top Gear); in Essex
  - Sarah Clarke, American actress; in St. Louis
  - Guy Mowbray, British sports commentator; in York, Yorkshire

== February 17, 1972 (Thursday) ==
- British Prime Minister Edward Heath narrowly won a vote in the House of Commons on whether to ratify the treaty for the United Kingdom to join the European Community. Heath turned the matter into a vote of confidence by pledging to resign and to call new elections in the midst of a crisis, saying that "If the House will not agree ... my colleagues and I are unanimous that in these circumstances, this Parliament could not sensibly continue." By a margin of only eight votes (309–301), the bill passed.
- The Volkswagen Beetle broke the record for the most popular automobile in history, as the 15,007,034th Beetle was produced. Between 1908 and May 26, 1927, a total of 15,007,033 Model Ts had been produced.
- Born:
  - Billie Joe Armstrong, American musician, lead singer of Green Day; in Oakland, California
  - Taylor Hawkins, American drummer (Foo Fighters); in Fort Worth, Texas (d. 2022)
  - Lars-Göran Petrov, Macedonian-Swedish metal singer (Entombed) (d. 2021)

== February 18, 1972 (Friday) ==
- In a 6–1 decision in the case of People v. Anderson (6 Cal.3d 628), California's Supreme Court declared that the death penalty law violated the State Constitution. The Court commuted the death sentences, of 102 men and five women on death row, to life imprisonment.

== February 19, 1972 (Saturday) ==
- Radio Hanoi broadcast a live press conference to display five newly captured American prisoners of war.
- The TV show All in the Family first aired what became its most famous episode, which ended with black musician Sammy Davis Jr. giving a kiss on the cheek to America's most popular bigot, Archie Bunker.
- The Asama-Sansō incident, which would soon be watched on live television across Japan, began when five members of the Japanese Red Army began a standoff in a mountain lodge with a woman hostage.
- Died:
  - Lee Morgan, 33, American jazz trumpeter, was shot and killed at Slug's, a New York bar, after completing a concert.
  - John Grierson, 73, Scottish documentary filmmaker (b. 1898)

== February 20, 1972 (Sunday) ==
- In the United States sixty million people tuned in to watch live television coverage of President Nixon's Monday morning arrival in Communist China, starting at 9:30 pm Eastern time (0230 on February 21 UTC) and 10:30 in the morning February 21 in Beijing. The three networks (ABC, CBS and NBC) split the cost of $8,300 per hour for satellite broadcasting during the eight-day visit, and each sent eleven people on the trip.
- What one author would describe as "the best live performance" of The Dark Side of the Moon by British progressive rock band Pink Floyd took place one year before the best-selling album was released.
- Died:
  - Walter Winchell, 74, American newspaper columnist and radio commentator
  - Maria Goeppert Mayer, 65, German-born American theoretical physicist and 1963 Nobel Prize in Physics laureate for her work on describing the nuclear shell model of the atomic nucleus, died after a year of being in a coma following a heart attack.

== February 21, 1972 (Monday) ==
- At 11:30 a.m. local time (0330 UTC) in Peking (now Beijing), Richard M. Nixon became the first President of the United States to visit the People's Republic of China, ending more than 22 years of hostility between the two nations. Nixon greeted China's Prime Minister Zhou Enlai with one of the most famous handshakes in history. "When our hands met", Nixon would write later, "one era ended and another began", while Zhou told Nixon on their trip from the airport, "Your handshake came over the vastest ocean in the world – twenty-five years of no communication."

== February 22, 1972 (Tuesday) ==
- Ahmad bin Ali Al Thani, who had been the Emir of Qatar since its independence in 1971, was removed from office by unanimous vote of other members of the Al Thani family. Ahmad, who had failed even to organize a government and had used the nation's wealth to support an expensive lifestyle, was replaced by his cousin, Khalifa bin Hamad Al Thani, who ruled until 1995.
- In retaliation for the killing of 13 Irish civilians by the British army on "Bloody Sunday", the Irish Republican Army exploded a car bomb outside of a mess hall reserved for officers at the Aldershot, England, headquarters of the 16th Parachute Brigade. Seven people were killed by the IRA bomb, and none of them were soldiers. Killed in the blast were an Army chaplain and six waitresses.
- Born: Claudia Pechstein, German speed-skater, winner of five Olympic gold medals (1994, 1998, 2002 and 2006); in East Berlin

== February 23, 1972 (Wednesday) ==
- The hijacking of Lufthansa Flight 649 ended in Aden International Airport after Palestinian gunmen released their last hostages, the 14 member crew. The Boeing 747-200 had been seized en route from Delhi to Athens on February 22 by five gunmen and forced it to land in South Yemen, where all 172 passengers (including future Congressman Joseph P. Kennedy II) were freed. The release came after the government of West Germany paid a five million dollar ransom.
- After 16 months in prison, black militant Angela Davis was released on bail when a white farmer posted most of the required $102,500.
- The Environmental Protection Agency published its first regulations requiring unleaded gasoline to be made available at all gas stations.

== February 24, 1972 (Thursday) ==
- Twenty-eight men on board the Soviet nuclear submarine K-19 were killed when fires broke out in three of its compartments while the sub was submerged. The twelve survivors remained trapped inside the sub as it was towed, over the next three weeks, from the Arctic Ocean back to the Kola Peninsula.
- For the first time since the Paris Peace Talks (concerning the Vietnam War) three years earlier, the two Communist delegations walked out of a session. The groups were protesting the recent surge in bombing by the United States. The talks resumed the following week. The bombings had been in response to a North Vietnamese military build up, threatening large portions of South Vietnam.
- Born:
  - Manon Rhéaume, Canadian ice hockey player who became the first woman to play in the all-male National Hockey League, appearing in preseason games in 1992 and 1993; in Beauport, Quebec
  - Richard Chelimo, Kenyan long-distance runner who held the world record for five days in 1993 for the 10,000-meter race; in the Marakwet District (died of a brain tumor, 2001)

== February 25, 1972 (Friday) ==
- By a vote of 210,039 to 7,581 the members of the National Union of Mineworkers ended a strike that had crippled the British economy, in return for a 20 percent pay increase by the National Coal Board.

== February 26, 1972 (Saturday) ==
- The Buffalo Creek flood killed 125 people in Logan County, West Virginia, after a coal slurry impoundment dam gave way at 8:05 a.m., during heavy rains. Over the next several minutes, 132 million US gallons (500,000 cubic metres; 500 million litres) of coal waste and water in a wave over the communities in its path.
- Born: Maz Jobrani, Iranian-American comedian, actor and activist; in Tehran

== February 27, 1972 (Sunday) ==
- The Addis Ababa Agreement was signed at the palace of Ethiopia's Emperor Haile Selassie, bringing an end to the First Sudanese Civil War after more than 17 years and more than 500,000 deaths. Ezboni Mondiri Gwonza of the South Sudan Liberation Movement, and Sudan's Foreign Minister, Mansour Khalid, signed an agreement to end fighting in return for recognition by the Islamic governments of political and religious autonomy for the people living in the southern half of the nation. The agreement lasted until 1983, when fighting broke out again.
- The Shanghai Communiqué was issued jointly by President Richard M. Nixon of the United States and Prime Minister Zhou Enlai of the People's Republic of China. The two leaders agreed that normalization of relations between the U.S. and the PRC was in the interest of both nations.
- The New York Times carried on its front page the troublesome World3 forecast of a group at MIT for the century ahead, writing that began "A major computer study of world trends has concluded, as many have feared, that mankind probably faces an uncontrollable and disastrous collapse of its society within 100 years unless it moves speedily to establish a 'global equilibrium' in which growth of population and industrial output are halted." The study, soon published as The Limits to Growth, was funded by the Club of Rome.

== February 28, 1972 (Monday) ==
- Before departing the People's Republic of China following an historic visit, President Nixon of the United States signed the Shanghai Communiqué with Premier Zhou of China, setting out agreements to improve diplomatic relations and to prevent the hegemony of any nation (including the Soviet Union) over the "Asia-Pacific Region".

== February 29, 1972 (Tuesday) ==
- "We now have evidence that the settlement of the Nixon administration's biggest antitrust case was privately arranged between Atty. Gen. John Mitchell and the top lobbyist for the company involved", was the opener to Jack Anderson's syndicated column. "We have this on the word of the lobbyist herself, crusty, capable Dita Beard of the International Telephone and Telegraph Co. She acknowledged the secret deal after we obtained a highly incriminating memo, written by her, from ITT's files." The subsequent investigation by the Nixon Administration into the source of leaked information was one of seven improper activities cited by the Watergate Committee in its final report.
- Born:
  - Pedro Sánchez, Prime Minister of Spain since 2018; in Madrid
  - Antonio Sabàto Jr., Italian-born U.S. TV and film actor; in Rome
