= Radio in Turkey =

Radio enjoys numerous listeners in Turkey. There are more than 1000 radio stations in the country. (see List of radio stations in Turkey.) The first radio studio was formed in Turkey in Ankara Radio.

== History ==
The first attempts at radio broadcasting began in 1921 in Istanbul, Turkey. The first radio broadcast in Turkey began on May 6, 1927. In 1927, connection to New York City, London, Berlin, Vienna, Moscow and Tehran was established. In 1945, Turkey's first university radio, ITU Radio, was established and the first state radio, TRT, was established on May 1, 1964. Establishment of private radio stations began in the early 1990s. Internet radio began to be established in the late 1990s.

== Commercial radio ==
The first radio advertising in Turkey was in 1951. Ads were read by the announcer first. Then radio stations created a custom clock for advertising. Banks, private organizations, official and semi-official organizations issued radio ads. Faruk Sea, the first advertising company in Turkey was founded in 1956 with the name "Television Commercials". Türkan Sedefoğlu was the first woman advertiser.

== Digital radio (DAB+) trials ==
Turkey's digital radio (DAB) test transmission launched 2003 in Ankara Dikmen transmitter. In March 2008, DAB radio terminated in Turkey. DAB radio discontinued second European countries Portugal in April 2011.

In November 2015, Turkey's DAB+ relaunched in Ankara or Istanbul on MUX 1 (TRT Radyo 1, TRT FM, TRT Radyo 3, TRT Türkü ve TRT Nağme). In 2017, TRT DAB+ test transmission started in 8 radio channel. In June 2020, Istanbul Küçük Çamlıca Tower starting expected DVB-T2 or DAB+ trial broadcasting.

RTÜK's digital terrestrial television (DVB-T2) or digital radio (DAB+) frequency auction is expected at the mid-2020.

== See also ==
- List of radio stations in Turkey
- Media of Turkey
