= Mežmuiža Manor =

Manor house in Latvia

- Zemgale, Latvia
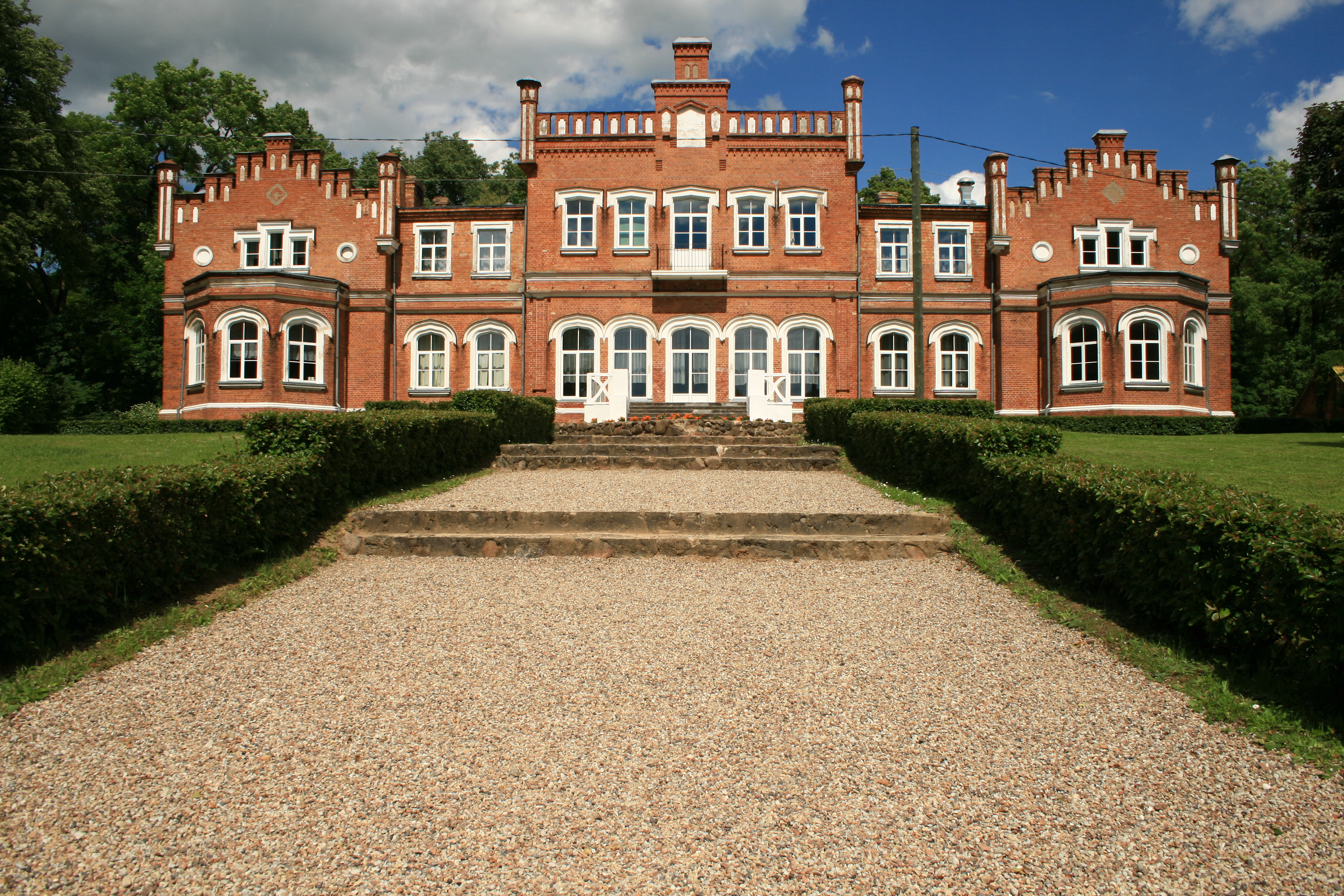

Site information
- Type: Manor

Location
- Coordinates: 56°24′18″N 23°20′2″E

Site history
- Built: Around 1850

Mežmuiža Manor, also called Augstkalne Manor, is a Neo-Gothic style manor house in Augstkalne Parish, Dobele Municipality in the Semigallia region of Latvia.

== History ==
Restored between 1992 and 1994, Mežmuiža Manor dates back to the mid 1870s. The first owners were the Lievens.

The main building is located a midst the mills, the gardeners, the maids, and the administrative building, situated a little away from the barns. The manor complex also includes a 12-hectare park with pillars where exotic species are grown, such as balm, the European silver fir, red oak, black and mountain pine. Since 1954, it has housed the Augstkalne secondary school.

== See also ==
- List of palaces and manor houses in Latvia
