= Ansis Kaupēns =

Latvian robber

- Born: Ansis Alberts Kaupēns; 2 November 1895; Platone Parish, Courland Governorate, Russian Empire
- Died: 6 May 1927 (aged 31); Vircava Parish, Latvia
- Cause of death: Execution by hanging
- Conviction: Murder
- Penalty: Death

Details
- Victims: 19
- Span of crimes: 1920–1926
- Country: Latvia
- Date apprehended: 8 June 1926

Ansis Alberts Kaupēns (2 November 1895 – 6 May 1927) was a Latvian robber; perhaps the most famous Latvian criminal of the interwar period. Kaupēns was born in 1895 and baptized in Platone Parish. In 1916 he began serving in the Imperial Russian Army, and after that for the Red Army's 9th Latvian Riflemen Regiment (with the rank of sergeant), but in 1919 or 1920, he deserted and returned to live in Latvia. He committed his first robbery on 29 January 1920 and the last on 29 May 1926. During this period, more than 30 robberies and 19 murders were supposedly committed. In the meantime, Kaupēns worked as a paper hanger in Jelgava during the day. He was even able to stop and rob a passenger train (on 27 September 1923 between Viesīte and Daudzeva), but mostly robbed on highways. Arrested on 8 June 1926 and sentenced to death, Kaupēns was executed by hanging on 6 May 1927. He was buried in Svēte Parish.

The life of Kaupēns became the basis of several books and films, such as Andris Grūtups' 2001 book Tiesāšanās kā māksla and the 2011 film Kaupēns, which was based on his crimes.
