= January 1927 =

Month of 1927

<<	January 1927					>>
Su	Mo	Tu	We	Th	Fr	Sa
						1
2	3	4	5	6	7	8
9	10	11	12	13	14	15
16	17	18	19	20	21	22
23	24	25	26	27	28	29
30	31

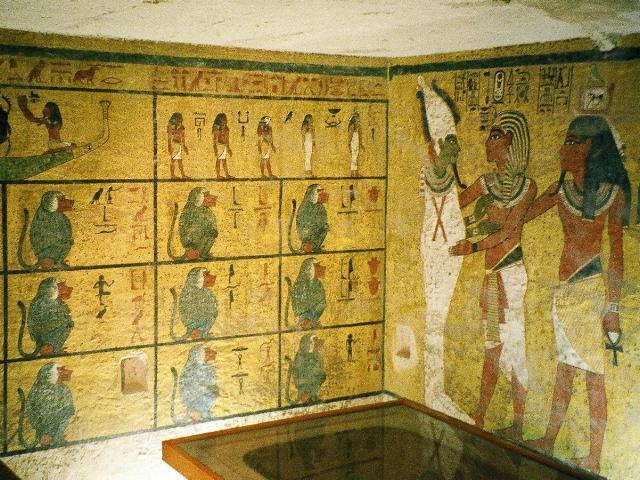
January 1, 1927: Tutankhamun's tomb opened for public viewing

January 1, 1927: BBC created

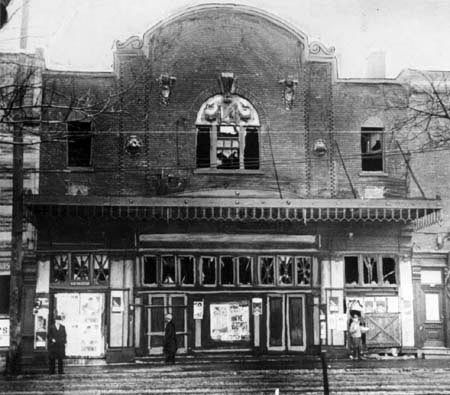
January 9, 1927: 78 children killed at Montreal cinema fire

January 27, 1927: CBS created as UIB

January 18, 1927: U.S. Food and Drug Administration established

The following events occurred in January 1927:

== January 1, 1927 (Saturday) ==
- The tomb of Tutankhamun was opened for public viewing for the first time since the Egyptian pharaoh's death in 1327 BC.
- The British Broadcasting Corporation was created by royal charter as a publicly funded company, with 773 employees. The first BBC news bulletin would be delivered at 6:30 am on January 3.
- Imperial Chemical Industries was created in Great Britain by the merger of four companies.
- Massachusetts became the first state in the U.S. to require car owners to carry liability insurance.
- The 1927 Rose Bowl matched two of the nation's unbeaten and untied college football teams, with the Stanford Indians (10–0–0) against the Alabama Crimson Tide (9–0–0). Stanford led, 7–0, until the final minute, when Alabama blocked a punt, recovered the ball on the 14, and nullified the victory with a 7–7 tie.
- Born:
  - Doak Walker, American football player (Detroit Lions 1950–55); in Dallas (d. 1998)
  - Vernon L. Smith, American economist and 2002 Nobel Prize laureate; in Wichita, Kansas

== January 2, 1927 (Sunday) ==
- The Cristero War began in villages across Mexico in the Los Altos region of the state of Jalisco. The uprising began in protest against anti-clerical laws in Mexico and the rebels called themselves "Cristeros" as fighters for so named because they fought for Christ.

== January 3, 1927 (Monday) ==
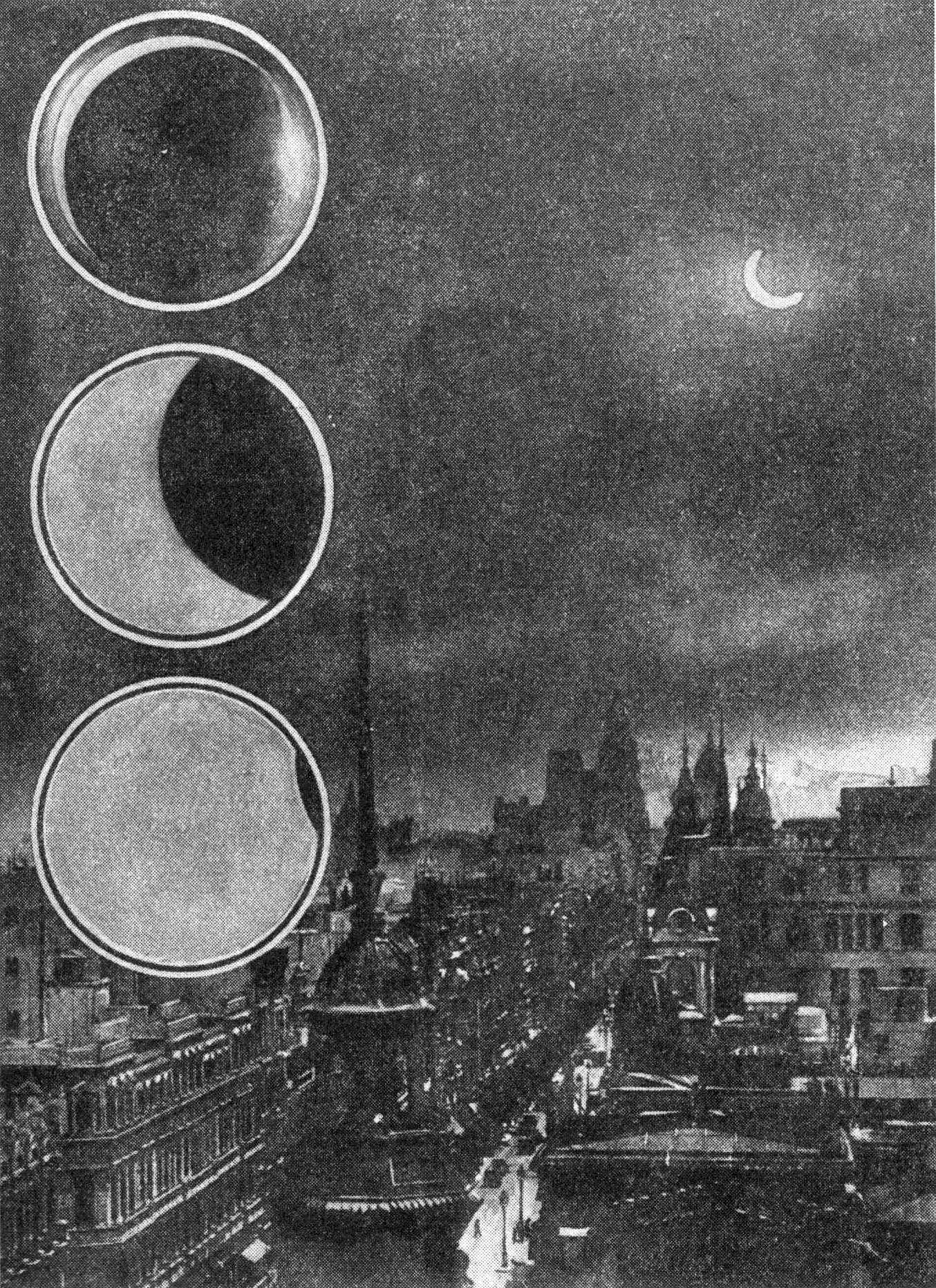
Eclipse over Buenos Aires

- British concessions in China, located at Hankou (Hankow) and Jiujiang (Kiukiang) were invaded by crowds of protesters against British imperialism. A British soldier fired into the crowd at Hankou, killing one protester and wounding dozens of others. Within days, Britain relinquished control of both concessions to the Chinese government, but soon sent troops to protect its concession at Shanghai.
- A large annular solar eclipse covered 99.947% of the Sun, creating a dramatic spectacle for observers in only a tiny path, just 2.1 km wide; however, it was fleeting, lasting a very brief 2.62 seconds at the point of maximum eclipse. The path of the eclipse took it over New Zealand and Argentina.
- Born: William Boyett, American character actor known for portraying law enforcement officials, primarily as the co-star, with Martin Milner and Kent McCord as LAPD Sergeant "Mac" MacDonald on all episodes of Adam-12; in Akron, Ohio (d. 2004)

== January 4, 1927 (Tuesday) ==
- Boris Rtcheouloff filed a patent application for "Means of recording and reproducing pictures, images and the like", the first means for magnetic recording of a television signal onto a moving strip. British patent no. 288,680 was granted in 1928, but the forerunner of videotape was never manufactured.
- Born: Dr. Thomas Noguchi, Japanese-born American pathologist and Los Angeles County Coroner and Chief Medical Examiner from 1967 to 1982, known for his autopsies on famous people who died in Los Angeles; as Tsunetomi Noguchi in Fukuoka Prefecture
- Died: Süleyman Nazif, 56, Turkish poet and journalist (b. 1870)

== January 5, 1927 (Wednesday) ==
- A force of 160 United States Marines was dispatched to Nicaragua for the purpose of protecting the American embassy in Managua. The Marines arrived the next day at Corinto on the USS Galveston.
- Born: Satguru Sivaya Subramuniyaswami, Hindu guru, author and publisher; as Robert Hansen in Oakland, California (d. 2001)

== January 6, 1927 (Thursday) ==
- Robert G. Elliott, the state electrician for several states, carried out six executions in the electric chair in the same day. In the morning, he put to death Edward Hinlein, John Devereaux and John McGlaughlin in Boston for the 1925 murder of a night watchman. Elliott then caught a train to New York, had dinner, took his family to the movies, and then went up to Sing Sing, where he carried out the capital punishment for Charles Goldson, Edgar Humes and George Williams for the 1926 murder of another watchman.

== January 7, 1927 (Friday) ==
- At 8:44 am in New York City and 1:44 pm in London, the first transatlantic telephone call was made between the two cities. Walter S. Gifford of AT&T was connected with Sir G. Evelyn V. Murray of the General Post Office. A half minute later, the two were talking.
- Philo T. Farnsworth, a 20-year-old American inventor, filed his first of many patent applications, for a method of electronically scanning images and transmitting them as a television signal. U.S. Patent No. 1,773,980 was granted on August 26, 1930.
- The Harlem Globetrotters played their very first road game, against a local team in Hinckley, Illinois. Founded by Abe Saperstein, the all African-American team was originally called "Saperstein's New York", before assuming its current name in the 1930s.
- Shadow Lawn, the West Long Branch, New Jersey, home that had served as the "Summer White House" for Woodrow Wilson from 1916 to 1920, was destroyed by a fire.

== January 8, 1927 (Saturday) ==
- The Kate Adams, last of the "side-wheeler" steamboats in the United States, was destroyed by fire while at its moorings in Memphis, Tennessee.

== January 9, 1927 (Sunday) ==
- For the first time in the 368-year history of the Index Librorum Prohibitorum, the Roman Catholic Church's list of prohibited books, a newspaper was banned by papal decree. Pope Pius XI banned the French royalist daily Action Française for articles "written against the Holy See and the supreme pontiff himself".
- Seventy-eight children were killed in a panic that followed the outbreak of a fire at the Laurier Palace cinema in Montreal. Shortly after the 2:00 matinee began, flames were spotted. On three of the theatre's four fire exits, the evacuation was orderly, but on the stairway at the east side of the building, children were trampled five steps away from the door. The dead ranged in age from 4 to 16. Only one of the victims was older than 18.

== January 10, 1927 (Monday) ==
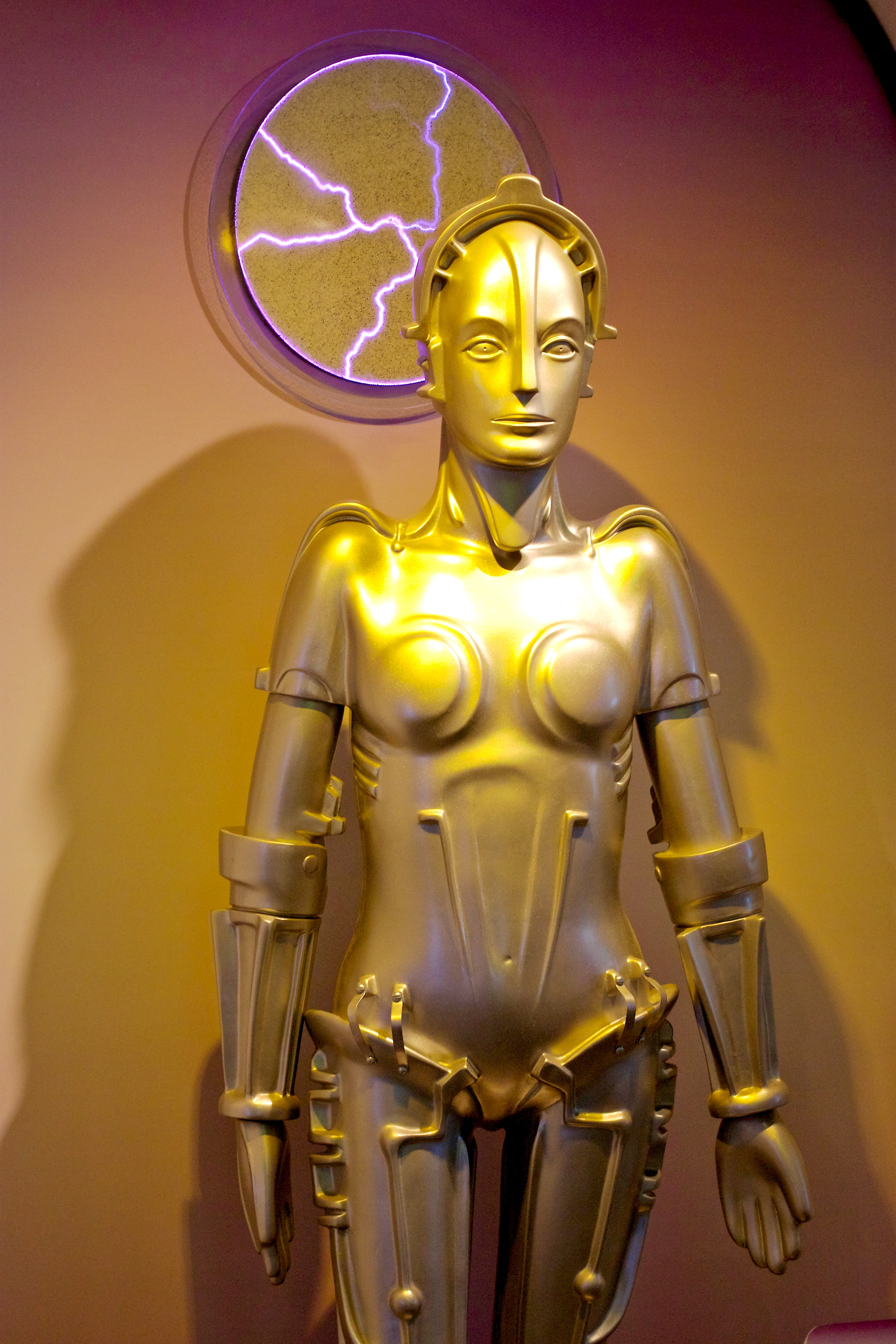
Replica of the Maria robot from Metropolis

- Fritz Lang's silent science fiction film Metropolis had its world premiere at the Ufa-Palast am Zoo in Berlin.
- In a special message to Congress, President Coolidge said that the 15 American warships and 5,000 members of the Navy and the Marines would be dispatched toward Nicaragua and Mexico to protect American interests. On the same day, the U.S. Department of the Navy announced that 800 U.S. Marines would be sent to China for the same purpose, to be transported from Guam by the cruiser USS Huron.
- Born:
  - Gisele MacKenzie, Canadian-born singer; in Winnipeg (d. 2003)
  - Johnnie Ray, American singer; in Hopewell, Oregon (d. 1990)
  - Otto Stich, Swiss Federal Council executive 1983–1995; President, 1988 and 1994 (d. 2012)

== January 11, 1927 (Tuesday) ==
- The American freighter John Tracy, with 27 men on board, foundered and sank off Cape Cod during a winter storm. Wreckage, including the vessel's nameplate, would be recovered ten days later.
- Thirty-six Hollywood celebrities gathered at the Ambassador Hotel in Los Angeles and founded the Academy of Motion Picture Arts and Sciences, for the purpose of acknowledging cinematic excellence. The academy's awards for motion picture industry would later be nicknamed "The Oscars".
- Died: Houston Chamberlain, 71, British anti-Semite turned German Nazi. His book The Foundations of the Nineteenth Century was an inspiration for the Nazi ideology.

== January 12, 1927 (Wednesday) ==
- Major League Baseball Commissioner Kenesaw Mountain Landis exonerated 21 members of the Detroit Tigers and the Chicago White Sox from accusations of conspiring to bring about a Detroit loss in four-game series in 1917.

== January 13, 1927 (Thursday) ==
- At Tampico, Mexico, the British steamer Essex Isles exploded while its cargo of gasoline barrels was being unloaded. Thirty-seven men, mostly Mexican dockworkers, died in the accident.
- Belgium became the first European power to renounce any claims to use of territory in China, and ceded back a concession that had been granted to it at Tianjin.
- Born:
  - Brock Adams, U.S. Congressman for Washington 1965–77, and U.S. Senator 1987–93; in Atlanta, Georgia (d. 2004)
  - Sydney Brenner, South African biologist, Nobel Prize winner 2002; in Germiston, Gauteng (d. 2019)

== January 14, 1927 (Friday) ==
- With four days left in her term, Texas Governor Miriam A. Ferguson (known popularly as "Ma Ferguson") halted further grants of clemency to Texas convicts. The lame duck governor had pardoned or commuted the sentences of a record 3,595 persons convicted of crimes, including 1,350 full pardons.

== January 15, 1927 (Saturday) ==
- The English broadcaster and rugby player Teddy Wakelam gave the first ever running sports commentary on BBC Radio, a Rugby International match between England and Wales from the Twickenham stadium in Middlesex, which England won by 11 points to 9.
- In a split decision on the appeal of the verdict in the Scopes Trial, the Tennessee Supreme Court upheld the constitutionality of Section 49-1922 of the Tennessee Code, which prohibited the teaching of evolution. The Court set aside the order for the fine levied against teacher John T. Scopes. Chief Justice Grafton Green said, "All of us agree that nothing is to be gained by prolonging the life of this bizarre case."
- The Dumbarton Bridge linking the town of Newark, California to the city of Menlo Park opened to traffic, becoming the first auto bridge over San Francisco Bay.
- Born: Yaakov Heruti, Polish-born Israeli Zionist militant and political activist (d. 2022)

== January 16, 1927 (Sunday) ==
- George Young, a 17-year-old from Toronto, became the first person to swim the 22 miles (35 km) between Catalina Island, California, and the mainland. At noon the previous day, 102 competitors dove into the waters for the prize offered by William Wrigley, Jr. Young was the only person to finish the task, arriving at the Point Vincente Lighthouse at 3:47 a.m.

== January 17, 1927 (Monday) ==
- Movie comedian Charlie Chaplin was ordered to pay $4,000 a month alimony to his wife, Lita Grey Chaplin, by a Los Angeles court. The same day, the Internal Revenue Service filed a lien against Chaplin for seven years of back taxes and penalties, totalling $1,073,721.47 between 1918 and 1924.
- Born: Eartha Kitt, American actress and singer; in North, South Carolina (d. 2008)
- Died: Juliette Gordon Low, founder of the Girl Scouts of the USA (b. 1860)

== January 18, 1927 (Tuesday) ==
- American ratification of the 1923 Treaty of Lausanne, and the establishment of diplomatic relations with Turkey, failed to get approval in the U.S. Senate. Though favored by a 50–34 margin, a two-thirds majority was needed.
- The Food, Drug, and Insecticide Administration was established as part of the U.S. Department of Agriculture.

== January 19, 1927 (Wednesday) ==
- The first legislative session held in The Council House of India (now the Parliament House) was opened with a meeting of the Central Legislative Assembly. The House, a circular building covering nearly six acres, is now part of the Parliament Assembly where the Lok Sabha and the Rajya Sabha convene.
- Died: Empress Carlota of Mexico, 86, Belgian princess whose husband reigned as Emperor Maximilian I of Mexico from 1864 to 1867.

== January 20, 1927 (Thursday) ==
- Frank L. Smith, recently selected to serve as a United States Senator from Illinois, was not allowed to take the oath of office. The U.S. Senate voted 48–33 against seating him pending further investigation of the financing of his 1926 primary election campaign.

== January 21, 1927 (Friday) ==
- The Movietone sound system, developed by Fox Film Corporation (later 20th Century Fox) was first demonstrated to the public, at the Sam H. Harris Theatre in New York City. Shown by a movie projector equipped to play sound-on-film, the one-reel film preceded the feature presentation, What Price Glory?. Though not quite synchronized, the film included the sight and sound of popular singer Raquel Meller.

== January 22, 1927 (Saturday) ==
- The second sports broadcast in the United Kingdom was made by BBC Radio, with Teddy Wakelam providing the play-by-play of a soccer football game between Arsenal and Sheffield United. Subscribers to Radio Times could follow the game with a diagram, designed by producer Lance Sieveking, that divided the field into eight squares. The game ended in a 1–1 draw.

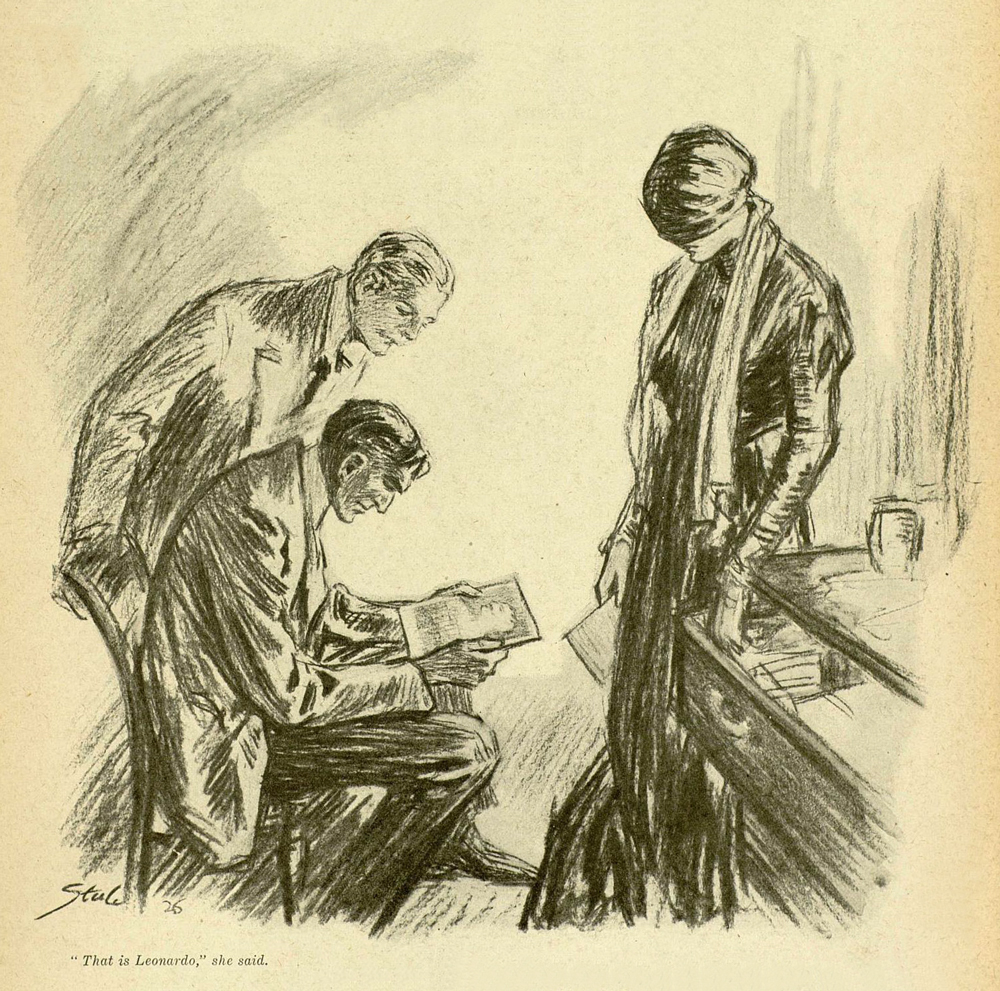
Holmes and Watson help a woman with a problem in "The Adventure of the Veiled Lodger"

- The Sherlock Holmes short story "The Adventure of the Veiled Lodger" by Sir Arthur Conan Doyle was published for the first time in Liberty magazine in the United States.
- A bus, carrying the Baylor University basketball team to a scheduled game against the University of Texas, was struck at a railroad crossing near Round Rock, Texas. Ten students (including five members of the team) were killed and seven seriously injured.
- The Tamanweis, a war ceremonial for the Swinomish American Indian tribe, was performed for the first time since it had been outlawed by federal law. The occasion, a celebration at La Conner, Washington, of the 1855 Mukiliteo peace treaty, also saw a traditional feast and the playing of the game "Fla-Hal".
- The comedy film The Kid Brother starring Harold Lloyd was released.

== January 23, 1927 (Sunday) ==
- Ban Johnson, who had been President of baseball's American League since its founding in 1900, was fired by vote of the league's eight teams. Johnson had publicly criticized the ruling, by baseball commissioner Landis, on the Black Sox Scandal. Eight years remained on his contract, so he retained his title, but his duties were assumed by Frank J. Navin of the Detroit Tigers.
- California Attorney General Ulysses S. Webb rendered an attorney general opinion that dark-skinned Mexican-Americans could be classified as "American Indians" under the state's school segregation law.

== January 24, 1927 (Monday) ==
- The United Kingdom dispatched 16,000 servicemen to defend the British concession in Shanghai. Commanded by Major General John Duncan, the Shanghai Defense Force consisted of 12,000 men from the 13th and 14th British infantry brigades, and the 20th Indian Infantry, to join 3,000 naval ratings and 1,000 marines.

== January 25, 1927 (Tuesday) ==
- At Oslo, the Storthing voted 112 to 33 to reject a proposal for the complete disarmament of Norway. A bill to reorganize the army and navy was approved as an alternative.
- Amid fears that the Coolidge Administration would lead the United States into war with Mexico, the U.S. Senate voted 79–0 to ask President Coolidge to seek arbitration of disputes over oil rights.
- The merger of the Remington Typewriter Company and Rand-Kardex Bureau, Inc. (created from the merger of two business recordkeeping systems) formed Remington Rand, which would make the UNIVAC, the world's first business computer. Through further mergers, the company became Sperry Rand (1955), and Unisys (1986).
- J. Frank Norris, popular Southern Baptist leader, was acquitted of murder charges arising from the July 17, 1926, death of wholesale lumberman Dexter B. Chipps.
- Born: Antonio Carlos Jobim, Brazilian composer credited with popularizing the bossa nova style; in Rio de Janeiro (d. 1994)

== January 26, 1927 (Wednesday) ==
- The American College of Osteopathic Surgeons (ACOS), a non-profit organization to promote osteopathic medicine in the United States, was incorporated in Chicago.
- In Bannock County, Idaho, a basketball game in the town of Turner ended in tragedy when an explosion toppled the walls at the recreation hall of the Mormon chapel. Seven people were killed and 20 others seriously injured. The lights had failed and a person lit a match, triggering a gas explosion.
- Born: José Azcona del Hoyo, President of Honduras 1986–1990; in La Ceiba (d. 2005)
- Died: Lyman J. Gage, 91, American financier and former U.S. Secretary of the Treasury

== January 27, 1927 (Thursday) ==
- United Independent Broadcasters, Inc., was incorporated as a network of 16 radio stations. On September 18, 1927, United would be acquired by William S. Paley and renamed the Columbia Broadcasting System, providing CBS Radio, and later the CBS Television Network.
- A year after proclaiming himself King of the Hejaz, Arabian sultan Ibn Saud proclaimed himself as King of Najd as well. The independence of the Kingdom of Hejaz and Nejd was recognized on May 20, 1927, and renamed as the Kingdom of Saudi Arabia in 1932.
- Ty Cobb and Tris Speaker, two of the greatest outfielders in American baseball history, were both exonerated of charges of wrongdoing by Commissioner Landis. Both had been accused, by Dutch Leonard, of conspiracy to throw a game in 1919. Cobb was elected to baseball's Hall of Fame in its first year (1936), and Speaker in its second.

== January 28, 1927 (Friday) ==
- A hurricane swept across the British Isles, killing twenty people and injuring hundreds. Nineteen of the dead were in Scotland, including eight in Glasgow, and another person was killed in Ireland. The storm moved on a line from Land's End in England, to John O'Groats in Scotland.
- Born: Hiroshi Teshigahara, Japanese director; in Chiyoda (d. 2001)

== January 29, 1927 (Saturday) ==
- In Schenectady, New York, the General Electric Company demonstrated its own sound-on-film process, the first to synchronize recorded sights and sounds on a single strip of film. The product of six years research opened a new era in movies, taking the world from silent films to the "talkies".
- Born:
  - Lewis Urry, Canadian engineer who invented the alkaline battery and the lithium battery; in Pontypool, Ontario (d. 2004)
  - Edward Abbey, American environmentalist; in Indiana, Pennsylvania (d. 1989)

== January 30, 1927 (Sunday) ==
- At the Austrian village of Schattendorf, members of the right-wing veterans' organization "Frontkampfer Vereinigung" fired on members of the leftist organization Schutzbund, killing one of them and seriously wounding five others. An 8-year old bystander was killed by the gunfire. When a jury acquitted the three Frontkampfer members six months later, 84 protesters were killed by the Austrian police.
- Born: Olof Palme, Prime Minister of Sweden 1969–76 and 1982–86; in Östermalm (assassinated 1986)

== January 31, 1927 (Monday) ==
- After seven years, the Inter-Allied Military Commission, which had overseen the occupation of Germany since the end of World War I, closed its headquarters in Berlin after France's Marshal Ferdinand Foch declared that Germany's obligations under the Treaty of Versailles had been completed.
- Mae West's play The Drag, the first theatrical production to address homosexuality, had its world premiere in Bridgeport, Connecticut. West hired 40 gay men for the cast. Although profitable, the play was banned by police in Bayonne, New Jersey, and was unable to find a theatre in New York City.
- Died: Sybil Bauer, 23, American swimmer who broke 23 women's world records and (in 1922) the men's world record for the 440 backstroke, died of cancer. Bauer, who did not learn to swim until she was 15, had been engaged to marry Ed Sullivan.
