= February 1927 =

Month of 1927

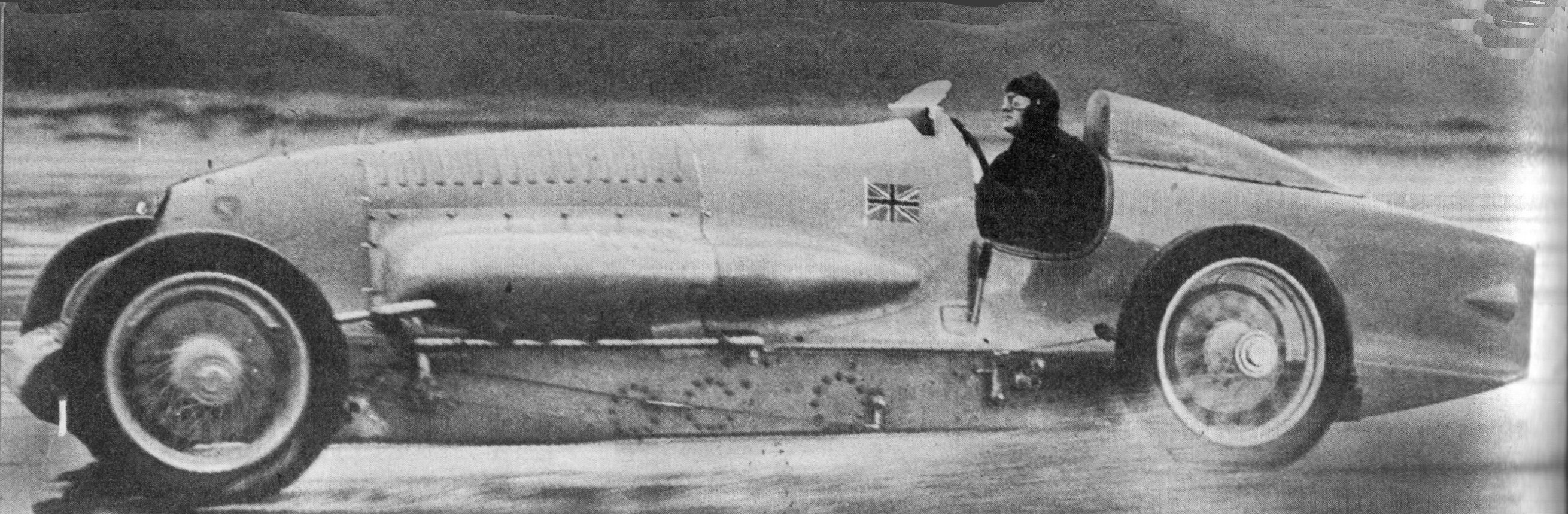
February 4, 1927: Malcolm Campbell sets new speed record at 174.883 mph

| << | February 1927 | | | | | >> |
| Su | Mo | Tu | We | Th | Fr | Sa |
| | | 1 | 2 | 3 | 4 | 5 |
| 6 | 7 | 8 | 9 | 10 | 11 | 12 |
| 13 | 14 | 15 | 16 | 17 | 18 | 19 |
| 20 | 21 | 22 | 23 | 24 | 25 | 26 |
| 27 | 28 |

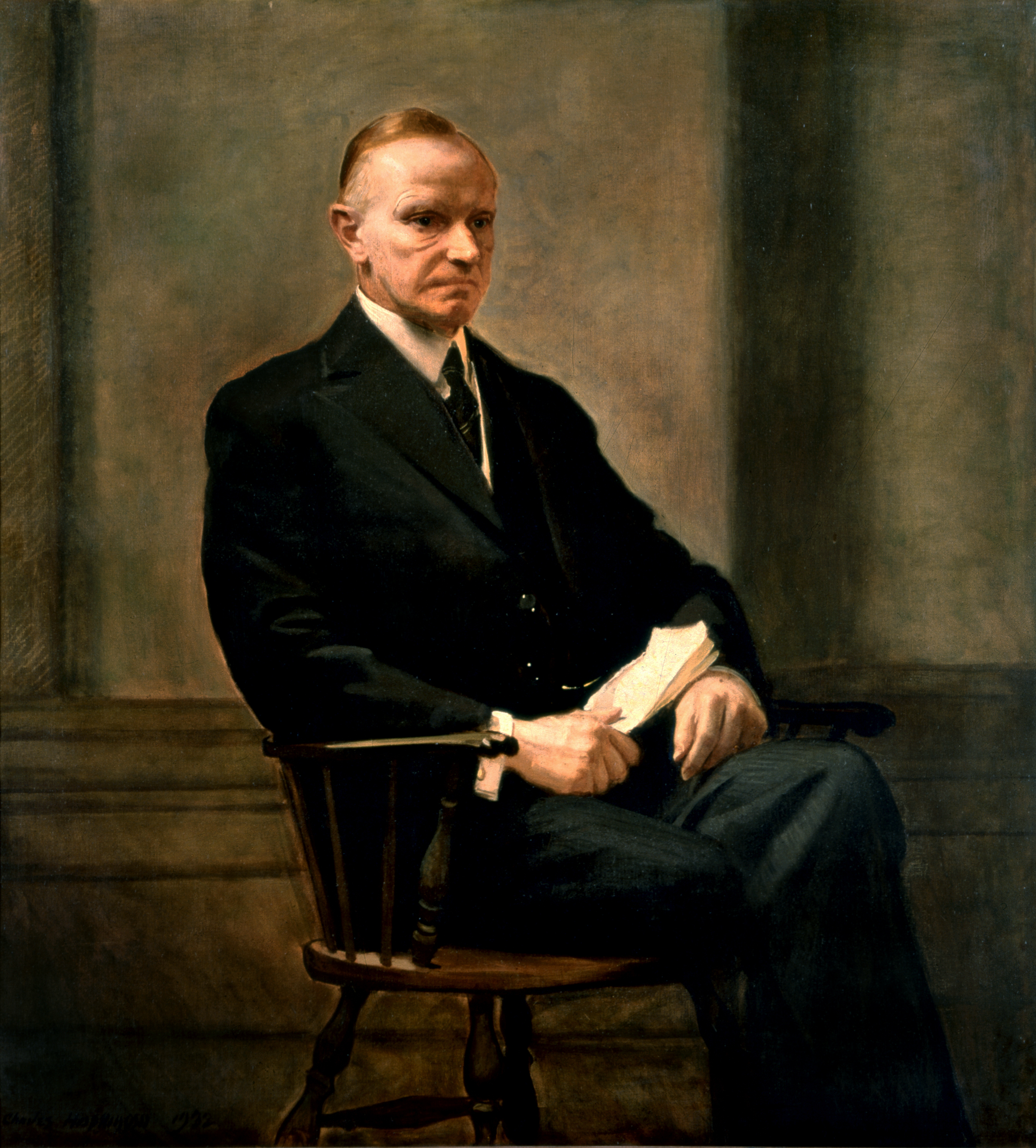
February 10, 1927: U.S. President Coolidge announces world peace conference

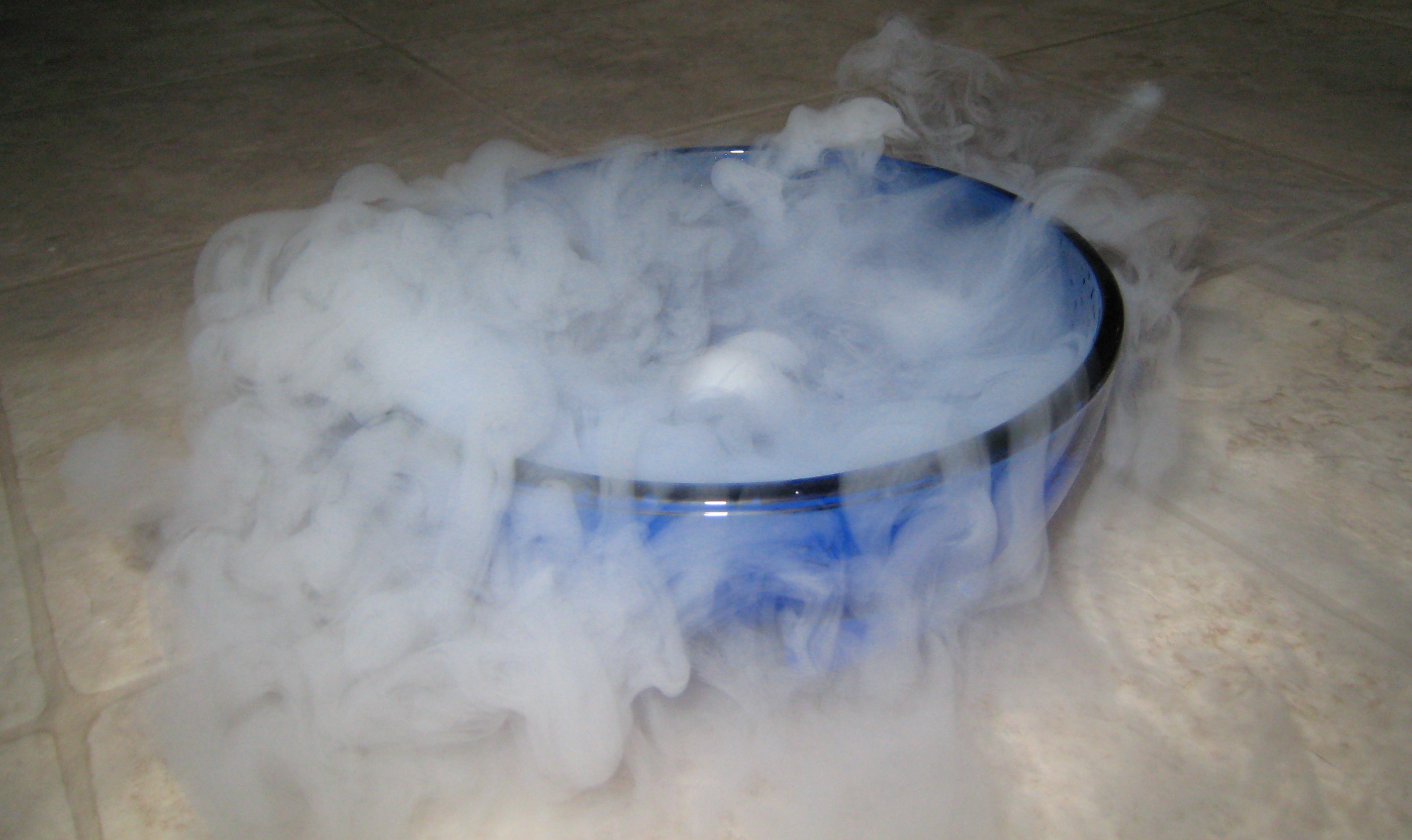
February 19, 1927: "Dry ice" introduced to public

The following events occurred in February 1927:

February 23, 1927: Heisenberg explains his "Uncertainty Principle"

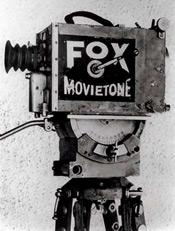
February 24, 1927: Fox Movietone News demonstrated

== February 1, 1927 (Tuesday) ==
- In its third year of conferring B.A. degrees, the "Southern Branch of the University of California" formally changed to its present name to the University of California at Los Angeles, more commonly referred to as UCLA.
- The first seaside resort hotel in Hawaii, the Royal Hawaiian Hotel opened for business. Now called the "Pink Palace", the hotel originally owned 15 acres (6.1 ha) of land in Honolulu at Waikiki.
- On the same day, the first and only luxury hotel in Death Valley National Park— originally called The Furnace Creek Inn, and later the Oasis at Death Valley— opened in the California desert.
- Born: Galway Kinnell, American poet; in Providence, Rhode Island (d. 2014)
- Died: Sir George Higginson, 100, British general and Crimean War hero

== February 2, 1927 (Wednesday) ==
- After ax murderer George J. Hassell gave directions, police in Whittier, California unearthed the bodies of his wife and three children. Hassell, on death row in Texas for the murder there of a second wife and eight other children, earned a postponement of his February 27 execution date.
- The Ziegfeld Theatre opened on Broadway with the production Rio Rita. The building was razed in 1967
- Born: Stan Getz, American jazz saxophonist; in Philadelphia (d. 1991)

== February 3, 1927 (Thursday) ==
- A revolt against the government of Portugal broke out at Porto. After six days of fighting, and at least 120 deaths, the rebels surrendered after it appeared that Porto would be destroyed by heavy artillery. More than 600 conspirators and participants were exiled to Portugal's colonies in the Azores and Cape Verde.
- The 4th Regiment of the United States Marines, with 1,200 men, was dispatched from San Diego to protect Americans in Shanghai. After arriving on the transport USS Chaumont on February 27, the unit continued its presence in Shanghai until 1941.
- The Brazilian airline VARIG (Viação Aérea Rio-Grandense) began operations.
- William Phillips was named as the first U.S. Minister to Canada, and Frederick A. Sterling was named as the first United States Ambassador to Ireland. Prior to 1927, diplomatic relations with Canada and the Irish Free State had been conducted directly with the United Kingdom.
- Born:
  - Val Doonican, Irish singer and TV personality; in Waterford (d. 2015)
  - Blas Ople, Philippine Secretary of Foreign Affairs from 2002 until his death in 2003; in Hagonoy (d. 2003)

== February 4, 1927 (Friday) ==
- Malcolm Campbell of England broke the world's record for the fastest speed in an automobile, driving at nearly 175 miles (282 km) per hour on the Pendine Sands in Wales. Driving the Napier-Campbell Blue Bird, Campbell averaged 174.883 mph (281.447 km/h).
- U.S. Senator Matthew M. Neely (D-WV) introduced a bill in the Senate to provide a $5,000,000 reward to the discoverer of a cure for cancer. Neely would die of cancer on January 18, 1958, after his own 15-month battle with the disease.
- Flying in an airplane approximately 4,000 feet (1,200 m) above Columbus Circle in New York City, baritone John Charles Thomas sang operatic arias to an audience in the first public test of what he called the "Voice of the Sky", a secret sound-reproducing and amplifying device which makes possible direct vocal communication between aircraft and any one on the ground.

== February 5, 1927 (Saturday) ==
- The Royal Australasian College of Surgeons (RACS), described as "a non-profit organisation training surgeons and maintaining surgical standards in Australia and New Zealand", was founded.
- The United States Tennis Association dropped its 1926 national champion, Vincent Richards, from its rankings after Richards became the most famous player to that time to turn professional. Bill Tilden, at that time still an amateur, replaced Richards at #1 in the rankings.

== February 6, 1927 (Sunday) ==
- In Nicaragua, a force of 1,500 rebels captured the city of Chinandega and burned the city, at one time the national capital. Government troops retook the town after a battle of five days. Reportedly, 300 people were killed and 500 were wounded. At the request of President Adolfo Díaz, the United States sent troops to Chinandega.

== February 7, 1927 (Monday) ==
- The first revision of the Book of Common Prayer since 1662 was introduced at 3:00 pm at Westminster Abbey. The Archbishop of Canterbury received the proposed revisions for a new prayer book for the Church of England, "the outcome of sixty years of study and effort designed to make the church services richer and more elastic". The new book quickly became a bestseller for Anglicans and Episcopalians worldwide, but failed to receive the required approval. The House of Commons twice voted against a bill to accept the new text, a resolution that would still have required the approval of the House of Lords and royal assent by the King in his capacity as Supreme Governor of the Church of England.
- Born:
  - Vladimir Kuts, Ukrainian Soviet distance runner, 1956 Olympic gold for the 5,000 meter race (and holder of the world record from 1957 to 1965) as well the world record for the 10,000 meters from 1956 to 1960) (committed suicide, 1975)
  - Juliette Gréco, French singer and film actress; in Montpellier, Hérault département (d. 2020)

== February 8, 1927 (Tuesday) ==
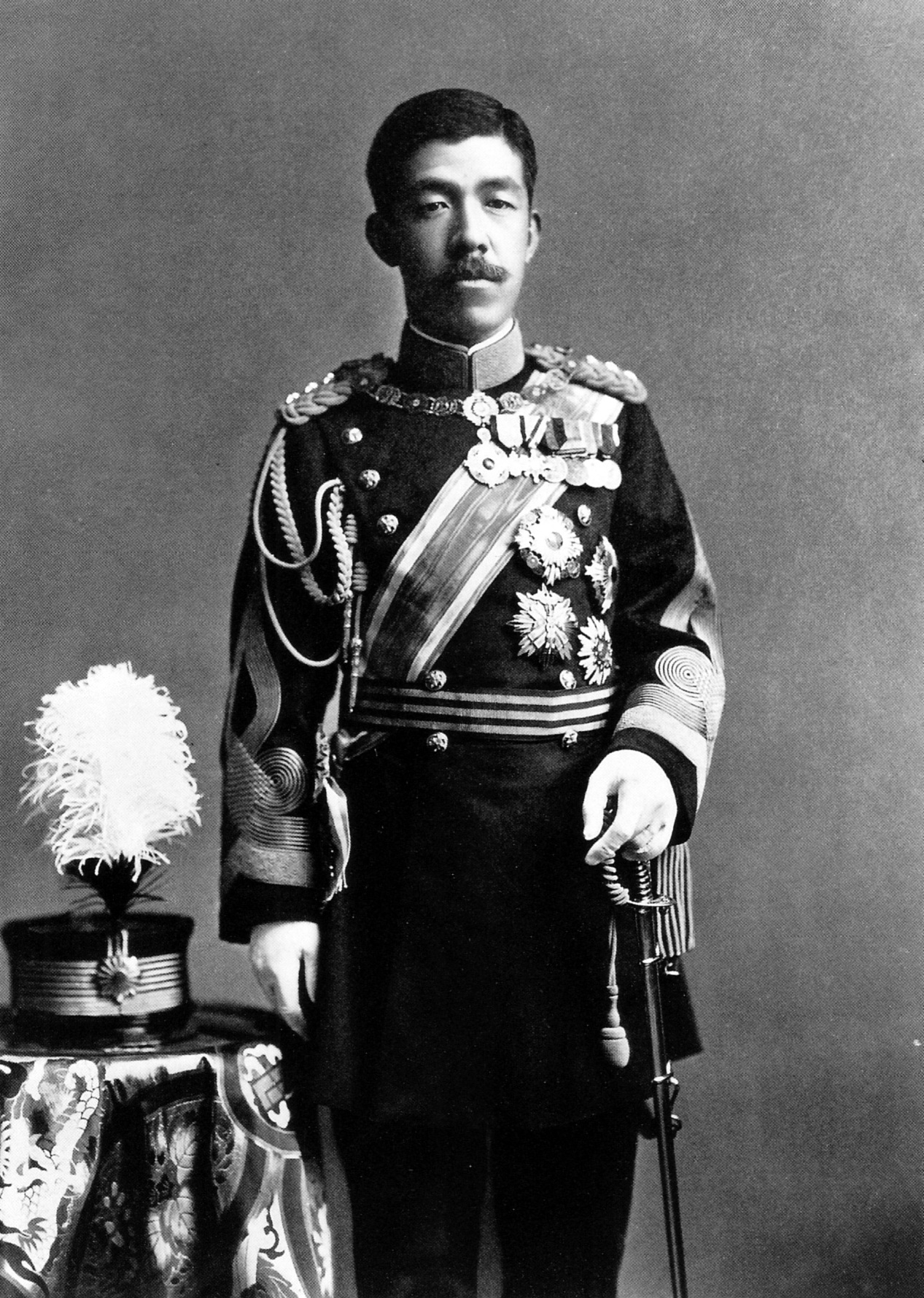
Emperor Taishō

- In what the American press described as "the most pretentious funeral in the history of the Orient", the Emperor Taishō, known in the West as Yoshihito, was buried after being mourned by his 80,000,000 subjects in Japan, who thought of him as a deity.

== February 9, 1927 (Wednesday) ==
- By a 59–30 vote, the United States Senate rejected American participation in the Permanent Court of International Justice of the League of Nations, more popularly known as the "World Court".
- The strongest gun control legislation in the United States, to that time, was signed by U.S. President Calvin Coolidge. Taking effect on May 10, the Miller Act prohibited the sending of revolvers, pistols and other small arms through the mail. The ban was easily evaded by using private shipping companies.

== February 10, 1927 (Thursday) ==
- President Coolidge addressed a joint session of the United States Congress and announced that he would invite the world's major powers to meet in Geneva to discuss further reductions of their navies. In 1922, the Washington Naval Treaty had been signed by the U.S., the United Kingdom, France, Italy and Japan. As one historian noted, "The hastily conceived meeting, which [Coolidge] expected to parallel the success of the 1921-22 naval conference, turned out to be a fiasco."
- The first contingent of American troops in China arrived as 300 U.S. Marines arrived at Shanghai to protect U.S. citizens there.
- Jonny spielt auf, Ernst Krenek's opera about an African-American jazz musician, premiered in Leipzig and became a hit in Germany.
- Born: Leontyne Price, African-American operatic soprano and prima donna; in Laurel, Mississippi (alive in 2026)
- Died: Frank S. Ryan, 46, American con man who at one time was known as the "prince of clairvoyants" until his nationwide ring was broken in 1914

== February 11, 1927 (Friday) ==
- Billy Gaffney, a 4-year-old boy, was kidnapped while playing near his apartment building at 99 Fifteenth Street in Brooklyn, and was never found. More than eight years later, convicted child murderer Albert Fish confessed to abducting and killing Gaffney.
- The city of Homewood, Alabama, near Birmingham, was created by the merger of the towns of Rosedale, Edgewood and Grove Park.

== February 12, 1927 (Saturday) ==
- The first contingent of British troops landed in Shanghai to begin protection of British citizens. Within a week, 21 warships from the U.S., Britain, Japan, France and Italy had anchored at the Huangpu River.

== February 13, 1927 (Sunday) ==
- Three months before Charles Lindbergh's nonstop flight across the North Atlantic, two Italian army officers, Lt. Col. Francesco de Pinedo and Lt. Col. Carlo del Prete, began the longest airplane tour to that time. Taking off from Sesto Calende in a Savoia-Marchetti S.55, de Pinedo and del Prete made fifty stops over four months in Europe, Africa, and North and South America, traveling 30,000 miles (48,000 km) with 193 hours flying time.
- A series of twenty earthquake tremors in one hour in Bosnia killed about 100 people in an area along the Neretva River. While the death toll was initially believed to be 700 or more, the areas hit were sparsely populated and the loss of life was less than expected.
- Died: Brooks Adams, 78, American economic historian

== February 14, 1927 (Monday) ==
- In a 24-hour period, a winter storm dumped 2.30 meters of snow on Japan's Mount Ibuki to set a new record for largest snowfall. It is also the record for the highest total snow depth by 11.82 meters (almost 38.78 feet).
- Conn Smythe purchased the Toronto St. Patricks hockey team, preventing it from being moved to Philadelphia, and renamed it the Toronto Maple Leafs, after the Maple Leaf Regiment which fought for Canada in World War One. As the St. Pats, the team had lost 1 to 0, on the 13th, to the Ottawa Senators, and was in last place in its division at 8-18-4. With a new name, the Maple Leafs played their first game on the 15th in Windsor, Ontario, and lost to the Detroit Cougars (which would in 1932 be renamed the Detroit Red Wings), 5 to 1.
- Boxer Jimmy Delaney defeated future light heavyweight boxing champion Maxie Rosenbloom in a bout in Cincinnati, but splintered a bone in his left elbow in the process. After a loss the next week to Benny Ross, Delaney sought medical treatment, but would die of blood poisoning from an infection on March 4.
- English suspense film director Alfred Hitchcock began his practice of making a cameo appearance in movies he directing, starting with the release of his first thriller, The Lodger: A Story of the London Fog.
- William Vanderbilt, an explosives expert, committed suicide in Peabody, Massachusetts, by exploding himself. Vanderbilt, 70, wandered into the woods near his home to an isolated location with multiple sticks of dynamite, then detonated his homemade bomb. The blast was powerful enough that residents thought that they were experiencing an earthquake
- William Gemmell, a wealthy county commissioner in Montana, jumped to his death from his room on the 5th floor of the Silver Bow Hotel in Butte, Montana when he was unable to escape from a fire.
- Born: Lois Maxwell, Canadian film actress who portrayed "Miss Moneypenny" in 14 James Bond films; in Kitchener, Ontario; (d. 2007)

== February 15, 1927 (Tuesday) ==
- California was struck by the worst storm in that state's history, up to that time, as hurricane force winds and torrential rains killed 24 people. Thirteen of the dead had been employees of California Edison Company, killed when an avalanche buried their homes in the Sierra Nevada mountains.
- For the first time in half a century, travel across the English Channel came to a halt, as a dense fog in England continued into its fifth day. "Many veteran channel-commuters simply refused to believe it", noted one account. "It had never occurred to them that such a time would come to Britain, and they hounded passenger agents with comments and queries."
- Born: Harvey Korman, American comedian; in Chicago (d. 2008)

== February 16, 1927 (Wednesday) ==
- Sir Oliver Lodge conducted an experiment in telepathy on BBC Radio, asking listeners to give their impressions as a team of people concentrated on images on a set of cards. Out of 24,659 responses, as many as 190 correctly noted that a two of clubs had been drawn, but, writes Harry Price, "it is obvious that there was no evidence of anything but pure chance".
- Mao Zedong delivered his "Report on an Investigation of the Peasant Movement in Hunan" to the Central Committee of China's fledgling Communist Party. Summing up 32 days of interviews, Mao predicted "Within a short time, hundreds of millions of peasants will rise in Central, South, and North China, with the fury of a hurricane; no power, however strong, can restrain them."
- Born: June Brown, British TV soap opera actress known for portraying Dot Cotton on EastEnders; in Needham Market, Suffolk (d 2022)

== February 17, 1927 (Thursday) ==
- Turkey and U.S. re-established diplomatic relations, which had been severed April 20, 1917, after the two nations were on opposite sides of World War One.

== February 18, 1927 (Friday) ==
- By voice vote, the United States Senate passed the White-Dill bill, the Radio Act of 1927. President Coolidge signed the measure into law five days later, creating what is now the Federal Communications Commission.
- Diplomatic relations Canada and United States formally began as U.S. President Coolidge received the credentials of Charles Vincent Massey, first Canadian Minister to the United States, in a half-hour ceremony at the White House. Prior to 1927, American relations concerning Canada were conducted through the United Kingdom.
- Born: John Warner, United States Senator (R-Virginia) from 1979 to 2009, and one-time husband of Elizabeth Taylor; in Washington, D.C. (d. 2021)

== February 19, 1927 (Saturday) ==
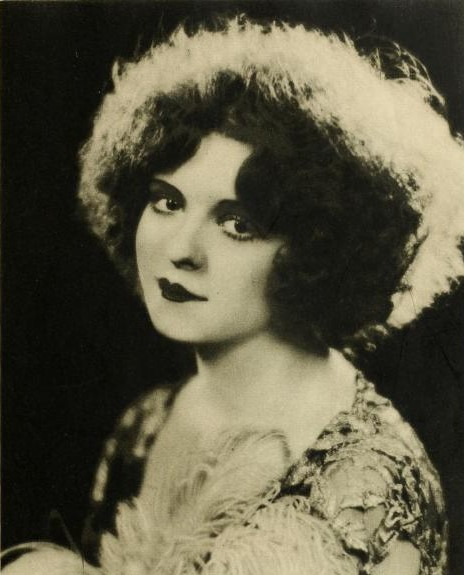
Clara Bow, "The 'It' Girl"

- "Dry ice", it was announced by the American Chemical Society in a press conference in New York, would become available worldwide as the result of the perfection, by of a process that "converts solid carbon dioxide into a practical portable 'ice'" "Synthetic 'Dry Ice' Is Invented As Shipment Aid". The mass production of "frozen CO_{2}", which "melted" more slowly than frozen water, was a milestone in transporting perishable foods, because far less of it was required—1,200 pounds of dry ice could replace 17,000 pounds of regular ice and 1,700 pounds of salt, freeing up more space for products.
- Radio station CFRB began broadcasting in Toronto as the first station in the world to rely on alternating current (AC) rather than direct current (DC).
- The romantic comedy film It was released, starring Clara Bow in the role that made her a major star.
- Born: Ernest Trova, American pop art sculptor; in Clayton, Missouri (d. 2009)

== February 20, 1927 (Sunday) ==
- The United States increased the number of troops committed to Nicaragua, as 800 U.S. Marines arrived at Corinto, half of a group of 1,600 that had been mobilized three days earlier. Within the week, the American grew fivefold, from 400 to 2,000.
- Born:
  - Sidney Poitier, African-American film actor and director; in Miami (d. 2022)
  - Roy Cohn, American prosecutor during McCarthy Era; in New York City (d.1986)
  - Ibrahim Ferrer, Cuban singer; in San Luis, Santiago de Cuba (d. 2005)
  - Hubert de Givenchy, French fashion designer, in Beauvais (d. 2018)

== February 21, 1927 (Monday) ==
- Nicaragua's President Adolfo Díaz asked that his nation become a protectorate of the United States, and proposed to sign a 100-year treaty to allow American troops to occupy the Central American nation. President Coolidge declined to take the offer seriously, but U.S. troops remained in Nicaragua until 1933.
- In its decision in Farrington v. Tokushige, the United States Supreme Court invalidated, as unconstitutional, a law in Hawaii that required schools to receive a license from the state before they could teach any languages other than English.
- The city of West Vernon, Texas, was incorporated. It existed until 1944, when it was annexed into Vernon, Texas.
- Born: Erma Bombeck, American humorist and newspaper columnist known for her column At Wit's End and numerous books; in Bellbrook, Ohio (d. 1996)

== February 22, 1927 (Tuesday) ==
- The Italian team of Lt. Col. Francesco de Pinedo and Lt. Col. Carlo del Prete, flew their airplane in a successful transatlantic flight across the South Atlantic Ocean, from Porto Praya in the Cape Verde Islands, to Port Natal, Brazil, a distance of 1,433 miles (2,306 km). The distance was slightly more than one third of the 3,624-mile (5,832 km) distance between New York and Paris, subject of the Orteig Prize, which would be awarded for the first transatlantic crossing between two continents.
- Born: Vance Drummond, Australian pilot in the Korean and Vietnam Wars; in Hamilton, New Zealand (d. 1967, plane crash)

== February 23, 1927 (Wednesday) ==
- Werner Heisenberg wrote a 14-page letter to fellow physicist Wolfgang Pauli, describing for the first time a key concept in quantum mechanics that would become known as the Heisenberg uncertainty principle.
- The Radio Act of 1927 was signed into law by U.S. President Coolidge.
- Born: Régine Crespin, French opera soprano; in Marseille (d. 2007)

== February 24, 1927 (Thursday) ==
- The Fox Film Corporation gave its first demonstration of the process that it would use for a new feature, Movietone News, that would allow filmgoers to see and hear scenes from recent events. Fifty reporters were escorted into Fox-Case's New York studios at 10:00 that morning and filmed. Four hours later, the same group saw and heard themselves when the film of the press conference was screened.
- Died: William Fuld, 56, inventor of the Ouija Board, was killed when he fell from the roof of a three-story building.

== February 25, 1927 (Friday) ==
- The McFadden Act was signed into law by U.S. President Coolidge, prohibiting commercial banks from establishing branches in more than one state. The act would not be completely repealed until 1994, when the Riegle-Neal Act was passed.
- On the same day, President Coolidge vetoed the McNary–Haugen Farm Relief Bill, which had passed the Senate 47-39, and the House of Representatives 214-178. Congress failed to override the veto, as well as being unable to overcome a second veto of a new version in 1928. Domestic farm price supports would become law in 1933.

== February 26, 1927 (Saturday) ==
- Instant communication between San Francisco and London (and by extension, the Western United States and Europe), was first achieved at 7:30 am Pacific time and 3:30 pm GMT. H.D. Pillsbury of Pacific Telephone and Telegraph spoke to Col. H.E. Shreeve, an AT&T representative 7,287 miles (11,727 km) away in Britain. In 1915, the two men had spoken during the first phone conversation between San Francisco and New York. "The inauguration of this service", noted one account, "completes the final tie-up in trans-atlantic radio telephone service between the entire United States and England, Scotland and Wales."
- Born:
  - Mark Lane, American lawyer and author who challenged the Warren Commission findings on the Kennedy assassination; in New York City (d. 2016)
  - Tom Kennedy (stage name for James Narz), American TV game show host known for Name That Tune; in Louisville, Kentucky (d. 2020)

== February 27, 1927 (Sunday) ==
- In what one author described as "a milestone in the evolution of Afro-Asian solidarity", the first Congress of Oppressed Nationalists opened in Brussels. Among the delegates who would one day lead their people to independence were Jawaharlal Nehru (India), Ho Chi Minh (Vietnam), Mohammed Hatta (Indonesia) and Léopold Sédar Senghor (Senegal).

== February 28, 1927 (Monday) ==
- Charles Lindbergh arrived at the factory of Ryan Airlines in San Diego, placed the order for the construction of what would become one of the most famous airplanes in history, the Spirit of St. Louis, then remained in the city during the craft's construction.
