= March 1927 =

Month of 1927

<<	March 1927					>>
Su	Mo	Tu	We	Th	Fr	Sa
		1	2	3	4	5
6	7	8	9	10	11	12
13	14	15	16	17	18	19
20	21	22	23	24	25	26
27	28	29	30	31

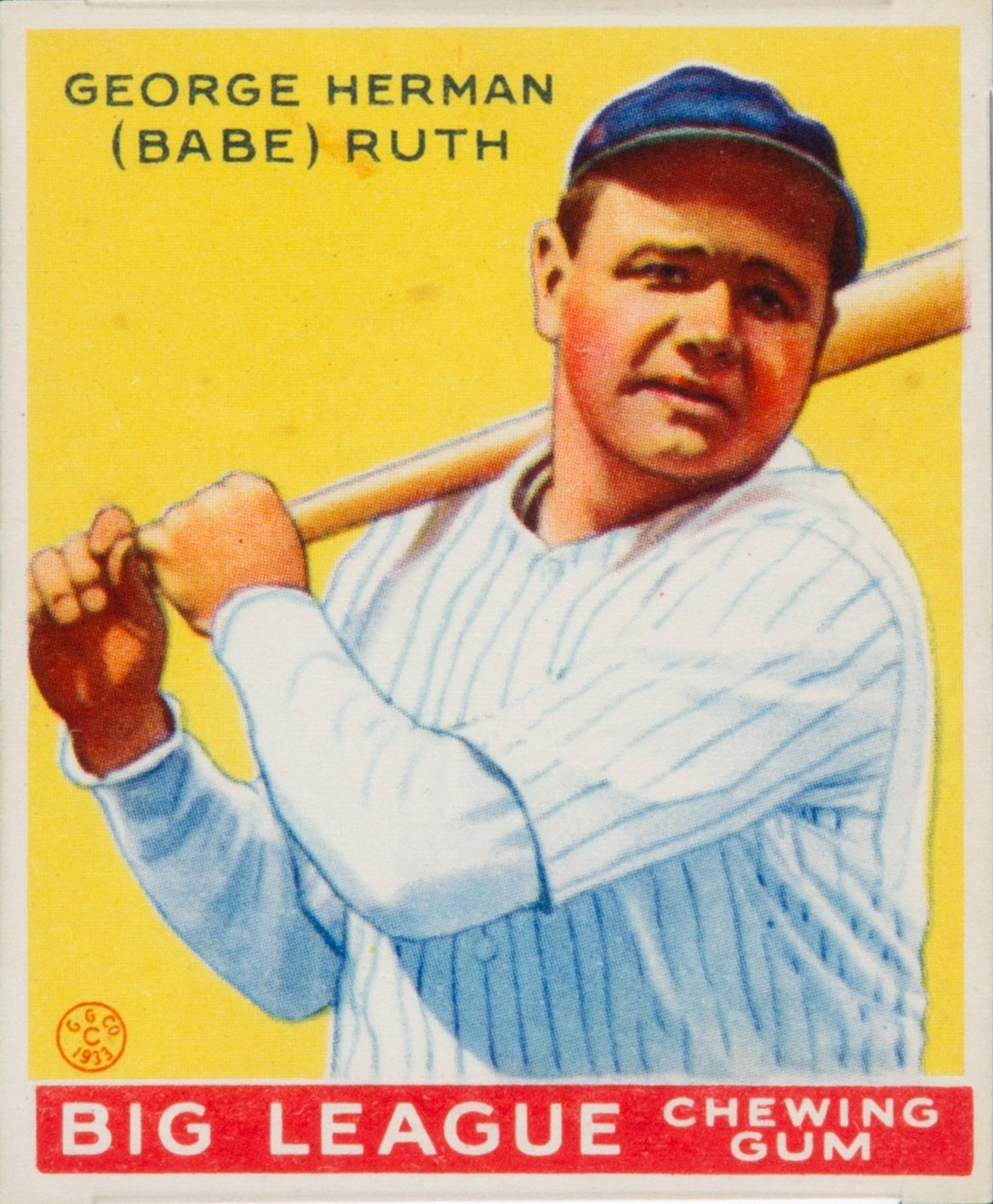
March 2, 1927: Babe Ruth signs for record salary

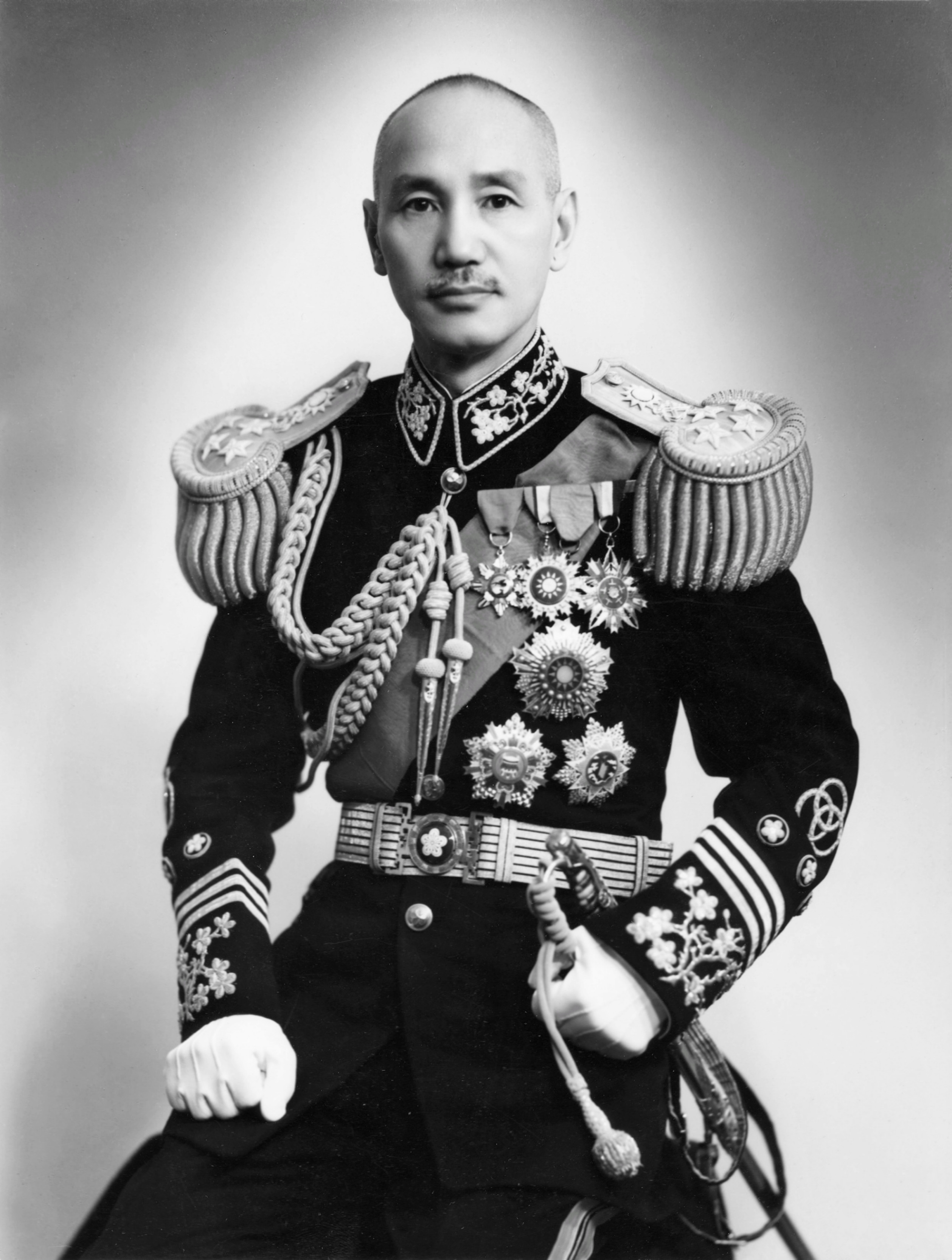
March 26, 1927: Chiang Kai-shek captures Shanghai

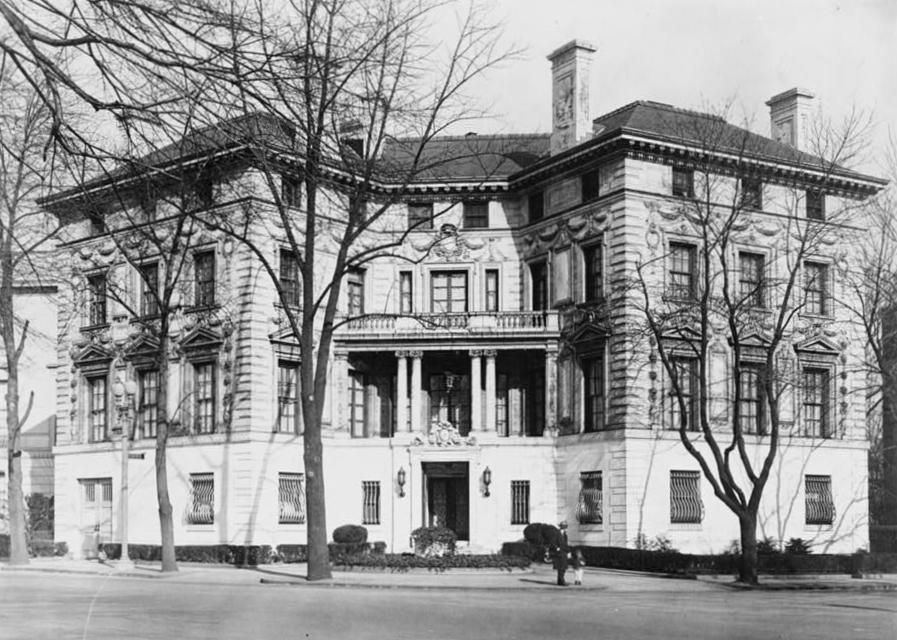
March 2, 1927: Coolidge and family move into U.S. presidential residence

The following events occurred in March 1927:

== March 1, 1927 (Tuesday) ==
- An explosion at a coal mine in Cwm, Wales, killed 52 miners.
- U.S. President Calvin Coolidge and his family spent their final night in the White House, which was set for six months of repairs on the roof and the upper floor. The following day, the family took up residence at the Patterson Mansion on 15 Dupont Circle, owned by Mrs. Ellinor Schlesinger. President Coolidge continued to use the executive offices at the White House.
- At Montevideo, Juan Campisteguy was inaugurated to a four-year term as the 25th President of Uruguay, succeeding José Serrato.
- Born:
  - Harry Belafonte, African-American singer (Day-O), in New York City (d. 2023)
  - Robert Bork, American judge, rejected candidate for the U.S. Supreme Court, in Pittsburgh (d. 2012)
- Died: George Polley, 28, American daredevil who climbed skyscrapers from the outside under the billing "The Human Fly". Polley, who had risked death on numerous occasions, died in Richmond, Virginia, during an operation at Memorial Hospital for a brain tumor.

== March 2, 1927 (Wednesday) ==
- Babe Ruth signed a new contract with the New York Yankees, calling for a then-record salary of $70,000 per year. The next best paid Yankee player was Herb Pennock, at $17,500
- The discovery, by teenagers Frank Horton Jr. and Leonard Taylor, of high grade gold ore in Nevada, set off a modern-day gold rush that attracted thousands of prospectors to the area. The town of Weepah, Nevada sprang up near Tonopah. Within three months, the rush was over, and the Weepah was almost totally deserted by August.

== March 3, 1927 (Thursday) ==
- A violent cyclone struck the island of Madagascar, with winds at more than 125 miles per hour (201 km/h). An 8-foot (2.4 m) high storm surge washed over the city of Tamatave, killing almost 600 people, and numerous ships in the harbor were driven inland.
- Archaeologist George Andrew Reisner and a group of explorers opened the tomb of Queen Hetepheres I, the mother of the builder of the Great Pyramid, and found that the sarcophagus was empty.
- Born: Pierre Aubert, President of Switzerland (Swiss Federal Council) in 1983 and 1987, in La Chaux-de-Fonds (d. 2016)
- Died: J. G. Parry-Thomas, 42, British auto racer, at Pendine Sands, while trying to set a new automobile speed record. Malcolm Campbell had broken Parry-Thomas' world record of 171.02 miles per hour (275.23 km/h) on February 4.

== March 4, 1927 (Friday) ==
- In South Africa, near Potchefstroom, the government permitted a race for the staking of claims for diamond mining at the Grasfontein farm. With the firing of a gun as a signal, 25,000 "peggers" (prospectors) "ran nearly three miles over hummocky broken ground, then set to work feverishly to stake as much of the best territory as possible".
- Born: Dick Savitt, American tennis player, in Bayonne, New Jersey; Wimbledon and Australian Open champion, 1951(d. 2023)
- Died: Ira Remsen, 81, American chemist, who in 1879 discovered saccharin by accident

== March 5, 1927 (Saturday) ==
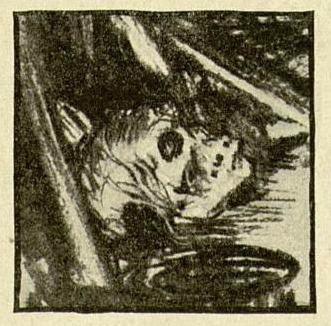
A skull out of place in "The Adventure of Shoscombe Old Place"

- "The Adventure of Shoscombe Old Place", the final Sherlock Holmes short story by Sir Arthur Conan Doyle, was published for the first time in Liberty magazine in the United States.
- Notre Dame defeated Creighton University, 31 to 17, to finish the 1926-27 college basketball season with a record of 19 wins and one loss. The Helms Athletic Foundation later recognized Notre Dame as the mythical national champion in a 1941 poll.
- General Motors introduced the LaSalle, a smaller and more maneuverable luxury automobile.

== March 6, 1927 (Sunday) ==
- At Battersea, Bertrand Russell delivered his famous address, "Why I Am Not a Christian".
- San Francisco police shot and mortally wounded Celsten Eklund, a known anarchist, and wounded another man as they attempted to light the fuse to a large dynamite bomb in front of the Saint Peter and Paul Catholic Church.
- Born:
  - William J. Bell, American TV producer, creator of The Young and the Restless and The Bold and the Beautiful, in Chicago (d. 2005)
  - Gordon Cooper, American astronaut on Mercury 9 (1963) and Gemini 5 (1965) (d. 2004)
  - Gabriel García Márquez, Colombian author, in Aracataca; author of One Hundred Years of Solitude, Nobel Prize in Literature laureate, 1982 (d. 2014)
  - Wes Montgomery, American jazz guitarist, in Indianapolis (d. 1968)

== March 7, 1927 (Monday) ==
- At 6:28 pm local time, an earthquake measuring 7.6 on the Richter magnitude scale struck on Japan's Tango Peninsula in the Kyoto Prefecture. The tremors and subsequent fires killed 3,020 people, and destroyed the cities of Toyooka and Kinosaki in the Hyōgo Prefecture.
- In the case of Nixon v. Herndon, the United States Supreme Court declared unconstitutional a Texas law that barred African-American voters from participating in primary elections, rendering similar laws in other states void. The victory was short-lived, as Texas passed a new law that gave political parties the right to set their own rules for participation in a party primary election. Such laws were not held unconstitutional until the April 1, 1946 ruling in Primus v. King.

== March 8, 1927 (Tuesday) ==
- The first downhill skiing race in the United States took place at Mount Moosilauke in New Hampshire, and was won by Charles N. Proctor of Dartmouth College.
- Singer Jimmie Rodgers, celebrated later as "The Father of Country Music", recorded his first hit single, The Soldier's Sweetheart.

== March 9, 1927 (Wednesday) ==
- Signed on September 25, 1926, the 1926 Slavery Convention, officially the Convention to Suppress the Slave Trade and Slavery, entered into force.
- A neutrality pact was signed between Latvia and the Soviet Union, but was not ratified. A subsequent, and weaker, non-aggression pact was finally signed on February 5, 1932. The Republic of Latvia was annexed by the Soviet Union in 1940.
- American balloonist Hawthorne C. Gray set an unofficial altitude record of 8,230 meters (27,000 feet) over Belleville, Illinois, but passed out in the thin air, regaining consciousness only after the balloon descended on its own. Gray would reach 12,945 meters on May 4, a record that would fail because he parachuted from the craft (at 3,830 m) landing. On November 4, he reached 12,192 meters but did not survive the trip.
- Adolf Hitler made his first public speech after the Bavarian government lifted a two-year ban against his participation in political events.

== March 10, 1927 (Thursday) ==
- Zenith Radio Corporation became the first company to obtain a license from RCA to manufacture radios, followed on May 18 by the Crosley Radio Corporation.

== March 11, 1927 (Friday) ==
- The first armored car robbery was committed by Paul Jaworski and the Flatheads Gang near Pittsburgh, Pennsylvania. The gang set off explosions to disable two cars that were transporting cash for the payroll for the Terminal Coal Company, and escaped with more than $104,000.
- In New York City, the Roxy Theater was opened by Samuel Roxy Rothafel. With 5,920 seats, it was the largest cinema built up to that time.
- PCJJ, the first shortwave radio station in Europe and the first dedicated shortwave radio station in the world officially went on air, broadcasting from the Netherlands.
- Born: Ron Todd, British trade union leader; President of TGWU 1985-92; in Walthamstow, London (d. 2005)

== March 12, 1927 (Saturday) ==
- The Kreta Ayer Incident in Singapore turned much of the Chinese community in the British colony against the colonial administration. Demonstrators, observing the anniversary of the death of Sun Yat-sen, were fired upon by police after stopping in front of a precinct station at Kreta Ayer, and six people were killed.
- Outside the Bolshoi Theatre in Moscow, an assassination attempt was made against Soviet Politburo member Nikolai Bukharin. The Soviets claimed that the failed crime had been the work of British intelligence agents, and a group of "counterrevolutionaries" were executed on June 9, 1927. In 1938, Bukharin himself was accused of plotting against the government and was executed.
- The adventure film The Beloved Rogue starring John Barrymore was released.
- Born: Emmett Leith, co-inventor of the hologram, in Ann Arbor (d. 2005)

== March 13, 1927 (Sunday) ==
- The leadership of the Kuomintang voted to fire Chiang Kai-shek from most of his executive positions, except for commander of expeditionary forces. Generalissimo Chiang ignored the demotion and, after capturing Shanghai two weeks later, took absolute control over the Kuomintang.
- Born:
  - Raúl Alfonsín, 49th President of Argentina (1983–89), in Chascomús, Buenos Aires (d. 2009)
  - Robert Denning, American interior designer (d. 2005)

== March 14, 1927 (Monday) ==
- Jigme Wangchuck was formally crowned as King of Bhutan, under the authority of the British protectorate.
- Igor Stravinsky finished the score for the opera Oedipus Rex.
- Died: Jānis Čakste, 67, first President of Latvia and in office since 1922; he was succeeded by Gustavs Zemgals

== March 15, 1927 (Tuesday) ==
- In Tokyo, the large Watanabe Bank failed a day after Finance Minister Naoharu Kataoka mistakenly said in a speech that the struggling bank had "at last collapsed" and depositors made a bank run, withdrawing their cash. Two other banks collapsed by the end of the week and by March 24, twelve banks had crashed and more would follow.
- Born: Carl Smith, American country musician, in Maynardville, Tennessee (d. 2010)

== March 16, 1927 (Wednesday) ==
- The Intelligent Woman's Guide to Socialism and Capitalism was completed by George Bernard Shaw.
- Born:
  - Vladimir Komarov, Soviet cosmonaut and first human to die during a space mission; in Orenburg (killed 1967 in re-entry of Soyuz 1)
  - Daniel Patrick Moynihan, U.S. Senator (D-N.Y.), 1977–2001; in Tulsa, Oklahoma (d. 2003)
  - Georges Séguy, leader of the France's CGT labour union; in Toulouse (d. 2016)

== March 17, 1927 (Thursday) ==
- As the Teapot Dome scandal continued to unravel, Harry F. Sinclair, owner of Mammoth Oil Company (later Sinclair Oil), was convicted by a jury of contempt of Congress. The multi-milloniare eventually served a six-month prison term in 1930. On the same day, President Coolidge issued an executive order returning administration of all naval petroleum reserves from the U.S. Department of Interior to the U.S. Department of the Navy.
- More than one hundred people died when the Chinese ship Chongfu was wrecked in the Yangtze River near Luzhou in the Sichuan Province.

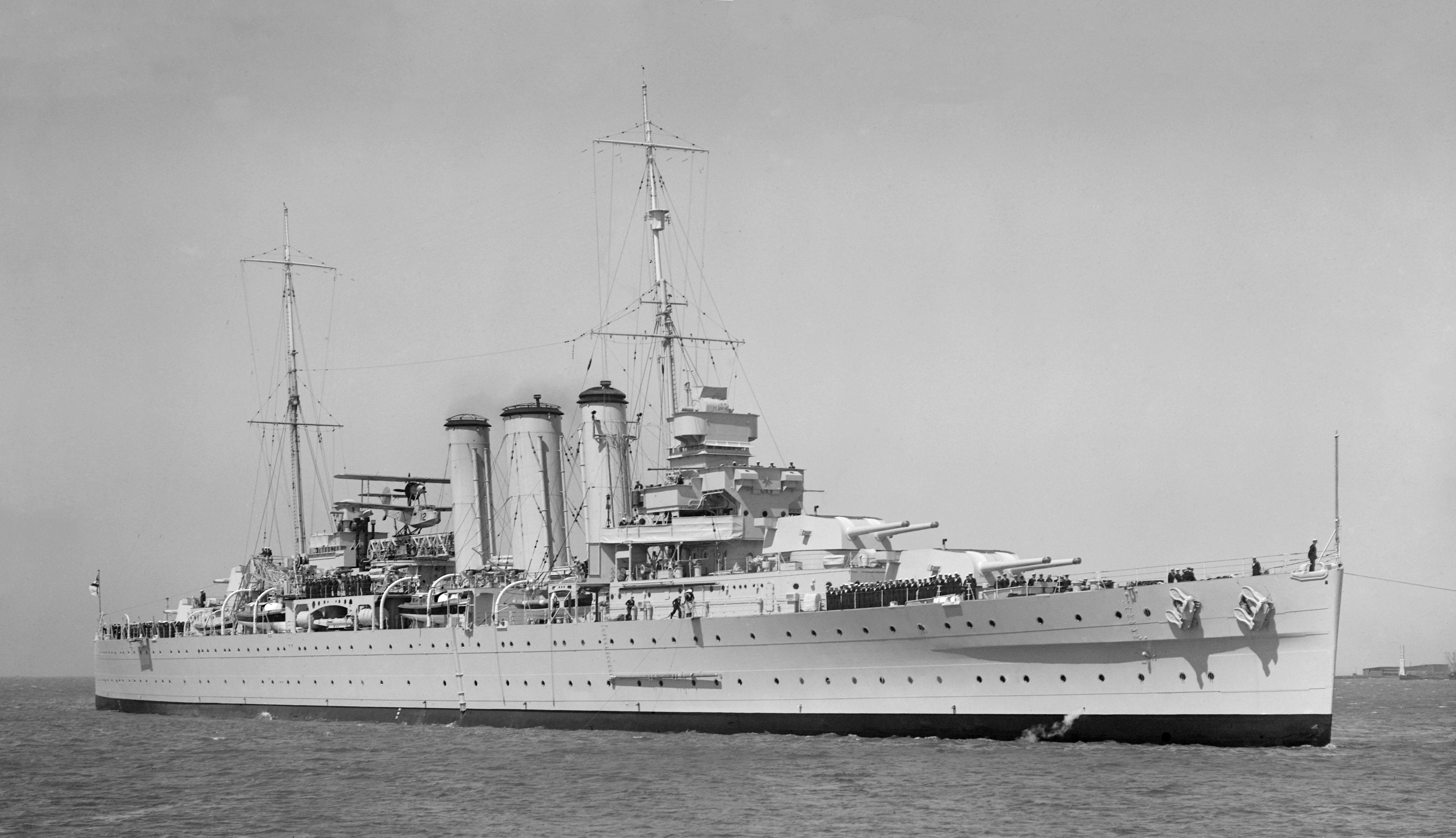
HMAS Australia

- The Royal Australian Navy cruiser HMAS Australia was launched at Clydesbank, Scotland. It would be commissioned in 1928.
- Born: Roberto Suazo Córdova, President of Honduras from 1982 to 1986 (d. 2018)
- Died: Charles Emmett Mack, 26, American silent film actor, in an auto accident

== March 18, 1927 (Friday) ==
- In the Northern Expedition in China, Generalissimo Chiang Kai-shek's Nationalist forces arrived at the defensive line protecting the city of Shanghai. Instead of defending against the enemy, the garrison commander collaborated with the Nationalists, as well as handing over the plans for city's defense. Though offered a position with Chiang's forces, the officer who betrayed his commander declined to work further with them. One author wrote later, "Stupidly, he went home to Shandong, where he was executed
- A tornado leveled the town of Green Forest, Arkansas, killing 16 people and injuring more than 50. In all, 26 people were killed in the storm.
- Born: George Plimpton, American sportswriter (Paper Lion), in New York City (d. 2003)

== March 19, 1927 (Saturday) ==
- Balto, the Siberian husky who would later become the subject of an animated 1995 film (Amblin Entertainment), was given a parade and a hero's welcome in Cleveland, along with six of his canine teammates (Fox, Sye, Billy, Tillie, Moctoc and Alaska Slim). Businessman George Kimble had rescued the animals, two years after the 1925 serum run to Nome, after finding that they were being neglected.
- Born:
  - Richie Ashburn, American MLB player and Hall of Fame enshrinee, at Tilden, Nebraska (d. 1997)
  - Allen Newell, pioneering computer programmer, in San Francisco (d. 1992)

== March 20, 1927 (Sunday) ==
- In Mahad, Dr. Babasaheb Ambedkar began a crusade for the end of discrimination against the Dalit caste in India, known commonly as "Untouchables".
- Albert Snyder, a 44-year-old art editor for the magazine Boating, was brutally murdered at his home on 222nd Street in Queens, New York, and his wife, Ruth Snyder, was discovered bound and gagged. A few days later, police arrested Ruth and her lover, Judd Gray, for Albert's murder. After their trial and conviction, Mrs. Snyder and Mr. Gray would both be executed on January 12, 1928.
- Born: John Joubert, British composer, in Cape Town, South Africa (d. 2019)

== March 21, 1927 (Monday) ==
- As the Nationalist Chinese troops of Chiang Kai-shek approached Shanghai during the Northern Expedition, Chinese Communist Party leader Zhou Enlai led the Shanghai Uprising to aid Generalissimo Chiang. A strike was called and 600,000 workers left their jobs. Rebels then seized police stations and armories, cut power and telephone lines, and obeyed Zhou's orders to not harm foreigners in the city.
- Born: Hans-Dietrich Genscher, Vice-Chancellor of West Germany and the nation's Foreign Minister from 1974 to 1990; following reunification with East Germany, Genscher would serve as Vizekanzler and Foreign Minister until May 17, 1992; in Reideburg (d. 2016)

== March 22, 1927 (Tuesday) ==
- At a meeting at the Biltmore Hotel in New York, Zionist leader Chaim Weizmann and a supporter from the Jewish community, attorney Louis Marshall, reached an agreement to fund a survey of Palestine and the "Holy Land". A commission headed by Lee Frankel delivered its report later in the year.
- Forty-three Russian peasants, on their way to church in Orenburg, drowned when their ferry boat sank.
- Died: Charles Sprague Sargent, 85, creator of the Arnold Arboretum in Boston.

== March 23, 1927 (Wednesday) ==
- After the troops supporting Shanghai's warlords retreated to Nanking, Nationalist troops pursued, and attacks on foreigners began. Six foreign residents, including Professor John E. Williams of Nanjing University, were killed.
- Died: Paul César Helleu, 67, French painter

== March 24, 1927 (Thursday) ==
- After six foreigners had been killed in Nanjing and it appeared that Kuomintang troops would overrun the foreign consulates at Nanjing, the American consul, John K. Davis, asked for military intervention. The American destroyers USS Noa and USS Preston, and the British cruiser HMS Emerald, fired shells into the Chinese city to clear the streets, then dispersed the attackers with gunfire.
- Born:
  - Martin Walser, German author, in Wasserburg am Bodensee (d. 2023)
  - Gerald D. Aurbach, American biochemist, in Cleveland (d. 1991)

== March 25, 1927 (Friday) ==
- The Japanese aircraft carrier Akagi was commissioned into the Imperial Japanese Navy. After taking part in the 1941 attack on Pearl Harbor, the Akagi was damaged and sunk six months later at the Battle of Midway.
- After a day of shelling Nanking, the United States and Britain agreed to a one-day ceasefire in return for the Kuomintang allowing the hundreds of foreigners in the city to be safely evacuated. Six foreigners, three of them British, had been killed by Chinese forces. Chinese histories estimate that there were more than 2,000 Chinese casualties from the bombardment. The French Communist newspaper Communite reported that 7,000 Chinese had been killed in the bombardment of Nanjing, while the U.S. State Department placed the total number of deaths and injuries "at less than 100".
- Born:
  - Bill Barilko, Canadian NHL player for Toronto Maple Leafs, in Timmins, Ontario (killed in plane crash, 1951)
  - Leslie Claudius, Indian field hockey star and three time Olympic gold medalist (d. 2012)

== March 26, 1927 (Saturday) ==
- Marshal Chiang Kai-shek, Commander in Chief of the Cantonese armies, captured Shanghai "without firing a shot", and arrived at the city on the gunboat Zhongshan, after sailing from Hankou. At the French Concession, Chiang met with local political and business leaders, who pledged their financial support if he would end his alliance with the Communists who had helped him gain control of the city.

== March 27, 1927 (Sunday) ==
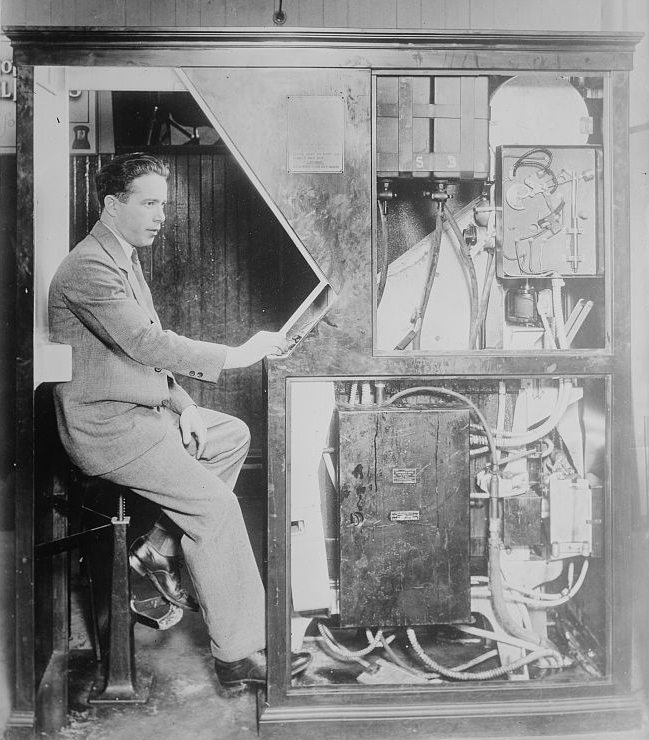
Josepho and the Photomaton booth

- Anatol Josepho, a 31-year-old Russian who had arrived in the United States penniless in 1925, became a millionaire with the sale of the rights to his invention, the photo booth, to the newly organized Photomaton Corporation.
- A fire started by an electric iron in a tailor's shop destroyed seven buildings in Glace Bay, Nova Scotia, damaged several more, and caused $350,000 in damages. The flames were fanned by a northeast blizzard, and leveled an entire block of buildings as firemen were unable to contain the blaze. It was the worst fire the town ever experienced with the losses approaching half a million dollars. The ornate Savoy Theatre building was destroyed, but the owner quickly rebuilt its replacement despite having less than half of the insurance needed.
- Henry Ford, at the time the world's wealthiest man, was hospitalized after he struck a tree. The auto magnate had been driving his coupe when it was run off the road by a larger Studebaker on Michigan Avenue in Detroit. Reports of the crash were kept from the press for several days and the matter was later investigated as "an attempted assassination", but the case was later dropped. Researcher Jim Morris concluded that the accident was the motivating reason for the inclusion of safety glass in all Ford automobiles thereafter.
- Born:
  - Mstislav Rostropovich, Russian cellist and conductor; in Baku, Azerbaijan SSR, USSR (d. 2007)
  - Anthony Lewis, Pulitzer Prize–winning journalist; in New York City (d. 2013)
- Died:
  - Joe Start, 84, American first baseman from 1871 to 1886
  - William Healey Dall, 81, American naturalist
  - Will H. Dilg, 56, American conservationist

== March 28, 1927 (Monday) ==
- The Majestic Theatre opened in New York with the production Rufus LeMaire's Affairs. The Broadway theatre would premiere numerous successful plays and musicals, including Carousel, South Pacific, The Music Man, Camelot, The Wiz, and Andrew Lloyd Webber's The Phantom of the Opera, which has played at the Majestic since 1988.
- Died: Alfred Klausmeyer, 66, co-founder and operator of the Anchor Buggy Company, which had been the world's largest manufacturer of horse-drawn carriages from 1887 until 1915.

== March 29, 1927 (Tuesday) ==
- Henry Segrave became the first person to drive a car at more than 200 miles per hour (320 km/h), reaching 203.79 miles per hour (327.97 km/h) in the 1,000-horsepower (750 kW) Sunbeam Mystery. Racing on the sands of Daytona Beach, Florida, Segrave broke Malcolm Campbell's world record, set in February 1927, by almost 30 miles per hour (48 km/h).
- Hubert Wilkins and Ben Eielson became the first people to make an airplane landing on a floating icepack, after having engine trouble. Landing in the Arctic Ocean, further north than any previous airplane had been, Wilkins and Eielson made their repairs and took off again, flew back south, made another forced descent onto ice, and had to hike ten more days across the ice to return to the shores of Barrow, Alaska.
- Born:
  - John McLaughlin, American political commentator (The McLaughlin Group), in Providence, Rhode Island (d. 2016)
  - John Robert Vane, British pharmacologist and 1982 Nobel Prize laureate, in Tardebigge, Worcestershire (d. 2004)

== March 30, 1927 (Wednesday) ==
- Following the worst financial panic in Japanese history, that nation's Diet passed an emergency banking law, the Ginko Ho, immediately increasing the amount of capital that banks were required to keep in reserve. As a result, the number of banks decreased over the next five years from 1,417 to 680 and Japan's five largest banks (Mitsui, Mitsubishi, Sumitomo, Yasuda and Dai-Ichi) doubled their share of the nation's deposits, from 17% to 31%.
- Coal mine explosions in Pennsylvania and Illinois killed five and eight miners respectively, but hundreds more were rescued the next day after being trapped underground. At Ehrenfeld, Pennsylvania, it appeared that nearly 500 miners had been trapped, but all but five came out the next day. An explosion the same day near Ledford, Illinois trapped 300 men, but all but 8 were saved.
- Died: Ladislas Lazaro, 54, U.S. Congressman (D-La.) since 1913

== March 31, 1927 (Thursday) ==
- At midnight, members of the United Mine Workers of America began a strike of American bituminous coal mines after the expiration of their 1924 contract with union mines, with 200,000 miners across the United States walking off of their jobs. Coal mining continued with strikebreakers, and the strike came to an end on July 18, 1928.
- Vladimir K. Zworykin received British Patent No. 255,057 for an all cathode ray television system. U.S. Patent No. 1,691,324 was issued on November 13, 1928.
- Born:
  - César Chávez, American labor leader, founder of United Farm Workers; in Yuma, Arizona (d. 1993)
  - William Daniels, American film and television actor (voice of KITT in Knight Rider; Dr. Mark Craig in St. Elsewhere); in Brooklyn (alive in 2026)
