= Boris Rtcheouloff =

Scientist and inventor

Boris Alexandrovich Rcheulov (born Boris Aleksandres dze Rcheulishvili; Georgian: ბორის ალექსანდრეს ძე რჩეულიშვილი; 10 August 1899 – 10 February 1942), also spelt Rtcheouloff, was a Georgian scientist, and the inventor of “videotape”. Early attempts to record television signals on magnetic material had started when Boris Rtcheouloff applied for a British patent on 4 January 1927 for a technique of recording television signals on 'a magnetic record of the Poulsen telegraphone type'. Sound would be recorded in sync on the reverse side. These ideas incorporated a way to record sound or pictures by causing a strip, disc, or cylinder of iron or other magnetic material to be magnetized. He did not pay the annual renewal fee, so his patent soon lapsed.

His godfather was the renowned opera singer Feodor Chaliapin.
