= Anchor Buggy Company =

Defunct American carriage and automobile manufacturer

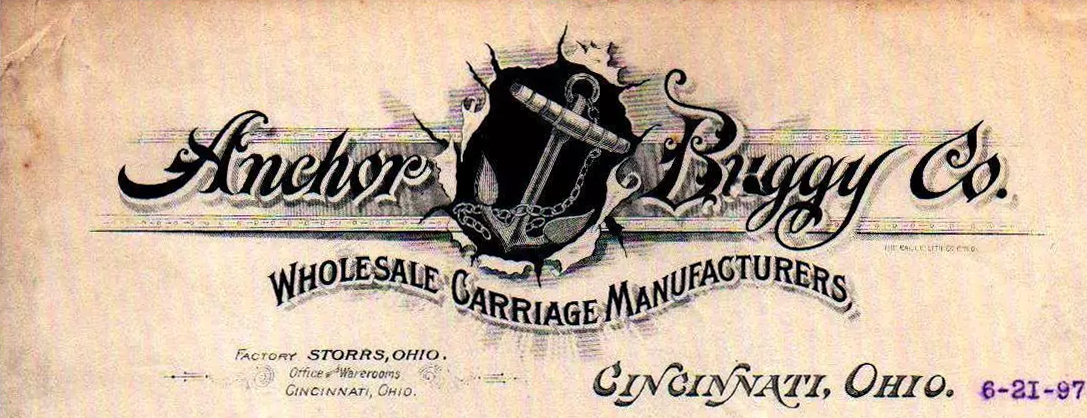
Anchor Buggy Co. letterhead (1897)

The Anchor Buggy Company was an American carriage manufacturer in Cincinnati, Ohio from 1886 to 1917. After 1917, it operated as the Anchor Top and Body Company till 1927.

The Anchor Carriage Company also had a short-lived automotive branch called the Anchor Motor Car Company (1910–1911).

== History ==
=== Anchor Buggy Co. ===
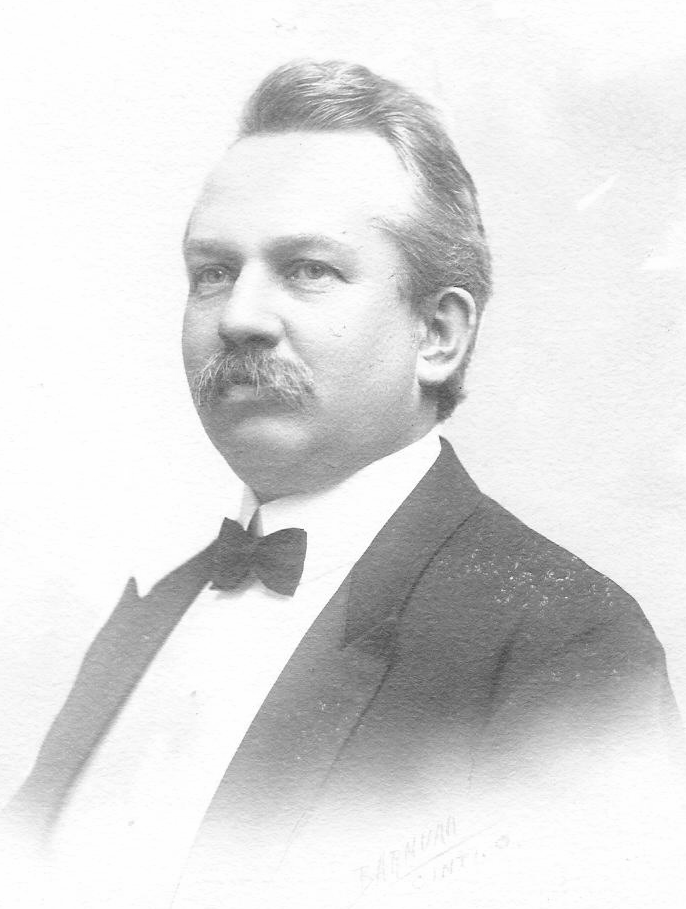
Portrait photograph of Alfred F. Klausmeyer

The Anchor Buggy Co. was founded between 1886 and 1887 by Alfred F. Klausmeyer and Anthony G. Brunsman, two former employees of Anderson & Harris Carriage Co.

Herman H. Uckotter was an inventor for the company, who invented a steering device called "the fifth wheel". The company had successfully applied a new principle in fifth wheels and attachments for carriages, with the gear being known to the trade as the "patent anchor fifth wheel and king-bolt".

Anchor was one of the largest carriage building companies in the region, and at its peak in 1897, manufactured 125 buggies, surreys and phaetons a day.

In later years, Anchor shared its production line with the Lion Buggy Co.; the combined firm was one of the first carriage manufacturers to set up a production line with each worker performing only one task. The firm is also credited with being the first to develop a process for painting wheels using centrifugal force.

==== Advertising ====
An 1890 advertisement for the Anchor Buggy Company featured the "My Wife and My Mother-in-Law" optical illusion; when viewed one way the image looked like a young woman, when viewed another way the image looked like an old woman.

In the late 1890s, Anchor built, what was claimed to be, the “Largest Buggy in the World”, to advertise their buggies at various fair and expositions across the Mid-West.

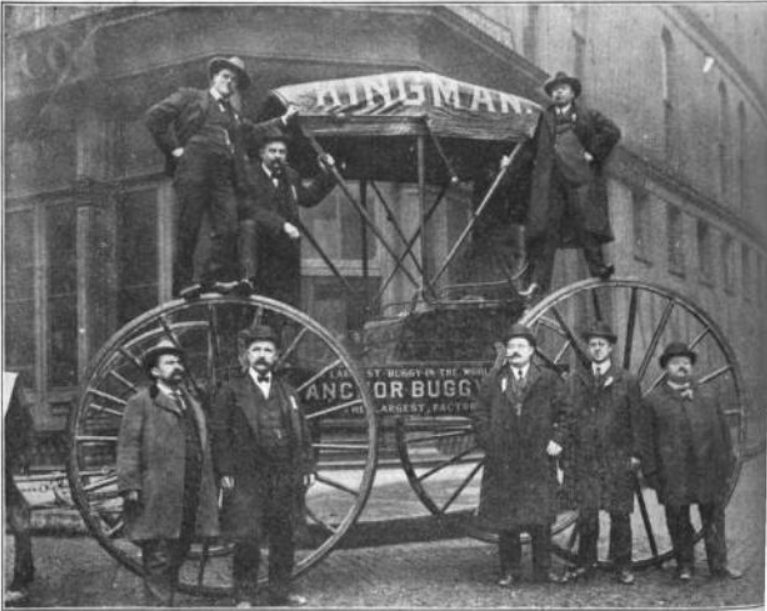
"Largest Buggy in the World" built by the Anchor Buggy Co., for themselves and the Kingman & Co. houses as an advertisement, 1903

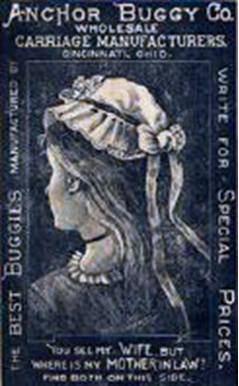
Ad for Anchor Buggy Co. with an optical illusion, 1890

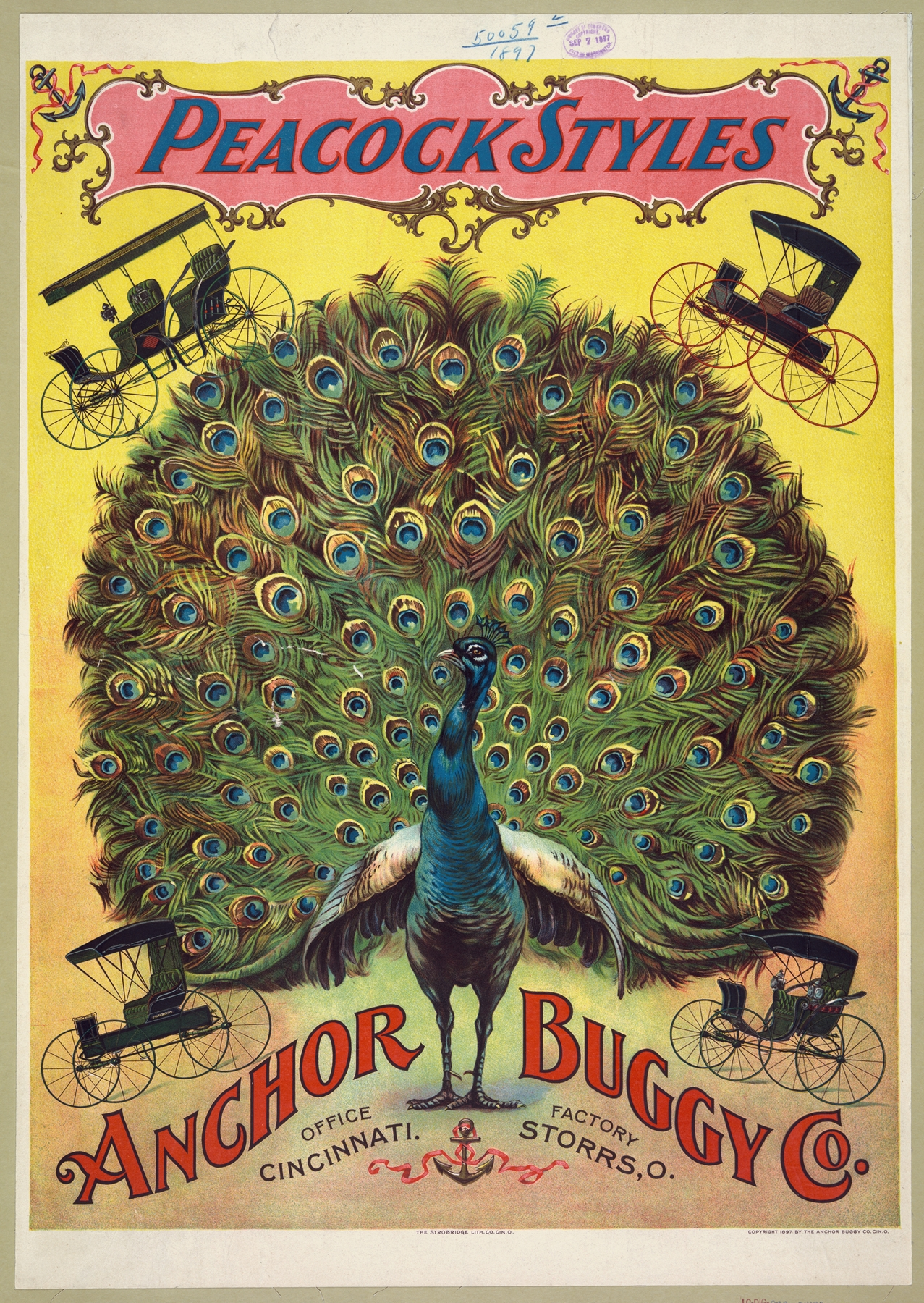
Advertisement poster for Anchor Buggy Co. by Strobridge & Co., 1897

=== Anchor Motor Car Company ===
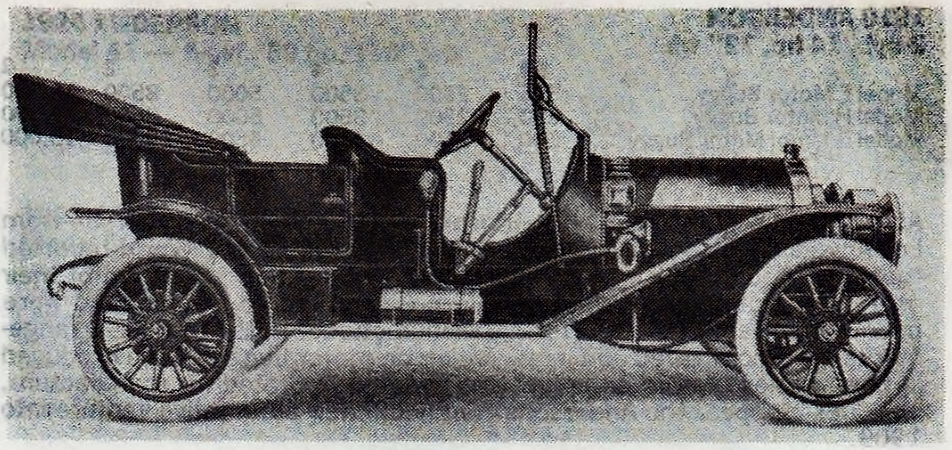
1910 Anchor

In 1910, Anchor was formally incorporated as a stock company, and the Anchor Motor Car Company was set up as an independent automobile division.

The first automobile made by the company was Anchor-35, a 5-passenger "touring car of modern design", with a 35–40 hp (28 tax hp) 4-cylinder engine, and a price tag of $1850.

But in 1911, after the death of Anchor's co-founder and president Anthony G. Brunsman, the series production of the automobile was shelved. While the automobiles were manufactured only from 1910 to 1911, they continued to be sold till at least 1916.

=== Anchor Top & Body Co. ===
In 1917, as buggy sales declined, Anchor began selling tops with windshields for Ford cars, and later for Dodge, Olds, Buick, and Oakland.

The company remained in business as the Anchor Top & Body Co. till 1927.

=== Anchor Buggy and Carriage Company ===
In 1958, Samuel W. Levinson, founder of the Stuart Manufacturing Company— that made children's night lights and toys— retired from his company, and established another one called the Anchor Buggy and Carriage Company.

From 1958 to 1964, the company created exact miniature plastic carriage models based on the carriages and buggies made by the original Anchor Buggy Company. Levinson had acquired permission from Anchor in 1935 to use their name.
