= William Fuld =

American businessman (1870–1927)

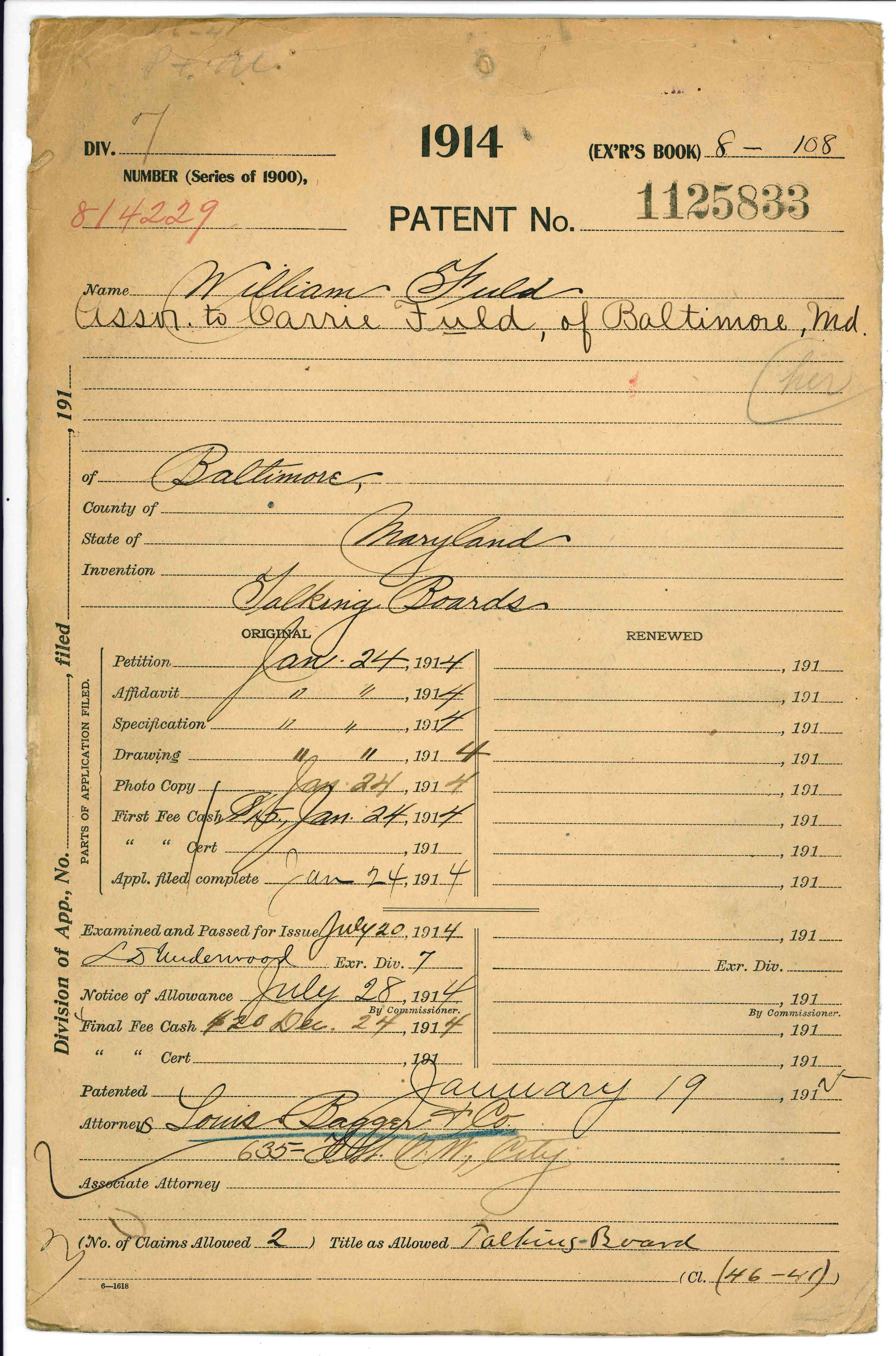
Patent Case File No. 1,125,833, Talking Boards, Inventor(s): William Fuld

William Fuld (July 24, 1870 – February 24, 1927) was an American businessman, inventor, and entrepreneur from Baltimore, Maryland who is best known for his marketing and manufacture of Ouija boards from the 1890s through the 1920s. Fuld is seen as the father of the Ouija board. Though Fuld never claimed to have invented the Ouija board, intense media coverage in the 1930s credited him with it. The misinformation was sustained by his own marketing, and his practice of stamping "Original Ouija Board" and "Inventor" on the back of his boards. By the end of his life he would have over 33 patents, trademarks, and copyrights credited to him.

== Background ==
William Fuld was one of ten children. By the age of 26, he was working as a customs inspector in his hometown of Baltimore. Fuld also worked as a varnisher which led to his job as foreman at the Kennard Novelty Co. which was founded on October 30, 1890, the same year that Elijah Bond filed the first patent for a “talking board”. This patent was assigned to William H. A. Maupin and Charles W. Kennard.

For reasons unknown Kennard was removed from his company in 1891. By 1892 Fuld had taken over as supervisor and the company changed its name to The Ouija Novelty Company and moved into a new location. William Fuld filed for his first talking board patent in the same year. Under the direction of Fuld, the company increased production of Ouija boards to meet the growing demand and thwarted many of Kennard's attempts to manufacture other talking boards.

In 1898, William and his brother Isaac went into business together under the name Isaac Fuld & Brother, leasing the "Ouija" name from The Ouija Novelty Company. In addition to talking boards, the brothers also manufactured pool tables and other billiards accessories. William was the first person to file a trademark for the term "Return Pool" table.

By 1901, the brothers' partnership had ended in a bitter feud. William Fuld changed the name of his company to the William Fuld Manufacturing Company. Going against an injunction, Isaac continued to manufacture talking boards under the name "Oriole" that were exact replicas of the boards that he and his brother had made. William sued his brother in a case that remained open until 1919.

William Fuld’s first talking board trademark, "Oracle", was filed in 1902. A crafty businessman, Fuld sued companies whose talking boards infringed on his trademarks or patents. It cannot be said whether or not he actually took himself seriously. However his numerous publicity stunts made the talking board a very successful product for Fuld, claiming in 1920 that the Ouija board had made him more than $1 million in profit.

In order to combat the growing competition for other talking board manufacturers, Fuld knew that if he himself made a cheaper version of his own product he would get more business. In 1919, he introduced the "Mystifying Oracle", an exact replica of his Ouija board that sold for less money. He also launched a line of trademarked Ouija jewelry and Ouija Oil for rheumatism. Fuld also trademarked the names "Egyptian Luck board", "Hindu Luck board" and "WE-JA" as well as a trademark detailing the way the word "Ouija" would be displayed.

== Death ==
William Fuld was a presbyterian and became a member of the Baltimore General Assembly in 1924. On February 24, 1927, Fuld climbed to the roof of his three-story factory to supervise the installation of a flagpole. When the rail against which he was leaning gave way, Fuld fell to the ground below. While being transported, a fractured rib pierced his heart and William Fuld died at the hospital.

After his death, Fuld's children took over the company. Catherine and William A. Fuld ran the company until the youngest brother, Hubert, became president of William Fuld, Inc., in 1942. Parker Brothers acquired the company and all of its assets in 1966.
