= Teddy Wakelam =

British Army officer, English rugby union player & broadcaster

Lieutenant-Colonel Henry Blythe Thornhill Wakelam TD (8 May 1893 – 10 July 1963), known as Teddy Wakelam, was an English sports broadcaster and rugby union player who captained Harlequin F.C.

== Early life ==
Wakelam was born in Hereford. During his school days he developed a love for a wide variety of sports. While studying history at Pembroke College, Cambridge he joined Harlequins in 1911. During World War I he served in the Royal Fusiliers, the London Regiment and the Royal Field Artillery, seeing service in France, Gallipoli, Egypt and Palestine. After the war he rejoined Harlequins. In 1924 he had to retire from rugby union due to a knee injury.

== Broadcaster ==
On 15 January 1927 Wakelam gave the first ever running sports commentary on BBC Radio. It covered the Rugby International match between England and Wales at Twickenham. England won 11–9. While Wakelam described the run of play, the background voice of Cecil Arthur Lewis would call out a number (this referred to a specific area on the pitch). To assist listeners, a picture showing a rugby field divided into numbered squared was published in the Radio Times. It is believed the British phrase "Back to Square One" (meaning to restart something) originates from this practice.

A week after his broadcasting debut on rugby he and C.A. Lewis provided the first sports commentary of a football match on British radio. The game, which was Arsenal - Sheffield United, finished as a 1–1 draw. In the same year he covered cricket and Wimbledon. In the mid-1930s he accidentally set fire to his notes while commentating on the tennis but kept going as if nothing had happened.

In June 1938, Wakelam became one of the first sports commentators on BBC television covering the England v Australia second test match at Lord's Cricket Ground in London. Although he commentated on other sports like boxing, his speciality remained rugby union.

Wakelam also covered non-sporting events like Tidworth Tattoo. He also worked as a rugby correspondent for The Morning Post and wrote a number of books including the Harlequin Story (1954) about the history of his old club. He died in Colchester at the age of 70.

Only a handful of his commentaries using the "squares" system have survived. English journalist, author and cricket commentator, John Arlott called him "a natural talker with a reasonable vocabulary, a good rugby mind and a conscious determination to avoid journalese."
