= 1905 Morris Park 5 =

Auto race

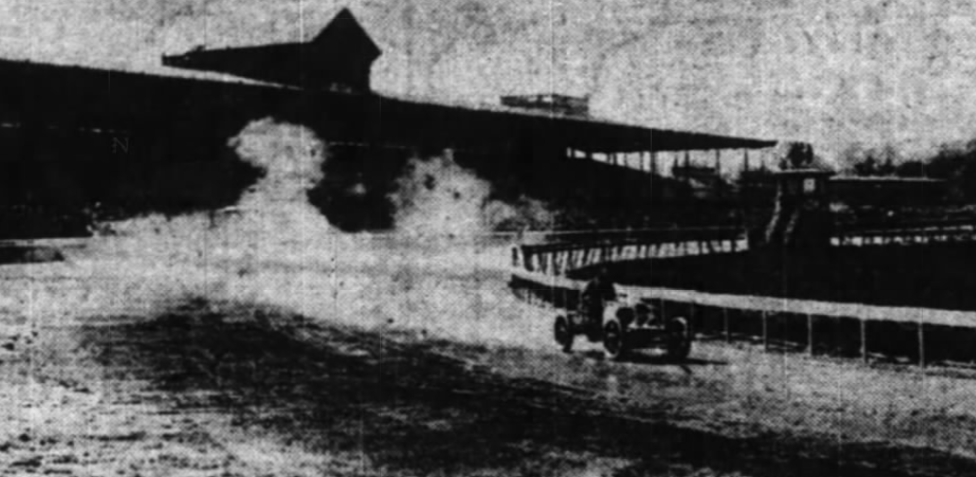
Racing around the lower turn of the Morris Park track during the day's races

The 1905 Morris Park 5 was the first race in the debut national motor car championship held by the American Automobile Association. It was contested at the Morris Park Racecourse, in the Bronx, New York around a 1.39 miles (2.24 km) dirt oval. The cars completed three-and-a-half laps for a distance of 5 miles (8.0 km) in total on June 10, 1905. The race was won by Louis Chevrolet in a 90-horsepower Fiat.

== Format ==
The championship race featured three-and-a-half laps of the dirt oval track at Morris Park Racecourse, to total 5 miles (8.0 km). The track, converted from a horse racing course, was 1.39 miles (2.24 km) long, and loosely egg shaped; with the corner at one end being tighter than the other. Entries were open to drivers of any nationality, and the race was not handicapped. Prize money was awarded to the first two drivers; the winner collected $150, while the runner-up gained $60. Points for the national motor car championship would also be awarded; four points to the winner, two points to second place, and a single point to the driver in third.

== Background ==
It was expected that the championship race would attract a field of famous racing drivers; The Philadelphia Inquirer listed Barney Oldfield, Charles Basle, Henry Ford, Webb Jay and George C. Cannon as probable entrants just over a week before the race, though none of the five eventually took part in the event.

== Race ==
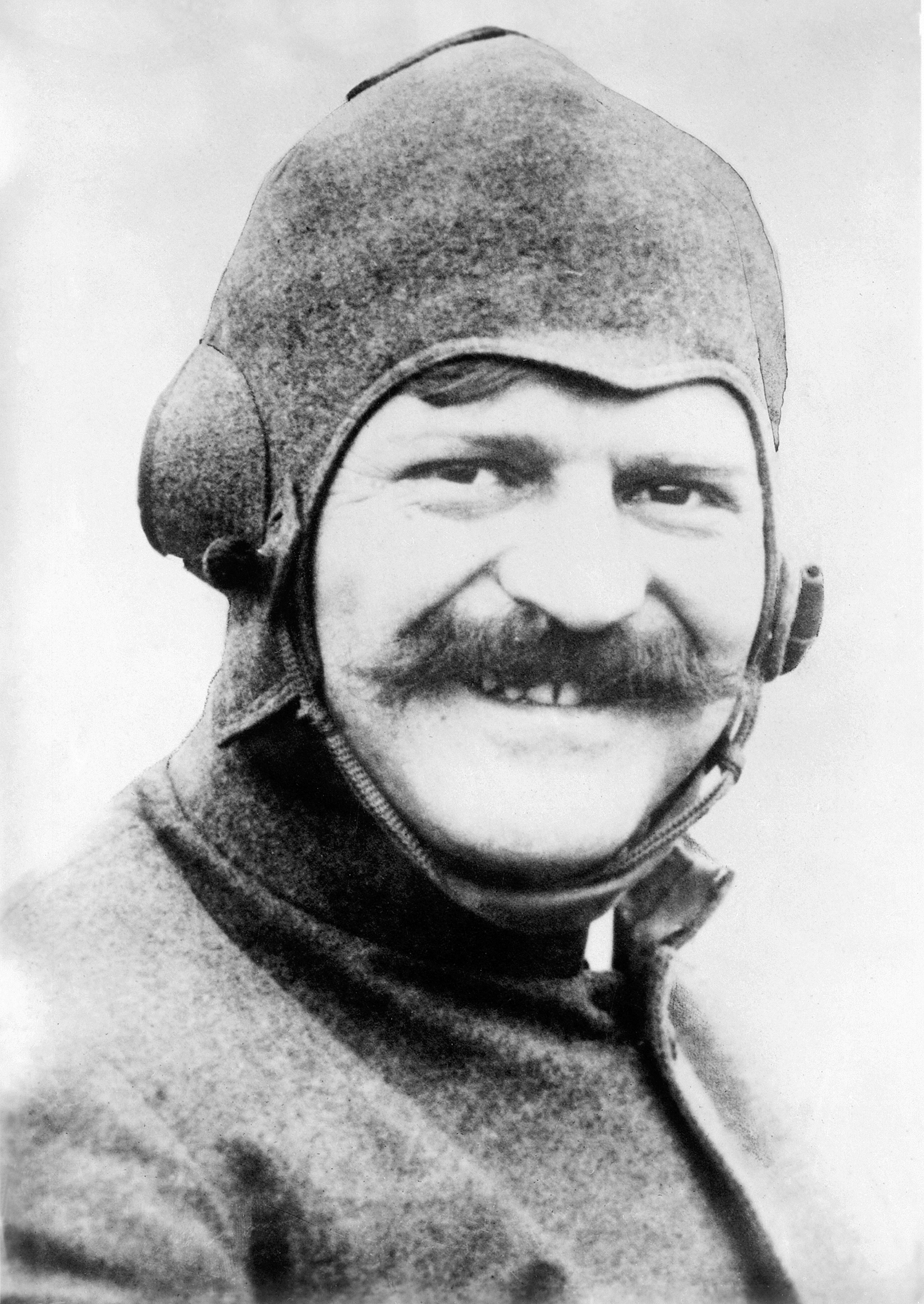
Louis Chevrolet (pictured in 1914) won the race

There were just four entries in the five-mile race, which was an open to all categories without any handicapping. Major C. J. S. Miller, in his Renault, was unable to start the race due to a gasoline feed failure. The remaining three cars started on the back straight. Louis Chevrolet led the race from start to finish in the 90-horsepower Fiat, which was significantly more powerfully that his rivals; Guy Vaughan was racing in a 40-horsepower Decauville, while Dan Wurgis had a 32-horsepower Reo Bird. By the time they passed the grandstand for the first time, Chevrolet already led by 200 yards (180 m), and he extended that to 440 yards (400 m) on the second lap. Chevrolet completed the race in 4 minutes and 48 seconds. Vaughan was second for most of the race, holding a lead of around 60 yards (55 m) ahead of Wurgis, but as they started the final lap, he dropped away and coasted to a stop on the back straight with a broken gasoline feed pipe. Wurgis finished in second in 5 minutes and 30 seconds.

=== Race result ===
Pos.	Driver	Car (hp)	Laps	Time/Retired	Points
1	Louis Chevrolet	Fiat (90)	3.5	4:48.8	4
2	Dan Wurgis	Reo Bird (32)	3.5	5:30.0	2
3	Guy Vaughan	Decauville (40)	2	Gasoline feed	1
4	C. J. S. Miller	Renault	DNS, gasoline feed		0

== Other events ==
The five-mile race was part of a day of races and time trials at the Morris Park Racecourse. The day began with Chevrolet attempting to break the world record for the fastest mile with a flying start. Using the same car as the previous record had been set in, owned by Major C. J. S. Miller. He completed one lap to get up to speed, and then began his timed attempt on the back straight. Despite having to shut the power off completely around the corners, Chevrolet improved on his previous time, setting a new record of 52.2 seconds, shaving three-fifths of a second off the old record.
