= Milwaukee Mile =

Race track in West Allis, Wisconsin, United States

America's Legendary Oval The Mile

- Paved Oval (1954–present)
- Location: Wisconsin State Fair Park; 640 S. 84th St; West Allis, Wisconsin, United States; 53214
- Coordinates: 43°01′12″N 88°00′36″W
- Capacity: Approx. 37,000
- Owner: State of Wisconsin
- Operator: Wisconsin State Fair Park
- Broke ground: 29 September 1899; 126 years ago
- Opened: 11 September 1903; 122 years ago
- Construction cost: $150 million (USD)
- Former names: Wisconsin State Fair Park Speedway (1949–1989); Wisconsin State Fair Speedway (1903–1948)
- Major events: Current: IndyCar; Milwaukee Mile 250 (2004–2009, 2011–2015, 2024–present); Indy NXT; Milwaukee 100 (1986–2001, 2004–2009, 2011–2015, 2024–present); Former: NASCAR Craftsman Truck Series; LiUNA! 175 (1995–2009, 2023–2024); ARCA Menards Series; Sprecher 150 (1982–1983, 2005–2007, 2021–2024); NASCAR O'Reilly Auto Parts Series; NorthernTool.com 250 (1984–1985, 1993–2009); Can-Am (1987); USAC Stock Car; Milwaukee 200 (1960–1980); NASCAR Midwest Series (2001, 2005); Atlantic Championship (1988, 1993–2004); Barber Pro Series (2003); ASA National Tour (1998–2000, 2004); X-1R Pro Cup Series (1997, 2008); NASCAR Southeast Series (1993–1994)
- Website: milwaukeemileracing.com

Paved Oval (1954–present)
- Surface: Asphalt
- Length: 1.015 mi (1.633 km)
- Turns: 4
- Banking: Turns: 9.25° Straights: 2.5°
- Race lap record: 0:21.519 ( (United States) Scott Pruett, Reynard 97I, 1998, CART)

Infield Road Course (1955–present)
- Surface: Asphalt
- Length: 1.800 mi (2.897 km)
- Turns: 10

Original Dirt Oval (1903–1953)
- Surface: Dirt
- Length: 1.000 mi (1.609 km)
- Turns: 4

The Milwaukee Mile is a 1.015 mi (1.633 km) oval race track at the Wisconsin State Fair Park in West Allis, Wisconsin, United States, a suburb west of Milwaukee. Opened in 1903 as a dirt track, it is the oldest operating motor speedway in the world. Inside the main track, the infield holds a 1.8 mi (2.9 km) road circuit. Its grandstand and bleachers seat about 37,000 spectators.

The Milwaukee Mile has hosted at least one auto race every year since its founding except during U.S. involvement in World War II. The track has held events sanctioned by major bodies, such as the AAA, USAC, NASCAR, CART/CCWS, and the IndyCar Series. There have also been many races in regional series such as ARTGO.

Famous racers who have won at the track include: Barney Oldfield, Ralph DePalma, Rex Mays, Ted Horn, Johnny Mantz, Norm Nelson, Rodger Ward, Marshall Teague, Frank Mundy, Don White, Parnelli Jones, Paul Goldsmith, A. J. Foyt, Gordon Johncock, Mario Andretti, Al Unser, Jim Clark, Alan Kulwicki, Rick Mears, Tom Sneva, Michael Andretti, Nigel Mansell, Juan Pablo Montoya, Dario Franchitti, Kurt Busch, and Tony Kanaan.

On December 16, 2009, Wisconsin State Fair Park officials confirmed that the Milwaukee Mile would host no NASCAR or IndyCar races in 2010. NASCAR confirmed that their June Nationwide Series date would remain in Wisconsin for 2010, as they announced they would hold a race at Road America for the first time since the Grand National Series raced there in 1956. NASCAR also announced on January 20, 2010, that the Milwaukee date for the truck series would be moved to August. The track hosted two ASA Late Model Series races in 2010.

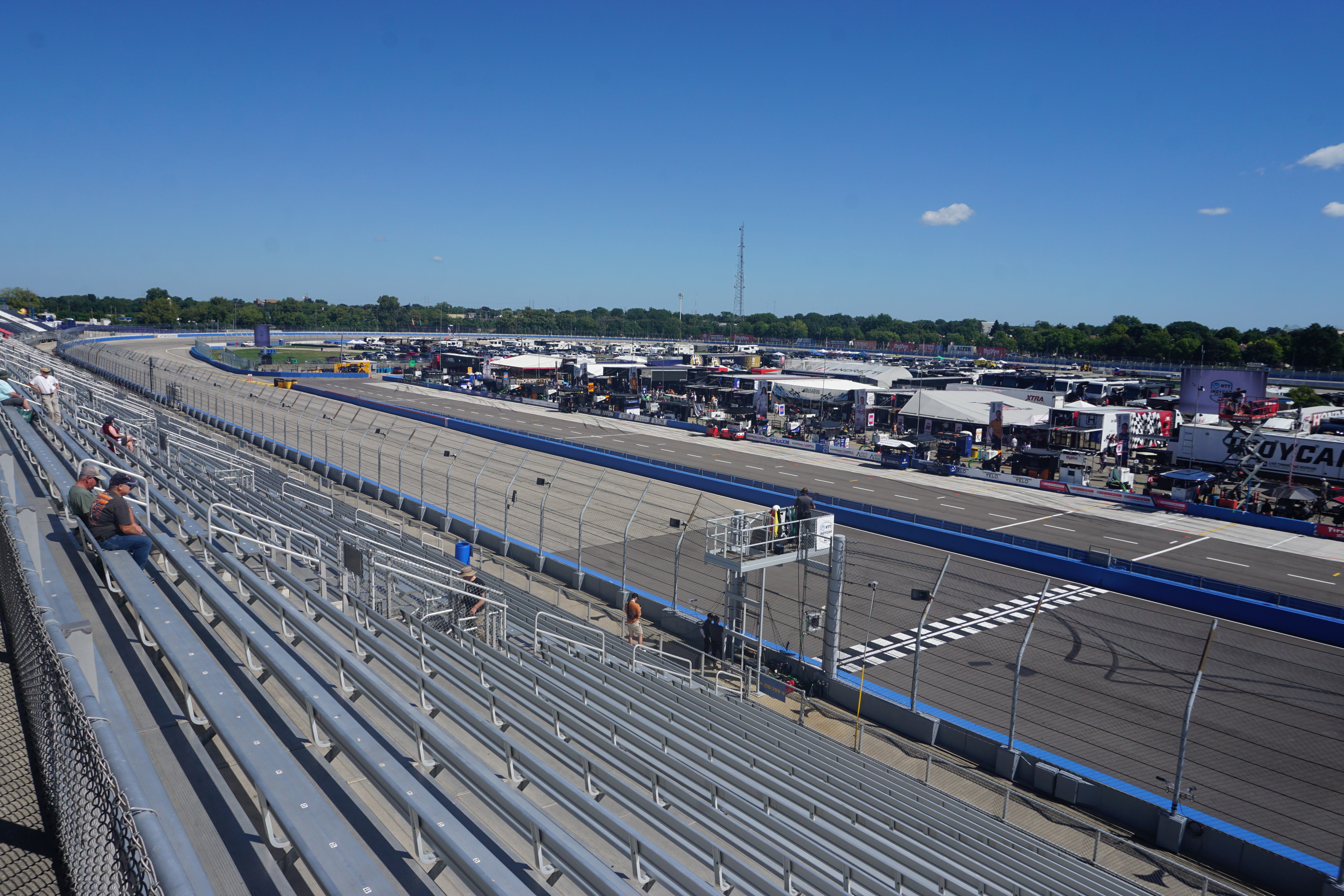
Milwaukee Mile in 2024

IndyCar returned to the track in 2011, but the Mile was left off the preliminary 2012 schedule after a poorly attended 2011 event that resulted in part from an inexperienced promoter. In February 2012, it was announced that IndyCar would return to the Mile on the weekend of June 15–16. The event was promoted by Andretti Sports Marketing, owned by former Indy driver Michael Andretti, and was billed as the Milwaukee IndyFest. The event included open-wheel racing featuring the IndyCar Series and the Firestone Indy Lights, as well as a driver question period and autograph sessions, music and other attractions. The series again left after the 2015 season when Andretti Sports Marketing went out of business. The track hosted no major professional races until ARCA returned in 2021. The NASCAR Craftsman Truck Series returned in 2023 but both the Truck Series and ARCA left in 2025. IndyCar returned to the track in 2024.

== Dirt track history ==
The track was a one mile (1.6 km) private horse-racing track by 1876. In 1891, the site was purchased by the Agricultural Society of the State of Wisconsin to create a permanent site for the Wisconsin State Fair.

The first motorsports event was held on September 11, 1903. William Jones of Chicago won a five lap speed contest, and set the first track record with a 72-second, 50 mph (80 km/h) lap. There were 24-hour endurance races in 1907 and 1908. Louis Disbrow won the first 100-mile (160 km) event in 1915, averaging 62.5 mph (100.6 km/h).

Barney Oldfield's success at the Mile helped make him a legend. He set the track record in 1905 and raised his speed in 1910 to 70.159 mph (112.910 km/h) in his "Blitzen Benz". In 1911, Ralph DePalma won the first Milwaukee Mile Championship car race, four years before his Indianapolis 500 win. Oldfield drove a gold car built by Harry Miller that completely enclosed the driver (called the "Golden Submarine"), and in June 1917, he beat DePalma in a series of 10 to 25 mi (16 to 40 km) match races.

The July 17, 1933, race was rained out. Wilbur Shaw and the other drivers convinced the track promoters to run the race the following day and the term "rain date" was born.

Huge new grandstands were installed in the 1930s, with seating for 14,900 people. They replaced the original grandstands that had been built in 1914. A roof was placed over the grandstands in 1938. These grandstands stood until new aluminum grandstands were installed in September 2002.

The 1939 race was the first AAA Championship race.

The 1937 non-championship AAA event was best known for running 96 laps (instead of 100) due to a scoring error. It was won by Rex Mays, who continued his domination throughout the 1940s by winning in 1941 and the next race (after World War II) in 1946.

The tradition of hosting the "race after the Indianapolis 500" began in 1947. This tradition was famously referenced in the 1969 movie Winning where Robert Wagner's character delivered the line "Everybody goes to Milwaukee after Indianapolis".

The Milwaukee Mile held more national championship midget, stock, and Indy car races than any other track in the country between 1947 and 1980.

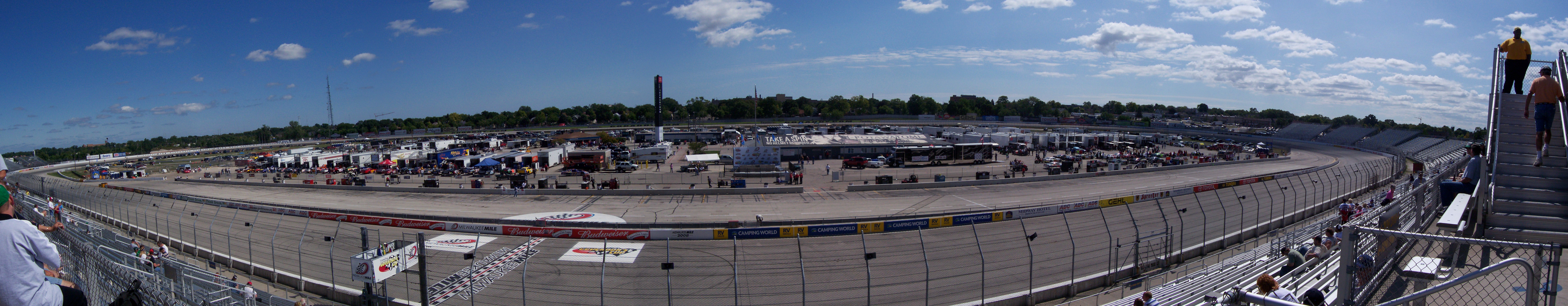
2008 panorama with aluminum grandstands

== Open wheel ==
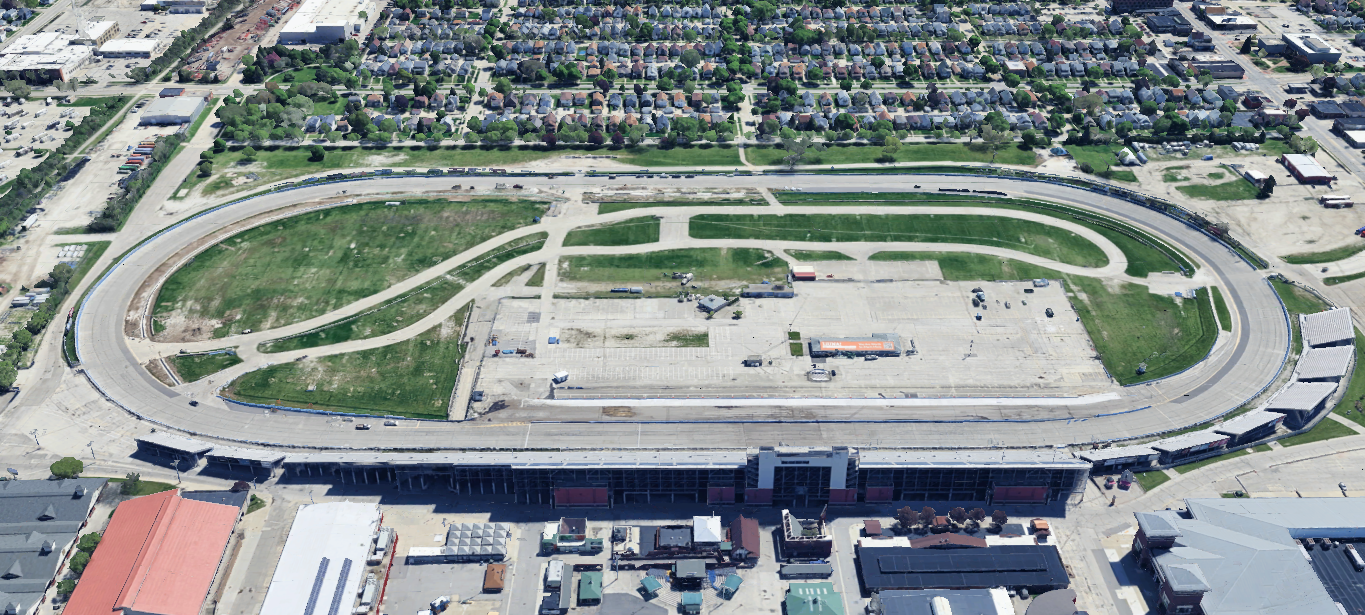
Satellite image of Milwaukee Mile (April 2024)

In 1954, the 1-mile (1.6 km) track was paved, and an infield road course was created. The 1/4-mile dirt infield track was kept for weekly programs during the 1950s and 1960s.

In 1963, Jim Clark drove his Lotus-Ford to the first victory for a rear-engined Indy Car.

In 1964, A. J. Foyt dominated in what was to be his penultimate race in a roadster. The rear-engine began dominating races in the 1960s, replacing the front-engine roadster, but not before one unexpected race. In 1965. A. J. Foyt had to tow his front-engine backup dirt car from Springfield because his primary car and crew would not make it to Milwaukee in time for qualifying. He prepared the car himself for pavement, and put the car on the pole with a speed of 107.881 mph (173.618 km/h). He led for 16 of 200 laps, and finished second.

In 1965. Gordon Johncock scored his first career Indy Car win at the Milwaukee Mile.

The track was repaved before the 1967 season. By 1967, both the 0.250 mi (0.402 km) dirt track and 0.500 mi (0.805 km) mile road course were closed to accommodate the pit area. Lloyd Ruby swept both USAC races held at Milwaukee in 1968, giving him three wins at the Mile including his first win there in 1961. The June 1968 Rex Mays 150 was a tragic affair as a three-car crash and ensuing inferno killed Ronnie Duman.

In the 1983 CART race, Tom Sneva finished first by 10 seconds. Post race inspection found an improper ground clearance on the side mount skirts, so second-place finisher Al Unser was given the win. On appeal, the decision was overturned, and Sneva was awarded the win two weeks later. Sneva would repeat the win one year later in a new 200 mile race.

The last sports car race was held on the infield road course on June 16, 1984. The track had deteriorated. It was repaved before October 2004. The course still hosts club road races sanctioned by the Midwestern Council of Sports Car Clubs.

In the 1985 CART event, Mario Andretti won the pole on his way to his fourth career track win. His son Michael won the next two races in 1986 and 1987. Milwaukee was also the site of Mario Andretti's first ever paved oval track win in Indy Car racing in 1966.

Al Unser Jr. won the 1990 CART race after Michael Andretti ran out of fuel with two laps to go. The victory was Unser Jr's first IndyCar win on an oval and was the ninth for the Unser family (father Al Unser Sr. and uncle Bobby Unser each have four).

The 1991 CART event, however, was dominated by their archrival Andretti family. For the first time in the worldwide history of auto racing, three members of the same family finished 1–2–3. Michael Andretti won the race, second went to his cousin John, and third to his father Mario. Michael's brother Jeff finished 11th.

Milwaukee was in danger of losing its CART date in 1992. To save the date, the fair board hired Carl Haas to organize all track activities.

The 1992 CART event was again won by Michael Andretti. In 1993, reigning Formula One champion Nigel Mansell got his first oval track win on his way to winning the CART championship. In 2000, Juan Pablo Montoya gave Toyota its first CART win. History was made again when in 2004 Ryan Hunter-Reay led all 250 laps to the victory. The final Champ Car race was held in 2006, with eventual champion Sébastien Bourdais winning.

The Indy Racing League IndyCar Series came to the Mile in 2004. Dario Franchitti won the inaugural event. His team, Andretti Autosport has won three races at the Mile with Tony Kanaan winning in 2006 and 2007. The other races have been won by Penske Racing drivers Sam Hornish Jr. in 2005, Ryan Briscoe in 2008, and Chip Ganassi Racing driver Scott Dixon in 2009. After a one-year absence from Milwaukee, Franchitti won in the series' return to the track in 2011, for Ganassi. After promoter conflicts in late 2015, it was announced that the series would not return for the following season. After an eight-year hiatus, the IndyCar Series returned for a doubleheader in 2024.

== Stock car racing ==
=== AAA/USAC sanction ===
The Milwaukee Mile was for decades the site of the most important races on the AAA, and later USAC, stock car racing calendar. The first AAA race was held on July 9, 1950, and was won by local racer Myron Fohr. After the AAA ended competition in 1955, following seasons were sanctioned by USAC. Don White, the all-time winner in AAA/USAC Stock Car history, holds the most victories in stock car competition at the Mile with 14.

=== NASCAR sanction ===
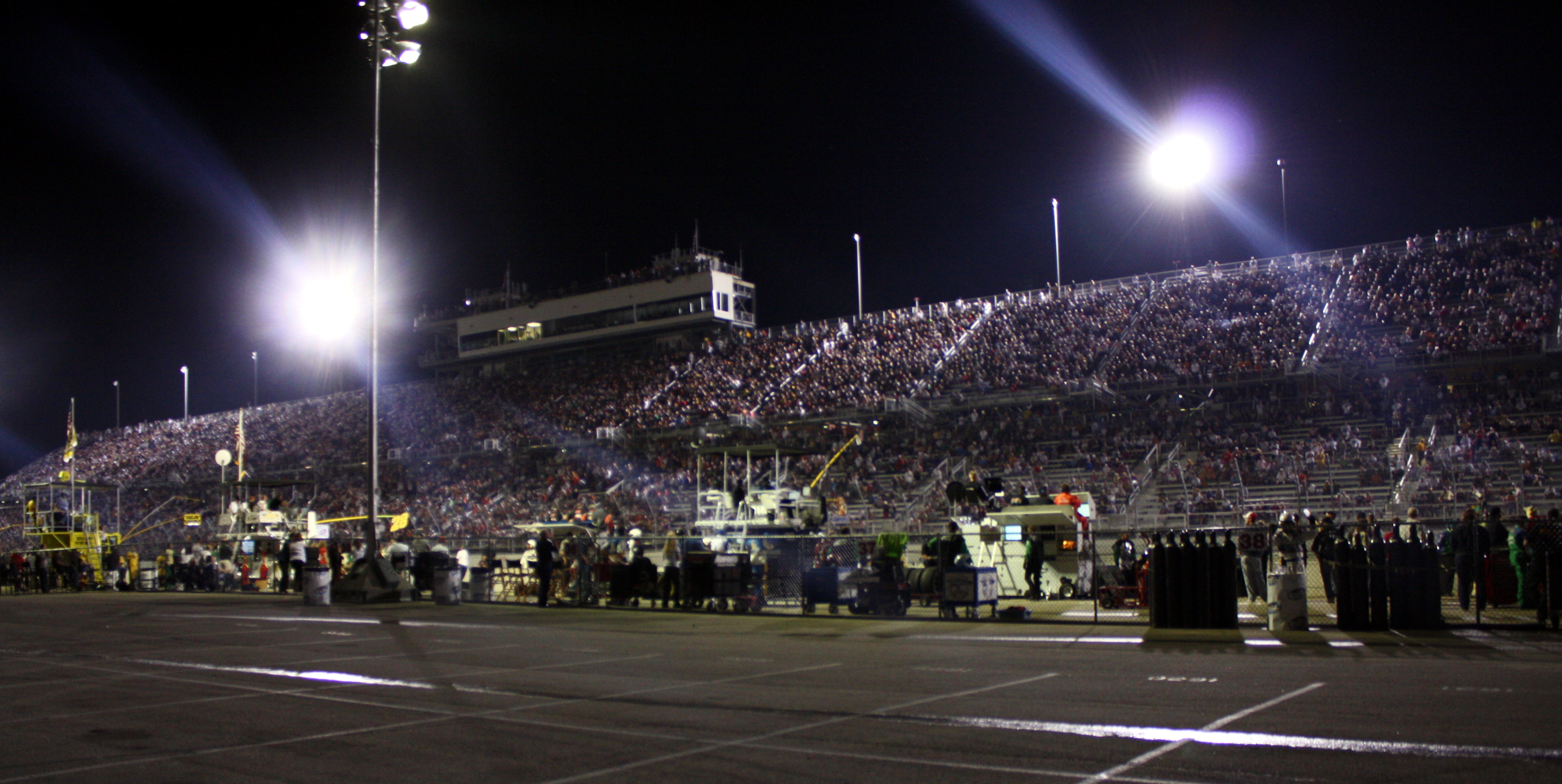
Crowd at the 2009 Nationwide race

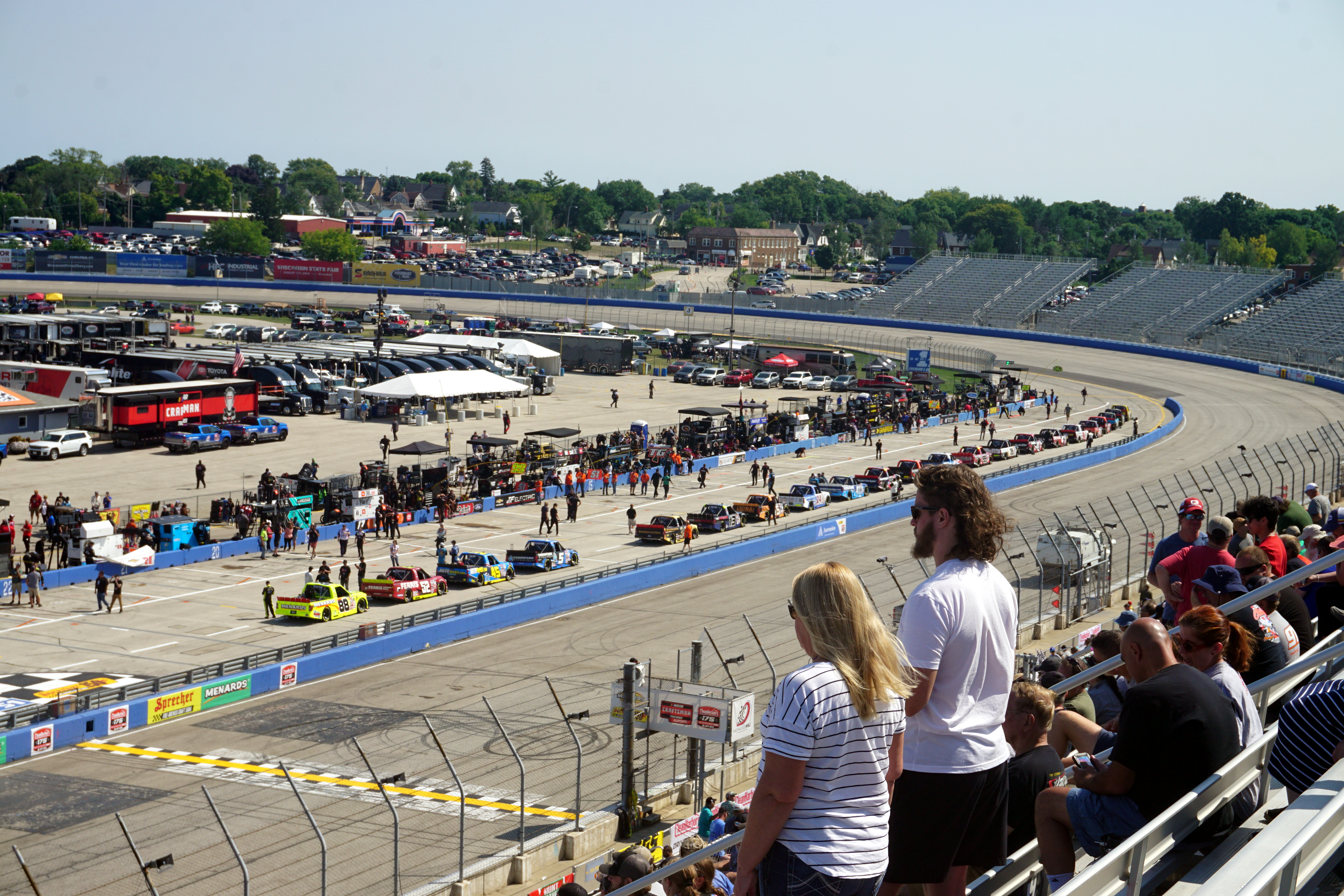
Track before the 2023 Clean Harbors 175

NASCAR held two NASCAR Busch Series stock car races at Milwaukee in 1984 and 1985. The 1984 field was full of NASCAR Winston Cup drivers: Alan Kulwicki (2nd), Dick Trickle (3rd), Bobby Allison (4th), Davey Allison (5th), Dale Jarrett (6th), and Darrell Waltrip (25th). The 1984 race was won by Sam Ard.

On July 3, 1993, the NASCAR Busch Series returned to Milwaukee. The event was won by Steve Grissom. In 1996 Wisconsin native Dick Trickle was passed with four laps to go by Buckshot Jones, who nosed out Mike McLaughlin and won the race from the furthest starting spot (32nd) and by the closest margin of victory in NASCAR Xfinity Series history (0.002 seconds). The Busch Series ran every year from 1993 to 2009. Five drivers who won the NASCAR Busch race at Milwaukee went on to win the Busch Series championship in the same year (Steve Grissom in 1993, Randy LaJoie in 1997, Dale Earnhardt Jr. in 1998, Jeff Green in 2000, and Greg Biffle in 2002). Biffle became the first repeat winner when he scored back-to-back victories in 2001 and 2002. Despite Trickle having come the closest previously, two NASCAR Busch Series races have been won by Wisconsin natives (Johnny Sauter/Necedah in 2005 and Paul Menard/Eau Claire in 2006). Menard also became the third driver to make the race at Milwaukee his first career series win, joining Jones in 1996 and Casey Atwood in 1999.

The NASCAR Craftsman Truck Series (CTS) began racing at Milwaukee in its inaugural season in 1995. Mike Skinner won the event. The 1996 event featured 17 lead changes. The CTS has returned every season since 1995. Ted Musgrave became the only repeat winner when he followed up victory in 2001 with a second triumph in 2004, both behind the wheel of the No. 1 Mopar Performance Parts Dodge for Jim Smith and Ultra Motorsports. Musgrave is also the only Wisconsin native to have won the race. Two drivers have the distinction of having won both a NASCAR Craftsman Truck Series race and a NASCAR Xfinity Series race at Milwaukee. Ron Hornaday won in the truck race in 1996 and the Busch race in 2004, while Greg Biffle won the truck race in 1999 and the Busch race in 2001 and 2002.

The track was resurfaced after the 1995 season. In 2003, temporary Musco lights were brought in for the Champ Car World Series event. The temporary lights were also used for the CTS and Busch Series events in 2005 and 2006.

== Records ==
=== Lap records ===
As of August 2024, the fastest official race lap records of the Milwaukee Mile are listed as:

| Category | Time | Driver | Vehicle | Event |
Paved Oval (1954–present): 1.015 mi (1.633 km)
| CART | 0:21.519 | (United States) Scott Pruett | Reynard 97I | 1998 Miller 200 |
| Champ Car | 0:21.765 | (United States) Ryan Hunter-Reay | Lola B02/00 | 2004 Time Warner Cable Road Runner 250 |
| IndyCar | 0:22.1211 | (Brazil) Helio Castroneves | Dallara DW12 | 2015 ABC Supply Wisconsin 250 |
| Indy Lights | 0:24.340 | (United States) Greg Ray | Lola T93/20 | 1996 Milwaukee Mile Indy Lights round |
| Formula Atlantic | 0:24.645 | (United States) Kyle Krisiloff | Swift 014.a | 2003 Milwaukee Mile Atlantic Championship round |
| Pro Mazda | 0:27.579 | (Australia) Matthew Brabham | Star Formula Mazda 'Pro' | 2013 Milwaukee Mile Pro Mazda round |
| Barber Pro | 0:29.303 | (Canada) Chris Green | Reynard 98E | 2003 Milwaukee Mile Barber Pro round |
| US F2000 | 0:29.418 | (Australia) Luke Ellery | Van Diemen DP08 | 2011 Milwaukee Mile US F2000 round |
| ARCA Menards | 0:29.887 | (United States) William Sawalich | Toyota Camry | 2024 Sprecher 150 |
| NASCAR Truck | 0:30.644 | (United States) Corey Heim | Toyota Tundra | 2023 Clean Harbors 175 |

=== Qualifying/race time records ===
CART/CCWS

| Type | Distance (miles / km) | Date | Driver | Time | Average speed (mph / km/h) |
|---|---|---|---|---|---|
| Qualifying (1 lap) | 1.032 / 1.66 | 1998 | (Canada) Patrick Carpentier | 0:00:20.028 | 185.500 / 298.888 |

IndyCar Series

| Type | Distance (miles / km) | Date | Driver | Time | Average speed (mph / km/h) |
|---|---|---|---|---|---|
| Qualifying (2 lap average) | 1.015 / 1.633 | 2011 | (United Kingdom) Dario Franchitti | 0:00:21.3826 | 170.841 / 274.499 |
| Race (225 laps) | 226.350 / 364.275 | 2000 | (Colombia) Juan Pablo Montoya | 1:37:38.526 | 142.684 / 229.628 |

Indy NXT

| Type | Distance (miles / km) | Date | Driver | Time | Average speed (mph / km/h) |
|---|---|---|---|---|---|
| Qualifying (1 lap) | 1.015 / 1.633 | 2025 | (Mexico) Salvador de Alba | 0:00:23.762 | 153.773 / 247.478 |
| Qualifying (2 lap average) | 1.015 / 1.633 | 2025 | (Norway) Dennis Hauger | 0:00:47.877 | 152.639 / 245.659 |

Formula Atlantic

| Type | Distance (miles / km) | Date | Driver | Time | Average speed (mph / km/h) |
|---|---|---|---|---|---|
| Qualifying (1 lap) | 1.015 / 1.633 | 2004 | (United States) Jon Fogarty | 0:00:24.676 | 148.079 / 238.310 |

Formula Super Vee

| Type | Distance (miles / km) | Date | Driver | Time | Average speed (mph / km/h) |
|---|---|---|---|---|---|
| Qualifying (1 lap) | 1.015 / 1.633 | June 2, 1989 | (United States) Mark Smith | 0:00:27.872 | 129.161 / 207.864 |
| Race (62 laps) | 201.200 / 323.800 | June 3, 1989 | (United States) Mark Smith | 0:29:24.520 | 126.490 / 203.565 |

NASCAR Nationwide Series

| Type | Distance (miles / km) | Date | Driver | Time | Average speed (mph / km/h) |
|---|---|---|---|---|---|
| Qualifying (1 lap) | 1.006 / 1.619 | June 25, 2005 | (United States) Johnny Sauter | 0:00:29.365 | 122.595 / 197.298 |
| Race (200 laps) | 201.200 / 323.800 | June 26, 2004 | (United States) Ron Hornaday | 2:26:59.??? | 105.052 / 169.065 |

NASCAR Craftsman Truck Series

| Type | Distance (miles / km) | Date | Driver | Time | Average speed (mph / km/h) |
|---|---|---|---|---|---|
| Qualifying (1 lap) | 1.006 / 1.619 | August 26, 2023 | (United States) Grant Enfinger | 0:00:29.744 | 122.848 / 197.705 |
| Race (125 laps) | 125 / 201.168 | July 1, 1995 | (United States) Mike Skinner | 1:25:48.??? | 87.413 / 140.677 |
| Race (175 laps) | 177.625 / 285.860 | August 25, 2024 | (United States) Layne Riggs | 1:49:16.??? | 97.537 / 156.971 |
| Race (200 laps) | 201.200 / 323.800 | June 24, 2005 | (United States) Dennis Setzer | 1:49:11.??? | 109.907 / 177.083 |

ARCA Menards Series

| Type | Distance (miles / km) | Date | Driver | Time | Average speed (mph / km/h) |
|---|---|---|---|---|---|
| Qualifying (1 lap) | 1.006 / 1.619 | 2024 | (United States) William Sawalich | 0:00:29.002 | 125.991 / 202.763 |

== Track length of paved oval ==
The track length is disputed by the three major series that run at the Milwaukee Mile. The NASCAR timing and scoring used a length of 1.000 mi (1.609 km). The IRL timing and scoring used a length of 1.015 mi (1.633 km). CART used a length of 1.032 mi (1.661 km) between 1997 and 2006. For the Truck race in 2023, NASCAR also used the 1.015 mi (1.633 km) length.

== NFL stadium in the middle of the quarter-mile oval ==
The infield of the quarter-mile dirt infield track at the Mile near the current media center was also the location of a football stadium, informally known as the Dairy Bowl. It hosted the NFL's Green Bay Packers from 1934 through 1951, including the NFL championship game in 1939, a 27–0 shutout of the New York Giants on December 10 to secure a fifth league title.

In 1940 and 1941, the Dairy Bowl also served as the home of the Milwaukee Chiefs of the third American Football League. The 50-yard line sat where the start-finish line is currently located. The city's own entry in the NFL, the Milwaukee Badgers, lasted just five seasons, from 1922 to 1926, and played at Athletic Park, renamed Borchert Field in 1928.

== Images ==
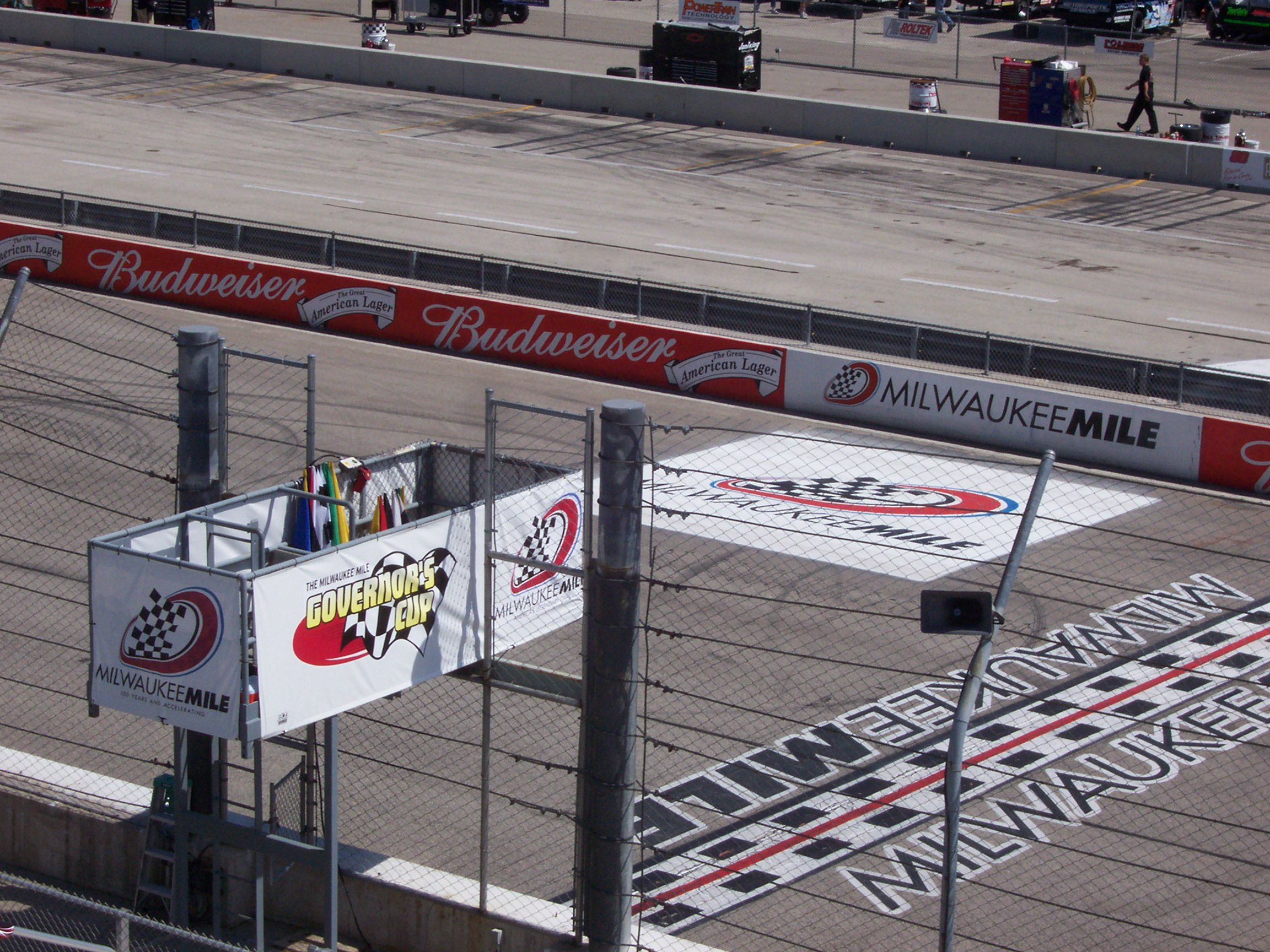
Start/finish line in 2008

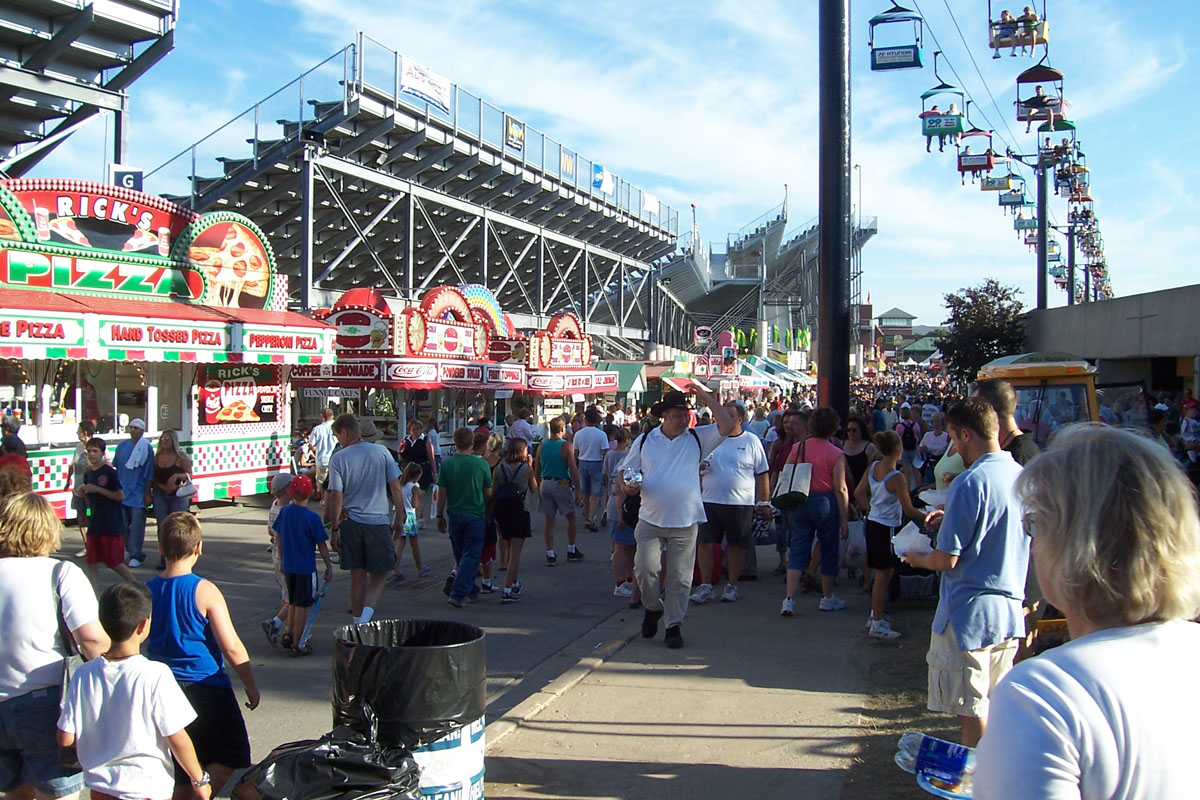
View of grandstands during the Wisconsin State Fair

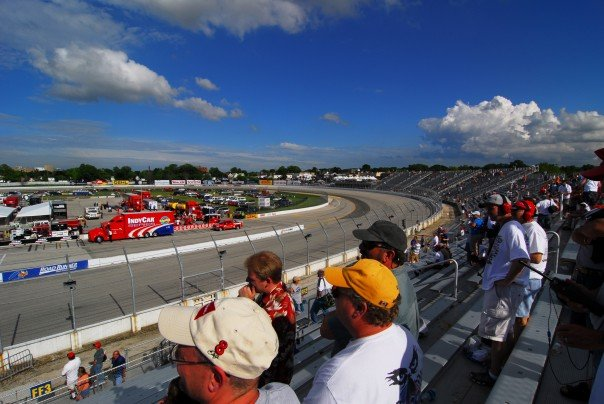
View of grandstands during the 2007 A.J. Foyt 225 IRL race

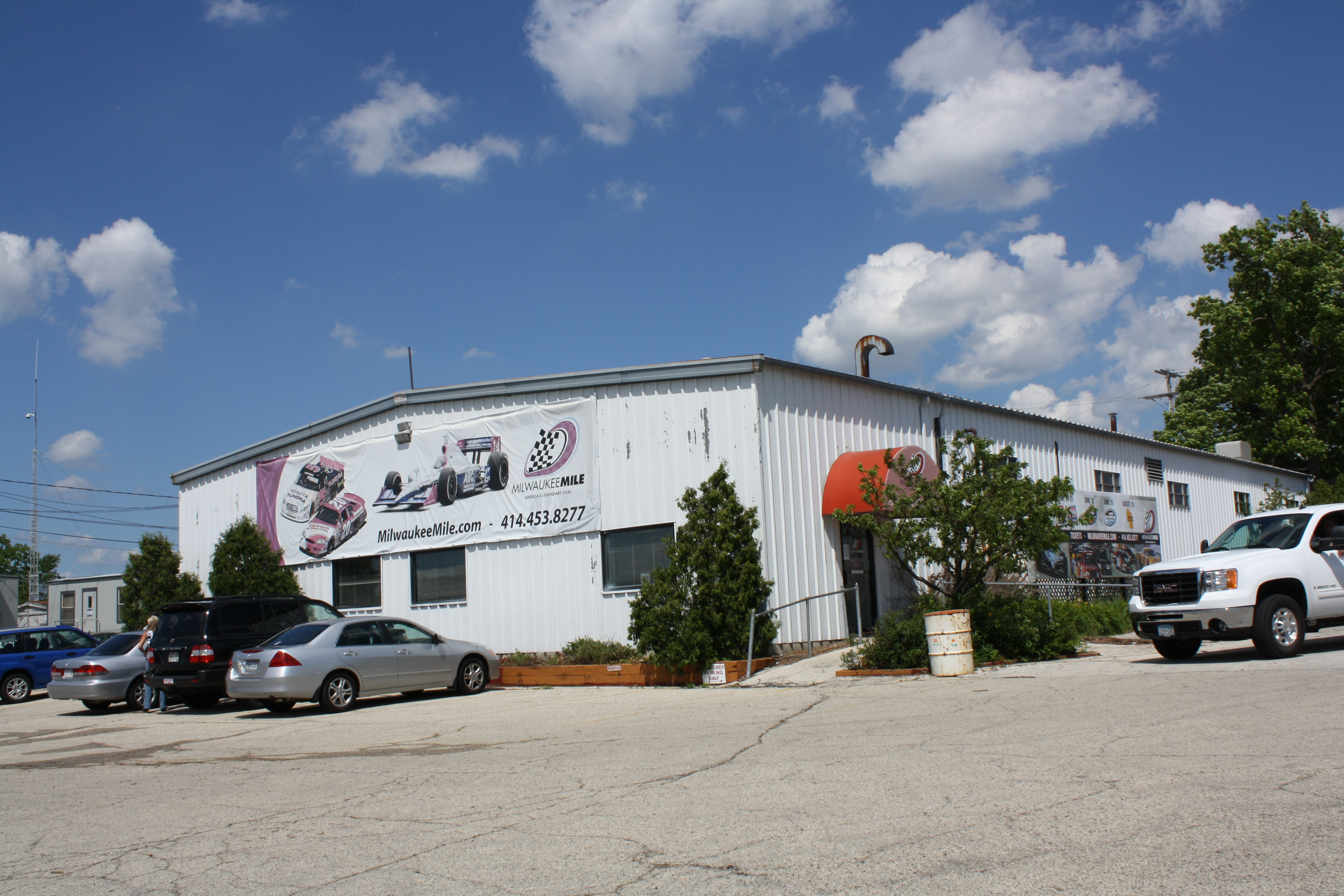
Old Offices (Now Wisconsin State Fair Park Box Office and Administration Building)

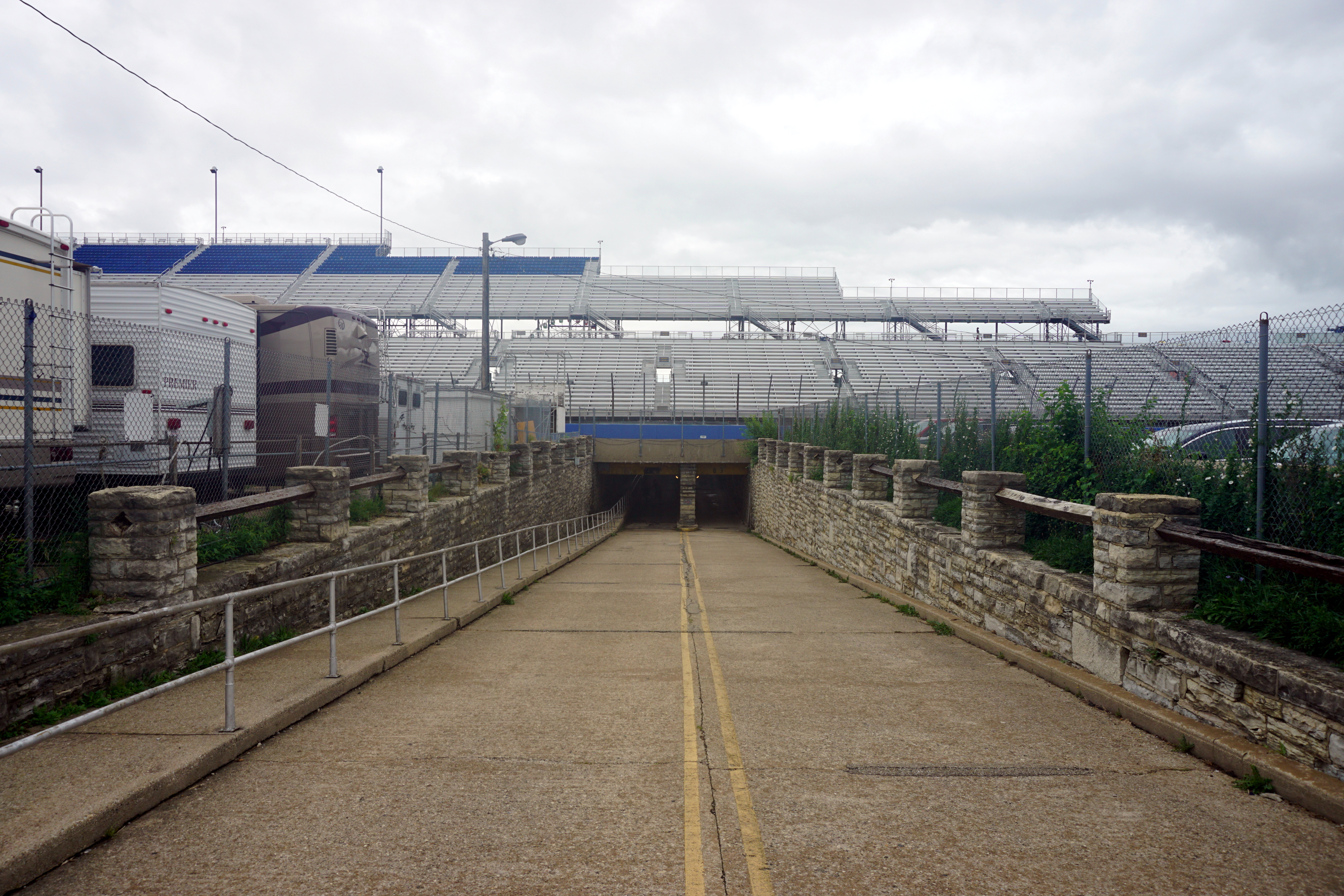
Infield tunnel in 2022

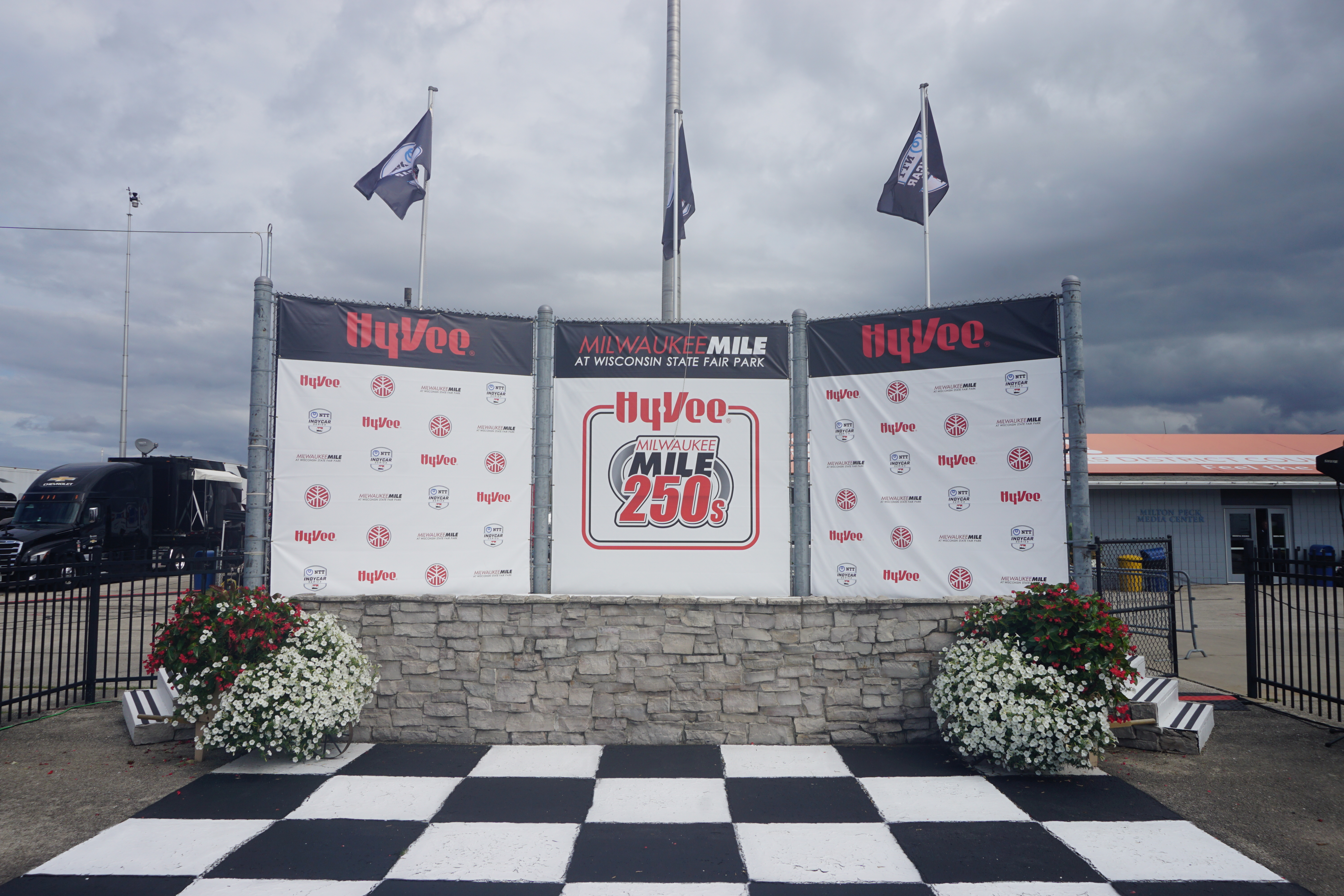
Victory lane in 2024

| Preceded by Borchert Field | Milwaukee Home of the Green Bay Packers; 1934 – 1951 | Succeeded by Marquette Stadium |
