= Offenhauser Sales Corporation =

Speed parts company

Offenhauser Sales Corp
- Formerly: Offenhauser
- Company type: Private
- Industry: Automotive
- Founded: c. 1946
- Founder: Fred C. Offenhauser Sr.
- Headquarters: Los Angeles, US
- Key people: Jason Curtis, President and CEO
- Products: Automotive parts
- Operating income: US$ 4,295,000
- Number of employees: 12
- Website: www.offenhauser.co

Offenhauser Sales Corporation is an American manufacturer of racing, custom car and performance automotive parts founded around 1946 by Fred C. Offenhauser Sr., nephew of Fred H. Offenhauser, co-designer of the Offy racing engine. From 1983 until 2020, the second generation President of the company was Fred C. "Tay" Offenhauser Jr., son of founder Fred C. Offenhauser. After working with his uncle Fred H. Offenhauser in the 1930s and 1940s, Fred C. served in the US Navy during World War II, and returned home to found his speed parts business. The company is unrelated to the Offy or Offenhauser racing engine, and after a suit over the use of the name, Offenhauser Sales Corporation was allowed to use the family name, but not the racing engine nickname "Offy". In 2016 Jason Curtis joined the company and in 2020 became acting President and CEO.
