= Brunots Island Race Track =

Race track in Pittsburgh, Pennsylvania, USA

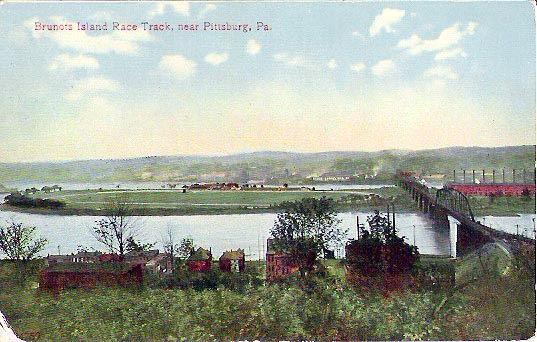
- Location: (United States) Pittsburgh, Pennsylvania
- Coordinates: 40°27′47.02″N 80°2′35.99″W
- Opened: 1903
- Closed: 1914

Oval
- Surface: Dirt
- Length: 1.6 km (0.99 mi)
- Turns: 4
- Banking: 0°

Brunots Island Race Track was a one-mile (1.6 km) dirt oval on Brunot Island in Pittsburgh, Pennsylvania. It hosted races from 1903 to 1914, including a race in 1905 AAA Championship Car season won by Louis Chevrolet. It is now the site of a fossil-fuel power plant.
