= Guy Vaughan =

American racing driver (1884–1966)

- Born: Guy Warner Vaughan; August 15, 1884 Bayshore, New York, U.S.
- Died: November 21, 1966 (aged 82) New Rochelle, New York, U.S.

Champ Car career
- 1 race run over 1 year
- Best finish: 5th (1905)
- First race: 1905 Morris Park Race #1 (Morris Park)
Wins	Podiums	Poles
0	1	0

Guy Warner Vaughan (often seen as Vaughn; August 15, 1884 – November 21, 1966) was an American racing driver and industrialist who served as the president of Curtiss-Wright from 1935 to 1949.

== Biography ==
Born in Bayshore, New York, Vaughan completed his education at New Rochelle High School in 1898. Vaughan's career began with the automobile manufacturer Desberon, complemented by continued education through mail-order courses. He later transitioned to the Standard Automobile Company. Vaughan participated in the inaugural AAA Championship car season in 1905, competing in the first-ever Championship event at Morris Park Racecourse in the Bronx. He was notable for his successes in long-distance races. In 1908, he finished third in the First American International Road Race, held in Briarcliff Manor, New York.

After the First World War, Vaughan joined Curtiss, initially as an aviation quality manager. The company was later renamed Curtiss-Wright. Vaughan ascended to vice president by 1925, and was appointed president and chairman in 1935. His tenure saw the development of the Wright Whirlwind J-6 engine, utilized by Charles Lindbergh, and the Wright Cyclone engine series, which powered DC-1 aircraft.

During the Second World War, Vaughan dramatically increased production capabilities, expanding from four to seventeen plants. During the war, Curtiss-Wright manufactured nearly 150,000 engines and propellers, alongside more than 25,000 aircraft. Under Vaughan's leadership, company sales surged from $11 million in 1933 to $128 million by 1949, the year of his retirement.
