= Brunot Island =

Island of the Ohio River in Pennsylvania, United States

Coordinates: 40°27′47″N 80°2′36″W

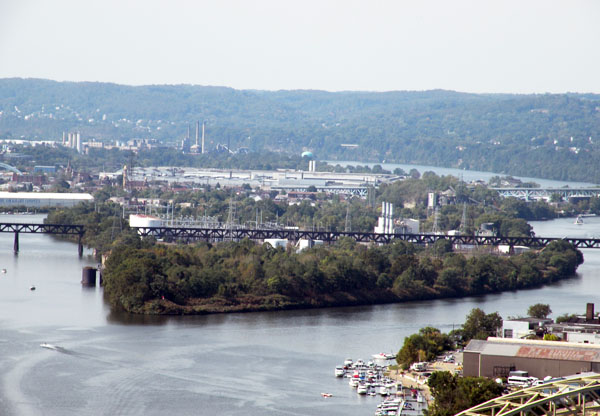
A view of Brunot Island from Mount Washington

Brunot Island (also spelled Brunot's Island) is a 129-acre (52 ha) island in the Ohio River. It is officially part of the Marshall-Shadeland neighborhood of Pittsburgh, Pennsylvania, United States. It was named for Dr. Felix Brunot who settled the island with his extended family in the late 1700s. The family entertained the Lewis and Clark Expedition on the island in August 1803. The island is home to the Brunot Island Generating Station, a 315 MW fossil fuel power plant.

The Ohio Connecting Railroad Bridge crosses the Ohio River at the island. The island does not otherwise connect to the land, and all vehicular traffic must use a ferry to access the island. The employees of the power plant use a pedestrian walkway on the railroad bridge to go to work. The walkway is not accessible to the public.

From 1903 to 1914, the island was the home of Brunots Island Race Track.

== Brunot Island Generating Station ==
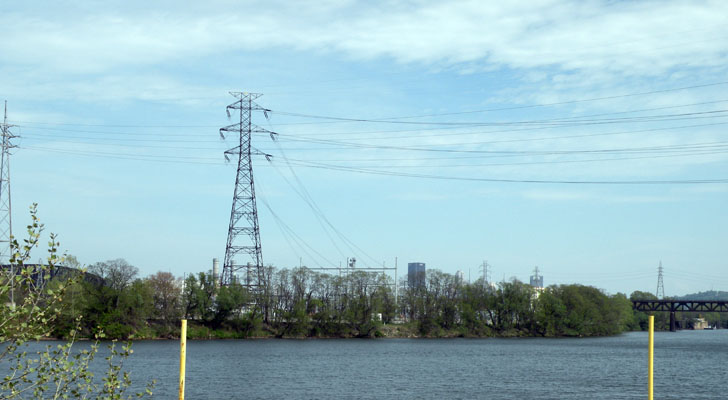
A view of Brunot Island as seen from River Avenue in McKees Rocks

- Type: Fossil fuel; oil and natural gas
- Net capacity: 315 MW (megawatts)
- Began operation: 1972; 54 years ago
- Current owner: NRG Energy

=== Plants ===
- Three oil-fired simple cycle peaking power plants
  - Total generating capacity: 53 MW
- One natural-gas-fired combined cycle power plant
  - Total generating capacity: 262 MW
