= Golden Submarine =

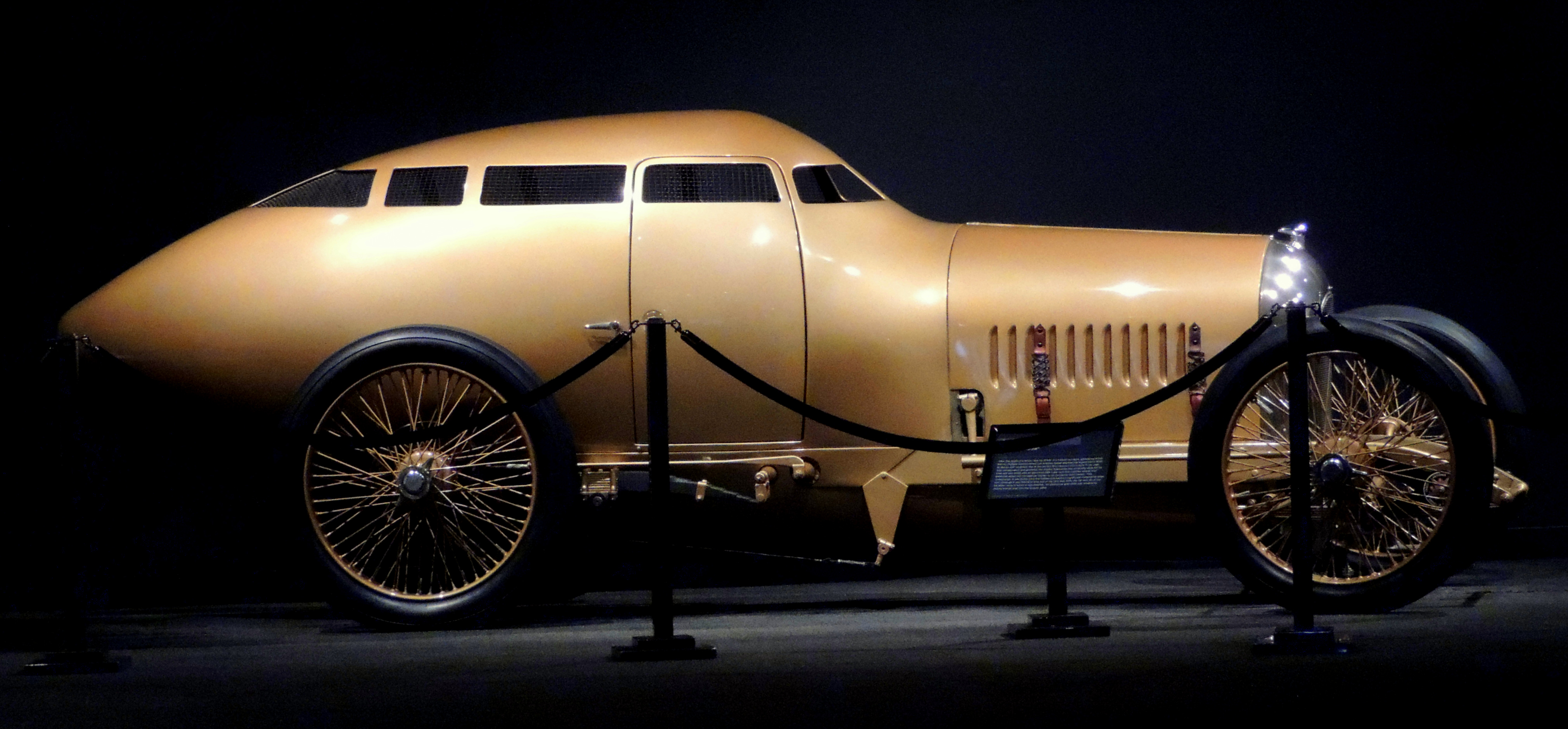
- Constructor: (United States) Harry A. Miller

Technical specifications
- Engine: 289 cu in (4,740 cc)
- Weight: 1,600 lb (730 kg)

Competition history
- Notable drivers: (United States) Barney Oldfield
- Debut: 16 June 1917
Races	Wins
54	20

The Golden Submarine was an early twentieth century streamlined race car designed and built in 1917 by Fred Offenhauser and Harry A. Miller for Barney Oldfield. AutoWeek said that the vehicle brought Miller "nationwide prominence as a race-car builder".

== Background ==
Golden Submarine replica

Oldfield worked with Miller, who developed and built carburetors in Los Angeles, to create a racing machine that would not only be fast and durable, but that would also protect the driver in the event of an accident. Bob Burman, one of Oldfield's top rivals and closest friends, was killed along with his riding mechanic Erick Schrader in a wreck during a race in Corona, California. They died from severe injuries suffered while rolling over in Burman's open-cockpit Peugeot. A track official and three spectators were also killed in the crash. Oldfield and Miller joined forces to build a race car that incorporated an enclosed roll cage inside a streamlined driver's compartment to completely enclose the driver.

== Construction ==
The Golden Submarine was built from aluminum with holes for the driver to look out. The gold color was achieved with a combination of bronze dust and lacquer. The car cost $US 15,000 to build ($377,000 in 2025).

=== Specifications ===
The car featured a four-cylinder aluminum alloy engine with 289 cubic inches (4.74 L), 3-5/8" (92.075mm) bore × 7" (177.800mm) stroke, 136 hp (101 kW) @ 2950 revolutions per minute (RPM), a single overhead cam, desmodromic valves, dual intake ports for each cylinder, dual spark plugs and magnetos. Its body and chassis were wind tunnel-tested aluminum body with rollover protection. It had a 104-inch (260 cm) wheelbase and it weighed 1,600 pounds (730 kg).

== Race history ==
The car made its first outing on 16 June 1917 at the Chicago Board Speedway in Maywood, Illinois. The engine failed after 10 miles (16 km), but it averaged 104 mph (167 km/h) up to that point. The engine problems were ironed out the following week and on 25 June he defeated arch-rival Ralph DePalma three times on the Milwaukee dirt track. The car competed in 54 races with 20 wins, 2 seconds, and 2 thirds. The car qualified for the 1919 Indianapolis 500 but it dropped out after its engine failed.
