= 1905 AAA Championship Car season =

American open-wheel racing championship season

- AAA National Circuit Championship

Season
- Races: 11
- Start date: June 10
- End date: September 29

Awards
- National champion: (United States) Barney Oldfield

The 1905 AAA National Motor Car Championship consisted of 11 points-paying races, beginning in The Bronx, New York on June 10 and concluding in Poughkeepsie, New York on September 29. There were also at least two non-championship events held during the year. This was the first year that the AAA Contest Board (then known as the Racing Board) officially recognized a National Champion in American Championship Car competition.

The 1905 AAA National Champion was Barney Oldfield. For reasons unclear, but likely due to a change in attitudes and opinions by AAA officials about the dangers of racing following several serious accidents, no national championship was officially recognized again until 1916.

== Schedule and results ==
All races running on Dirt Oval.

Rnd	Date	Race Name	Track	Location	Winning driver
1	June 10	Morris Park 5	Morris Park	The Bronx, New York	(United States) Louis Chevrolet
2	June 17	Hartford 5	Charter Oak Park	West Hartford, Connecticut	(United States) Barney Oldfield
3	June 26	Empire City 10	Empire City Speedway	Yonkers, New York	(United States) Louis Chevrolet
4	June 28	Brunots Island	Brunots Island Driving Track	Pittsburgh, Pennsylvania	(United States) Barney Oldfield
5	June 29	Brunots Island 10	Brunots Island Driving Track	Pittsburgh, Pennsylvania	(United States) Louis Chevrolet
6	July 4	Morris Park 1	Morris Park	The Bronx, New York	(United States) Webb Jay
NC	August 8	Grosse Pointe 5	Grosse Pointe Track	Detroit, Michigan	(United States) Webb Jay
7	August 14	Glenville 5	Glenville Race Track	Cleveland, Ohio	(United States) Charles Burman
8	August 19	Buffalo 5	Kenilworth Park	Buffalo, New York	(United States) Barney Oldfield
9	September 9	Readville 5	Readville Trotting Park	Readville, Massachusetts	(United States) Barney Oldfield
NC	September 18	Syracuse 5 (Note: "Considerable and reasonable doubt is raised" (based on coverage in The Motor World) about the Syracuse event being a points-paying race in the 1905 national championship; per research by Don Capps (February 14, 2015).)	New York State Fairgrounds	Syracuse, New York	(United States) Guy Vaughan
10	September 23	Providence 5	Narragansett Park Speedway	Cranston, Rhode Island	(United States) Barney Oldfield
11	September 29	Poughkeepsie 5	Hudson River Driving Park	Poughkeepsie, New York	(United States) Barney Oldfield

Non-championship race

== Leading National Championship standings ==
#	Driver	Car	Points
1	(United States) Barney Oldfield	Peerless "Green Dragon"	26
2	(United States) Louis Chevrolet	Fiat 90	12
3	(United States) Webb Jay	White Steamer	4
4	(United States) Charles Burman	Peerless	4
5	(Italy) Emanuel Cedrino	Fiat	4
6	(United States) Dan Wurgis	Reo Bird 32	4
7	(United States) Herbert Lytle	Pope-Toledo	2
8	(United States) Montague Roberts	Thomas	2
9	(United States) Frank Wridgeway	Peerless	1
	(United States) Guy Vaughan	Decauville	
	(France) Maurice Bernin	Renault	
	(United States) Frank Durbin	Stanley	

In 1951, Victor Hémery, winner of the 1905 Vanderbilt Cup, was retroactively awarded a national championship. At a later point, it was recognized by historians that these championship results were revisionist, after discovering published sources naming Oldfield as the National Champion.
