= Fred Offenhauser =

American automotive engineer (1888–1973)

Fred H. Offenhauser, Jr.
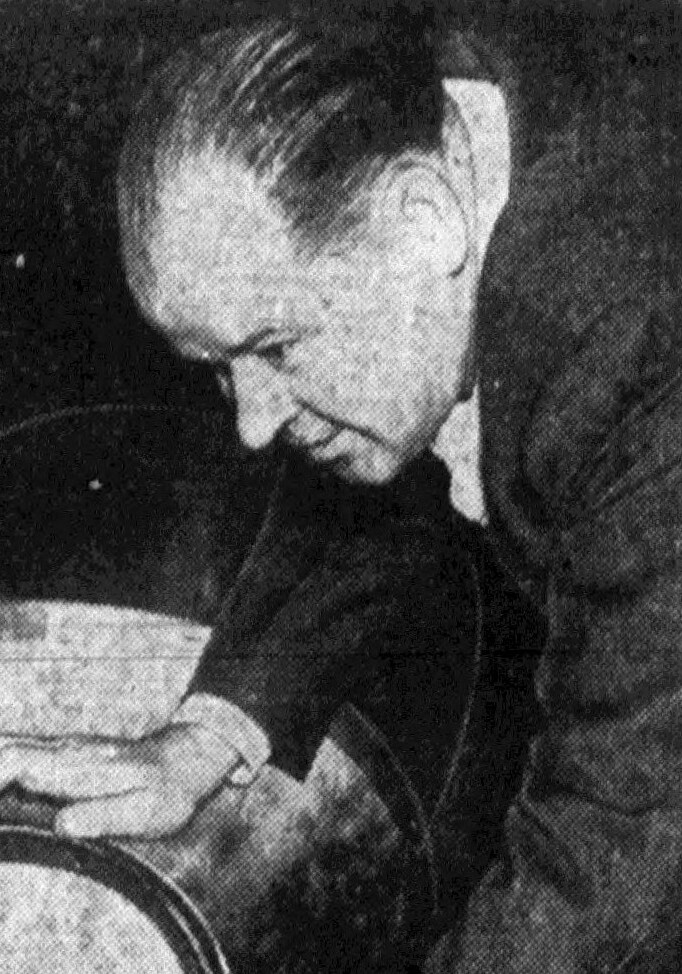
- Offenhauser, circa 1941
- Born: October 20, 1888; Los Angeles, California
- Died: August 17, 1973 (aged 84); Los Angeles, California
- Spouse: Ethel C. Lowery
- Parent(s): Martha and Frederick Offenhauser

Fred H. Offenhauser, Jr. (November 11, 1888 – August 17, 1973), was an American machinist and self taught automotive engineer who developed the Offenhauser racing engine, nicknamed the "Offy", which dominated competition in the Indianapolis 500 race for decades. He also built the Novi engine, which was designed by Bud Winfield and Leo Goossen.

== Biography ==
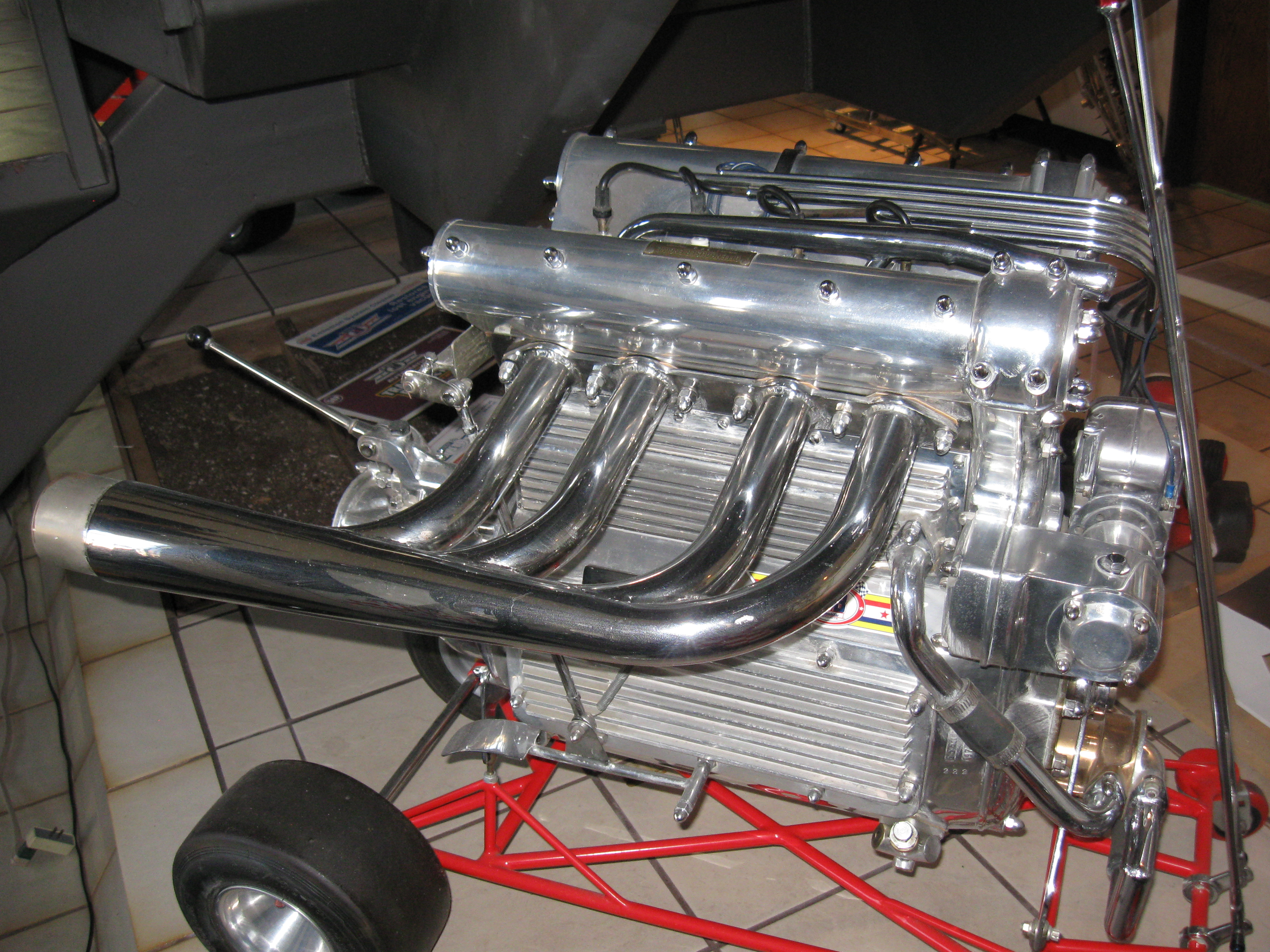
An Offenhauser midget engine, polished for display

Frederick Offenhauser, Jr., was born November 11, 1888, in Los Angeles, California, the oldest child of Martha and Frederick Offenhauser. Both his parents were natives of Germany who had emigrated as young adults. His father worked as a barber. Offenhauser, Jr. married Ethel C. Lowery.

In 1913, when he was 25, Offenhauser began working in the shop of Harry Arminius Miller, having learned his trade as a machinist working for a railroad. That year a Peugeot Grand Prix car won the Indianapolis 500. It was equipped with a state-of-the-art double overhead cam, four valve per cylinder engine. Miller named Offenhauser as the head of his engine department in 1914.

Bob Burman was campaigning the Peugeot engine that year, but when World War I made it impossible to get parts, Miller's shop got the job of maintaining it. The design so impressed Miller and Offenhauser that they designed an engine on largely similar principles.

In 1917, Offenhauser designed and built Barney Oldfield's famous "Golden Submarine". In 1919, Leo Goossen joined Miller's shop, and Offenhauser became plant manager. Miller's company went bankrupt in 1933 during the Great Depression.

Offenhauser bought the patterns and equipment from Miller, and began developing a new engine with Goossen. What became known as the Offenhauser engine was driven to great success in roadsters at the Indianapolis 500, with 24 victories in 27 years. Offenhauser did not frequently attend the races at Indianapolis.

In 1934, Offenhauser built his first 97-cubic inch-engine for midget car racing. Curly Mills was the first to win with this engine in his car.

By 1941, Offenhauser's shop had developed the Novi engine, designed by Goossen and Bud Winfield. It was first promoted under the Winfield name. With additional development, it was used on racing cars in the Indianapolis 500 from 1941 to 1966.

In 1946, Offenhauser sold his business to Louis Meyer and Dale Drake. Meyer and Drake continued producing the motor using the Offenhauser name.

Offenhauser died August 17, 1973, in Los Angeles, California. He was buried at Inglewood Park Cemetery in Inglewood, California.

== Legacy and posthumous awards ==
- In 1982, Offenhauser was inducted into the Indianapolis Motor Speedway Hall of Fame.
- In 1994. he was inducted into the National Sprint Car Hall of Fame.
- In 1999, he was inducted into the National Midget Auto Racing Hall of Fame.
- In 2001, he inducted into the International Motorsports Hall of Fame.
- In 2002, he was inducted into the Motorsports Hall of Fame of America.
