= Desberon =

Defunct American motor vehicle manufacturer

- Industry: Automobile
- Founded: 1901; 125 years ago
- Defunct: 1904; 122 years ago
- Fate: Dissolved
- Headquarters: New Rochelle, New York
- Products: Automobiles, Radiators, Engines

The Desberon was an American automobile manufactured from 1901 until 1904. The company initially built steam trucks, and later branched out into making 4 hp gas-driven "pleasure carriages" built along "French lines". Later still, 6·2 liter 12 hp models were produced.

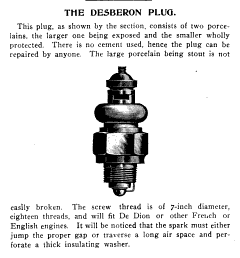
Patented Desberon Spark Plug

== History ==
Desberon would be formed in late 1900. The purpose of the company would be to repair vehicles of all makes, sell accessories, and to manufacture their own branded cars. An office and factory would be opened at 12 Rose Street in New Rochelle, New York. At the time of the company forming a four-ton steam truck and a three-horsepower voiturette were planned.

In 1903 multiple automobiles would be listed, it is unsure how many were made, but along with automobiles the company would be advertising various engines and transmissions and mufflers made by the company.

=== Desberon Cellular Cooler ===
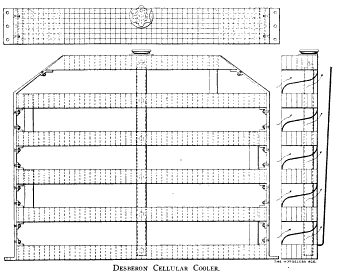
Desberon Radiator showing top side and front view

An unusual radiator would be advertised by the company in 1903 known as the "Desberon Cellular Cooler", which was a very different way of cooling a car as opposed to the honeycomb radiator at the time. Unlike a more standard radiator which had a mesh like appearance, the Desberon would employ six horizontal tubes welded onto a frame. The design of the radiator created a natural draft during driving which made using a fan unnecessary. The primary advantage was that the Desberon was far easier to repair than the honeycomb radiators. The company had hoped for other manufactures to use the radiator, but it does not seem like any ever did. A possible reason for the failure of the cooling system was that it created a very unusual appearance for the cars that were equipped with it.

== Models ==
=== Steam Truck ===
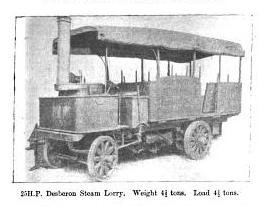
Desberon Steam Truck

The steam wagon was a coal fired steam truck announced in 1901. The boiler was in the front of the truck, and storage for extra coal was also in the front of the vehicle. The water capacity was planned to be anywhere form 600 to 700 pounds. There were two water tanks, one in the front in the cab and another behind the rear axle. Total weight was around 3 and a half tons. The truck ran on steel rims, the front wheel was 34 inches and the rear was 40 inches. The designer was E.T. Birdsall.

=== Unnamed Model ===
During the May 30th A.C.A 100-mile endurance run a 8 horsepower gasoline model made by Desberon and driven by David S. Brown Jr. would enter the race. It would not finish.

=== Model C and D ===
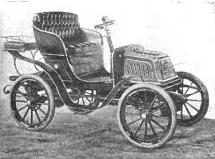
Desberon Model C

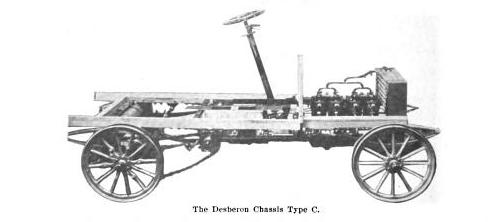
Desberon Model C Chassis

A one-seat car known and as the Model C would be available for 1903. It would weigh 1100 pounds and would cost $1400. Power was by a two-cylinder gasoline engine making 7 horsepower. The car could go at least 25 miles and hour. A tonneau for extra passengers could be attached, when attached the weight would increase to 133 pounds and the cost would rise to $1,750.

The Model D would be a larger more powerful model weighing 1700 pounds and costing $3000. Horsepower would be 15 from a four-cylinder engine and speeds of 40 miles per hour were possible.

=== 30 Horsepower Model ===
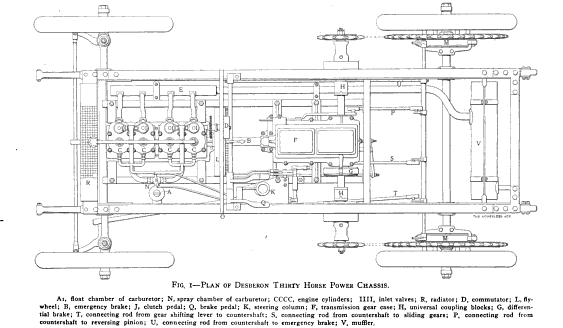
Desberon Model 30 Chassis

In late 1903 a new 30 horsepower car would be introduced to the public as a 1904 model year. The car would have four cylinders. the car had a 12-gallon gasoline tank under the seat. Final drive was by chains. Wheelbase was 78 inches. The body type was "King of the Belgians"
