= Webb Jay =

American racing driver (1870–1952)

- Born: Webb Jay; June 22, 1870 Dexter, Iowa, U.S.
- Died: June 4, 1952 (aged 81) Miami, Florida, U.S.

Champ Car career
- 3 races run over 1 year
- Best finish: 4th (1905)
- First race: 1905 Empire City Race (Empire City)
- Last race: 1905 Glenville Race (Cleveland)
- First win: 1905 Morris Park Race #2 (Morris Park)
Wins	Podiums	Poles
1	2	0

Webb Jay (June 22, 1870 – June 4, 1952) was an American racing driver. Jay participated in the inaugural AAA Championship car season in 1905. Competing for the White Motor Company in a steam-powered vehicle known as "Whistling Billy," Jay performed strongly, setting the world record time for one mile at Morris Park Racecourse, on July 4, 1905. Later that season, he suffered a career ending injury, after initially being reported dead.
