= Louis Chevrolet =

American racing driver (1878–1941)

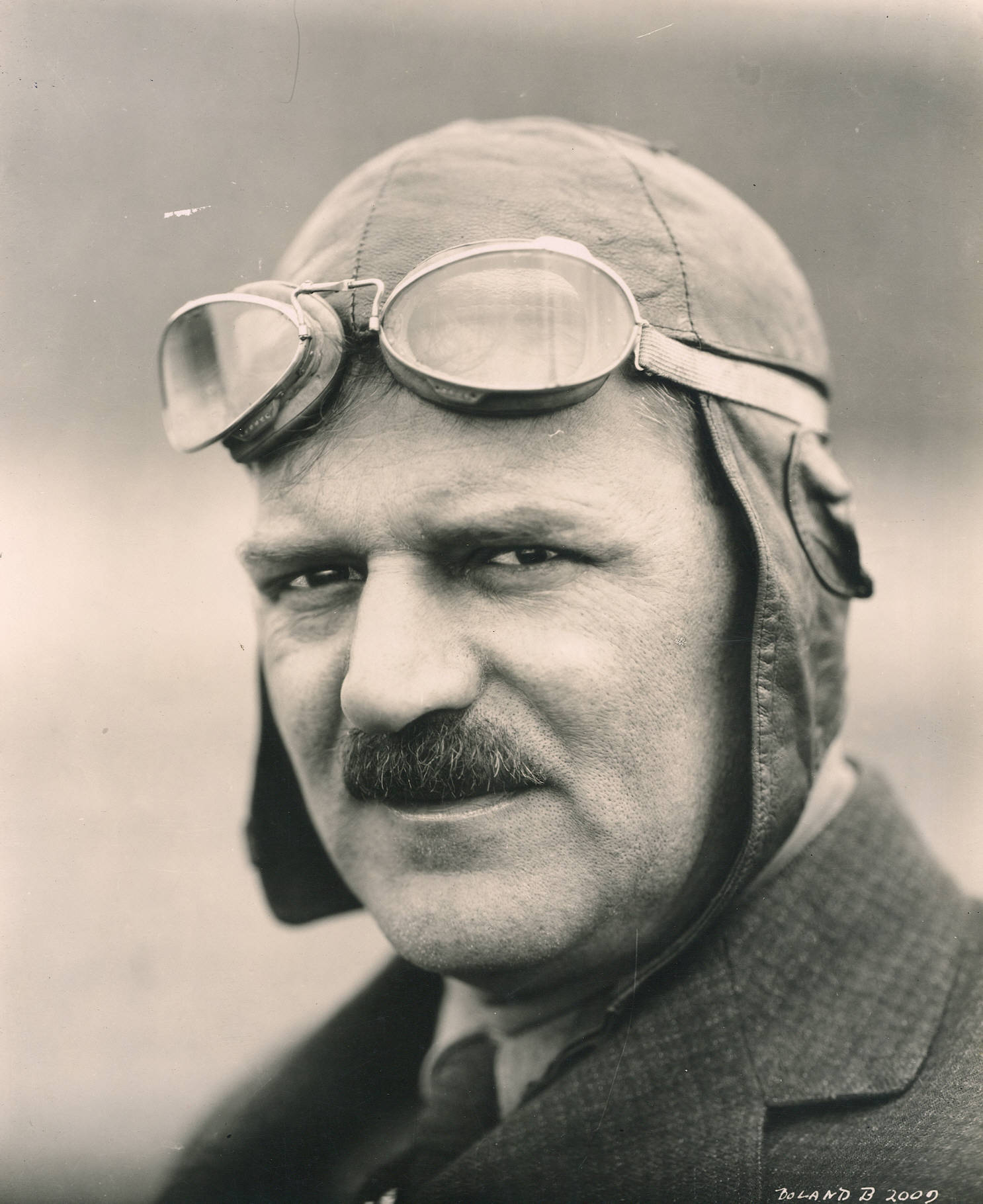
- Chevrolet at Tacoma, June 1919
- Born: Louis-Joseph Chevrolet; December 25, 1878 La Chaux-de-Fonds, Neuchâtel, Switzerland
- Died: June 6, 1941 (aged 62) Detroit, Michigan, U.S.

Champ Car career
- 54 races run over 9 years
- Best finish: 2nd (1905)
- First race: 1905 Morris Park Race #1 (Morris Park)
- Last race: 1920 Indianapolis 500 (Indianapolis)
- First win: 1905 Morris Park Race #1 (Morris Park)
- Last win: 1919 80-mile Race (Tacoma)
Wins	Podiums	Poles
14	23	3

Louis-Joseph Chevrolet (December 25, 1878 – June 6, 1941) was a Swiss-born American racing driver, mechanic, and entrepreneur who co-founded the Chevrolet Motor Car Company in 1911.

== Early life ==
Louis-Joseph Chevrolet was born on December 25, 1878, in La Chaux-de-Fonds, a center of watchmaking in the French speaking northwestern Switzerland. He was the second child of Joseph-Félicien Chevrolet, a watchmaker, and Marie-Anne Angéline Mahon. His family was originally from Bonfol, now in the canton of Jura.

In 1887, Chevrolet left Switzerland along with his father to settle in Beaune, France. There, as a young man, he developed his mechanical skills and interest in bicycle racing. During this period, Chevrolet invented a wine pump, which he built from a defective one-cylinder motor mounted on a tricycle.

== Career ==
=== Early career ===
Chevrolet worked at the Roblin mechanics shop in Beaune from around 1889 to 1899. He then moved to Paris, where he worked at various mechanics shops, between 1899 and 1900, before emigrating to Montreal, Quebec, Canada, in 1900 to work as a mechanic. The following year, he moved to New York City, where he worked briefly for a fellow Swiss immigrant's engineering company, then moved to the Brooklyn operations of the French car manufacturer de Dion-Bouton.

In 1905, Chevrolet won his first race, racing a Fiat at Morris Park, the first-ever national championship race sanctioned by the American Automobile Association (AAA) Contest Board, then known as the Racing Board. In 1907, he was hired by the Autocar Company in Philadelphia, probably for a secret project to develop a revolutionary front-wheel-drive racing car.

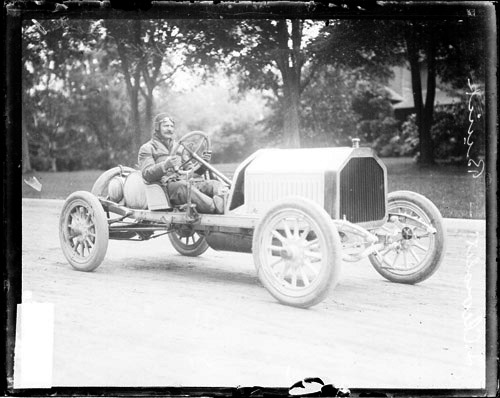
Chevrolet, racing a Buick, won the 1909 Cobe Trophy Race, held in Crown Point, Indiana

Chevrolet's racing career continued as he drove for Buick, becoming a friend and associate of Buick owner William C. Durant, founder of General Motors. He raced at the Giants Despair Hillclimb in 1909. With little in the way of formal education, Chevrolet learned car design while working for Buick, and started designing his own engine for a new car in 1909. He built an overhead valve six-cylinder engine in his own machine shop on Grand River Boulevard in Detroit. He is credited as one of three co-designers of the 1910 Buick 60 Special, also known as the "Buick Bug".

=== Chevrolet car company ===
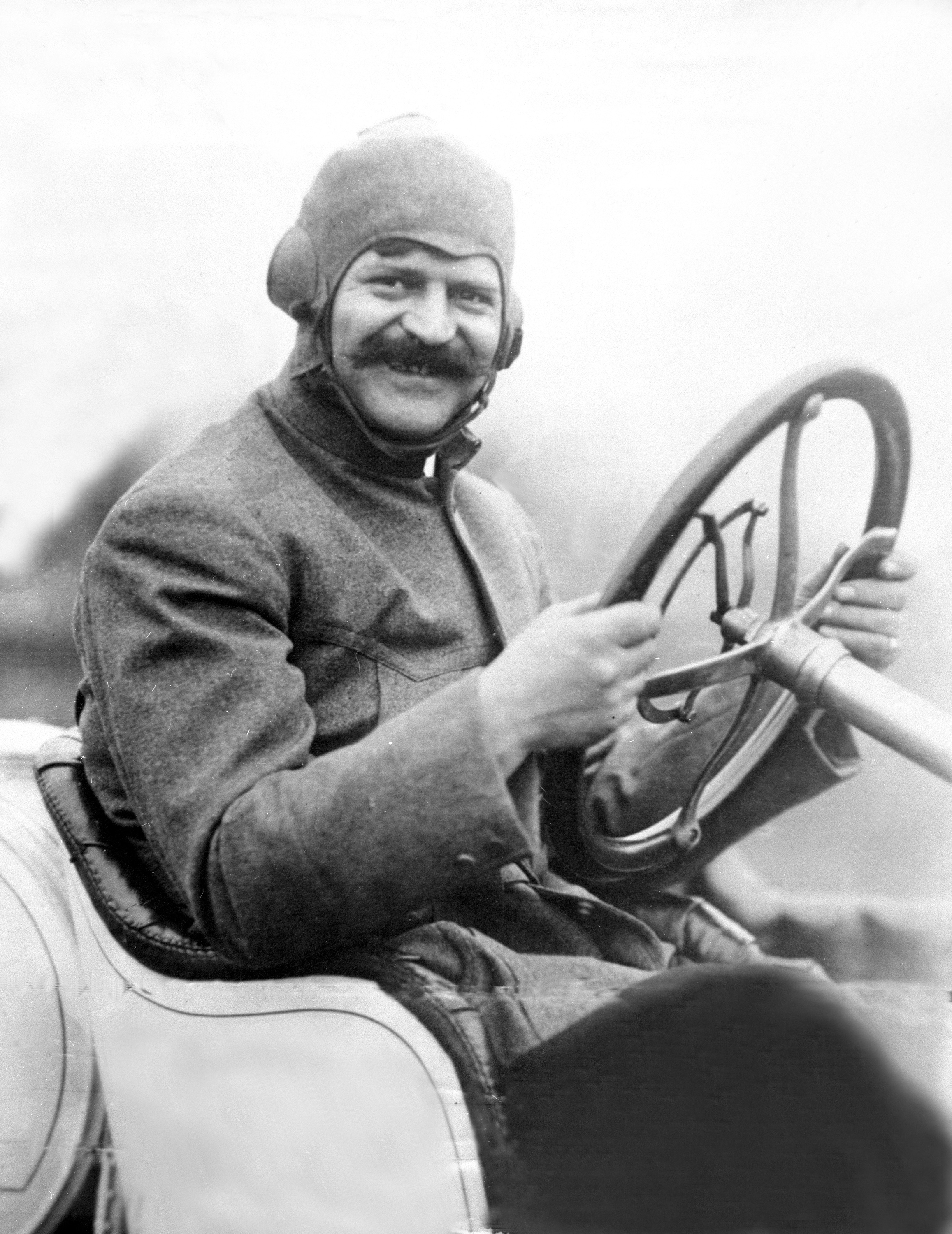
Chevrolet in 1911

On November 3, 1911, Chevrolet co-founded the Chevrolet Motor Car Company with his brother Arthur Chevrolet, William C. Durant, and investment partners William Little (maker of the Little automobile) and Dr. Edwin R. Campbell, son-in-law of Durant and friend of Samuel McLaughlin of the McLaughlin Car Company of Canada Ltd. The company was established in Detroit. One story tells the choosing of the company's logo as a modified Swiss cross, to honor Chevrolet's homeland. Another story tells of the Chevrolet logo as a design taken from the wallpaper of a Paris hotel room where Louis once stayed.

Louis-Joseph Chevrolet had differences with William Durant over the car's design, and in 1915 sold Durant his share in the company and started McLaughlin's Company in Canada building Chevrolets. By 1916, the trading of Chevrolet stock for GM Holding stock enabled Durant to repurchase a controlling stake in General Motors, and by 1917 the Chevrolet company that Louis had co-founded was merged as a company into General Motors after the outstanding Chevrolet stocks were purchased from McLaughlin in 1918. The McLaughlin Car Company then merged with his Chevrolet Motor Company of Canada Ltd. to become General Motors of Canada Ltd. in 1918, prior to the incorporation of the General Motors Corporation in the United States when General Motors Company of New Jersey dissolved.

=== Frontenac and American car companies ===
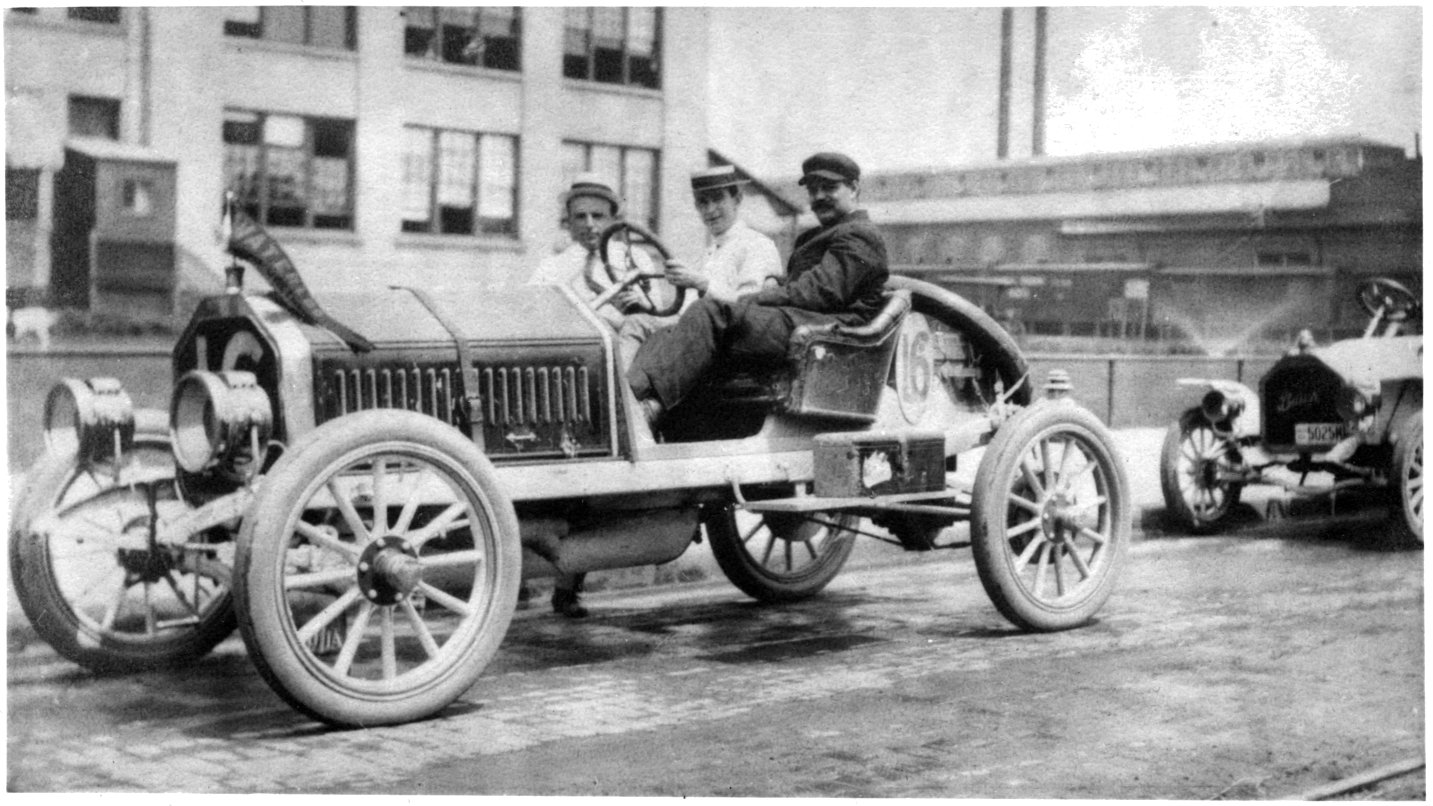
Chevrolet in a Frontenac he designed, circa 1914

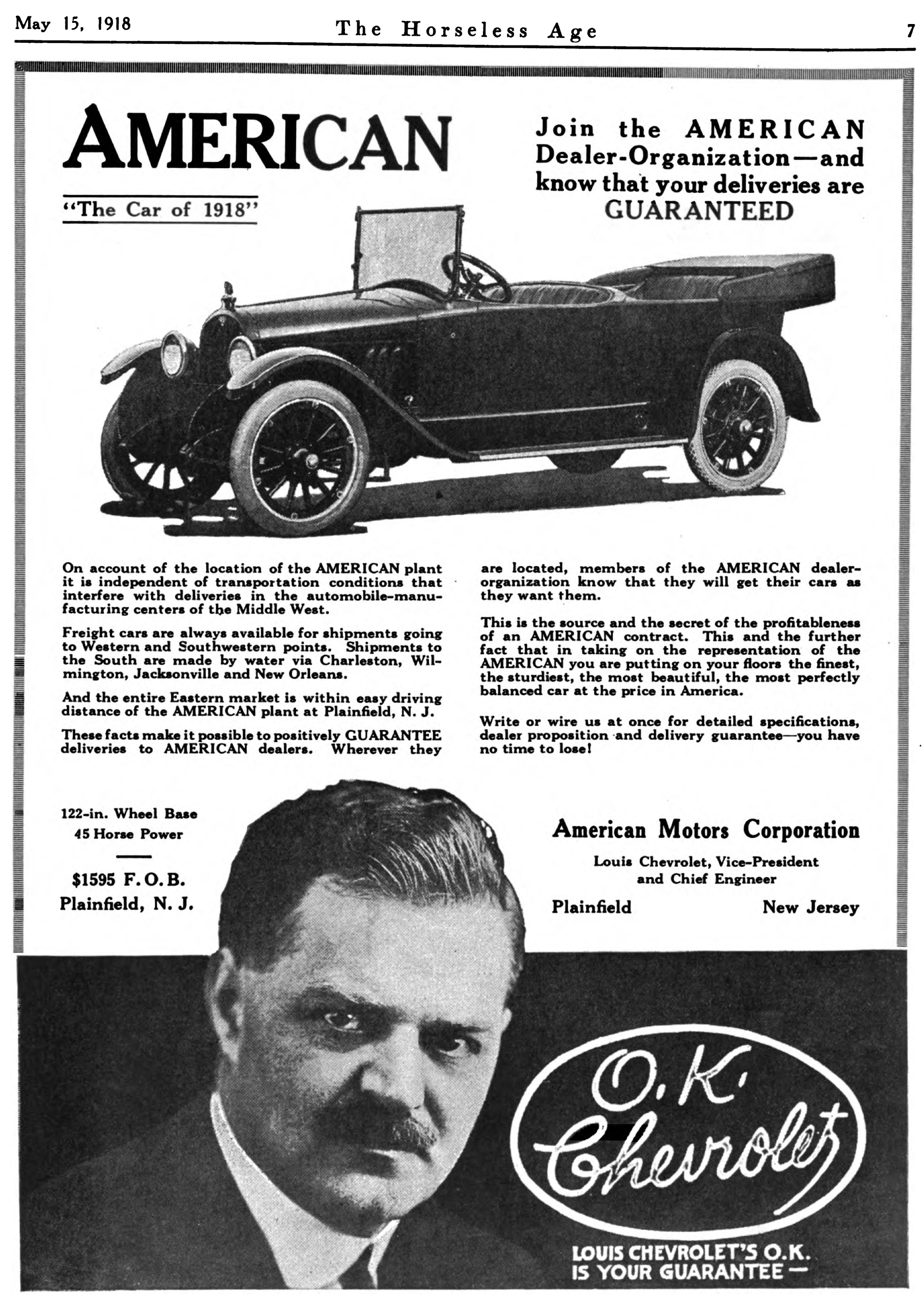
American Motors Corporation advertisement in the journal The Horseless Age, May 15, 1918

In 1916, Chevrolet and his brothers founded the Frontenac Motor Corporation to make racing parts for the Ford Model T.

Also in 1916, American Motors Corporation (unrelated to the later American Motors created by the 1954 merger of Nash-Kelvinator Corporation and Hudson Motor Car Company) was formed in Newark, New Jersey, with Louis Chevrolet as vice president and chief engineer. By 1918 it was producing cars in a plant at Plainfield, New Jersey. In 1923 it merged with the Bessemer Motor Truck Company of Pennsylvania into Bessemer-American Motors Corporation, which lasted less than a year before merging with the Winther and Northway companies into Amalgamated Motors. The latter company apparently ceased soon after.

=== Auto racing ===
By the mid-1910s, Chevrolet had shifted into the car racing industry, partnering with Howard E. Blood of Allegan, Michigan, to create the Cornelian racing car, which he used to place 20th in the 1915 Indianapolis 500 automobile race. In 1916, he and his younger brothers Gaston and Arthur Chevrolet started Frontenac Motor Corporation, designing and producing a line of racing cars. They became well known for, among other things, their Fronty-Ford racers.

Chevrolet drove in the Indianapolis 500 four times, with a best finish of seventh in 1919. Both Louis and Gaston competed successfully with racing Sunbeams, achieving a number of third places in 1916. Arthur competed twice, and Gaston won the Indianapolis 500 in 1920 in one of their Frontenacs, going on to win the 1920 AAA National Championship. He also raced for the Buick racing team.

=== Later life ===
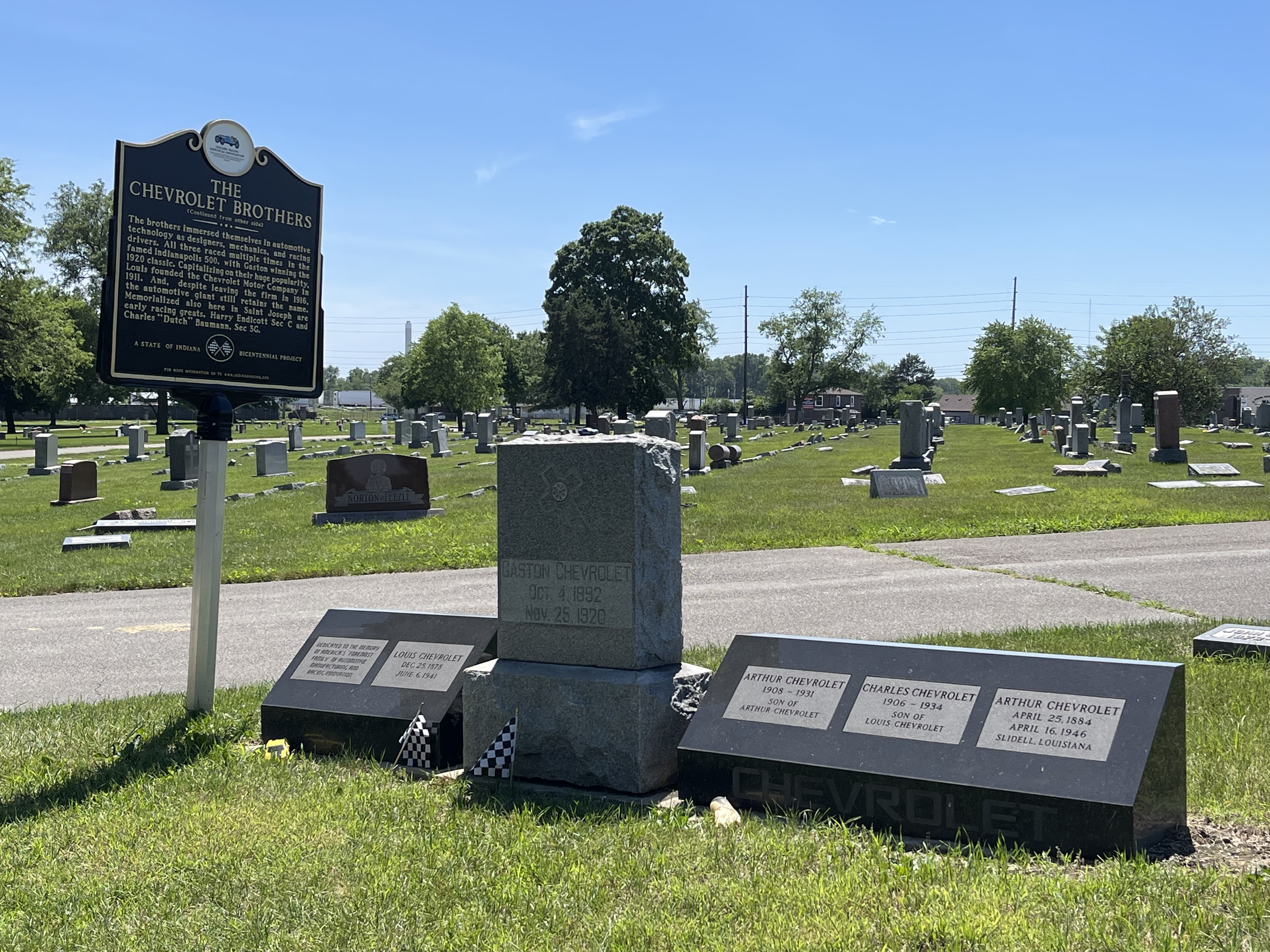
The gravesite of the Chevrolet brothers, including Louis, at Holy Cross and Saint Joseph Cemetery, Indianapolis, Indiana.

In 1927, Chevrolet launched the aircraft engine construction company Chevrolair, which failed three years later as a result of the Great Depression. He returned to Chevrolet to work as mechanic in the Detroit factories.

Louis-Joseph Chevrolet died on June 6, 1941, in Detroit due to a heart attack. His atherosclerosis had previously led to a leg amputation. He is buried in the Holy Cross and Saint Joseph Cemetery in Indianapolis, Indiana.

== Personal life ==
In 1905, Chevrolet married French-born Suzanne Estelle Treyvoux (1888–1966), a daughter of Louis Antoine Treyvoux, a furrier originally from Paris, and Marie Treyvoux (née Burlat). They emigrated to the United States in 1904. They had three children;

- Charles Louis Chevrolet (1906–1934), industrial draftsman, married Anne Blessing (born 1906), they had one daughter Renee Chevrolet Goeke (1929–2018), who was the only granddaughter of Louis Chevrolet.
- Alfred Joseph Chevrolet (1912–1971), married Rose Germaine Kish (1913–2009), they did not have children.
- Clara Chevrolet

Chevrolet became a naturalized American citizen in 1915.

== Awards and honors ==
Chevrolet has been inducted into the following halls of fame:

- Auto Racing Hall of Fame (1952)
- Automotive Hall of Fame (1969)
- Michigan Motor Sports Hall of Fame (1984)
- National Sprint Car Hall of Fame (1990)
- International Motorsports Hall of Fame (1992)
- Motorsports Hall of Fame of America (1995)

In addition, the Indianapolis Motor Speedway Museum in Speedway, Indiana, features a memorial at the entrance to the building dedicated to the accomplishments of Chevrolet. The memorial, designed by Fred Wellman and sculpted by Adolph Wolter, was created during 1968–1970 and installed in the spring of 1975. The centerpiece of the memorial is a bronze bust of Chevrolet wearing a racing cap and goggles; it rests on a marble and granite square base.

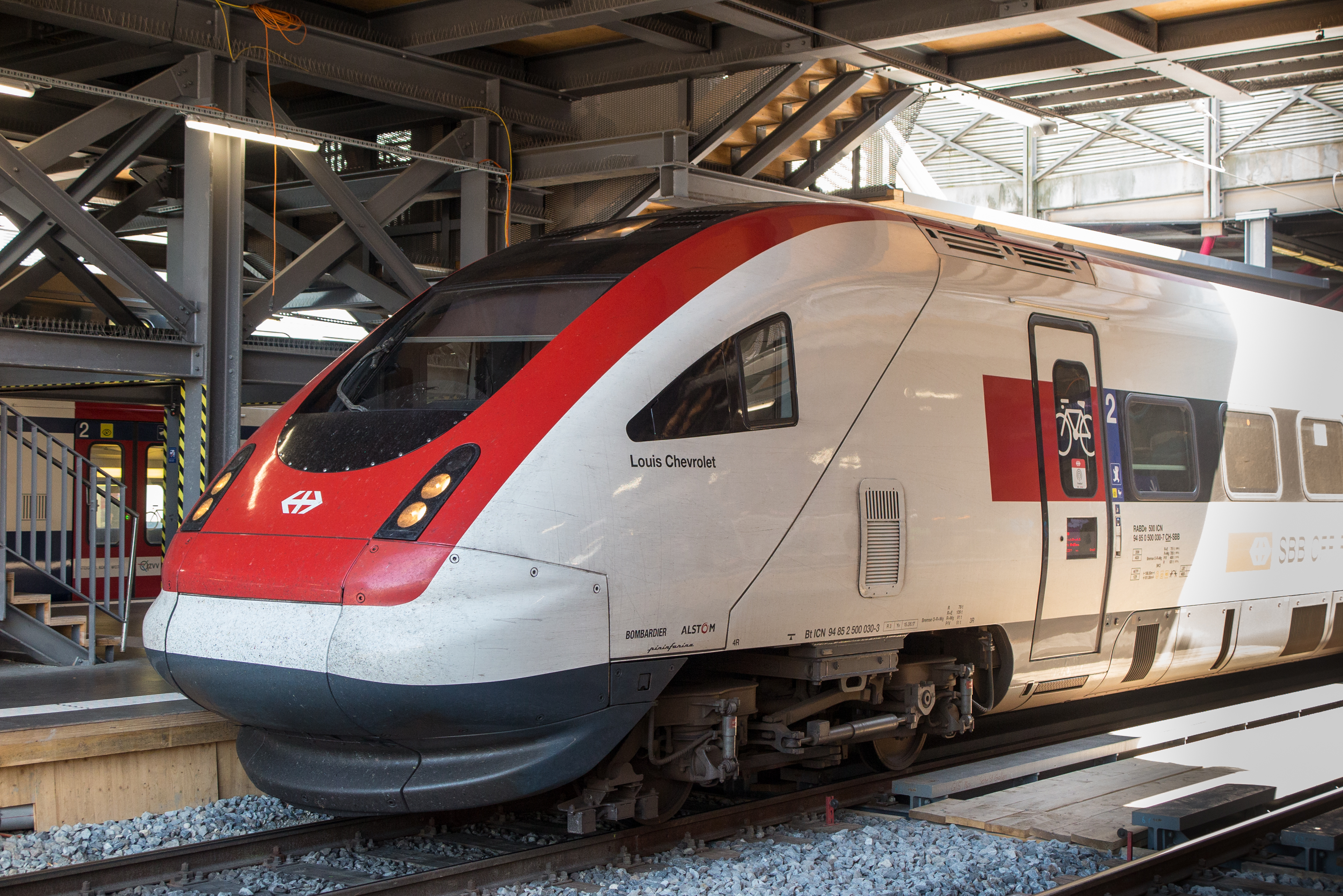
SBB RABdE2 ICN is named after Chevrolet.

The Swiss national train company, SBB, has named one of its long distance ICN-Trains after Louis Chevrolet. The train family operates primarily on the East-West axis, also serving Chevrolet's home town, La Chaux-de-Fonds.

== Motorsports career results ==
=== Indianapolis 500 results ===
Year	Car	Start	Qual	Rank	Finish	Laps	Led	Retired
1915	27	23	81.010	23	20	76	0	Valve
1916	8	21	87.690	13	12	82	0	Rod
1919	7	12	103.100	2	7	200	9	Running
1920	3	3	96.300	3	18	94	0	Steering
Totals						452	9	

Starts	4
Poles	0
Front Row	1
Wins	0
Top 5	0
Top 10	1
Retired	3
