= Barney Oldfield =

American racing driver (1878–1946)

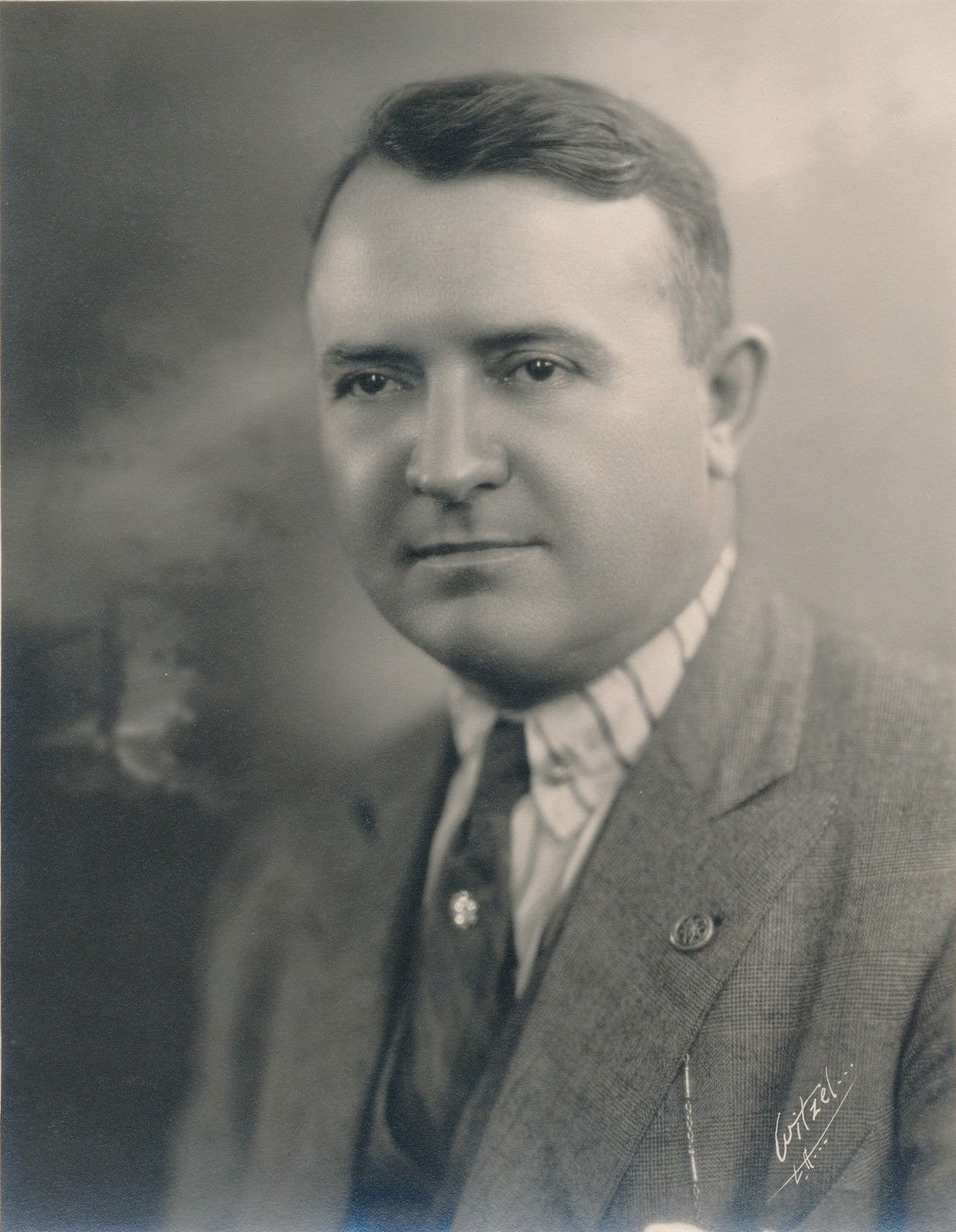
- Oldfield, c. 1920
- Born: Berna Eli Oldfield; January 29, 1878 near Wauseon, Ohio, U.S.
- Died: October 4, 1946 (aged 68) Beverly Hills, California, U.S.

Championship titles
- AAA Championship Car (1905)

Champ Car career
- 49 races run over 10 years
- Best finish: 1st (1905)
- First race: 1905 Hartford Race (Charter Oak Park)
- Last race: 1918 Liberty Sweepstakes (Uniontown)
- First win: 1905 Hartford Race (Charter Oak Park)
- Last win: 1915 Tucson Race (Tucson)
Wins	Podiums	Poles
8	17	1

Berna Eli "Barney" Oldfield (January 29, 1878 – October 4, 1946) was a pioneer American racing driver. His name was "synonymous with speed in the first two decades of the 20th century". He was the winner of the inaugural AAA National Championship in 1905.

After success in bicycle racing, Oldfield began auto racing in 1902 and continued until his retirement in 1918. He was the first man to drive a car at 60 miles per hour (96 km/h) on a circular track.

== Early life ==
Oldfield was born in York Township, Fulton County, Ohio, near Wauseon and Toledo, on January 29, 1878, to Henry Clay Oldfield, a laborer, and his wife Sarah. He was named after his father's bunkmate in the 68th Ohio Volunteer Infantry during the American Civil War. He had a sister Bertha.

As of the 1880 United States census, the Oldfields lived in Wauseon. In 1889, they moved to Toledo, where Henry got a job at the state mental asylum. In the summer of 1891, Oldfield worked as a waterboy in order to purchase his first bicycle. According to legend, he spent most of his Sunday afternoons at the local Toledo fire station, hoping for the next call. As the company's “mascot,” he was allowed to ride the big red hose wagon, pulled by a pair of horses that raced through the streets. The following year, Oldfield worked after school selling the Toledo Blade and Toledo Bee newspapers.

Oldfield dropped out of school after the eighth grade in 1892. He started working with his father as a kitchen helper at the mental asylum during the day and a bellhop at the downtown hotel at night. He eventually worked at the hotel full-time, as he preferred it to working around mental patients. Purportedly the bell captain said that "Berna” was "a sissy name," so he changed it to “Barney." Oldfield was described as having a "magnetic personality", and received many tips at the hotel. He used them to buy his second bike, an "Advance Traveller" with pneumatic tires.

== Racing career ==
=== Bicycle ===
Clarence Brigham, who sold the “Cleveland” brand bike, and Edward G. Eager (of Eager & Green Mercantile) who sold the “Columbia” models in his store, organized the Wauseon Cycle Club in their town. They wanted both to increase bicycle sales and draw more people to the town via the Michigan Lake Shore Railroad. Other cycling groups in Swanton, Clyde, Monroe, Adrian, Blissfield, and Toledo were part of the same cycle racing circuit.

Bicyclists raced in half-mile and mile classes on public racetracks usually reserved for horse racing. Other members of the Club included Fred Ballmeyer, Ora Brailey, Curt and Buff Harrison, Doc Myers, Emil Winzeler, Doc Miley, Frank Harper, Dan Raymond (who fixed everyone's bikes), Sid Black (a trick cyclist from Cleveland who later became president of the Packard Motor Company), and Barney Oldfield. In October 1892, the second “Silver Tournament” was held in Wauseon.

In 1893, Oldfield began working as an elevator operator at a different hotel. Every night he stored one hotel tenant's lightweight "Cleveland" cycle in the basement; he sometimes "borrowed it", riding it at night.

At age 16, Oldfield began serious bicycle racing in 1894 after officials from the "Dauntless" bicycle factory asked him to ride for the Ohio state championship. Although he came in second, the race was a turning point. Oldfield was hired as a parts sales representative for the Syracuse, New York, based Stearns bicycle factory. There he met Beatrice Lovetta Oatis, his future wife; they married in 1896.

By 1896, Oldfield was paid by Stearns to race on its amateur team.

=== Automobile ===
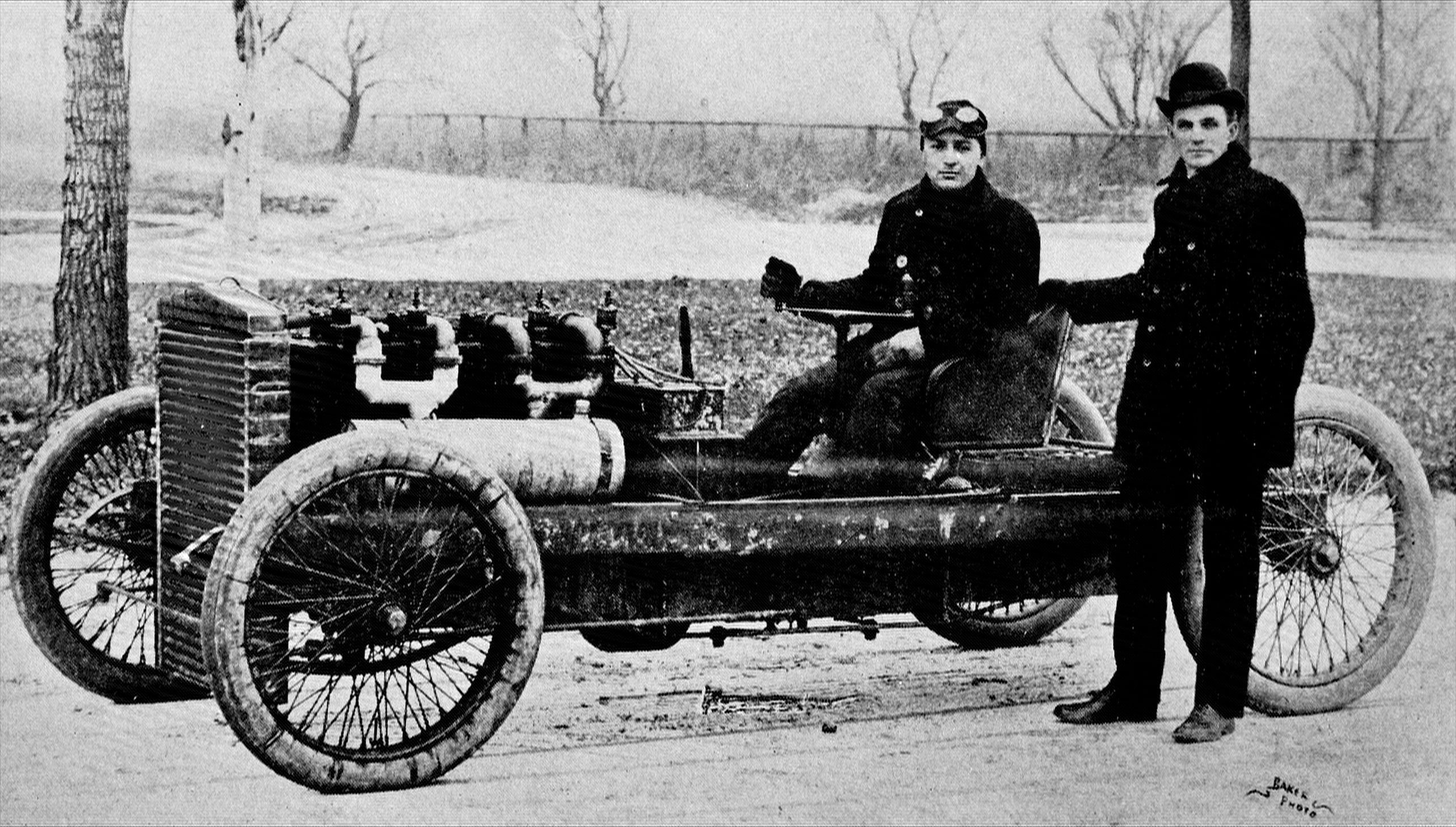
Henry Ford standing next to Oldfield's first car in 1902

Oldfield was loaned a gasoline-powered bicycle to race at Salt Lake City. Through fellow racer Tom Cooper, he met entrepreneur Henry Ford, who was at the beginning of his career as an auto manufacturer in Michigan. Ford had prepared two automobiles for racing, and he asked Oldfield if he would like to test one in Michigan. Oldfield agreed and traveled to Michigan for the trial, but neither car started. Although Oldfield had never driven an automobile, he and Cooper bought both test vehicles when Ford offered to sell them for $800. One was "No. 999", which debuted in October 1902 at the Manufacturer's Challenge Cup. Today it is displayed at the Henry Ford Museum in Greenfield Village, Michigan.

Oldfield agreed to drive against the current champion, Alexander Winton. Oldfield was rumored to have learned how to operate the controls of the "999" only the morning of the event. Oldfield won by a half mile in the five-mile (8 km) race. He slid through the corners like a motorcycle racer rather than braking. It was a great victory for Ford and resulted in both Oldfield and Ford becoming nationally known.

John Wilkinson, who designed an air-cooled engine for Franklin Automobile Company and was its chief engineer, raced against Oldfield in 1902. He won the state 5 miles (8.0 km) championship in a record time of 6:54:06.

On June 20, 1903, at the Indiana State Fairgrounds, Oldfield became the first driver to run a mile track in one minute flat, or 60 miles per hour (97 km/h). Two months later, he drove one mile in 55.8 seconds at the Empire City Race Track in Yonkers, New York.

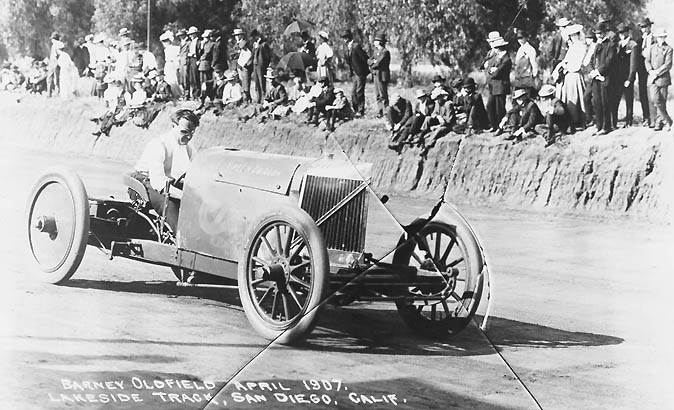
Oldfield driving the Peerless "Green Dragon" at Lakeside Track in San Diego, California, in April 1907

Alexander Winton hired Oldfield as a professional driver and agreed to supply him with free cars for racing. Oldfield, his manager Ernest Moross, and his agent Will Pickens traveled throughout the United States in a series of timed runs and match races, and he earned a reputation as a showman, racing while holding a cigar in his mouth to cushion the spot where he had broken some molar teeth in a crash. Oldfield was "the first American to become a celebrity solely for his ability to drive a car with great skill, speed, and daring." He liked to increase the drama in the best of three matches: he would win the first part by a nose, lose the second, and win the third.

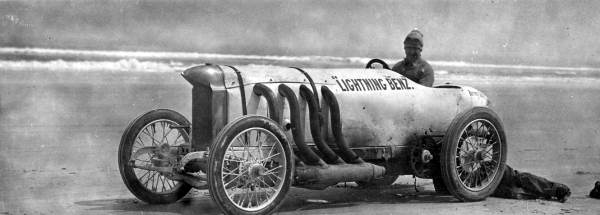
Barney Oldfield sitting in his Blitzen Benz at Daytona (undated)

Oldfield bought a Benz,dubbed the "Blitzen Benz", and won first place at the Indianapolis Motor Speedway on August 21, 1909. He raised his speed in 1910 to 70.159 mph (112.910 km/h) while driving his Benz. Later in 1910, Oldfield reached the speed of 131.25 mph (211.23 km/h). At Daytona Beach, Florida, on March 16, 1910, he set the world speed record in his Benz, driving 131.724 mph, for which he earned the nickname “speed king.”

==== Suspension and later career ====
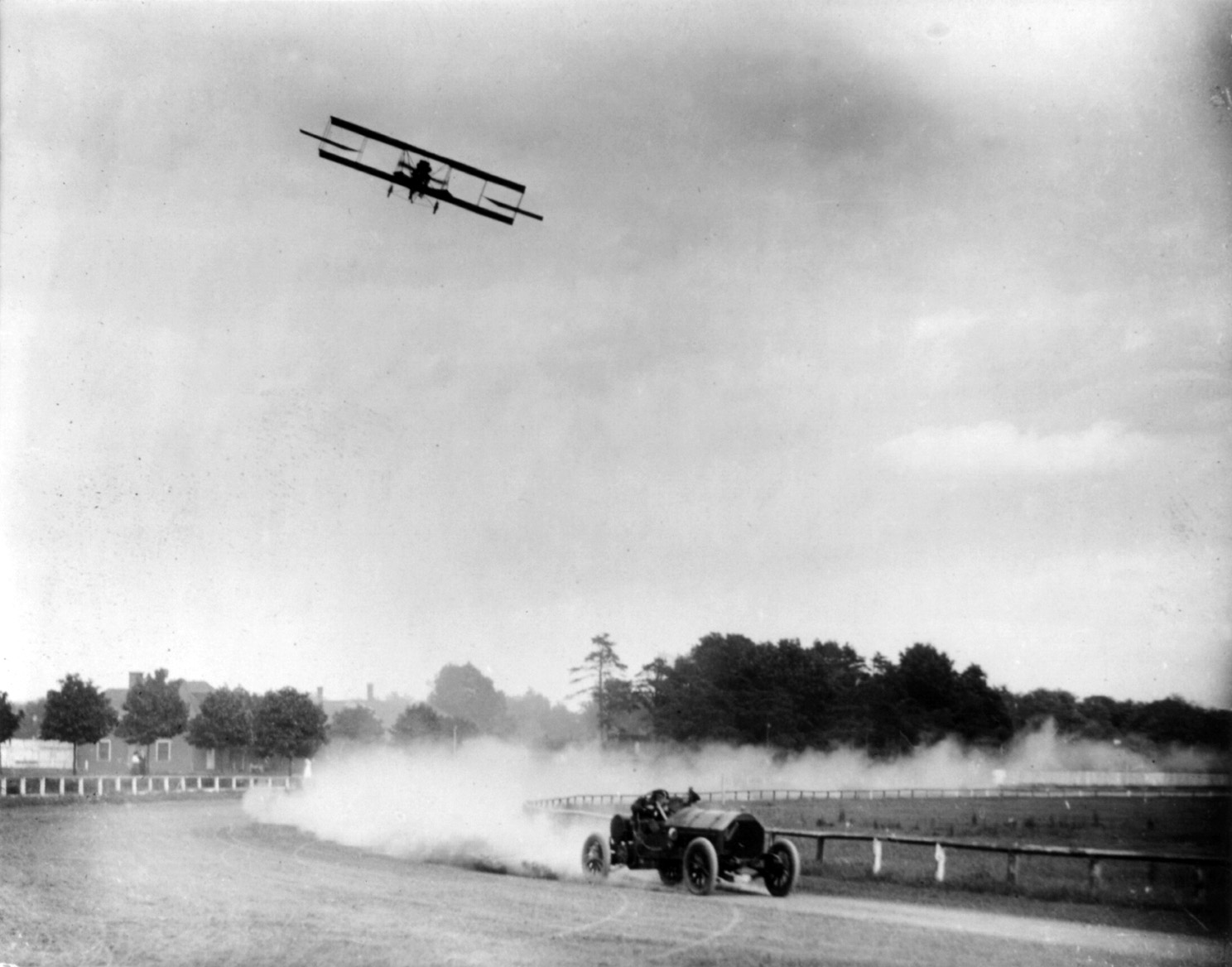
Oldfield racing against aviator Lincoln Beachey

Oldfield was suspended by the American Automobile Association (AAA) contest board for his "outlaw" racing, and was unable to race at sanctioned events for much of his career. He made his career by being paid to set speed records and conduct match races and exhibitions.

In 1914, Oldfield's agent Will Pickens staged a "Championship of the Universe", pitting Oldfield against another of his clients, aviator Lincoln Beachey. Oldfield raced his Fiat car against Beachey's biplanes in at least 35 matches, barnstorming the country. In the more remote areas, they raced at county fair horse tracks. The Championship was "extremely successful", and both Oldfield and Beachey earned more than $250,000 in their barnstorming.

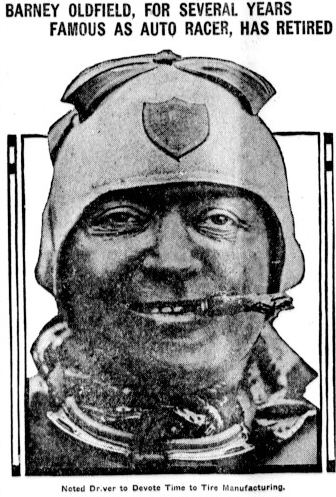
Barney Oldfield

After being reinstated by the AAA, Oldfield competed in the 1914 and 1916 Indianapolis 500, finishing fifth in each attempt. He was the first person to run a 100-mile-per-hour lap. His 1914 Indy finish was in an Indianapolis-built Stutz, and he was the highest-finishing driver in an American car in a race that was dominated by European brands.

Oldfield used the same car in his victory at the Los Angeles to Phoenix off-road race in November 1914. Oldfield also finished second in two major road races that year, the Vanderbilt Cup and the Corona 300. In 1915 he won the Venice, California 300 road race.

In November 1914, Oldfield won the Los Angeles-to-Phoenix Cactus Derby Race; the victor's medal proclaimed him “Master Driver of the World”. On May 28, 1916, he became the first person to lap the Indianapolis Speedway at more than 100 mph, in the front-wheel-drive "Christie Racer", designed by John Walter Christie. He used the Blitzen Benz to break the existing mile, two-mile, and kilometer records at the Daytona Beach Road Course at Ormond, Florida. Afterward, he charged $4,000 for each of his appearances at driving races.

In June 1917, Oldfield used his Golden Submarine, designed with a roll bar to protect the driver, to beat fellow racing legend Ralph DePalma in a series of 10- to 25-mile (40 km) match races at Milwaukee.

Oldfield retired from racing in 1918 but continued to tour and make movies. In what was his last attempt at racing, in 1932 he tried to re-enter speed racing with a new car design, but was unable to find any financial sponsors.

== Other ventures ==
=== Entertainment ===
Oldfield starred as himself for ten weeks in the Broadway musical The Vanderbilt Cup (1906).

Oldfield also appeared in movies, including the silent film Barney Oldfield's Race for a Life (1913), where he raced against a train to rescue a heroine tied to the train tracks. He appeared as himself in the Charley Chase short Young Oldfield (1924), and in the feature film The First Auto (1927) as an early pioneer of the automotive history. He was a technical advisor for the Vanderbilt Cup sequence in Back Street (1941). He starred as himself in a racing film Blonde Comet (1941), the story of a young woman trying to achieve success as a racecar driver.

=== Racing safety ===
Bob Burman, one of Oldfield's rivals and closest friends, was killed in a wreck during a race in Corona, California. Oldfield and Harry Arminius Miller, who developed and built carburetors and was one of the most famous engine builders, worked after that to design a racecar that was not only fast and durable but would protect the driver in the event of an accident. They built a racecar with a roll cage inside a streamlined driver's compartment, which completely enclosed the driver, calling it the "Golden Submarine."

=== Business ===
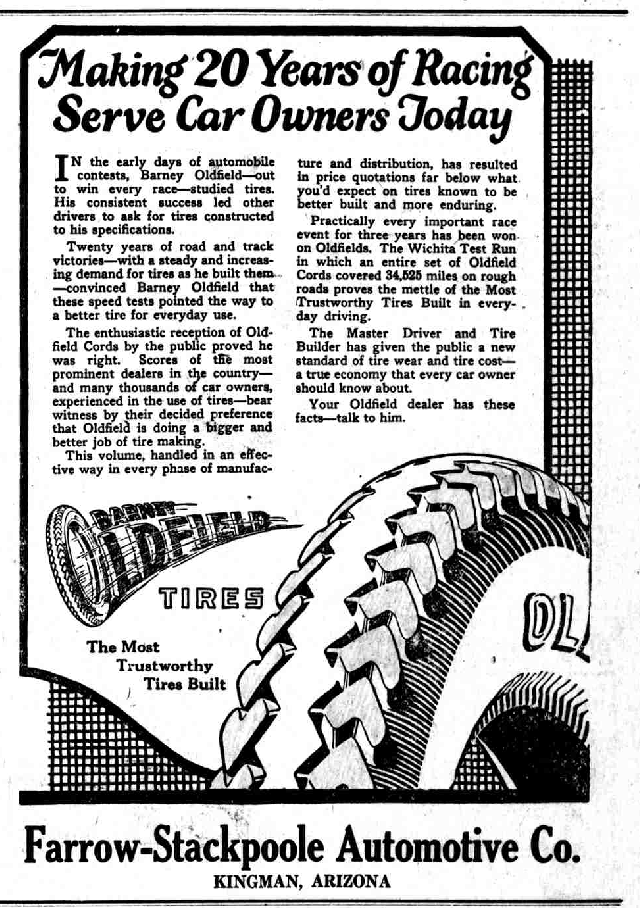
Barney Oldfield tire ad from 1922

Oldfield helped fellow racer Carl G. Fisher found the Fisher Automobile Company in Indianapolis. This is widely considered the first automobile dealership in the United States.

Oldfield also developed what was called the Oldfield tire for Firestone. In its slogan, Firestone touted that Oldfield had said, "Firestone Tires are my only life insurance". In 1924, the Kimball Truck Co. of Los Angeles built the only 1924 Oldfield.

== Personal life and death ==
Oldfield died on October 4, 1946, of a heart attack. He had married a total of four times. He was survived by Bessie Gooby Oldfield, whom he had divorced in 1924 and remarried in 1945, making her both his second and fourth wife. When they were first married, they adopted a daughter, Betty (who by his death was married to a Kelly). He was buried in the Holy Cross Cemetery in Culver City, California.

== Awards and honors ==
Oldfield has been inducted into the following halls of fame:

- Auto Racing Hall of Fame (1952)
- Automotive Hall of Fame (1968)
- Michigan Motor Sports Hall of Fame (1985)
- Motorsports Hall of Fame of America (1989)
- International Motorsports Hall of Fame (1990)
- National Sprint Car Hall of Fame (1990)
- Saginaw County Hall of Fame (2014)

In addition, Oakshade Raceway in Wauseon, Ohio - located close to Oldfield's birthplace - has held a race named in his honor since 1990.

== In popular culture ==
- In the TV series I Love Lucy episode "Lucy Learns to Drive" (Season 4), Ethel remarks, "Oh, pardon me, Barney Oldfield."
- In the TV series Dennis the Menace episode "The Soapbox Derby," Mrs. Wilson tells Mr. Wilson, "You're a regular Barney Oldfield"
- In the TV series The Partridge Family (Season 1, Episode 3), “Who do you think that you are, Barney Oldfield?”
- In the TV series Q.E.D. episode "The Great Motor Race," Oldfield is portrayed by Jeff Harding.
- Apollo 16 astronaut Charles Duke remarked about Oldfield in reference to astronaut John Young's driving of the lunar rover on the Moon in 1972. "Indy has never seen a driver like this-Barney Oldfield," quipped Duke.

== Motorsports career results ==
=== Indianapolis 500 results ===
Year	Car	Start	Qual	Rank	Finish	Laps	Led	Retired
1914	3	30	87.250	24	5	200	0	Running
1916	15	5	94.330	5	5	120	0	Running
Totals						320	0	

Starts	2
Poles	0
Front Row	0
Wins	0
Top 5	2
Top 10	2
Retired	0
