= Lincoln (1914 automobile) =

Defunct American motor vehicle manufacturer

The Lincoln was a cyclecar or light car built in Detroit, Michigan by the Lincoln Motor Car Company in 1914.

== History ==
The Lincoln Motor Car Company was a name changing from the American Motorette Company. Like the American Voiturette Company it were set up by former Keeton officials. The car was called the Lincoln Highway.

The Highway Model was a brass era roadster with seating for three passengers, one sitting in front of the driver. The body used a Renault style hood on a 100-inch wheelbase. It had a 4-cylinder engine and weighed 1,050 lb (480 kg), and sold for $595, equivalent to $16,071 in 2025. Production was very limited.
