= Moross =

Moross may refer to:

- Aries Moross, London-based designer and illustrator
- Ernest Moross, motorsport press agent
- Jerome Moross, American-born composer
- Kelly Moross Craft, United States Ambassador to the United Nations and United States Ambassador to Canada
- Moross House, oldest surviving brick house in Detroit, Michigan
