= Bob Burman =

American racing driver (1884–1916)

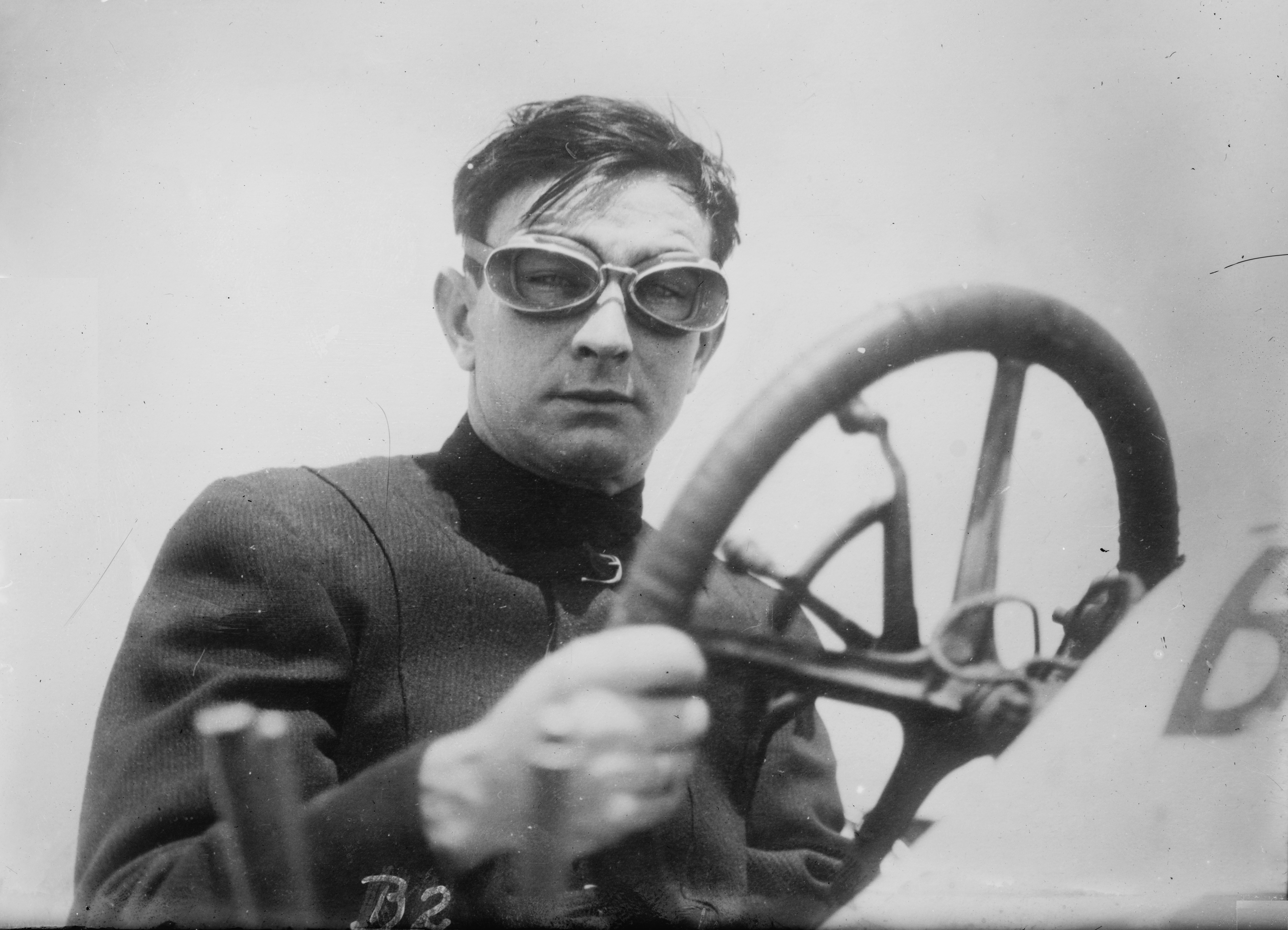
- Burman in 1911
- Born: Robert R. Burman; April 23, 1884 Imlay City, Michigan, U.S.
- Died: April 8, 1916 (aged 31) Riverside, California, U.S.

Champ Car career
- 41 races run over 7 years
- First race: 1909 Indiana Trophy (Crown Point)
- Last race: 1915 Harkness Gold Medal (Sheepshead Bay)
- First win: 1909 Prest-O-Lite Trophy (Indianapolis)
- Last win: 1915 Burlington 100 (Burlington)
Wins	Podiums	Poles
6	15	0

Robert R. Burman (April 23, 1884 – April 8, 1916) was an American racing driver. He was an open-wheel pioneer, setting numerous speed records in the early 1900s. He participated in many historic races and was one of the drivers to compete in the first edition of the Indianapolis 500 in 1911.

== Biography ==
Burman was born in Imlay City, Michigan on April 23, 1884. While working as a road tester for the Jackson Automobile Co. in 1906 he got the opportunity to enter several races, in which he performed well. In 1908 William C. Durant, the founder of General Motors, brought Burman and the Chevrolet brothers on as drivers for the newly formed Buick racing team.

Burman won the Prest-O-Lite Trophy Race, a precursor to the Indianapolis 500, in his Buick in 1909. He finished first in the 1909 Vesper Club Trophy Race driving for the Buick team and fourth in the 1909 Lowell Trophy Race. In 1910 he won the Remy Brassard Trophy 2 on the Indianapolis Motor Speedway and in 1911 he won the first four events at the New Orleans Mardi Gras Races with his Buick 60 Special.

Racing for promoter Ernest Moross, Burman set a land speed record at an average of 141.732 miles per hour (228.096 km/h) over distance of 0.625 miles (1 kilometer) in his 200-horsepower Blitzen Benz on the sands of Daytona Beach on April 23, 1911; however this record was not officially recognized by the AIACR in Paris. He competed at the first ever 1911 Indianapolis 500 in a Benz, before the race he made exhibition runs in the Blitzen Benz on the Indianapolis Motor Speedway and set speed records at the quarter mile, half mile, kilometer and mile distances. He was crowned speed king before the start of the race.

Burman competed in the 1912 Indianapolis 500, crashing his Cutting at the second turn after 157 laps. He started the 1913 Indianapolis 500 as the favorite, and led 41 laps early, but his car caught fire on lap 55; he was able to repair his Keeton and continued for a while, but eventually did not finish the race. In 1914, he won the Kalamazoo Race, and in 1915 he won both the Oklahoma Southern Sweepstakes Road Race and the Burlington Race in his Peugeot L76. He finished sixth in the 1915 Indianapolis 500.

== Death ==
On April 8, 1916, during a non-championship Corona road race, Burman, along with his riding mechanic Erick Schrader, were killed when one of his rear tires exploded, causing his open-cockpit Peugeot car to roll. One of the guards hired to watch the racecourse, William Speer, along with three spectators were also killed, and five others were seriously injured. His death caused his friends Barney Oldfield and Harry Arminius Miller to join forces to build a race car that incorporated a roll cage inside a streamlined driver's compartment that completely enclosed the driver. It was called the Golden Submarine.

== Awards ==
Burman was inducted into the National Sprint Car Hall of Fame in 2011.

== Motorsports career results ==
=== Indianapolis 500 results ===
Year	Car	Start	Qual	Rank	Finish	Laps	Led	Retired
1911	45	39	—	—	19	126	0	Flagged
1912	15	12	84.110	7	12	157	0	Crash T2
1913	4	21	84.170	7	11	188	41	Flagged
1914	17	22	90.410	12	24	47	0	Rod
1915	8	7	92.400	7	6	200	0	Running
Totals						718	41	

Starts	5
Poles	0
Front Row	0
Wins	0
Top 5	0
Top 10	1
Retired	2

== Images ==
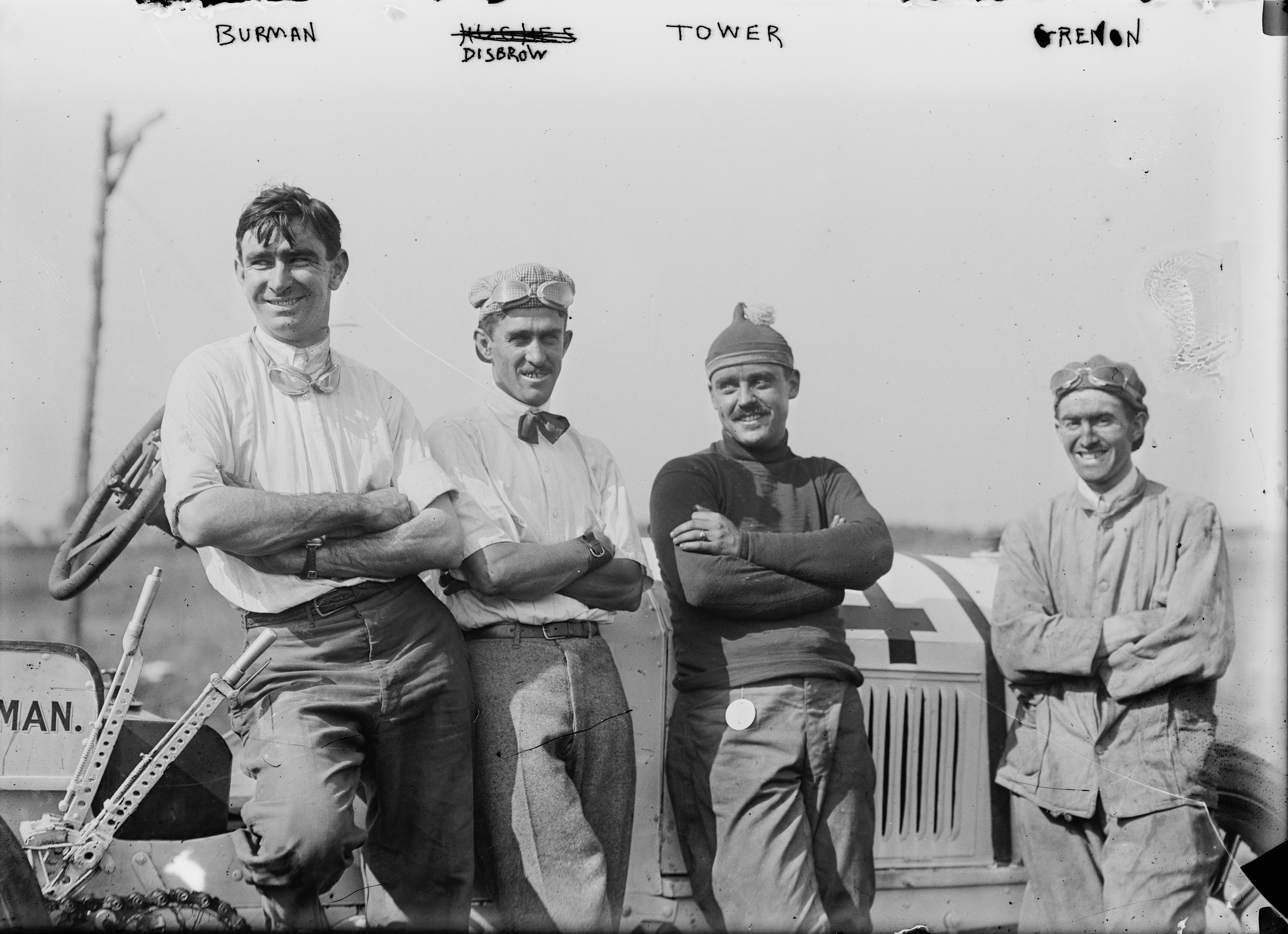
Bob Burman, Louis Disbrow, Jack Tower, and Joe Grennon at the 1911 Indianapolis 500

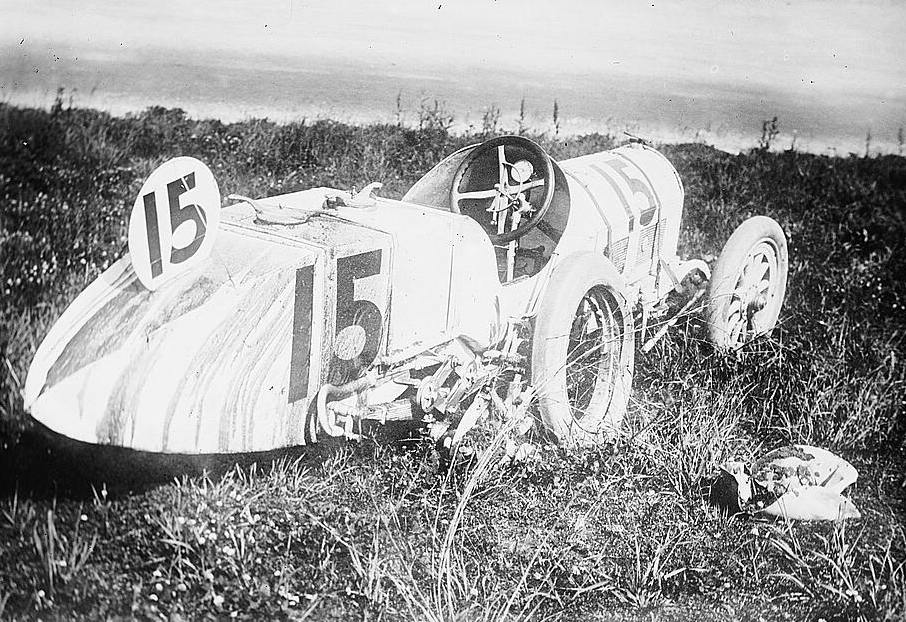
Burman's crashed Cutting racer, built by the Clark-Carter Automobile Company at the 1912 Indianapolis 500

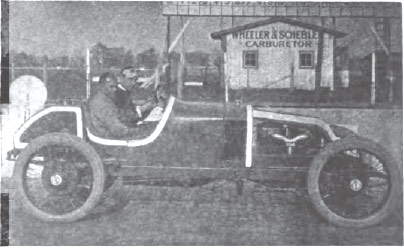
Bob Burman's Keeton racer finished 11th place at Indianapolis in 1913

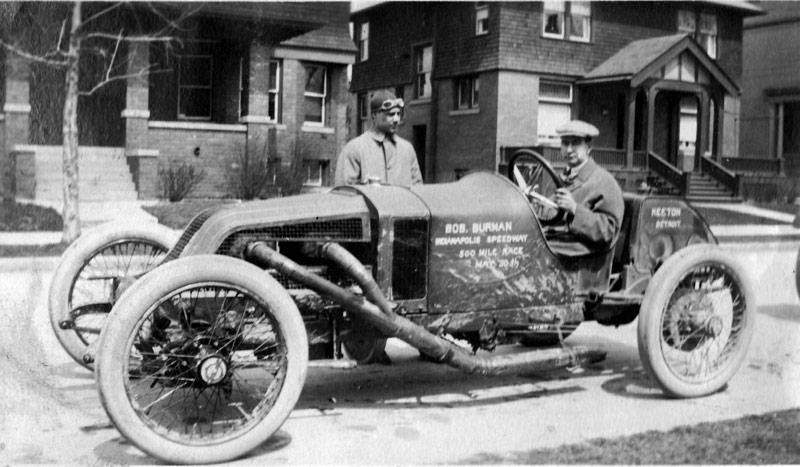
Bob Burman's Keeton racer photo taken by George L Mooney in 1913

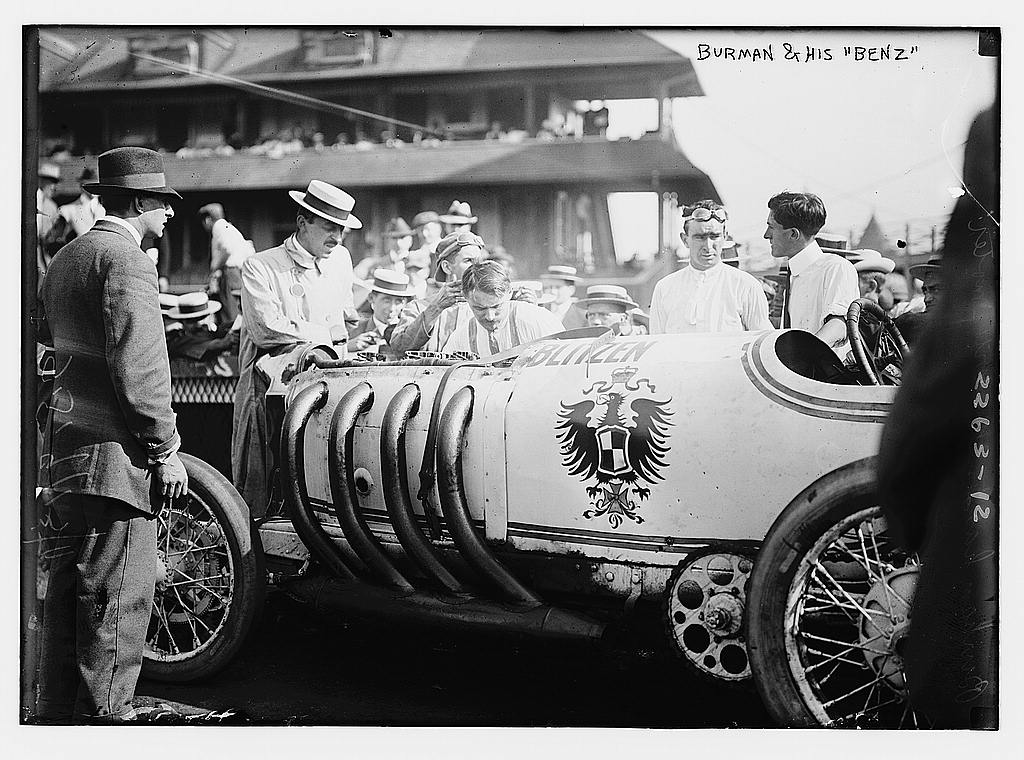
Race car driver Bob Burman and his Blitzen Benz, 1911

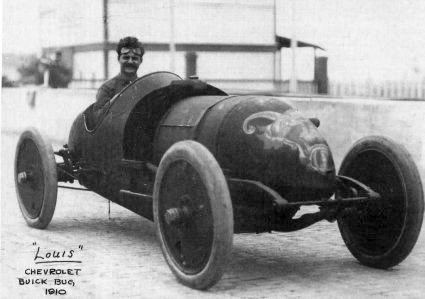
Chevrolet in Buick 60 special, as part of the Buick racing team in 1910
