= Buick 60 Special =

Early American racing car

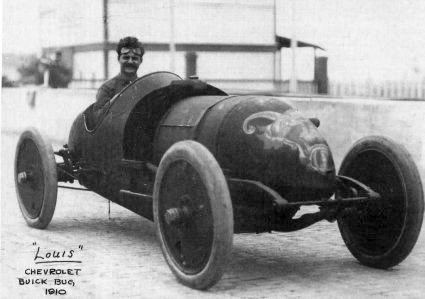
- Louis Chevrolet in his Buick 60 Special
- Constructor: Buick
- Designers: E.A. de Waters; Louis Chevrolet; Bob Burman
- Production: 1910

Technical specifications
- Axle track: 48.5 in (1,232 mm)
- Wheelbase: 102.5 in (2,604 mm)
- Engine: 622 cu in (10,193 cc) I4 Naturally-aspirated Front
- Transmission: 3 speed manual
- Weight: 2,600 lb (1,179.3 kg)
- Tires: 32" × 4" Firestone pneumatics
- Clutch: Leather-faced cone clutch

Competition history
- Notable drivers: Bob Burman; Louis Chevrolet

The Buick 60 Special is an early American racing car, two of which were built by Buick in 1910. It is one of the first US-built monopostos, having a single seat centered width-wise in the chassis. The car is nicknamed the Buick Bug.

== History ==
General Motors founder William Crapo "Billy" Durant pursued motor racing for its promotional and sales value, and brought the Chevrolet brothers and Bob Burman on as drivers. When the American Automobile Association's Contest Board discovered Buick entering custom-built racing cars in stock production racing classes, they disqualified these so-called "Buick Roadsters" on 27 May 1910. The Buick 60 Special was built in response to that disqualification.

The 60 Special was designed jointly by Chief Engineer Enos Anson (E.A.) de Waters, Louis Chevrolet, and Burman. Some of the tracings needed for parts designed for the car were done by Leo Goossen.

The car was built in the Buick Engineering department for the Buick Racing Team. Construction took just two or three weeks. Only two 60 Specials were built. Just twenty-five days passed between conception and the cars being unloaded at Indianapolis.

The 60 Special was among the first American-built racing cars without a seat for a riding mechanic, and that centered the driver laterally in the chassis.

According to Buick engineer Walter Marr, the ram's head painted on the nose was there to signal that Buick was "butting back into racing!"

Burman dubbed the car "The Space Eater", but the public called it the "Buick Bug". Burman was assigned to drive one, and Chevrolet the other.

Chevrolet's car suffered a roll-over crash at the Indianapolis Motor Speedway on 29 June 1910 due to a blown tire. Chevrolet attributed his survival to having ducked down into the car when it rolled, where he was protected by steel bands built into the car's hood. His car was repaired, but in 1911 it disappeared and its fate remains unknown. The surviving 60 Special is believed to be Burman's.

Some years after its retirement, the surviving 60 Special was found in a warehouse in Kansas City. Charles S. Howard, president of the Howard Automobile Company, a Buick distributorship, bought the car, possibly from Burman's widow, and showed it in 1920. Howard donated the car to the De Young Museum in San Francisco, then borrowed it back to display at his dealership. By 1940 the car had been restored by de Waters and his successor at Buick, Charles A. Chayne, in preparation for appearances at the Flint Motor Festival and New York World's Fair that year. Ownership of the 60 Special passed to Chayne, who later donated the car to the Sloan Museum. The car nevertheless remained on the inventory of the De Young until 1984, when a reporter from the San Francisco Examiner located it at the Sloan.

== Features ==
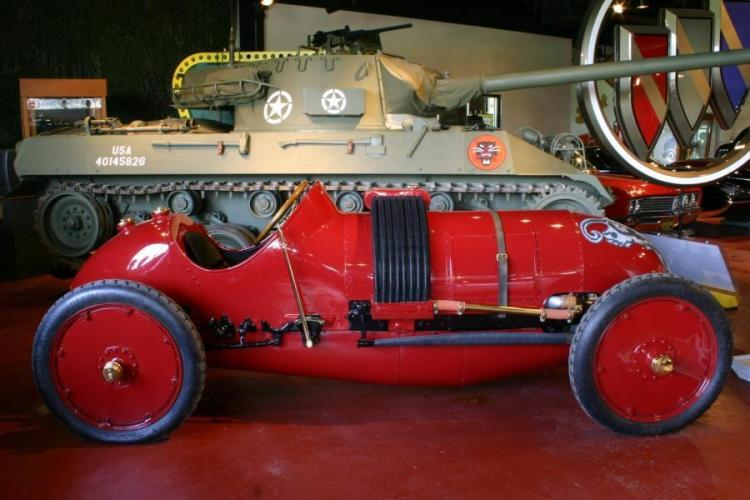
1910 Buick Bug at the Buick Gallery and Research Center

The car's engine is an inline four-cylinder with the cylinders cast in pairs. It is an example of Buick's "Valve-in-Head" engine, a design variously attributed to Walter Marr, David Dunbar Buick, and his assistant Eugene Richard. Bore and stroke are 6.0 in × 5.5 in (152 mm × 140 mm), for a total displacement of 622 cu in (10.2 L). It is equipped with a Bosch Dual Magneto firing two spark plugs per cylinder, and a Schebler carburetor. Four short exhaust pipes stub out of the left side of the engine cover, portending Buick's iconic porthole styling feature. Lubrication is by a combination of splash and pressurization. A small hand pump is provided so the driver can pressurize both the fuel tank and crankcase based on the readings of two gauges.

The "60" in the car's name represents the engine's power output, which was often reported as being in the range of 57–57.6 horsepower (42.5–43.0 kW). It is suggested that this was a deliberate and significant understating of the engine's capability. Its true output is elsewhere reported to be 144–145 hp (107.4–108.1 kW).

One noteworthy feature is the cooling system. Instead of a front-mounted rectangular radiator, heat from the engine is rejected by a series of finned tubes that arch over the car's body just ahead of the cowl. This allows the car to have a fully closed nose.

The car is equipped with a three-speed manual transmission. Total weight is 2,600 lb (1,179.3 kg)

The car is fitted with Dorian demountable rims shod with Firestone tires. The wooden-spoked artillery wheels have aluminum disc covers added to reduce drag.

Two braking systems are available to the driver. A floor-mounted brake pedal operates an externally contracting drum on the transmission, while a hand lever to the driver's right operates expanding brakes at each rear wheel. Even with these two systems, braking is inadequate.

Another flaw that became apparent later was that, at 48.5 in (1,232 mm), the car's tracks are so narrow that the car has a tendency to tip over when cornering hard.

== Racing history ==
During testing of both cars at Indianapolis on 1 July 1910, Burman's car set a measured top speed of 105.87 mph (170.38 km/h) on the straightaway. He captured quarter-mile trials with a time of 8.5 seconds, or 34 seconds for the mile, while Chevrolet won the mile trial at 35.84 seconds.

Burman won the first four events at the New Orleans Mardi Gras Races in 1911 with his 60 Special.

Also in 1911, Burman and his Bug won a 20 mi (32.2 km) Straightaway Free-for-all race at Jacksonville Beach, Florida at an average speed of 91.06 mph (146.55 km/h)."

In 1912 the remaining 60 Special made its final appearance at Brighton Beach in New York with driver Ray Howard. On that occasion it withdrew due to overheating."
