= Ernest Moross =

American motorsports promoter (died 1949)

Ernest "Ernie" Moross (1873 or 1874 – April 4, 1949) was an early-twentieth-century press agent and promoter specializing in American motorsports. He was a longtime associate of the first American auto racing superstar, Barney Oldfield. Moross also obtained distinction as the first Contest Director for the Indianapolis Motor Speedway. He left the Speedway in 1910 to campaign the Fiat racing team.

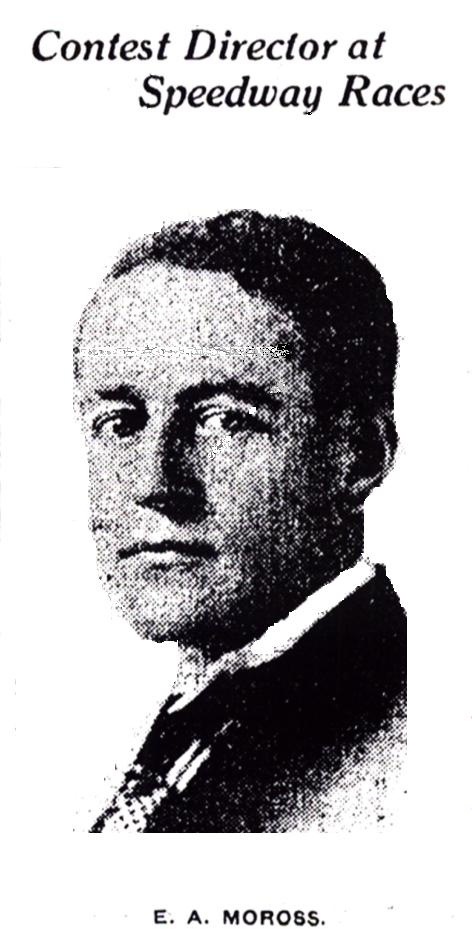
Ernest Moross in Indianapolis Star photo, May 27, 1910

== Early career ==
Like most of the pioneer American auto racers, Ernie Moross began his career racing bicycles on wooden velodromes in the 1890s. While there is no record of Moross enjoying exceptional success as an athlete, he is likely to have developed contacts with other participants, including Oldfield and Carl Graham Fisher who later founded the Indianapolis Motor Speedway in 1909.

== Work with Oldfield ==
Moross first began work with Barney Oldfield when the driver signed on to the Peerless racing team to drive the infamous "Green Dragon" racer in 1904. He formed the Moross Amusement Company and soon hired another noted promoter, William Pickens to act as front man for their operation. Moross made arrangements with county fair horse tracks and Pickens would paste broadsides on store fronts, telephone poles and barns to publicize the coming event. They traveled throughout the country attracting crowds full of people that in some cases had never seen an automobile. They were the leaders in the era's entertainment genre called "barnstorming". The events were more frequently staged than not and typically drew strong crowds of the curious. With Moross' help, Oldfield became a grassroots hero.

Moross brokered the deal for Oldfield to purchase the 1909 "Blitzen Benz," a 200-horsepower, chain drive 21.5 liter machine from the New York Benz Auto Import Company for $6,000 and the trade-in of an older, smaller Benz racer. Oldfield broke the world land speed record on the sands of Ormond-Daytona Beach at 131.7 MPH on March 16, 1910. Moross and Oldfield remained in contact throughout their lives.

== Director of Contests, Indianapolis Motor Speedway ==
Moross worked at the Speedway from 1909 to 1910. Moross was hired by Carl Fisher as his press agent almost immediately after work began to develop the terrain that would support the Speedway. It was Moross' idea to build a scale model of the track facing Crawfordsville Road so those passing the location could stop and get a feel for the layout. Moross promoted all the Indianapolis Motor Speedway events during 1909 and the first race meet on the newly brick-paved track in 1910. In addition, he was the starter of the first motorized event at the Speedway, the August 1909 motorcycle races. He was also responsible for engineering the first trip around the track by a woman. Journalist Betty Blythe rode "shotgun" with Bob Burman August 17, 1909, and then wrote a feature article about it that appeared in the Indianapolis Star the following day.

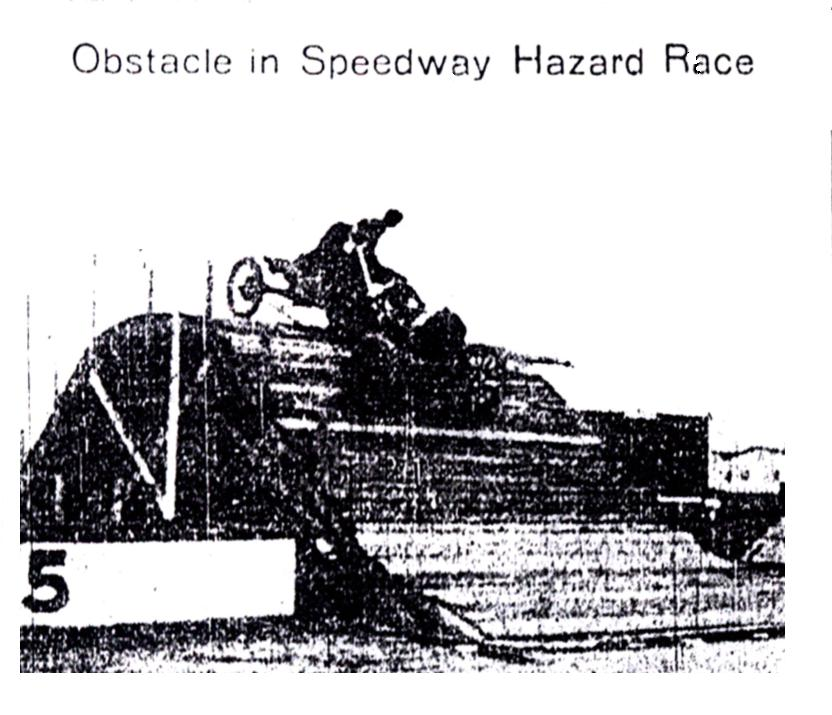
An obstacle course complete with wooden ramps and a path that traversed the Indianapolis Motor Speedway's landmark creek ditch in the southwest corner of the track was a featured event at the May 1910 race meet at the Brickyard.

Moross was also a key figure in the development of the May 1910 auto race meet at the Speedway, unique in its presentation of such odd events as an obstacle course contest that included wooden ramps and a trip through the Speedway's landmark ditch at the inside of the track's southwest turn.

== Work with Bob Burman and Teddy Tetzlaff ==
Moross purchased Oldfield's team for $13,500 before the 1911 season and shortly after the driver was suspended by the AAA for staging an unsanctioned match race at Sheepshead Bay against World Heavyweight Boxing Champion Jack Johnson in October 1910. The team featured the Blitzen Benz, a Knox Automobile and the Darracq that won the 1905 Vanderbilt Cup. Moross Amusement Company arranged for "Wild" Bob Burman to drive the car at Ormond-Daytona in April 1911, establishing a new record at over 141.73 MPH. The world land speed record was all Moross needed to create a money making exhibition show. Although the car's engine was far too large to meet the technical specifications of the first Indianapolis 500 in May 1911, the car made exhibition runs the morning of the race and set new track records at the quarter mile, half mile, kilometer and mile distances.

After these headline generating achievements, Moross, Burman and the Benz went on tour with a supporting cast of Louis Disbrow, Billy Knipper and H.J. Kilpatrick driving a Mercedes and a 1906 Grand Prix Hotchkiss. Moross and Burman continued to work together in 1912 and 1913, introducing a new 300 HP "Jumbo" Benz and set a new one mile dirt track record of 75.24 MPH at Brighton Beach in September.

In 1914 the Moross Amusement Company engaged Californian Teddy Tetzlaff to campaign the 300 HP Benz, naming it "Blitzen Benz 2." Tetzlaff broke the world land speed record mark by running 142.8 MPH on the Bonneville Salt Flats.
