= Indianapolis 500 =

Annual auto race held in Speedway, Indiana, US

Coordinates: 39°47′41″N 86°14′04″W

IndyCar Series
- Venue: Indianapolis Motor Speedway
- Location: Speedway, Indiana, U.S.
- Corporate sponsor: PennGrade Motor Oil (2016–2018); Gainbridge Insurance Agency (2019–present)
- First race: 1911
- First IndyCar race: 1996
- Distance: 500 miles (805 km)
- Laps: 200
- Previous names: 500-Mile International Sweepstakes (1911–1915, 1920–1941, 1946–1980); 300-Mile International Sweepstakes (1916); Liberty Sweepstakes (1919)
- Most wins (driver): A. J. Foyt (4); Al Unser (4); Rick Mears (4); Hélio Castroneves (4)
- Most wins (team): Penske (20)
- Most wins (manufacturer): Chassis: Dallara (27); Engine: Offenhauser (27); Tires: Firestone (77)

Circuit information
- Surface: Asphalt
- Length: 2.5 mi (4.0 km)
- Turns: 4
- Lap record: 37.895 sec (237.498 mph; 382.182 km/h) (Arie Luyendyk, Reynard/Ford-Cosworth XB, 1996)

The Indianapolis 500, commonly shortened to Indy 500, is an automobile race held annually at the Indianapolis Motor Speedway in Speedway, Indiana, United States, an enclave suburb of Indianapolis. The event is traditionally held over Memorial Day weekend, usually the last weekend of May. It is contested as part of the IndyCar Series, which is the top level of American open-wheel car racing, a formula colloquially known as "Indy Car Racing". The track itself is nicknamed the "Brickyard", as the racing surface was first paved in brick in the fall of 1909. One yard of brick remains exposed at the start/finish line of the track. The event, billed as The Greatest Spectacle in Racing, is considered part of the Triple Crown of Motorsport along with the 24 Hours of Le Mans and the Monaco Grand Prix, with which it has frequently shared a date.

The inaugural race was held in 1911 and it was won by Ray Harroun. The event celebrated its 100th anniversary in 2011, and the 100th running was held in 2016. The event was put on hiatus twice, from 1917 to 1918 due to World War I and from 1942 to 1945 due to World War II. In two different periods, the race was part of FIA World Championships; between 1925 and 1928, the World Manufacturers' Championship and between 1950 and 1960, the World Drivers' Championship.

Felix Rosenqvist, the winner in 2026, is the reigning champion. The most successful drivers all-time are A. J. Foyt, Al Unser Sr., Rick Mears and Hélio Castroneves, each of whom has won the race four times. The active driver with the most victories is Castroneves. Rick Mears holds the record for most career pole positions with six, and Scott Dixon holds the record for most career laps led. The most successful car owner is Roger Penske, owner of Team Penske, which has 20 total wins and 19 poles. Penske also has five wins at the Grand Prix of Indianapolis, held on the combined road course.

The event is steeped in tradition, in pre-race ceremonies, race procedure, and post-race celebrations. Among them are the 33-car starting grid lined up in rows of three, the annual singing of the chorus of "Back Home Again in Indiana", and the victory-lane bottle of milk. Qualifying requires the driver to complete four, rather than one, timed laps, and the time trials are conducted on a separate weekend. The official attendance is not disclosed by Speedway management, but the permanent seating capacity is roughly 235,000, and infield patrons raise typical race-day attendance to between 350,000 and 400,000.

== History ==
=== Early years ===
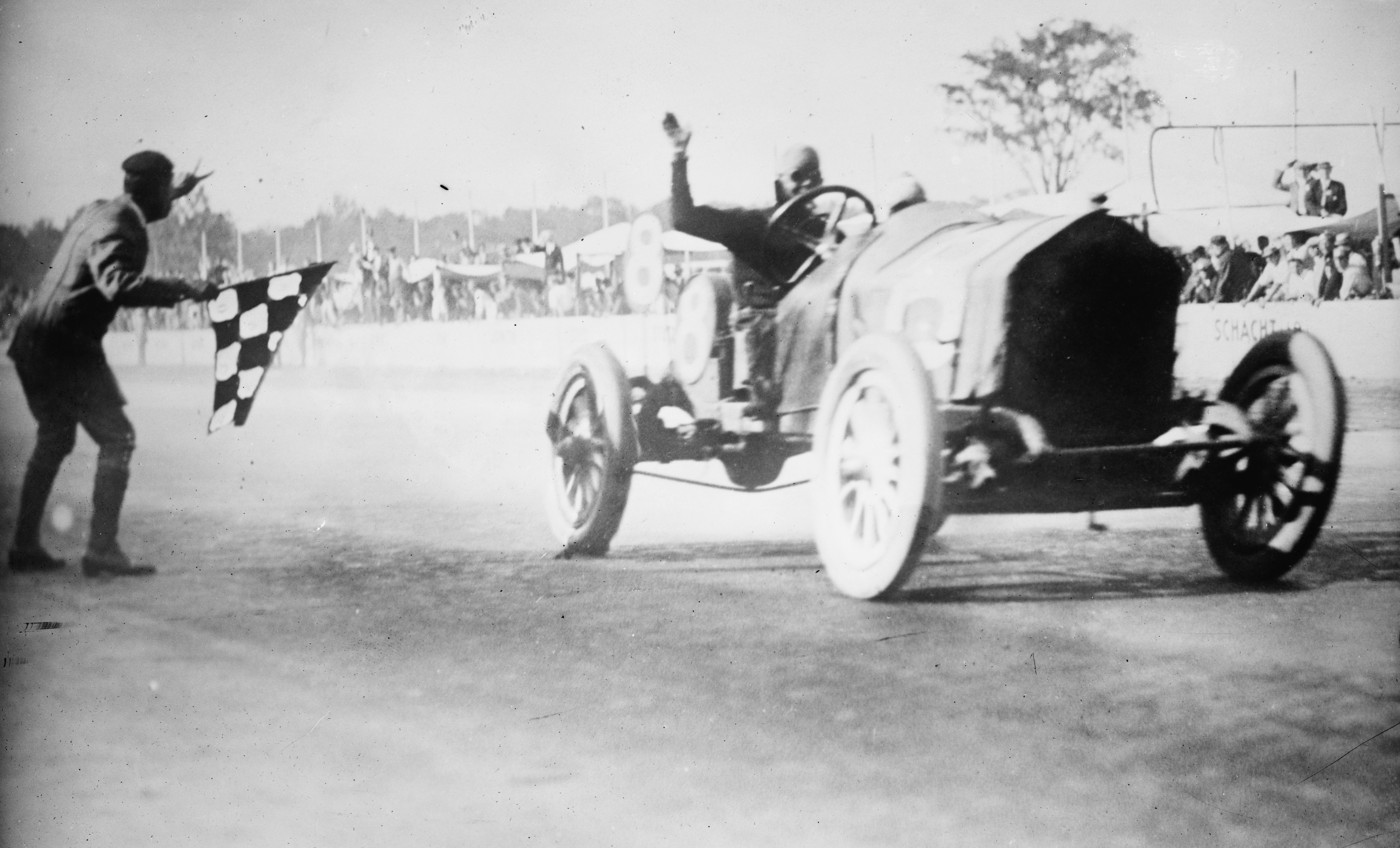
Joe Dawson winning the 1912 Indianapolis 500

The Indianapolis Motor Speedway complex was built in 1909 as a gravel-and-tar track and hosted a smattering of small events, including ones for motorcycles. The first long-distance event, in "fearful conditions", was the 100-lap Prest-O-Lite Trophy in 1909, won by Bob Burman in a Buick. The breakup of the track surface led to two fatal accidents in the first two long-distance events (a 250 mi (400 km) and 300 mi (480 km), which was shortened to 235 mi (378 km) after two severe wrecks).

The fact that these spectacles had attracted 15,000 paying customers (and crowds of up to 40,000) persuaded principal owner Carl G. Fisher to spend $155,000 on repaving the track with 3.2 million bricks; he also added a 33-inch (0.84 m) tall concrete wall around the track's circumference. During the 1910 Decoration Day weekend, the first events on the newly paved circuit drew 60,000 spectators; Ray Harroun won the 200-mile (320 km) Wheeler-Schebler Trophy in a Marmon.

The crowds grew progressively smaller for the rest of the season, however, so the track owners chose to focus on a single race, and considered a 24-hour contest, in the fashion of Le Mans, or a one-thousand-mile (1,600 km) event. They decided on 500 miles (800 km), the estimated distance a race car could run before dark descended on the track, and a spectacular purse of $25,000, equivalent to 82.93 pounds (37.62 kg) of pure gold. The combination allowed the track to rapidly acquire a privileged status for automobile races.

The first "500" was held at the Speedway in 1911 on Decoration Day, May 30, (as it was known from its inception in 1868 to 1967, when federal law made "Memorial Day" the official name), run to a 600-cubic-inch (9,800 cc) maximum engine size formula. It saw a field of 40 starters, with Harroun piloting a Marmon Model 32-based Wasp racer—outfitted with his invention, the rear-view mirror. Harroun (with relief from Cyrus Patschke) was declared the winner, although Ralph Mulford protested the official result. Eighty thousand spectators were in attendance, and an annual tradition had been established. Many considered Harroun to be a hazard during the race, as he was the only driver in the race driving without a riding mechanic, who checked the oil pressure and let the driver know when traffic was coming.

In 1912, the purse was raised to $50,000, the field was limited to 33 (where it remains), and a riding mechanic was made mandatory. This second event was won by Joe Dawson in a National, after Ralph DePalma's Mercedes broke. Although the first race was won by an American driver at the wheel of an American car, European makers such as the Italian Fiat or French Peugeot companies soon developed their vehicles to try to win the event, which they did from 1912 to 1919. The 1913 event saw a change to a 450-cubic-inch (7,400 cc) maximum engine size.

After World War I, the native drivers and manufacturers regained their dominance of the race, and engineer Harry Miller set himself up as the most competitive of the post-war builders.

For musical entertainment before the start of the race, the Purdue All-American Marching Band has been the host band of the race since 1919. In 1946, American operatic tenor and car enthusiast James Melton started the tradition of singing "Back Home Again in Indiana" with the Purdue Band before the race when asked to do so on the spur of the moment by Speedway president Tony Hulman. This tradition has continued through the years, notably by actor and singer Jim Nabors from 1972 until 2014. Nabors announced in 2014, citing health-related reasons, that the 2014 Indy 500 would be the last at which he would sing the song. In 2015, the a cappella group Straight No Chaser sang the song before the race, and in the two races held after Nabors' retirement (and before he became the regular singer), the singing of the song was done on a rotating basis, with the Spring 2014 winner of The Voice Josh Kaufman performing in 2016. However, the Speedway has returned to a standard singer with Jim Cornelison doing it since 2017.

=== Miller and Offenhauser ===
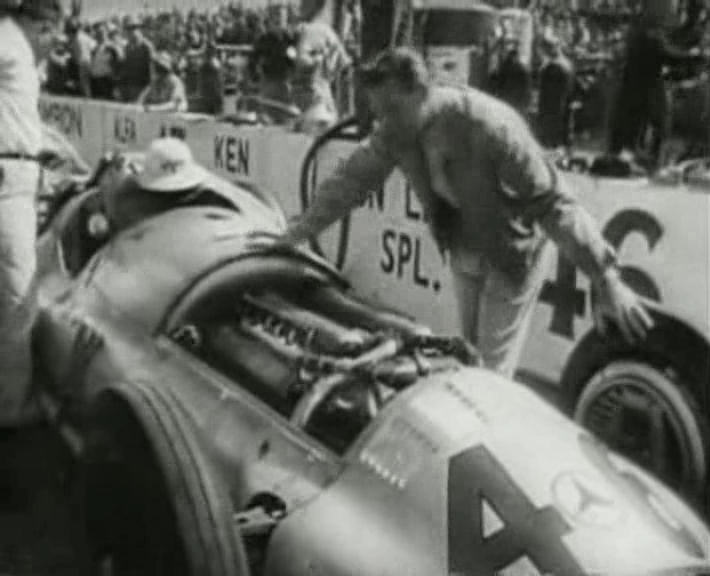
The Mercedes-Benz W154 entered by Don Lee at the 1947 Indianapolis 500 with Duke Nalon as driver

Following the European trends, engine sizes were limited to 183 cu in (3,000 cc) during 1920–1922, 122 cu in (2,000 cc) for 1923–1925, and 91 cu in (1,490 cc) in 1926–1929. The 1920 race was won by Gaston Chevrolet in a Frontenac, prepared by his brothers, powered by the first eight-cylinder engine to win the 500. For 1923, riding mechanics were no longer required. A supercharged car, ID, first won the race in 1924. In 1925, Pete DePaolo was the first to win at an average over 100 mph (160 km/h), with a speed of 101.13 mph (162.75 km/h).

In the early 1920s, Miller built his 3.0-liter (183 in^{3}) engine, inspired by the Peugeot Grand Prix engine which had been serviced in his shop by Fred Offenhauser in 1914, installing it in Jimmy Murphy's Duesenberg and allowing him to win the 1922 edition of the race. Miller then created his own automobiles, which shared the 'Miller' designation, which, in turn, were powered by supercharged versions of his 2.0- and 1.5-liter (122 and 91 in^{3}) engine single-seaters, winning four more races for the engine up to 1929 (two of them, 1926 and 1928, in Miller chassis). The engines powered another seven winners until 1938 (two of them, 1930 and 1932, in Miller chassis), then ran at first with stock-type motors before later being adjusted to the international 3.0-liter formula.

After purchasing the Speedway in 1927, Eddie Rickenbacker prohibited supercharging and increased the displacement limit to 366 cu in (6,000 cc), while also re-introducing the riding mechanic.

In 1935, Miller's former employees, Fred Offenhauser and Leo Goossen, had already achieved their first win with the soon-to-become famous 4-cylinder Offenhauser or "Offy" engine. This motor was forever connected with the Brickyard's history with a to-date record total of 27 wins, in both naturally aspirated and supercharged form, and winning a likewise record-holding 18 consecutive years between 1947 and 1964.

=== European incursions and links to Formula One ===
Meanwhile, European manufacturers, gone from the Indianapolis 500 for nearly two decades, made a brief return just before World War II, with the competitive Maserati 8CTF allowing Wilbur Shaw to become the first driver to win consecutively at Indianapolis, in 1939 and 1940. As of 2025, these remain the only Indy 500 victories obtained by fully Italian cars. With the 500 having been a part of the World Drivers' Championship between 1950 and 1960, Ferrari made a discreet appearance at the 1952 event with Alberto Ascari, but European entries were few and far between during those days. Among the Formula One drivers who did drive at the speedway was one-time world champion Italian Giuseppe Farina, who failed to qualify for the 1956 and 1957 races, and five-time world champion Argentinian Juan Manuel Fangio, who failed to qualify for the 1958 race.

It was not until the Indianapolis 500 was removed from the World Championship calendar that European entries made their return. In 1963, technical innovator Colin Chapman brought his Team Lotus to Indianapolis for the first time, attracted by the large monetary prizes, far bigger than the usual at a European event. Racing a mid-engined car, Scotsman Jim Clark was second in his first attempt in 1963, dominated in 1964 until suffering suspension failure on lap 47, and completely dominated the race in 1965, a victory which also interrupted the success of the Offy, and giving the 4.2-liter Ford V8 its first success at the race. The following year, 1966, saw another British win, this time Graham Hill in a Lola-Ford.

The Offenhauser engine was also paired with a European maker, McLaren, obtaining three wins for the chassis, one with the Penske team in 1972 with driver Mark Donohue, and two for the McLaren works team in 1974 and 1976 with Johnny Rutherford. This was also the last time the Offy would win a race, its competitiveness steadily decreasing until its final appearance in 1983. American drivers continued to fill the majority of entries at the Brickyard in the following years, but European technology had taken over. Starting in 1978, most chassis and engines were European, with the only American-based chassis to win during the CART era being the Wildcat and Galmer (which was technically built in Bicester, England) in 1982 and 1992, respectively. Ford and Chevrolet engines were built in the UK by Cosworth and Ilmor, respectively.

As of 2026, the most recent active Formula One driver to have entered the 500 is Fernando Alonso, who drove in the 2017 and 2020 races. Alonso was the first Formula One driver to enter the 500 while competing in F1 since Teo Fabi in 1984.

=== World Series ===
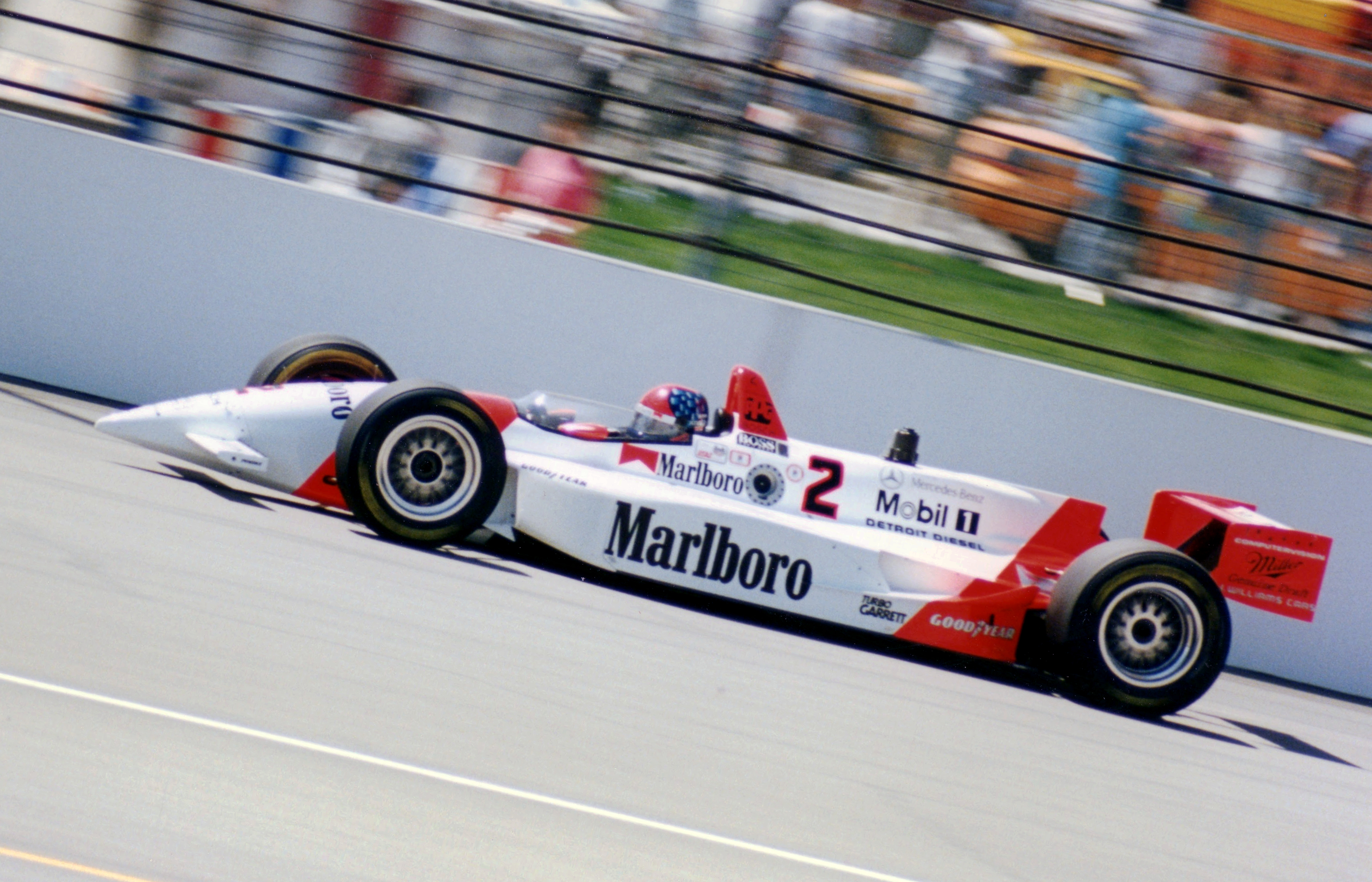
Emerson Fittipaldi driving the Penske PC-23 at the 1994 event

After foreign cars became the norm, foreign drivers began competing in the Indianapolis 500 regularly, choosing the United States as their primary base for their motor racing activities. Brazilian Emerson Fittipaldi, Italian Teo Fabi, and Colombian Roberto Guerrero were able to obtain good outings in the 1980s, as was Dutchman Arie Luyendyk. In 1993, reigning Formula One World Champion Nigel Mansell shocked the racing world by leaving Formula One for CART. While he came in only third in the 500, he won the 1993 CART championship. Foreign-born drivers became a regular fixture of Indianapolis in the years to follow. Despite the increase in foreign drivers commonly being associated with the CART era, three of the first six Indianapolis 500 winners were non-American drivers.

=== Split Era ===
For the 1996 racing season, Speedway owner Tony George formed his own racing series, the Indy Racing League (IRL), making the 500 its marquee event. The most popular drivers and teams in open-wheel racing remained with CART, setting the split in motion. (See more under Race Sanctioning.)

The two series unified in 2008 ending the split. The damage to open-wheel racing caused by the split has been termed by many sports writers as "immeasurable." During this time, the Indianapolis 500 lost fans failing to sell out again until the 2016 running. NASCAR's Daytona 500 overtook the Indianapolis 500 as the most watched auto race on television until 2011. NASCAR's Brickyard 400 in the opinions of some fans and media writers overtook the Indianapolis 500 until a 2008 tire disaster in the 400.

In 2005, Danica Patrick and "Danica-mania" brought more attention back to the 500. While Patrick was not the first woman to race at Indy, she was the most popular and became the first to lead laps.

=== Centennial Era ===
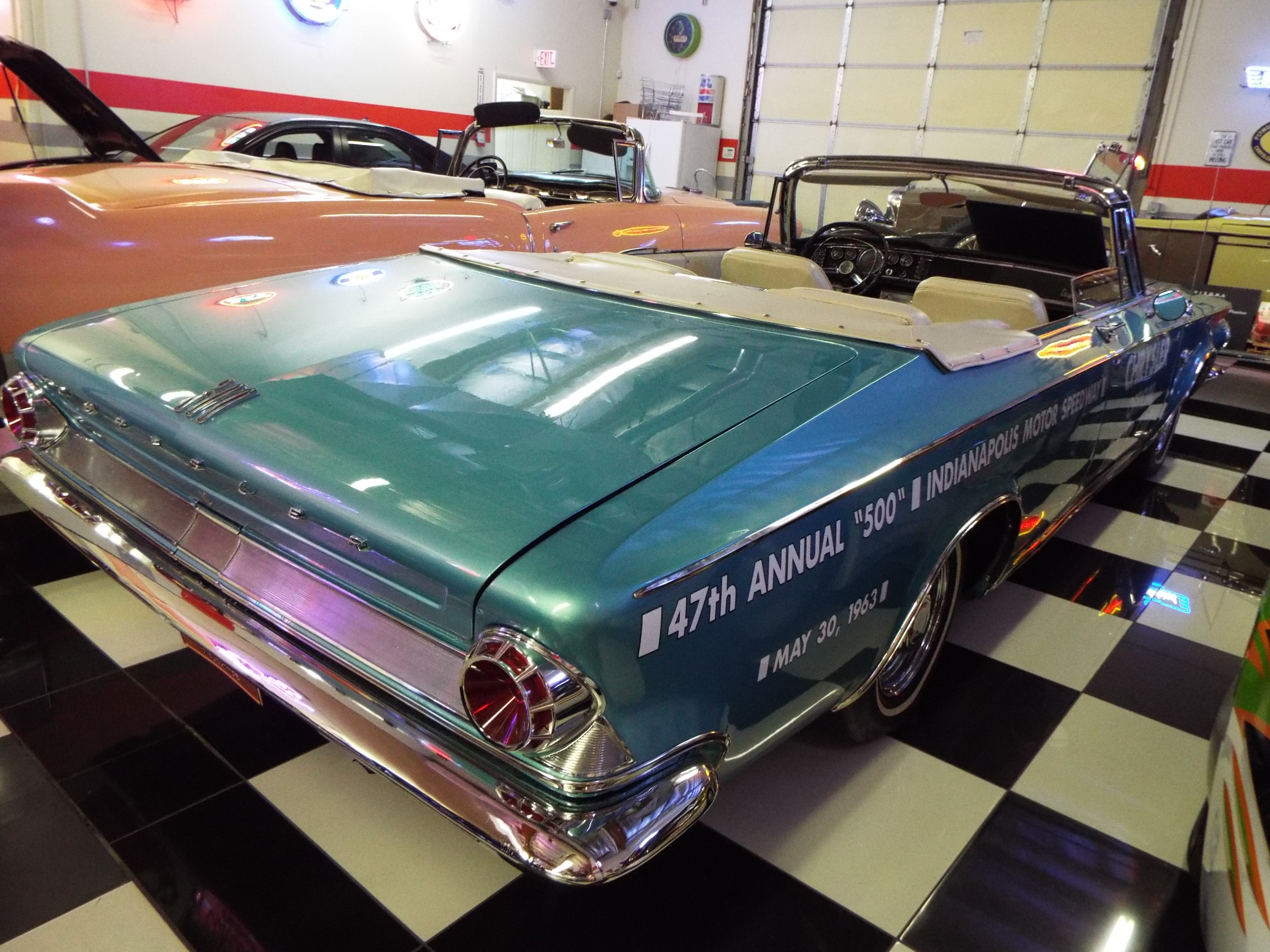
The Chrysler 300 pace setter used in 1963 in the 47th running of the Indianapolis 500

In 2009, the Indianapolis Motor Speedway began a three-year-long "Centennial Era" to celebrate the 100th anniversary of the opening of the track (1909), and the 100th anniversary of the first Indy 500 (1911). As a gesture to the nostalgic Centennial Era celebration (2009–2011), tickets for the 2009 race donned the moniker "93rd 500 Mile International Sweepstakes". It is the first time since 1980 that the "Sweepstakes" title has been used. In May 2009, the ordinal (93rd) was used very sparingly, and for the first time since 1981, was not identified on the annual logo. Instead, in most instances in print, television, and radio, the race was referred to as the "2009 Indianapolis 500". Since the race was not held during the United States' participation in the two World Wars (1917–1918, 1942–1945), the advertised Centennial Era occurred during the 93rd to 95th runnings. To avoid confusion between the 100th anniversary, and the actual number of times the race has been run, references to the ordinal during the Centennial Era were curtailed.

In the 2014 meeting, the road course became part of the race meeting for the first time. The GMR Grand Prix road course event, and the three upper tiers of Road to Indy, participated in road course events at the Speedway during the first week of activities.

Six years later, in 2016, the race celebrated its 100th running with about 350,000 in attendance and an announced sellout.

Four local actors were hired to portray the Founding Four of James Allison, Carl Fisher, Frank Wheeler, and Arthur Newby during multiple Centennial Era events and the 100th race. Harold Hefner (Allison), Tom Harrison (Fisher), Jeff Angel (Wheeler), and Matthew Allen (Newby).

In 2020, the race was delayed for the first time from its usual Memorial Day running to August due to the COVID-19 pandemic. There was no audience in attendance, so as to comply with pandemic guidelines. The road course race was moved to the NASCAR weekend in July, and the support races on the road course moved to its own September weekend. As races were cancelled because of local restrictions, the Speedway added two more road course races in October as part of the Intercontinental GT Challenge meeting, where attendance was capped to 10,000 per event.

In 2024, the race was delayed for over four hours due to heavy rain and thunderstorms in the area.

=== Race name ===
The race was originally advertised as the "International 500-Mile Sweepstakes Race" from 1911 to 1916. However, from its inception, the race has been widely known as the Indianapolis 500 or, more simply "the 500", as for many years, it was the only noteworthy auto race of such distance. In 1919, the race was referred to as the "Liberty Sweepstakes" following WWI. From 1920 to 1980, the race officially reverted to the "International Sweepstakes" moniker, as printed on the tickets and other paraphernalia, with slight variations over the years.

Following WWII, the race was commonly recognized as "The 500", "The 500-Mile Race", "Indianapolis 500-Mile Race", "Indianapolis 500", or the simple form "Indy 500". Usually the ordinal (e.g. "50th") preceded it. Often the race was also advertised on the radio as the "Annual Memorial Day race", or similar variations. By the late 20th century, the term "Indy 500" had slowly emerged as the most common and most popularly used moniker. As such, since 2016, the official race logo has used the contemporary and colloquial term "Indy 500".

For the 1981 race, the name "65th Indianapolis 500-Mile Race" was officially adopted, with all references as the "International Sweepstakes" dropped. Since 1981, the race has been formally advertised in this fashion, complete with a unique annual logo with the ordinal almost always included. Around that same time, in the wake of the 1979 entry controversy, and the formation of CART, the race changed to an invitational event, rather than an Open, rendering the "sweepstakes" description inappropriate.

For nearly a century, the race eschewed any sort of naming rights or title sponsor, a move, though uncommon in the modern sports world, that was well received by fans. This tradition finally ended in 2016 when a presenting sponsor, PennGrade, was added for the first time. The insurance company Gainbridge paid to be the title sponsor in 2019.

The Borg-Warner Trophy, introduced in 1936, called the event the "Indianapolis 500-Mile Race".

=== Winners ===
See: List of Indianapolis 500 winners

== Race specifics ==
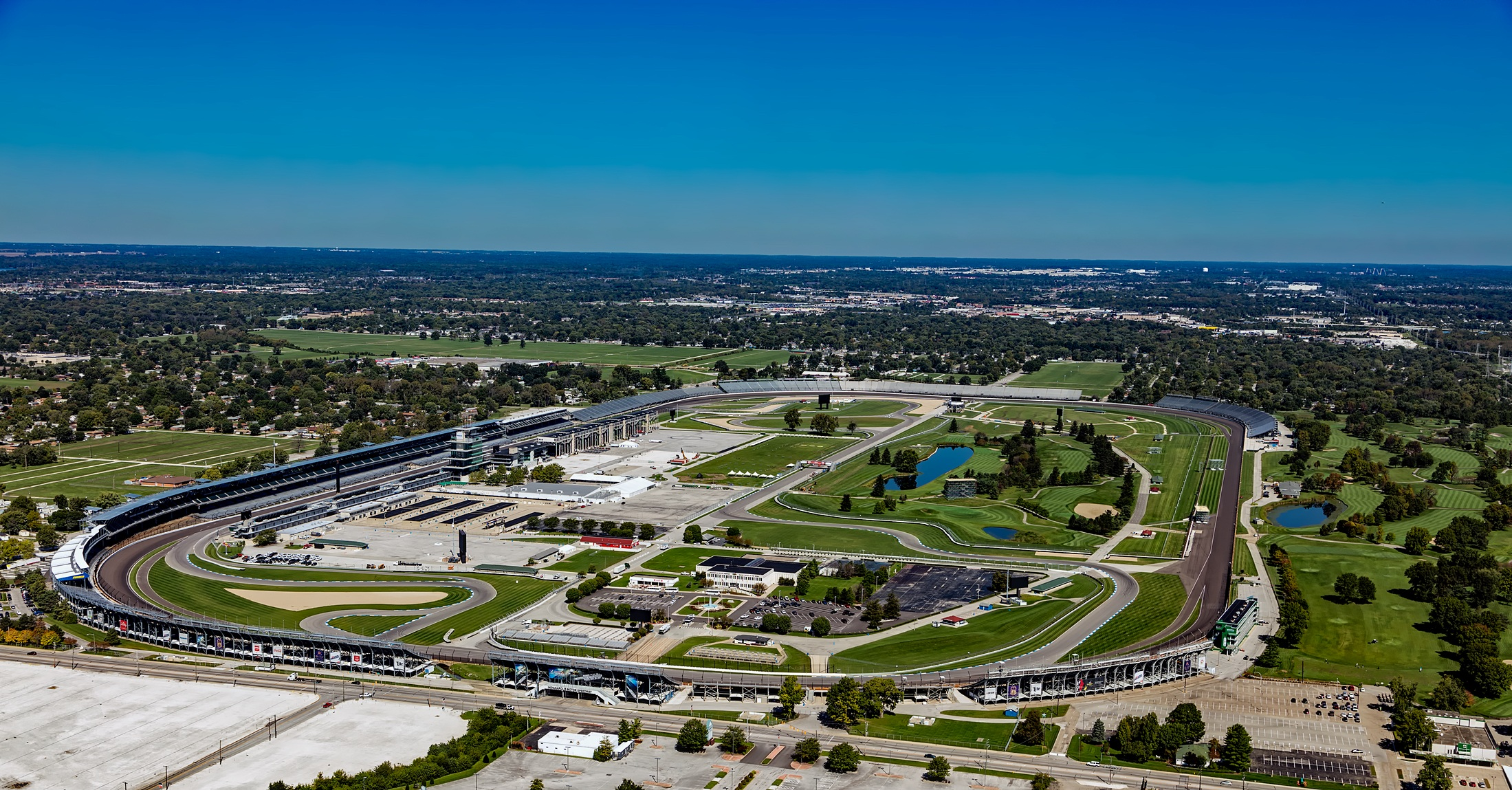
The Indianapolis Motor Speedway

The Indianapolis 500 is held annually at the Indianapolis Motor Speedway, a 2.5-mile (4 km) oval circuit. The track is a rounded rectangle, with four distinct turns of identical dimensions, connected by four straightaways (two long straightaways and two "short chutes"). Traditionally, the field consists of 33 starters, aligned in a starting grid of eleven rows of three cars apiece. Drivers race 200 laps, counter-clockwise around the circuit, for a distance of 500 miles (800 km). Since its inception in 1911, the race has always been scheduled on or around Memorial Day. Since 1974, the race has been specifically scheduled for the Sunday of Memorial Day weekend. The Sunday of Memorial Day weekend is widely considered one of the most important days on the motorsports calendar, as it is the day of the Indianapolis 500, the Coca-Cola 600 – and in numerous cases, the Monaco Grand Prix. Practice and time trials are held in the two weeks leading up to the race, while miscellaneous preliminary testing and rookie orientation is held as early as April.

The race is the most prestigious event of the IndyCar calendar, and one of the oldest and most important automobile races. It has been reported to be the largest single-day sporting event in the world. Likewise, the Indianapolis Motor Speedway itself is regarded as the world's largest sporting facility in terms of capacity. The total purse exceeded $30 million in 2026, with over $4.3 million awarded to the winner, making it one of the richest cash prize funds in sports.

Similar to other motorsports series, the Indianapolis 500 is typically held early in the IndyCar Series season. That is unique to most other sports where major events are usually at the end of the respective season. Currently, the Indy 500 is the sixth event of the 17-race IndyCar schedule. From the 1970s to the 1990s, Indianapolis was often the second or third race of the season, and as late as the 1950s, it was sometimes the first championship event of the year. Due to the high prestige of the Indianapolis 500—rivaling or even surpassing the season championship—it is not uncommon for some teams and drivers to focus heavily on preparing for that race during the early part of the season, and not focus fully on the championship battle until after Indy.

=== Rain delays ===
Due to safety issues including aquaplaning, the race is not held in wet conditions. In the event of a rain delay, the race will be postponed until rain showers cease and the track is sufficiently dried. Advanced track-drying apparatuses including jet dryers, blowers, and vacuums are employed to expedite the drying process. If rain falls during the race itself, officials will halt the race (red flag) and await safe conditions. In cases of very light precipitation, officials may elect to simply put out the caution flag and have the field circulate under yellow until it is safe to go back to green.

The officials can end the race and declare the results official if more than half of the scheduled distance (i.e., 101 laps) has been completed. As such, the 101st lap may be completed under caution (yellow flag). If less than half the distance has been completed, the race must be resumed and achieve at least the 101-lap mark in order to be official. A primary limiting factor is available daylight, as the track does not have artificial lighting. If the race is halted and cannot be resumed before sunset, the race will be declared over official if 101 or more laps have been completed. If fewer than 101 laps were completed, resumption will be scheduled for the next possible day.

=== Late-race red flags ===
The Indianapolis 500, as well as other IndyCar Series races, does not utilize the green–white–checker finish in case of a late-race yellow. The race can be (and has at times) finished under caution. However, officials may call for a late-race red flag (in lieu of a lengthy yellow) to provide an opportunity for a green-flag finish. this option was used in 2014, 2019, 2022, 2023, and 2026.

=== Car ===
The event is contested by "Indy cars", a formula of professional-level, single-seat, open cockpit, open-wheel, purpose-built race cars. As of 2020, all entrants utilize 2.2L V6, twin-turbocharged engines, tuned to produce a range of 550–750 horsepower (410–560 kW). Much of the car is spec for all entries with limited opportunities for development. The most obvious difference between cars is with Chevrolet and Honda providing competing engines. Dallara is at present the sole chassis supplier to the series. Firestone, which has a deep history in the sport, dating back to the first 500, is currently the exclusive tire provider. A hybrid component was added to the cars beginning with the 2025 running.

=== Field ===
The traditional 33-car starting field at Indianapolis is larger than the fields at the other IndyCar races. The field at Indy typically consists of all of the full-time IndyCar Series entries (roughly 25-27 cars), along with roughly 8-10 part-time or "Indy-only" entries. The "Indy-only" entries, also known as "One-offs", may be an extra car added to an existing full-time team, or a part-time team altogether that does not enter any of the other races, or enters only a few selected races. The "Indy-only" drivers may come from a wide range of pedigrees but are usually experienced Indy car competitors who either lack a full-time ride, are former full-time drivers who have elected to drop down to part-time status, or occasional one-off drivers from other racing disciplines. It is not uncommon for some drivers (particularly former Indy 500 winners) to quit full-time driving during the season, but race solely at Indy for numerous years afterward before entering full retirement.

=== Organization and management ===
The track and sanctioning series is currently owned by Penske Entertainment, a company owned by long time racing team owner Roger Penske. In addition to the permanent Speedway staff, roughly 12,500 personnel are mobilized during the Indianapolis 500 weekend to support broadcast operations, safety and medical services, crowd management, retail, weather monitoring, and other logistical functions.

Following the Indianapolis 500, a designated 500-hour renewal period is held during which ticket holders can renew or upgrade their seats for the following year; roughly 60–65 % of grandstand seats are typically committed during this period.

=== Technical regulations ===
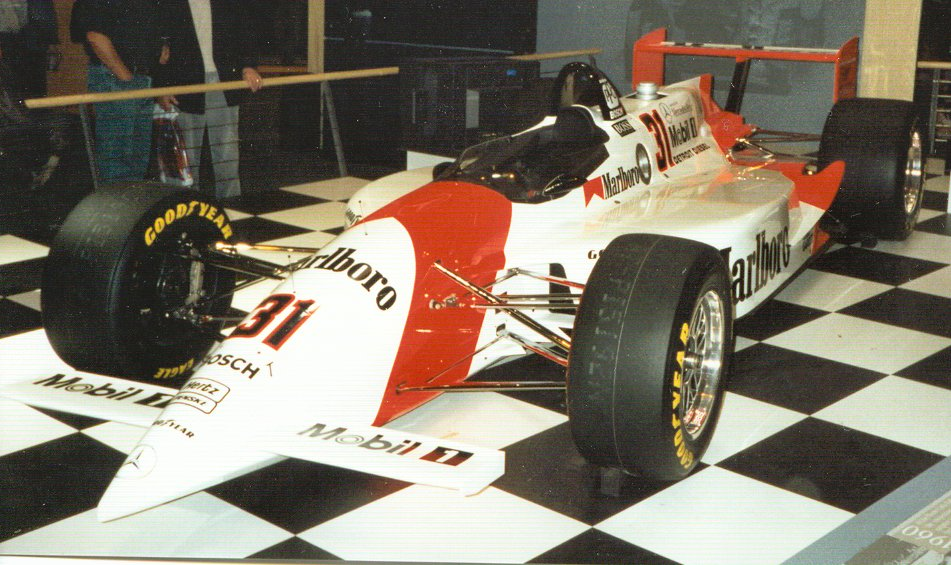
Penske PC-23 Mercedes, 1994 winning car

Technical specifications for the Indianapolis 500 are currently written by IndyCar. Rules are generally the same as every other IndyCar race. In the past, particularly during the era in which USAC sanctioned the Indy 500 (but CART sanctioned the other Indy car races), rules at Indy slightly differed at times. The result, for example, would be a particular chassis or engine configuration being legal at Indy, but not so at the CART-sanctioned events. This was rather commonplace in the 1980s and early 1990s, when "stock-block" engines (namely the V-6 Buick) were allotted an increased level of turbocharger boost by USAC at Indy, compared to the purpose-built V-8 quad-cam engines. While the "stock block" engines were technically legal in CART competition, they were not given the increased boost advantage, which effectively rendered them uncompetitive, and precluded their use by teams. The most famous manifestation of the USAC rules disparity was the Ilmor-built Mercedes-Benz 500I engine fielded by Roger Penske in 1994.

In the past, teams would enter up to two machines under a given car number—the "primary" car and a "backup" car. The backup car is identified by the letter "T". For example, the two cars for the #2 team would be numbered #2 and #2T. Both cars may be practiced during the month, but due to engine lease rules, they must share the same engine. It is not uncommon for teams to prefer their backup car, if it is deemed faster, or for other strategic reasons. Additionally, as the month wears on, a "T car" may be split off into a separate entry, and reassigned a new number, or be sold to another team. At present, teams may have backup cars but are not allowed to have engines installed in them and can only run them by withdrawing their primary car which typically only happens if the primary car is destroyed in a practice or qualifying crash.

All cars must pass a rigorous technical inspection before receiving a sticker signifying that the car is eligible to practice. Various criteria include minimum weight, dimensions, and approved parts, particularly safety equipment. Before and after qualification attempts, cars must pass another inspection. The pre-qualifying inspection is focused on safety aspects and is done on the pit lane qualifying queue. It is relatively brief, due to the time constraints of the qualifying procedure. The post-qualifying inspection is much more stringent and lengthy, taking place in the garage area. It is to detect deviations from the performance guidelines set forth by the league, and cars can and have been fined or outright disqualified if they fail inspection.

During the race, work on the car is permitted, but it is usually limited to routine pit stop work (changing tires and refueling) and minor adjustments (wing angles, etc.) Pit stop activity is rigorously rehearsed by the crews and in modern times, routine pit stops are regularly completed in under ten seconds. Other more involved work, such as replacing damaged bodywork (wings, nose cones, etc.), can also be completed quickly by the crews. More lengthy repairs are allowed, and since 1998 teams are permitted to return to the garage area to make heavy repairs. However, there are limitations to the extent of repair work allowed and the practicality of such work. Teams are not allowed to change engines, and since 1933 a rule has been in place where teams are not allowed to add oil once the race has begun.

=== Qualifying procedure ===
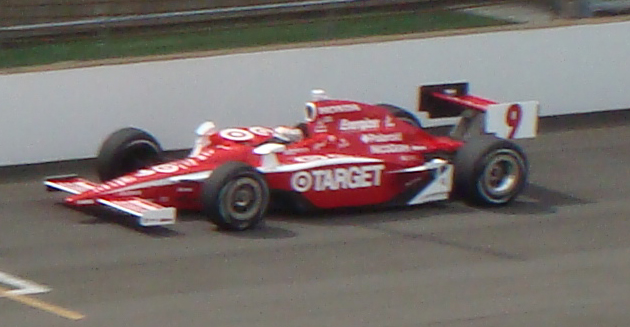
Scott Dixon making his pole-winning qualification run for the 2008 Indianapolis 500

Throughout the years, the race has used several different qualifying procedures. The current four-lap (ten-mile) qualifying distance was first introduced in 1920 and has been used every year since 1939.

Presently, qualifying occurs on over two days. On Day 1, positions 13–30 (or 13–33 if there are only 33 entries) have their position set with all other positions set on Day 2. Following Fast Friday practice, all cars are entered into a blind draw for the qualifying order.

- Saturday: All entries are guaranteed at least one attempt to qualify and can make additional attempts if time permits. At the end of the session, the fastest twelve drivers advance to a "shootout" session held on the next day to determine pole position and the first four rows of the grid. As mentioned above, drivers who qualify 10th–30th have their spots locked in and will not re-qualify. Drivers who qualify 31st and lower advance to a separate "shootout" session also held on the next day to determine the final three spots on the grid. For re-attempts, there are two lanes: Lane 2 is known as the "no risk lane" and drivers can keep their previous time if their second (or subsequent) run is slower. Lane 1 is known as the "priority lane", and no cars from lane 2 are allowed on track unless lane 1 is empty. However, to re-qualify in lane 1 you must withdraw any previous times, regardless if the attempt is slower than a previous one.
- Sunday: First, teams that finished Saturday 1st-12th will qualify in reverse order of how they finished on Saturday. Each car gets exactly one attempt. The top six advance to the final round. While the top six prepare their cars, cars that finished 31st or worst on Saturday will re-qualify in a 75-minute last chance qualifying session. Each car gets once guaranteed attempt. After each car has their guaranteed attempt, teams may re-attempt until time is up, but must withdraw their time to do so. At the end of the session, the fastest three cars make the race, starting on the last row, and all others fail to qualify. Finally, in a session officially known as the Firestone Fast Six, the fastest six cars from the earlier session each make exactly one attempt each with the fastest attempt winning the pole.

Each attempt is a single car run. Cars are allowed two warm-up laps. At that time, a member of the team is stationed at the north end of the main stretch. They must wave a green flag, signaling an attempt, or else the car will be waved off. The attempt can be waved off during any of the four laps by the team, driver, or race officials. (The series will wave off the run if it is obvious the run will not be fast enough to qualify and it is getting late in the day.) If an attempt is waved off after the run starts, the attempt counts and the previous time is still forfeited unless race officials waved off the attempt because of weather. At the end of the day Saturday and at the end of the last row qualifying on Sunday, a ceremonial gun is shot off when time is up, attempts in progress (defined as the car must be on track) can be completed but no further attempts are allowed. Weather can and often does affect qualifying and can result in last-minute format changes.

== Race sanctioning ==
=== AAA and USAC ===
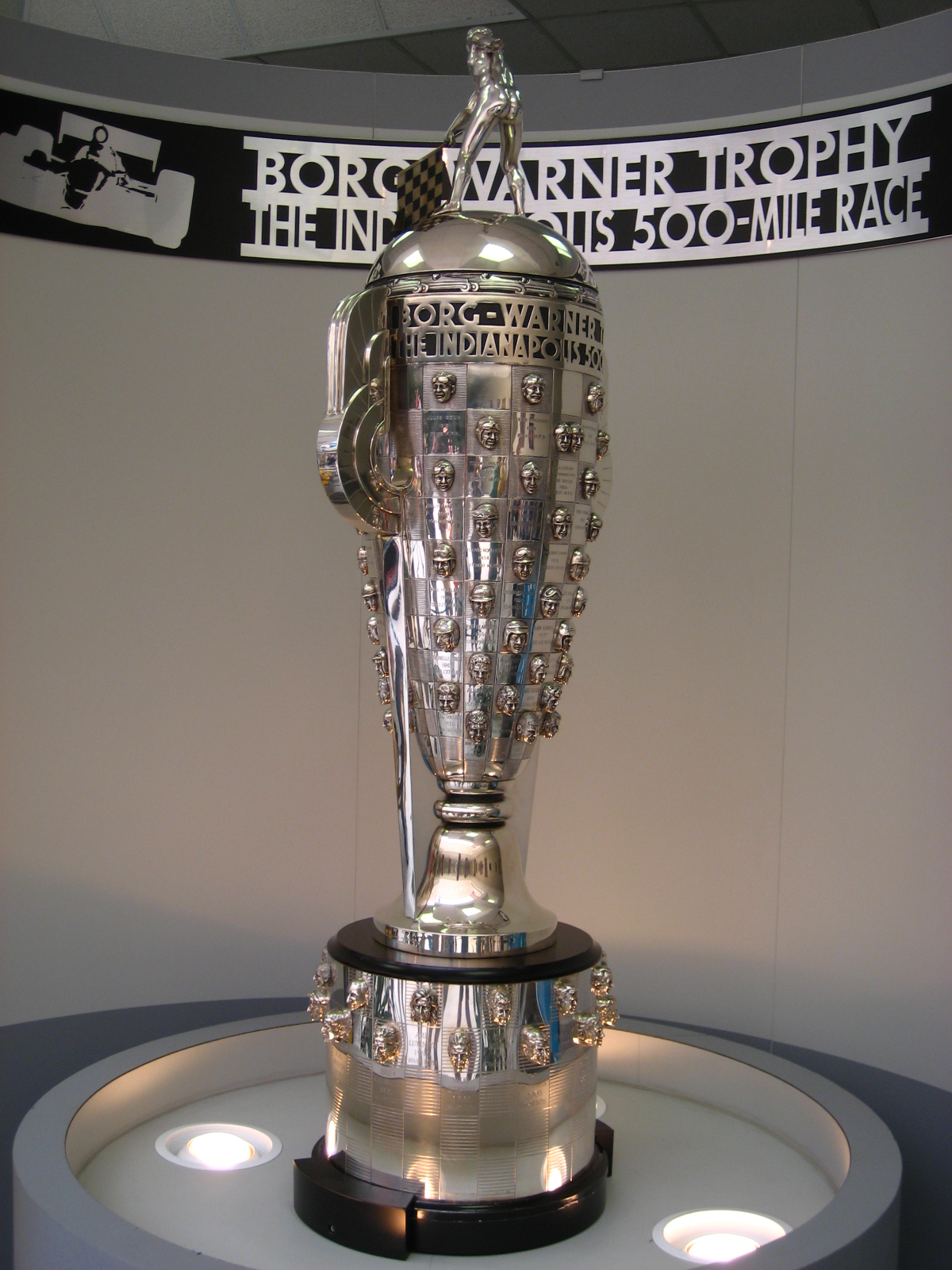
The Borg-Warner Trophy presented to Indy 500 winners in victory lane, otherwise on permanent display at the Hall of Fame Museum

From 1911 to 1955, the race was organized under the auspices of the AAA Contest Board. Following the 1955 Le Mans disaster, AAA dissolved the Contest Board to concentrate on its membership program aimed at the general motoring public. Speedway owner Tony Hulman founded USAC in 1956, which took over sanctioning of the race and the sport of Championship racing.

From 1950 to 1960, the Indianapolis 500 also counted toward the FIA's World Championship of Drivers (now synonymous with Formula One), although few drivers participated in the other races of that series. Italian driver Alberto Ascari was the only European-based driver to race in the 500 during its World Championship years. His appearance in 1952 in a Ferrari was also the only time a Ferrari has ever appeared in the race. Juan Manuel Fangio practiced at the track in 1958 but declined an offer to race.

The Indianapolis 500 itself, however, remained under the sanctioning control of USAC. It became the lone top-level race the body still sanctioned, as it ultimately dropped all other Indy car races (as well as their stock car division) to concentrate on sprints and midgets. For the next three years, the race was not officially recognized on the CART calendar, but the CART teams and drivers comprised the field. By 1983, an agreement was made for the USAC-sanctioned Indy 500 to be recognized on the CART calendar and the race awarded points towards the CART championship.

Despite the CART/USAC divide, from 1983 to 1995 the race was run in relative harmony. CART and USAC occasionally quarreled over relatively minor technical regulations but utilized the same machines and the CART-based teams and driver comprised the bulk of the Indy 500 entries each year.

=== IndyCar Series ===
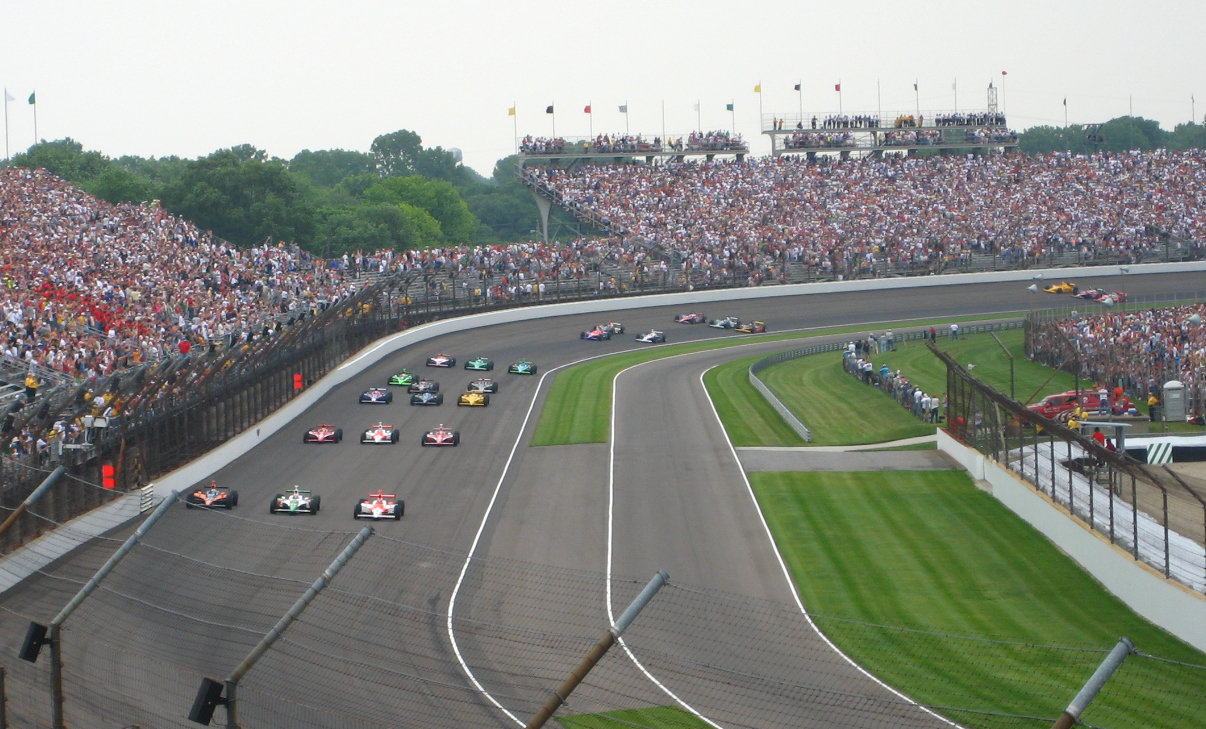
The starting field of the 2007 Indianapolis 500 in formation before the start

In 1994, Speedway owner Tony George announced plans for a new series, to be called the Indy Racing League, with Indy 500 as its centerpiece. George announced that he intended to reverse the tide of dramatic cost increases, the decreasing number of ovals in the CART series, and to allow for more opportunity for drivers from USAC sprint-car ranks. Detractors accused George of using the 500 as leverage to allow the Speedway to gain complete control of the sport of open-wheel racing in the United States.

In response to CART's 1996 schedule that put several races in direct conflict with the first Indy Racing League events, George announced that 25 of the 33 starting positions at the 1996 Indy 500 would be reserved for the top 25 cars in IRL points standings. This effectively left eight starting positions open to the CART-regulars that chose not to participate in the IRL races and would be the first time that not all 33 spots were open for qualification in the history of the race. CART refused to compromise on the schedule conflicts, skipped the IRL races required to accumulate the qualifying points, boycotted the race, and staged a competing event, the U.S. 500, on the same day at Michigan. Veteran Buddy Lazier won a competitive but crash-filled 1996 Indy 500. Two CART teams, Walker Racing and Galles Racing, competed in the Indianapolis 500 to fulfill sponsor obligations and were welcomed without incident. The U.S. 500, meanwhile was marred by a crash on the pace laps that forced ten teams to use backup cars.

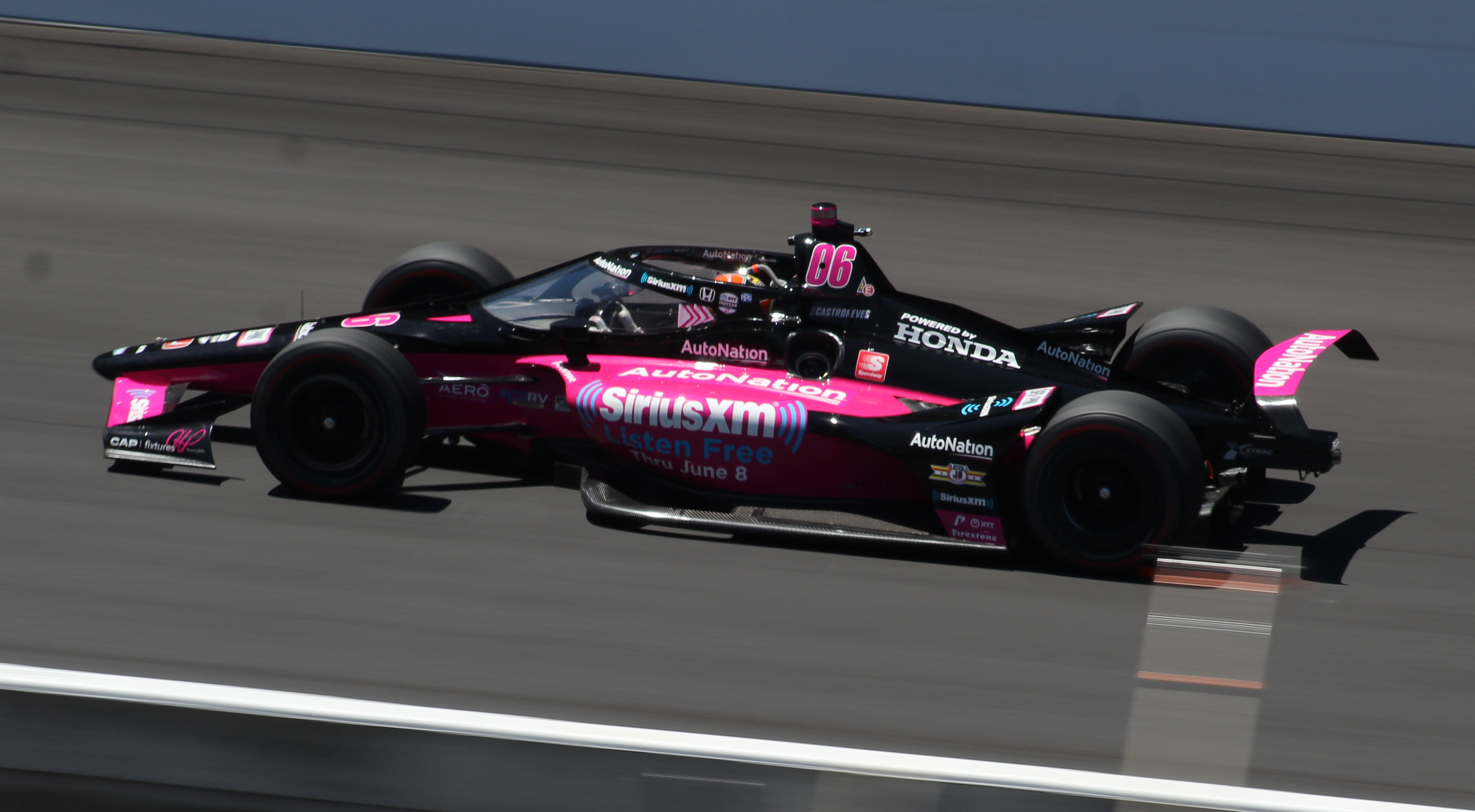
Hélio Castroneves, winner in 2001, 2002, 2009, and 2021

For 1997, new rules for less expensive cars and "production-based" engines were put into place. The move made it such that the IRL utilized different and incompatible equipment from CART; no CART-based teams would enter the Indy 500 for the next three years. CART would run a 300-mile race at Gateway International Raceway on the Saturday of Memorial Day weekend from 1997 to 1999 to avoid a conflict.

In 2000, Target Chip Ganassi Racing, still a CART-mainstay, decided to compete at Indianapolis with drivers Jimmy Vasser and Juan Pablo Montoya. On race day, Montoya dominated the event, leading 167 of the 200 laps to victory. In 2001, Penske Racing returned and won the race with driver Hélio Castroneves. Penske and Castroneves repeated with a win in 2002.

By 2003, Ganassi, Penske and Andretti Green defected to the IRL permanently. CART went bankrupt later in the year, and its rights and infrastructure were purchased by remaining car owners, and it became the Champ Car World Series. The two series continued to operate separately through 2007. In early 2008, the two series were unified to create a single open-wheel championship after a 12-year split being run under Indy Racing League/IMS control—known as the IndyCar Series.

== NASCAR and the 500 ==
In the 1960s and early 1970s, the Indy 500 and the World 600 (now known as the Coca-Cola 600) at Charlotte Motor Speedway were held on different days of the week. A handful of NASCAR regulars participated in both events in the same year, including Bobby Allison, Donnie Allison, Cale Yarborough, and Lee Roy Yarbrough. From 1974 to 1992, the two events were scheduled for the same day and same starting time, making participation in both impossible. A few stock car drivers during that time, namely Neil Bonnett in 1979, nevertheless still attempted to qualify at Indy, even if that meant skipping Charlotte altogether.

=== "Double Duty" ===
Since 1993, the Coca-Cola 600 has been scheduled in the evening the same day as the Indy 500. Hence, several NASCAR drivers have been able to compete in both the Indy 500 and the Coca-Cola 600 at Charlotte on the same day. The effort has been known as "Double Duty".

After the Indy 500, drivers would catch a helicopter directly from the Speedway to Indianapolis International Airport. From there they would fly to Concord Regional Airport, and ride a helicopter to the NASCAR race. John Andretti, Tony Stewart, Robby Gordon, Kyle Larson, and Katherine Legge attempted the feat, with Katherine Legge being the latest in 2026. In 2001, Tony Stewart became the first and to date only driver to complete the full race distance (1,100 miles) in both races on the same day.

For 2005, the start of Indianapolis was pushed back to 1 p.m. EDT to improve television ratings. This significantly closed the window for a driver to be able to race both events on the same day. (The race's original starting time had been set at 11 a.m. EST to 12 noon EDT—because in 1911, race promoters estimated it would take six hours to complete the event, and they did not want the race to finish too close to dinnertime. Nowadays, the race is routinely completed in under three-and-a-half hours.)

Two drivers, Mario Andretti and A. J. Foyt, have won the Indianapolis 500 and the Daytona 500. Foyt also won the 24 Hours of Daytona and 12 Hours of Sebring, America's premier endurance races, as well as the 24 Hours of Le Mans. Foyt won Le Mans in 1967, about one month after winning his third Indy 500. Andretti won the 1978 Formula One World Championship and is a three-time Sebring winner (he also won the 6-hour version of Daytona). Indianapolis 500 winner Johnny Rutherford once won one of the Daytona 500 qualifying races. In 2010, Chip Ganassi became the first car owner to win the Daytona and Indianapolis 500s in the same year, with Jamie McMurray winning the Daytona 500 and Dario Franchitti winning the Indianapolis 500.

In 2010, Bruton Smith (owner of Speedway Motorsports, Inc.), offered $20 million to any driver, IndyCar or NASCAR, who can win both the Indianapolis 500 and the Coca-Cola 600 on the same day starting in 2011, a feat that had never been accomplished. For 2011, the Indianapolis Motor Speedway moved the start time of the Indy 500 back to 12:15 PM EDT (prior to 2005, the engines started at 10:52 AM EST; under the modern schedule, engines start around 12:05 PM for a start around 12:15 PM), which re-opened the window for travel. Brad Keselowski suggested that he would consider answering the challenge in 2014. It was announced on March 4, 2014, that Kurt Busch would attempt to qualify for the 2014 Indianapolis 500, driving a fifth car for the Andretti Autosport team. Busch completed all 500 miles at Indy to finish sixth but dropped out of the 600 with a blown engine just past the 400-mile mark.

For 2019, NBC Sports and the Speedway changed the start time. The engines now start at 12:38 PM for a start time of 12:45 PM.

In 2024, Kyle Larson attempted, but could not complete, the double racing with Arrow McLaren in the 500 and intending to drive with Hendrick Motorsports in the 600. Kyle Larson finished 18th in the Indianapolis 500 and arrived part way through the Coke 600 due to a four-hour rain delay at Indianapolis Motor Speedway. The 600 was red flagged for a thunderstorm shortly after Larson arrived at the track and was not restarted, with Larson not being able to participate. Larson attempted again in 2025 but crashed out of both races, completing only 595 of the planned 1100 miles. For his 2025 attempt, the 600 was considered the priority and due to rain delays at Indianapolis, Larson would have had to leave the race with about 40 laps to go had he not already been out of the race. Larson won the 2025 NASCAR Cup Series championship, becoming the first driver to start that year's Indianapolis 500 and win the Cup Series title.

Given Larson's challenges in 2024 & 2025, it is currently considered "too difficult" by all reputable team owners and drivers to attempt unless one or both races or series make schedule changes to allow for more travel time.

However, in 2026, Katherine Legge will attempt to do the double, driving for HMD Motorsports with A.J. Foyt Racing in the Indianapolis 500 and Live Fast Motorsports in the Coke 600. She will be the first woman and first non-American driver to attempt the feat. She will be the oldest to do this, being 45 years of age.

== Culture ==
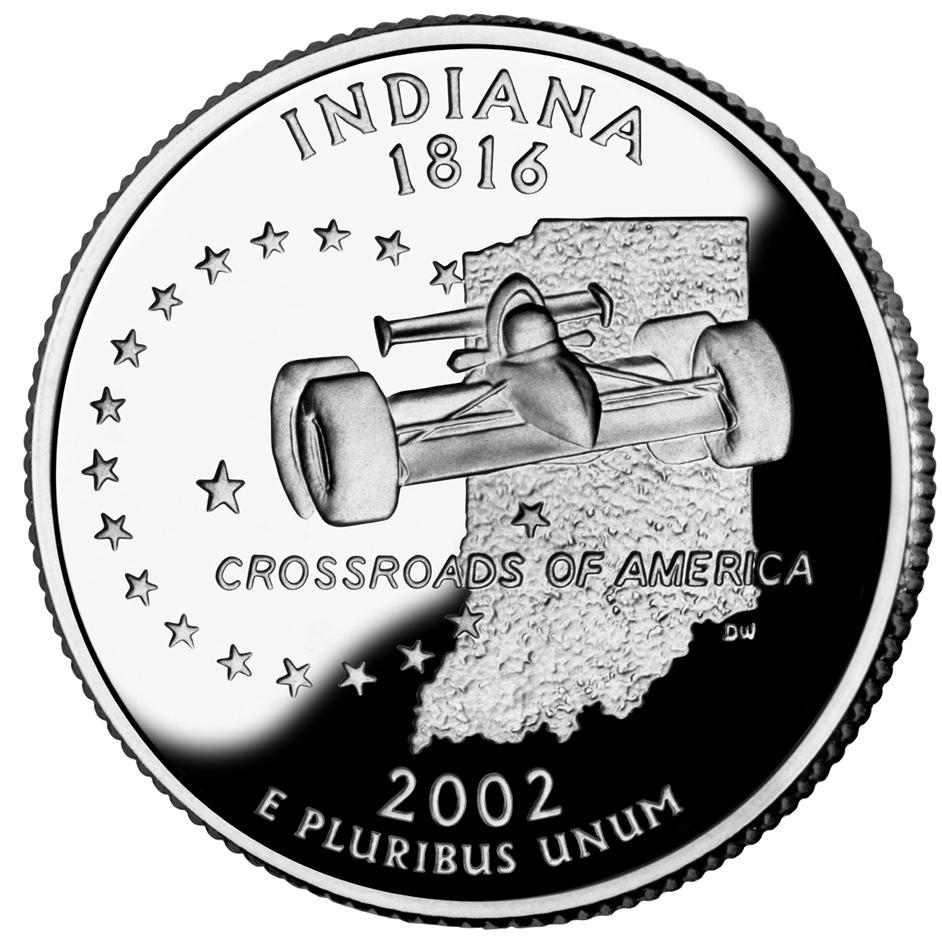
An IndyCar on the Indiana state quarter

=== Memorabilia ===
Many people promote and share information about the Indianapolis 500 and its memorabilia collecting. The National Indy 500 Collectors Club is an independent active organization that has been dedicated to supporting such activities. The organization was established January 1, 1985, in Indianapolis by its founder John Blazier and includes an experienced membership available for discussion and advice on Indy 500 memorabilia trading and Indy 500 questions in general.

=== Entertainment ===
The Indianapolis 500 has been the subject of several films and has been referenced many times in television, movies, and other media.

=== Milk ===
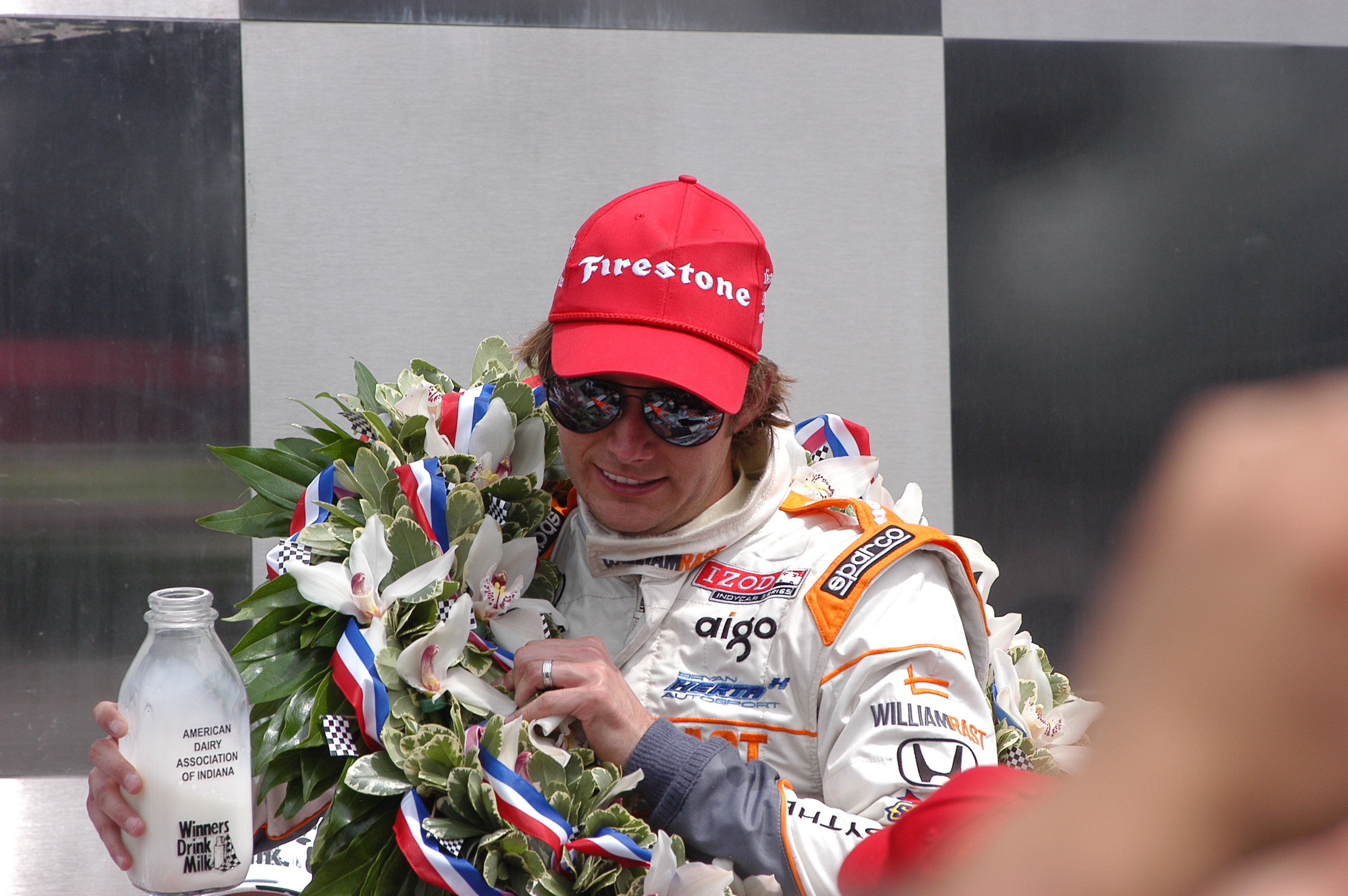
2011 winner Dan Wheldon holding a bottle of milk

Louis Meyer requested a glass of buttermilk after winning his second Indy 500 race in 1933. After winning his third title in 1936, he requested another glass but instead received a bottle. He was captured by a photographer in the act of swigging from the bottle while holding up three fingers to signify the third win. A local dairy company executive recognized the marketing opportunity in the image and, being unaware Meyer was drinking buttermilk, offered a bottle of milk to the winners of future races. Milk has been presented each year since then, apart from 1947 to 1955. Modern drivers are offered a choice of whole, 2%, and skim.

At the 1993 Indianapolis 500, winner Emerson Fittipaldi, who owned and operated an orange grove, notoriously drank orange juice instead of milk during the televised winner's interview. He eventually relented and also drank from the milk bottle later in the post-race ceremonies after the broadcast was over, but the public relations damage had already been done. The snub led to Fittipaldi being booed during driver introductions at the next race on the schedule, held at the Milwaukee Mile in Wisconsin, a state known for its dairy industry. Some continued to boo Fittipaldi as late as 2008, in which he drove the pace car.

In 2016, as a promotion, the track gave out commemorative bottles of milk to 100,000 attendees to toast the winner with milk after the race.

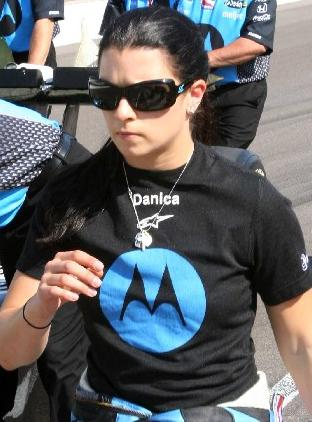
Danica Patrick on Pole Day at Indy, 2007

=== Female drivers ===
Female participation of any sort at Indianapolis was discouraged and essentially banned throughout the first several decades of competition. As such, female reporters were not even allowed in the pit area until 1971. There have been nine female drivers to qualify, starting with Janet Guthrie in 1977.

Sarah Fisher has competed nine times, the most of any woman. Danica Patrick holds the best finish (3rd) for a woman and is the only woman to have led laps during the race. Katherine Legge is the most recent woman to have competed in the race (2024), and holds the fastest one-lap (231.627 mph (372.768 km/h)) and four-lap (231.070 mph (371.871 km/h)) qualification speeds for a woman in the history of the race.

== Broadcasting ==
Radio coverage of the race dates back to 1922. The race has been broadcast live on the radio in its entirety by the Indianapolis Motor Speedway Radio Network since 1953.

The Hulmans did not allow live television coverage of the 500 until 1986, largely to maximize gate attendance. The race was briefly televised live in 1949 and 1950 on WFBM-TV (today's WRTV), after which the practice was discontinued. From 1964 to 1970, the race was broadcast live on closed-circuit television in theaters around the country. From 1965 through 1970, a highlighted version of the race was shown on ABC's Wide World of Sports. From 1971 through 1985, an edited same-day, tape delay broadcast of the race was shown in prime time. The race broadcast was edited down to either two or three hours in duration (including commercials).

From 1986 through 2018, ABC televised the race live in its entirety. However Indianapolis affiliate WRTV was required by the Speedway to blackout the national broadcast, and instead carry it on tape delay to encourage local race attendance. In 1992 the tape-delay broadcast was pushed forward to Sunday evenings.

In 2007 (the first year in which the race was carried under the ESPN on ABC branding), the race was first aired in high-definition. In 2016, the IMS declared a sell-out of race tickets for the 100th running of the event, meaning that WRTV would be allowed to air the race live for the first time since 1950.

Under the live coverage arrangement, the Indianapolis affiliate of the network airing the race airs that day's programming in a transposed arrangement, with network primetime programming airing during the race and transmitted to the affiliate in advance (for instance in 2019, WTHR aired the season finale of the NBC primetime series Good Girls at 2 p.m. local time), while the race airs on tape delay in prime time.

Coverage of time trials on ABC dates back to 1961. ABC covered time trials in various live and in tape-delayed formats from 1961 to 2008 and from 2014 to 2018. ESPN (and later along with ESPN2) carried various portions of time trials from 1987 to 2008. Versus covered time trials from 2009 to 2013. Practice sessions have been streamed live online dating back to at least 2001.

In 2019, coverage of the Indianapolis 500 moved to NBC, as part of a new three-year contract that unified the IndyCar Series' television rights with NBC Sports (the parent division of its cable partner NBCSN), and replaced the package of five races broadcast by ABC with an eight-race package on NBC. The Indianapolis 500 was one of the eight races; the contract ended ABC's 54-year tenure as broadcaster of the race. WTHR became the local broadcaster of the race under the contract; the existing blackout policy remained, though speedway officials left the door open to allowing WTHR to air the race live in the event of a sellout. In contrast with the usual sell-out policy, in 2020, the race aired live on WTHR, as the Speedway ran the first three meetings (NASCAR in July, the Indianapolis 500 in August, and Road to Indy in September) behind closed doors as a result of COVID-19 cases in the state (the third INDYCAR meeting, the October road course races, admitted 10,000 spectators each day). The race was also shown live in 2021 on WTHR due to the Indianapolis Motor Speedway's restricted capacity amid the ongoing COVID-19 pandemic. WPBI-LD2 in Lafayette also blacks out live coverage of the race as although Lafayette is its own television market, Indianapolis stations are easily accessible (and outside of Lafayette's CBS affiliate, were the only stations available to Lafayette viewers until the mid-2010s). WPBI-LD2 would therefore also air NBC's primetime programming in the afternoon along with WTHR whilst the race aired live across the rest of the network. The first day of qualifying is no longer broadcast on television and only available through streaming.

In 2022, the race was able to be viewed live within central Indiana and Lafayette; however, it was only available on the Peacock streaming service and was not available live on WTHR or WPBI-DT2. The race aired on tape delay as normal. In 2024, the blackout was lifted at 2:30 p.m. due to inclement weather causing delays.

Fox Sports took over rights to IndyCar, including the Indianapolis 500, beginning in 2025, with WXIN as its local outlet. On May 16, 2025, with IMS expecting a sellout, it was announced that the blackout would be lifted for the eighth time. The blackout was lifted for a ninth time in 2026 due to another expected grandstand sellout.

== See also ==
- Indianapolis 500 firsts
- Indianapolis 500 records
- Indianapolis 500 traditions
- Indianapolis 500 by year
- Indianapolis 500 pace cars
- Indianapolis 500 Rookie of the Year
- List of Indianapolis 500 winners
- List of Indianapolis 500 pole-sitters
- List of Indianapolis 500 lap leaders
- List of Indianapolis 500 broadcasters
- List of female Indianapolis 500 drivers
- List of fatalities at the Indianapolis Motor Speedway

Preceded by Grand Prix of Indianapolis	IndyCar Series; Indianapolis 500	Succeeded by Detroit Grand Prix
