= Keeton =

Defunct American motor vehicle manufacturer

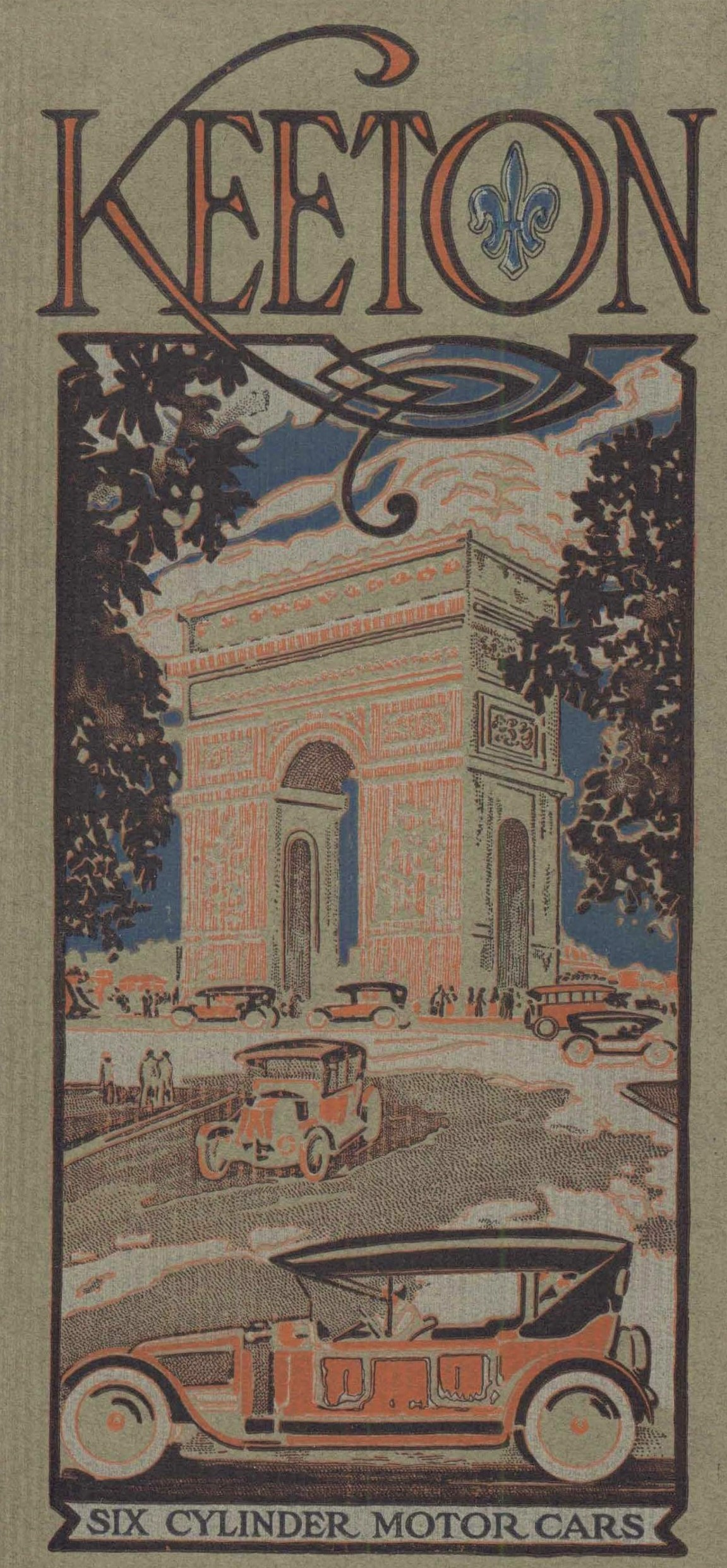
- 1913 Keeton Motor Car Brochure Cover

Overview
- Type: Automobiles
- Manufacturer: Keeton Motor Car Company
- Production: 1912–1914
- Assembly: Detroit
- Designer: Forrest M. Keeton

Chronology
- Predecessor: Croxton-Keeton

The Keeton was a brass era automobile built in Detroit, Michigan from 1912 to 1914 by the Keeton Motor Car Company.

== History ==
Designed by Forrest M. Keeton when he was associated with the Croxton-Keeton Motor Car Company, the Keeton was called a "French type" and had a bonnet like the contemporary Renault. Good sales resulted in the purchase of a larger factory in 1913, but under-capitalization caused Keeton to lose control of his company to new investors. A Keeton driven by Bob Burman participated in the 1913 Indianapolis 500 but caught fire and retired on the 55th lap.

In early 1914 Keeton was absorbed by American Voiturette. The last 100 Keeton's were sold by a receiver when that company failed in September 1914. In 1915, Forrest Keeton bought back the factory for a repair business.

== Models ==
The 1913 Keeton "Six-48" was a six-cylinder five-passenger tourer with left-hand steering, 12½ in (31.75 cm)-diameter electric headlights, starter, and horn. There were four forward speeds, speedometer, and the choice of wire spoked wood wheels. It had the radiator just in front of the cowl, behind the engine, the "proper and protected position", according to its ads. The folding top was mohair and the windshield folded. Like most cars of the era, it came standard with a tool kit, which in this case included an electric trouble light, tire iron, pump, jack, and tire patch. It sold for $2,750, equivalent to $89,583 in 2025.

Keeton also offered the five-seat Riverside Tourer and Meadowbrook Roadster at $2,750, the Tuxedo Coupé at $3,000, with a chassis price (suitable for custom coachwork, typical of the likes of Rolls-Royce or Pierce-Arrow at the time) of $2,250.

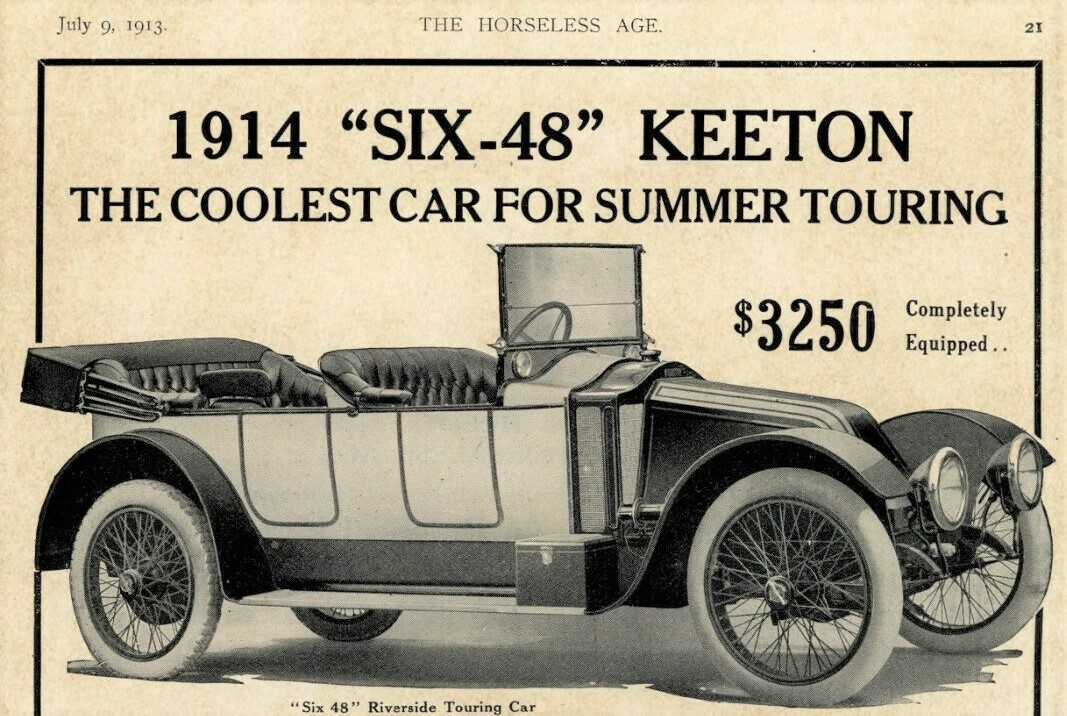
1914 Keeton 6-48 advertisement in the Horseless Age

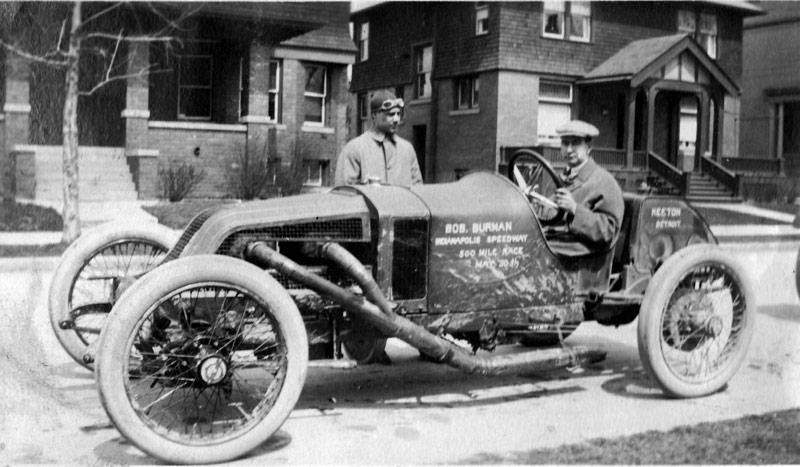
The Keeton raced by Bob Burman in the 1913 Indianapolis 500

== See also ==
- Brass Era Car
- List of defunct automobile manufacturers
