= Car-Nation =

Defunct American motor vehicle manufacturer

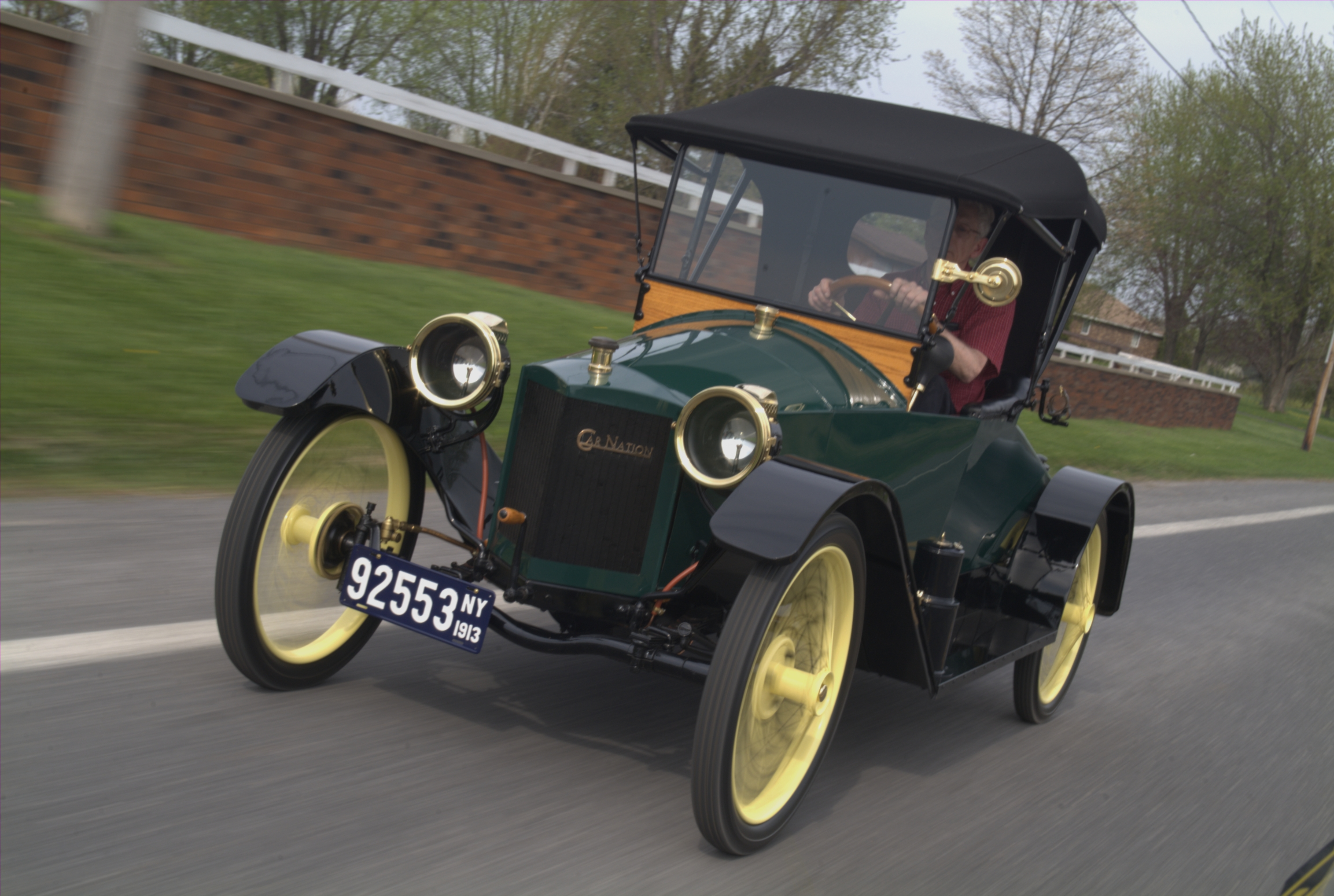
1913 Car-Nation roadster

The Car-Nation (also known as Carnation) was a brand of automobile manufactured in Detroit, Michigan, by the American Voiturette Company from 1913 to 1914.

The Car-Nation roadster was an 1,100 lb (500 kg) cyclecar costing $495. The vehicle had a four-cylinder Herreshoff "25" engine and a three-speed transmission.

Car-Nation also manufactured a larger four-seat Tourer model with a base price of $520. They also advertised a fore-and-aft tandem; it's not known if more than a few prototypes were produced. Two roadsters and five touring cars are known to survive.

In 1912, former Pope-Toledo manager Forrest Keeton moved his Keeton Towncar Works into a factory in Wyandotte, Michigan, a city south of Detroit on the shore of the Detroit River, and formed the Keeton Motor Company. He began construction of his first “French-like” car, the big Renault-influenced, air-cooled Keeton. It sold well enough to allow Keeton in 1913 to launch a second line of continental-influenced, low priced cars under a new name: Car-Nation. All that activity apparently attracted the attention of oil magnate Charles Schaeffer, and shortly after the introduction of the new car, the short-lived Car-Nation Motorette Co. and the existing Keeton Motor Co. unified under his ownership, reincorporating as the American Voiturette Company in Detroit.

Slow acceptance of the Car-Nation's nonstandard 48-inch (1,200 mm) gauge and reported problems with the Herreshoff engines in the Car-Nation sent the company into receivership in 1914. At a public auction in February 1915, Forest Keeton appears to have bought the assets of the company, including 60 Keetons and 350 Car-Nations, along with machine tools and countless thousands of parts. But while he did supply repairs, he never again built a car.

== Specifications (1913 Car-Nation roadster) ==
ENGINE Type: Herreshoff cast-iron L-head straight-four, integral valves, cast-en-bloc, Displacement 134 cubic inches (2,200 cc), Bore × stroke 3.375 inches (85.7 mm) x 3.75 inches (95 mm), Horsepower 18 (25 A.L.A.M.), Main bearings 2 nickel babbitt, Fuel system Gravity, Zenith updraft carburetor, alloy intake manifold, Ignition system 6-volt, Splitdorf fixed-spark magneto, Lubrication system Splash; plunger pump (note: Car-Nation advertised pressure lubrication, but it does not appear on any of the known cars), Exhaust system Single, iron

TRANSMISSION Type:Three-speed Detroit Gear & Machine sliding gear, cone clutch (note: early cars appear to have used an alloy clutch plate. Prone to cracking, later versions have a cast-iron clutch plate)

DIFFERENTIAL Type: Weston-Mott semi-floating

STEERING Type: Adjustable worm gear

BRAKES Type: Rod-actuated manual, Front - None, Rear -1¼ x 10-inch (250 mm) internal expanding emergency; external contracting service on transmission shaft

CHASSIS & BODY Construction: Full-frame riveted 1/8-inch channel steel, 1x3 ash sills, composite body, Body style - One door, two-passenger roadster, Layout - Front engine, rear-wheel drive

SUSPENSION Front - Quarter-elliptic leaf springs, Rear - Quarter-elliptic leaf springs

WHEELS & TIRES Wheels -Detachable Detroit Stanweld wire, Front/rear 30 x 3 inches

WEIGHTS & MEASURES - Wheelbase 105 inches (2,700 mm), Overall length 141 inches (3,600 mm), Overall width 57 inches (1,400 mm), Overall height 64 inches (1,600 mm); 73 inches (1,900 mm) with top, Front track 48 inches (1,200 mm), Rear track 48 inches (1,200 mm), Shipping weight 1,180 pounds (540 kg)

CAPACITIES Crankcase 3 quarts, Cooling system 8 quarts, Fuel tank 10 US gal (38 L; 8 imp gal), Transmission 8 pints, Rear axle 4 pints

CALCULATED DATA - bhp per c.i.d. 7.44, Weight per bhp 65.55 pounds (29.73 kg), Weight per c.i.d. 8.81 pounds (4.00 kg)

PERFORMANCE - Top speed 50 mph (80 km/h), Fuel mileage 25 mpg_{‑US} (9.4 L/100 km; 30 mpg_{‑imp}),

PRODUCTION - Car-Nation, total est. 2,000

== See also ==
- Brass Era car
