= Leo Goossen =

American draftsman, engineer, designer

- Born: June 7, 1892; Kalamazoo, Michigan, US
- Died: December 4, 1974 (aged 82); Los Angeles, California, US
- Occupations: Draftsman; Mechanical engineer; Automobile designer

Leo William Goossen (7 June 1892 – 4 December 1974) was an American draftsman, mechanical engineer and automobile designer. He is known for his work with Harry Miller and his long involvement in the design and ongoing development of the four-cylinder Offenhauser ("Offy") racing engine.

Goossen is considered to have been the preeminent American designer of racing engines over a fifty-year period that began in the early 1920s.

== Early years ==
Goossen's parents, Izaac and Kate, immigrated to the US from the Netherlands. They settled in Kalamazoo, Michigan, where Goossen was born. The family later moved to Flint, Michigan.

In 1908, Goossen left school at 16 to work as a blueprint machine operator in the engineering department of the Buick division of the nascent General Motors. He continued his education by taking classes in mathematics and engineering at night.

Goossen's work caught the attention of two of Buick's principals at the time: Chief Engineer Enos Anson (E.A.) de Waters and Engine Designer Walter E. Marr. When Marr retired and relocated to Chattanooga, Tennessee, he continued to work on special projects for the division. Goossen relocated to Chattanooga to collaborate with Marr.

In or around 1917, Goossen was diagnosed with tuberculosis, discovered during a military medical exam. He spent time in a sanatorium, but was told to relocate to a drier climate to complete his convalescence.

Goossen left Buick in January 1919, and moved to the southwestern US. While there he worked briefly as a cow-hand near Silver City, New Mexico.

From New Mexico, Goossen went to Los Angeles. He applied for a job at the Miller race car workshop, and presented a letter of reference written by Walter P. Chrysler. Goossen began working for Miller in August 1919.

== Automotive design career ==
=== 1910s ===
Goossen's design career started at Buick. Early on he was asked to create tracings for components used in the 1910 Buick 60 Special, also called the "Buick Bug". He designed the engine for a 1914 Buick cyclecar prototype. He was also involved in the design of the 1915 Buick "Twin-Six" V12 engine as well as a V6.

=== 1920s ===
After moving to Miller, one of Goossen's first projects was to produce drawings for an advanced racing car whose design was already completed. His first major engine project was to complete the design for the straight four-cylinder double overhead cam (DOHC) T-4 engine to power Edward Maier's "TNT Special", named for Maier's TNT Auto Company. Goossen's valvetrain designs included a variation of the cup tappets he had seen on a damaged Ballot engine, but in Goossen's design the upper surface of the tappet was radiused.

From December 1920 to January 1921 Goossen worked with racing driver Tommy Milton to design a new engine, which Milton then commissioned Miller to produce. Driver Ira Vail also ordered a copy of the engine. The engine was a DOHC straight-eight engine with four valves per cylinder, a barrel crankcase, tubular connecting rods, three main bearings and with cylinders and heads cast en bloc. This engine, called the Miller 183, set the pattern for many of Goossen's subsequent designs.

Changes to engine rules announced for the 1923 Indianapolis 500 prompted Miller to have Goossen design a reduced-displacement engine based on the 183 called the Miller 122. This engine appeared in 1922.

While many of the concepts developed on Goossen's drafting table came directly from Miller, the detail design was increasingly left up to Goossen. Miller himself did not have a formal engineering education. Eventually Miller stopped even checking Goossen's final drawings. Master machinist Fred Offenhauser used Goossen's drawings to produce the parts.

In 1923 Goossen took part in designing a front-wheel-drive system that was used in many of Miller's Indianapolis racers. Miller applied for a patent for the system in 1925, which was granted in 1927.

Miller's front-wheel-drive system was licensed by Errett Lobban Cord for use in the Cord L-29. Miller was paid $1000 per month licensing fee. For use in the Cord the system was extensively modified by Goossen and Cord engineer C. W. Van Ranst. The first prototype was running by 1927.

In 1922–23 Goossen produced a DOHC cylinder head conversion for the four-cylinder Ford Model T engine that was used by Harry Hooker in his "Hooker 99" special driven by Elbert "Babe" Stapp.

In 1926 Goossen produced a marine engine called the Miller 151. This engine was repurposed by some driver/owners for racing car use. It would go on to influence the four cylinder Offenhauser engine. Schofield produced a version of the 151 enlarged to 183 cu in (3.0 L). In 1930 Miller directed Goossen to draw up an even larger version. While a few engines of 200 cu in (3.3 L) were built, the engine was soon enlarged to 220 cu in (3.6 L).

Another new Miller Indianapolis straight-eight appeared in 1927. Called the Miller 91, it displaced just 91 cu in (1.5 L) and had two valves per cylinder. With the addition of a centrifugal supercharger the earliest 91s produced 148 hp (110.4 kW) while some later ones made as much as 285 hp (212.5 kW). Goossen called the Miller 91 his "baby".

Goossen designed a one-off flat-eight marine engine called the Miller 148. Built in 1928, it was used in the racing boat Miss Rioco III. Boat and engine crashed and sank on their maiden outing. The engine was later recovered and finally restored in 2007.

In an effort to increase the participation of major motor manufacturers at the Indianapolis 500, Speedway president Eddie Rickenbacker enacted a set of major rule changes for the 1930 race. The changes became known as the "Junk Formula", and they effectively obsoleted the Miller straight eight engines. In response, in 1929 Goossen designed a series of three cylinder head upgrades for the Model A engine: a high-compression flathead, an OHV that became known as the Miller Hi-Speed head, and a DOHC head.

Boat racer James A. Talbot hired Miller to design a pair of new engines to power a boat that would contest the 1929 British International Trophy, also known as "The Harmsworth Cup". Goossen and L. A. Orsatti shared responsibility for the design. Each engine was to be configured as a 24-cylinder "W" with eight cylinders per bank, and would use cylinders, valvetrain components, and ignition system parts from Liberty. The dual ignition system was driven by six eight-cylinder distributors. A new aluminum crankcase was designed that retained the 45° inter-bank angle of the donor Liberty engines, allowing the same timing to be used. Other new parts included the cams, cam housings, articulated rods and crankshafts. Each engine displaced 3,298 cu in (54.0 L) and developed an estimated 1,100 hp (820.3 kW) at 2600 rpm. The engine was called the Miller-Liberty 3300. The engines were installed in Talbot's boat, named the Miss Los Angeles II. As installed, the crankshaft rotation of one engine was opposite that of the other. Miss Los Angeles II finished second in the 1929 Harmsworth. Afterwards the engines were bought by the Cragar Corporation with the intention that they would power a car called America 1 in an attempt on the world land speed record, but the car was never built.

On 7 February 1929 Miller sold his company to the Schofield Corporation, which set up a subsidiary called the Miller Production Corporation Limited but which was commonly called Miller-Schofield. With US$5,000,000 of capitalization, the company was to manufacture Miller engines for aircraft, marine, and automotive use. From Miller the new company received machinery, drawings and patterns, and the rights to the series of performance cylinder heads designed by Goossen for Ford's Model A/B engine. The OHV version and a small number of the DOHC heads were built by Miller-Schofield. Goossen also went to Schofield, where his salary rose to $100 per month. In October 1929 the stock market crashed, and shortly after this Gilbert Beesemyer, one of Schofield's directors, admitted to having embezzled more than $8 million from the Guarantee Building & Loan Company. Schofield and the Miller Production Corporation filed for bankruptcy on 1 December 1930. Miller set up his own company again, with Goossen freelancing for him, including drawing up a 255 cu in (4,179 cc) four-cylinder at the behest of Offenhauser, who was running his own shop at this point and contracting back to Miller. Goossen did not join Offenhauser full-time until 1944. When Miller-Schofield failed, the Cragar company bought Miller-Schofield assets and put Goossen's OHV Model A/B heads back onto production.

=== 1930s ===
With financial backing from the Stutz Motor Company, engineer and racing driver Frank Lockhart built a streamliner called the Stutz Black Hawk Special to challenge the Land speed record. The engine for the car was built by Riley Brett. The powerplant consisted of two Miller 91 top ends mounted to a common crankcase at a 35° degree angle. The cylinder banks retained their individual crankshafts, which were geared together in the crankcase, with power leaving via an output gear mounted low in the case. The combined engines were supercharged, and Lockhart added two intercoolers. On April 25, 1928, the car went out of control during the return run of a record attempt at Daytona Beach, throwing Lockhart out to his death. The engine was salvaged, and later became the basis upon which the Sampson IC-30 Indy car of 1930 was built. Goossen became involved in the project at this time, working with Brett to design a new underslung chassis of box-section aluminum for the car. The front suspension used parallel quarter-elliptic leaf springs, while at the rear a De Dion tube was suspended on parallel torsion bars. The car appeared at the 1930 Indianapolis 500 for the first running of the so-called "Junk Formula". Driven by Louis Meyer, it took an early lead but had to pit for repairs. The car finished fourth.

Also appearing at Indianapolis in 1930 was a car called the Summers-Miller. Harry Hartz had Miller produce a revised straight-eight for it. Goossen began with the Miller 122, and enlarged it to 152 cu in (2.5 L). This engine was installed in the car and won the 1930 Indianapolis 500 in the hands of driver Billy Arnold.

In addition to the $1000 monthly licensing fee Miller received for the rights to his front-wheel-drive system, he was given a new Cord Brougham Sedan powered by a Lycoming straight-eight engine. Miller wanted a more powerful engine to replace the Lycoming. Goossen did the design for the new powerplant. The resulting engine was a V16 engine with two inline banks of eight cylinders set on a barrel crankcase with an included angle of 35° between banks. Each inline bank was made of two straight four cylinder modules with integral cylinder heads. Each cylinder head had two overhead camshafts and two valves per cylinder. Displacement was 303 cu in (5.0 L) and power output was 300 hp (223.7 kW). In 1931 this engine appeared in an Indianapolis racing car. The car was in third place when it pitted to have its sixteen plugs replaced due to fouling. It returned to the track and was running in seventh position when it had to retire due to a broken connecting rod. One year later the engine and car appeared again, but dropped out of the race due to a broken oil line.

At the 1931 Indianapolis race Miller met motorboat builder and racer Garfield Arthur "Gar" Wood. Wood wanted a pair of engines for a boat to take back the Water Speed Record from the British and their Rolls-Royce "R" aero V12 engines. Miller proposed a V16 like the 303, but much larger. Miller and Goossen designed the engine, while Ev Stevenson worked on the lubrication system and the cylinder heads. The engine was a four valve-per-cylinder DOHC V16 with a 54° angle between cylinder banks and one Schwitzer-Cummins supercharger per bank supplying air at 10 psi (68.9 kPa). The original bore and stroke were 4.375 in × 4.50 in (111 mm × 114 mm), but Wood's request for an even larger engine resulted in the bore being raised to 4.4375 in (113 mm) for a final displacement of 1,113.5 cu in (18.2 L). Each engine developed approximately 1,800 hp (1,342.3 kW) at 6000 rpm. The engines were installed in Wood's Miss America VIII. After failing to take the world record during an attempt on 25 October 1931, Wood sold the engines without the superchargers. Boat and engines were eventually reunited.

After the 1931 Indy, Miller proposed building two copies of an advanced four-wheel drive car for the 1932 race as a promotional tool for the FWD Company of Clintonville, Wisconsin. Goossen contributed a new 308 cu in (5.0 L) DOHC V8 engine with a 180° crankshaft, a split crankcase, and babbit main bearings with removable bearing caps. The cars appeared at Indy in 1932, one sponsored by the FWD Company, the other by William A. M. Burden, a descendant of Cornelius Vanderbilt. Both cars retired.

Prior to the 1932 Indy race Hartz had gone to Miller's revived racing shop asking for another increase in displacement. In March 1932 Goossen used the same methods he used to produce the 1930 152 engine to create a new straight-eight that displaced 183 cu in (3.0 L). A four-cylinder derivative of this engine was the basis of the Miller Midget engine.

Miller and Goossen were invited to Burden's home to discuss a project for a unique road car. Burden and Victor Emanuel wanted Miller to build two copies of the most exclusive, highest performance road car of the time. Emanuel later dropped out of the project, so just a single copy was completed. The car was a long-nosed roadster with four-wheel drive and another V16 for an engine. Displacement was close to that of the earlier 303 engine, but the cylinder banks were separated by 45° in the Burden engine, and it was supercharged. Goossen estimated power to have been 500 hp (372.8 kW). Completion of the car was delayed by Miller's bankruptcy, but it was eventually delivered. Burden sold the car back to the factory for $600.00.

On 8 July 1933 Miller's creditors filed an application for involuntary bankruptcy against Harry A. Miller Inc. Offenhauser's claims against Miller were settled in exchange for machine tools from Miller's Gramercy shop. Patterns for the Miller 220 engine also ended up with Offenhauser. Goossen never recovered his lost wages, forcing him and his wife to move out of their home to smaller accommodations.

In 1933, at Offenhauser's request, Goossen extensively revised the 220 engine incorporating features from Miller's V16 and the Miller Midget engine that was essentially half of a Miller 183 straight eight, as well as ideas from other experimenters such as Art Sparks. For 1934 the engine was initially called the Miller/Offenhauser, but was renamed "Offenhauser" one year later. In 1937 the engine grew again, to 270 cu in (4.4 L).

In the mid-1930s Preston Tucker began to promote the idea of a Ford flathead V8-powered Indianapolis racer to Ford. In February 1935 Ford accepted the idea. Tucker turned to Miller to design a modern chassis for the car. The cars would be front-wheel drive, using Ford flathead V8s with Bohnalite cylinder heads. Goossen contributed the design of a new transfer case for the front-wheel drive cars. Four cars appeared at Indianapolis on 12 May 1935, with Miller as the sponsor. None of the cars finished.

Driver Wilbur Shaw asked Goossen to design a new car for the 1935 Indianapolis 500. The project was financed by Gil Pirrung. Construction took place over the winter of 1934/35 in the Los Angeles area. Goossen designed a front-wheel drive system that was both stronger and simpler than that used by Miller. The four cylinder, eight valve engine displaced 220 cu in (3.6 L), and was one of the first two engines officially called "Offenhauser". The car, called either the "Pirrung Special" or the "1935 Shaw Indy Special", appeared at Indy in 1935, where it finished second.

In August 1936 Goossen was hired by Sparks to design a new inline six-cylinder engine incorporating Sparks' ideas for the Indianapolis 500. The engine, later known as the "Big Six", was a 336 cu in (5.5 L) DOHC 2 valve-per-cylinder inline six that was fed by a centrifugal supercharger. It was manufactured by Offenhauser with final assembly by Sparks own people. It set fastest qualifying lap at Indianapolis in 1937, but retired due to supercharger problems.

Goossen and Offenhauser were involved in a redesign of the clutch in the Thunderbolt land speed record car following a clutch failure during its 6 November 1937 run. The revised clutch was used for the car's record attempt on 19 November 1937. Owner/driver George Eyston set a new land speed record of 311.42 mph and became, at 501.18 kph, the first person to travel more than 500 kilometers per hour.

In 1938 the Bowes Seal Fast Special, also called the Stevens/Winfield Special, appeared at Indy. The car was built by Myron Stevens, with partners Louis Meyer, Al Jones, and Bob Bowes of the Bowes Seal Fast patch company. Jones and Meyer later dropped out of the project, although Meyer would drive the car at Indy in 1938 and 1939. With input from William Clement "Bud" Winfield, Goossen designed a supercharged DOHC 179 cu in (2.9 L) straight-eight. There were two valves per cylinder, with an included angle of 84° degrees between them. The engine used torsion bars in the camshafts to both drive the supercharger and absorb shocks from changing drive loads. Goossen tried vane and Roots style superchargers before finally settling on a Miller centrifugal blower. After Meyer retired from racing, driver Rex Mays posted some good results with the car.

In 1938 industrialist Lew Welch and Winfield embarked on a project to build a new V8 powered Indy car. Goossen worked on the engine, which was a DOHC V8. Cylinders and heads were cast en bloc in banks of four, with a larger separation between cylinders 2–3 than between 1–2 and 3–4. There was one intake and one exhaust valve in each hemispherical combustion chamber, with an 84° included angle between the valves. The cylinder banks were attached to an alloy barrel crankcase. The flat-plane crankshaft ran in three bearings. Engine bore was 3.185 in (81 mm), and stroke was 2.84 in (72 mm); total displacement was 181 cu in (3.0 L). Induction was boosted by means of a 10 in (254 mm) centrifugal supercharger driven by straight-cut gears and running at 5.35 times engine rpm, delivering up to 30 psi (206.8 kPa) of boost. Since it was intended to be installed in a front-drive chassis, the camshaft drive was at the flywheel end of the engine, while the supercharger was mounted at the opposite end. Power output was estimated to have been 450 hp (335.6 kW). The engine first appeared at the 1941 Indianapolis 500 in a rebodied 1935 Miller-Ford front-wheel-drive chassis and renamed as another "Bowes Seal Fast Special". Driven by Ralph Hepburn, the car finished in fourth place.

=== 1940s ===
In 1943 Goossen designed the front-wheel drive transaxle for Lou Moore's Blue Crown Specials.

At the 1946 Indy the V8 engine built for the 1941 race reappeared. Power was now up to 510 hp (380.3 kW). Goossen had designed a new front-wheel-drive chassis that was then built by Frank Kurtis. The car was called the Novi Governor Special, and its powerplant the Novi engine. The engine became famous for its distinctive sound.

In 1946 Offenhauser sold his company to Lou Meyer and Dale Drake, who formed Meyer & Drake and continued production and development of the Offy engine. Leo Goossen stayed on with Meyer & Drake as chief engineer.

=== 1950s ===
Beginning in 1953, Goossen reengineered the Meyer & Drake engine to be mounted laid over to just 18° above horizontal to reduce the car's centre of gravity. This required many other changes, including a new crankcase and a new cover for the lower camshaft housing, among other things.

Racing promoter and team owner J. C. Agajanian decided to develop an Indianapolis engine based on the Studebaker V8 stock block. He hired Goossen to design new cylinder heads, resulting in a set of DOHC cylinder heads with four valves per cylinder. The Studebaker block was bored an additional 3/16 in (4.76 mm) to 3.5625 in (90.5 mm) while the stock stroke of 3.25 in (82.6 mm) was retained on early engines, resulting in a displacement of 259 cu in (4.2 L). With a compression ratio of 12.8:1 suitable for methanol fuel and the addition of a dry-sump and Hilborn fuel injection, maximum power output was estimated to have been 372 hp (277.4 kW) at 7200 rpm.

For the 1955 Indianapolis 500 businessman and racing team owner Howard Keck hired Travers and Coon to develop an all new streamlined Indy car. Goossen was hired to designed the engine, which was to have been a V8. Keck terminated the project and withdrew from racing before the 1955 race.

In 1938 Joe Lencki, mechanic, team owner and developer of Lenckite (later renamed zMAX microlubricant), went to Goossen to have an engine designed embodying some of Lencki's ideas. Goossen designed a 270 cu in (4.4 L) DOHC inline six cylinder engine with two valves per cylinder in a hemispherical combustion chamber. The engine was built in the Offenhauser shop. At the 1939 Indianapolis this engine, in the Burd Piston Rings Special, retired due to a fuel pump failure. In 1940 Lencki went back to Goossen for a revised engine, one with a new cylinder head with four valves per cylinder in a pent-roof combustion chamber and a block that displaced 260 cu in (4.3 L). At that year's Indy the car retired with a thrown piston rod.

In the late 1950s Goossen collaborated with Arnold Birner to develop a DOHC multivalve cylinder head for the four cylinder Pontiac Trophy 4 engine. Installed in a lakester owned by Julian Doty and built by August "Gus" Sommerfeld and Robert "Baldy" Baldwin of B and S Garage, the engine was first run in 1960.

=== 1960s ===
In the early 1960s, Goossen provided consulting services to Ford during the development of that manufacturer's Indy V8 DOHC racing engines. Meyer & Drake Offy engine serial number 215 was bought by Ford through their "Auto Lite" division on 31 August 1962 to study before designing their new DOHC Indy V8. It is believed to have influenced the Ford engine.

While at Meyer & Drake Goossen mentored Ed Donovan, and also designed the original gear drives for Donovan's company.

In June 1958 Lance Reventlow decided to build a Formula One car. The chassis was designed by young engineer Marshall Whitfield and built by Troutman and Barnes. Reventlow hired Goossen to design an engine specifically for the project, fabrication of which would be handled by Travers and Coon of Traco. An all new design, the Scarab F1 engine was an inline four cylinder engine, laid over to 11° from horizontal. The crankcase and cylinder block was one piece, cast in light alloy. The cylinders had press-in wet liners. Final bore and stroke were 3.75 in × 3.375 in (95.3 mm × 85.7 mm), resulting in a displacement of just over 149 cu in (2.4 L). The cylinder head was detachable. The engine was noteworthy for using desmodromic valve actuation for the two valves, set at an 84° included angle, in each cylinder's hemispherical combustion chamber. The desmodromic system was based on the one used by Mercedes Benz on their 300SLR, a car Traco had access to. Each cylinder had two sparkplugs. Power output was estimated to be in the range of 210–230 hp (156.6–171.5 kW). Two cars were tested at Riverside International Raceway before being sent to Europe for the 1960 Monaco Grand Prix. The cars' best finish was a tenth place at the 1960 US Grand Prix.

In 1965 Lou Meyer sold his share of Meyer & Drake to become a distributor of the Ford Indy DOHC V8. Dale Drake reorganized as Drake Engineering. Goossen stayed with Drake as Chief Design Engineer.

=== 1970s ===
The final version of the Offy lineage that Goossen worked on was what became known as the Drake-Goossen-Sparks (DGS), an engine with displacement reduced to 183 cu in (3.0 L) with the addition of turbocharging. He produced drawings for this revision during the winter of 1973–1974, delivering them shortly before his death in 1974.

Over the course of his career Goossen is credited with designing twenty-four engines and half as many complete cars. It is said that he never attended a race.

== Personal life ==
Goossen married Vera A. Babbs, a teacher, in 1929 at Coconino station, Arizona.

Vera Goossen died on 18 February 1935, not long after the couple had adopted daughter Marilyn.

In November 1974 Goossen suffered a stroke and was hospitalized. He died in Los Angeles, California on 4 December 1974.

== Legacy ==
- In 1967 Goossen received a Distinguished Service Citation Award from the Automotive Hall of Fame.
- 1978 inductee into the Indianapolis Motor Speedway Museum.
- Enshrined in the American Auto Racing Writers & Broadcasters Association's Hall of Honor in 1979.
- 1994 inductee into the National Sprint Car Hall of Fame.
