= Mishaps of the New York–Paris Race =

- Directed by: Georges Méliès
- Production company: Star Film Company
- Release date: 1908
- Running time: 380 meters Approx. 24 minutes (14 fps)
- Country: France
- Language: Silent

Mishaps of the New York–Paris Race (French: Le Raid New York–Paris en automobile) is a 1908 French silent comedy film directed by Georges Méliès. Inspired by the real 1908 New York to Paris Race, which concluded shortly before its release, the film followed a group of racers through a hectic series of unlikely obstacles and adventures across North America, Russia, and Western Europe in a highly unreliable race car.

Film scholars have noted parallels to earlier Méliès films, including The Impossible Voyage and An Adventurous Automobile Trip, and have commented on elements of satire and racism in the scenario, but the film itself is currently presumed lost.

== Plot ==
In New York City, an automobile race to Paris is launched. A large crowd, including a Salvation Army brass band, sees off the six racecars, including a De Dion-Bouton driven by Georges Bourcier de Saint-Chaffray, a Motobloc, a steam automobile, and even a kitchen on wheels, where a black visitor is hurried out before the race begins. The cars speed over the precipices of the Rocky Mountains, where they navigate a rickety bridge over a torrent; though the De Dion-Bouton speeds easily over the bridge, it breaks under the weight of the next car, hurling it into the water. The other four cars, going too fast to be able to stop, follow it over the precipice. The De Dion-Bouton, now alone, continues its journey as far as the plains of California, where it suffers a breakdown just as it is being attacked by a group of Iroquois. The abducted travelers, about to be scalped, escape by getting their captors drunk on gasoline. They regain their car only to realize that, having used up their gasoline in the ruse, they cannot start the engine. Taking some feathered Iroquois headdresses to use as sails, they convert the automobile into a sail wagon and travel on the wind.

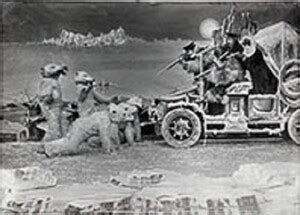
Polar bears confront the automobile in a still from the film

The weather gets worse, and a cyclone carries the car into the sky. It flies over Canada and finally makes a crash landing on a frozen Alaska river. Finding a horse to pull the car, they reach a gold mining camp. In welcome, the miners take them on a tour of a glittering mine and give them two boxes of gold. The travelers set off again with sled dogs pulling their car. They make it as far as the Bering Strait before the dogs are tired out and can go no further. An ice avalanche sends the car into the sea, where a whale accidentally swallows it. The whale spits out the car on an ice field, where the travelers see a pack of polar bears approaching. Just when an attack seems imminent, it becomes clear that the bears come in peace, thinking the fur-covered travelers are bears as well. Humans and bears exchange hearty handshakes and conversation, until they notice that the airship Patrie is being blown toward them by the strong wind. The travelers make a dash for the airship, managing to fasten one of its guide ropes to the car.

The airship carries the car to Siberia, where some poor serfs agree to pull the car over the ice. They pass through villages, where the travelers are greeted with welcome, vodka, and displays of ice skating. Reaching Germany, the travelers are still unable to make their car work, and call upon a caravan of Romani people to pull it onward for a while. At last, their car in shambles, carried along by a Paris coachman's nag, they reach the finish line at the Place de la Concorde, where the police chief Louis Lépine and the President of France have arrived to greet them. The travelers, distributing their souvenirs of the journey to the crowd, are carried in triumph through the streets of Paris.

== Background and production ==
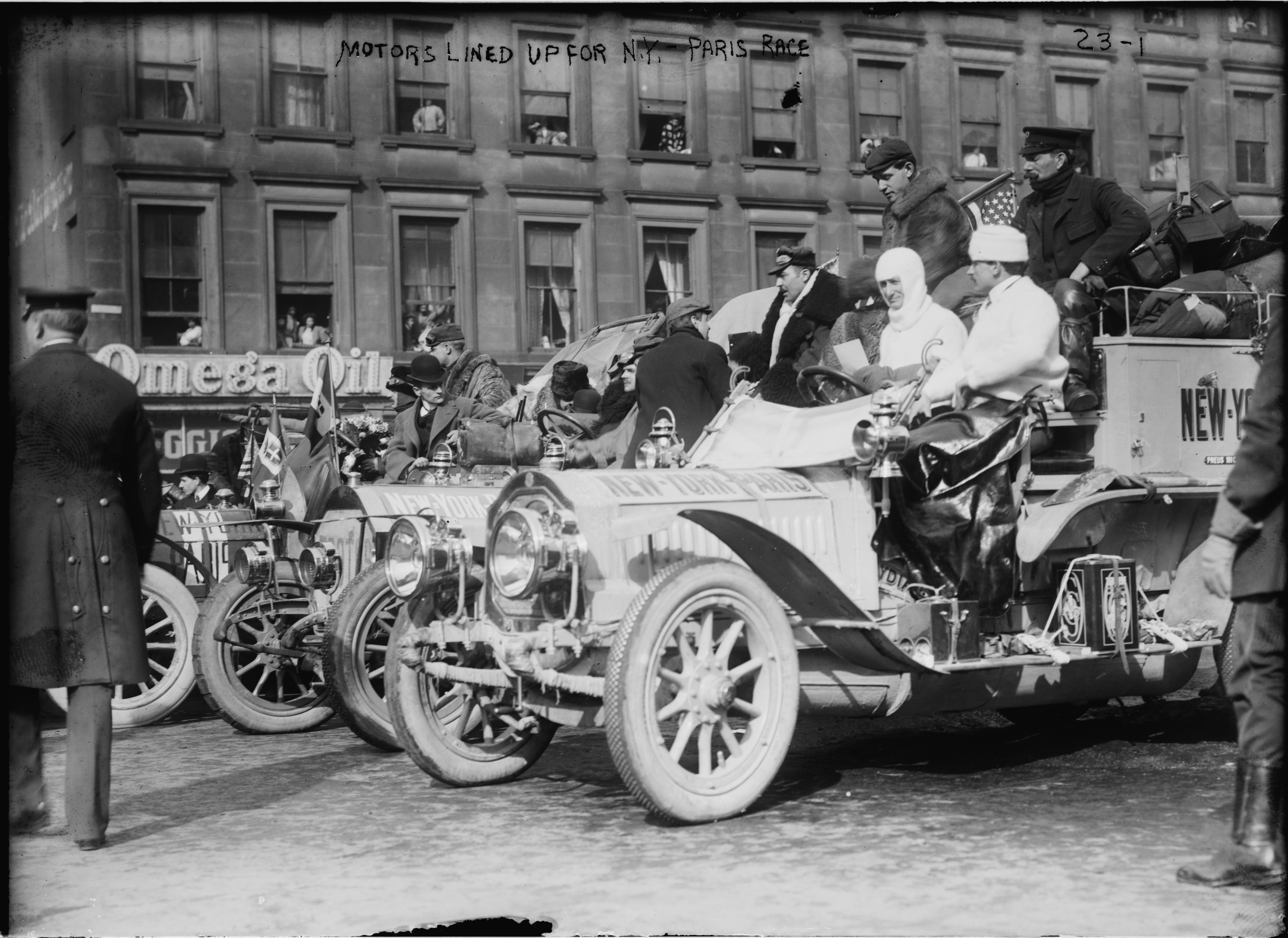
The racers in the real 1908 race lining up in New York, with the De Dion-Bouton in front

Throughout his film career, from 1898's Divers at Work on the Wreck of the "Maine" to 1912's The Conquest of the Pole, the pioneering filmmaker Georges Méliès drew freely on topical themes taken from current events; Mishaps of the New York–Paris Race is another example of this technique. The real-life 1908 New York to Paris Race, sponsored by Le Matin and The New York Times, set off on February 12, 1908. George Schuster was declared the winner on July 30 upon his arrival in Paris; Georges Bourcier de Saint-Chaffray, the racer sponsored by Jules-Albert de Dion of the De Dion-Bouton company, left the race in Siberia when de Dion decided to stop funding him. In addition to featuring Bourcier de Saint-Chaffray as the main character of the film, Méliès's scenario also namedrops the airship Patrie and, back in Paris, Louis Lépine, the Préfet de Police for the Paris Police Prefecture.

In addition to its real-life inspiration, the plot of Mishaps of the New York–Paris Race was influenced by one of Méliès's own most successful films, the 1905 comedy An Adventurous Automobile Trip. Mishaps of the New York–Paris Race returns to the theme of a madcap automobile journey, and also recalls another successful Méliès film, The Impossible Voyage (1904). Mishaps of the New York–Paris Race was made mostly in Méliès's glass-roofed studios in Montreuil-sous-Bois; the second, tenth, and twenty-sixth scenes (titled "Les couriers," "L'Alaska," and "La place de la Concorde" in advertising material) were shot just outside, in the garden of Méliès's property.

== Release and reception ==
The film was released in July 1908 by Méliès's Star Film Company, and is numbered 1199–1217 in its catalogues. The film was advertised as being 380 meters long, which, at Méliès's preferred projection speed of 12 to 14 frames per second, is about 24 minutes. According to a 1912 film journal article, the film was included as an attraction in a 1908 Théâtre Marigny revue in Paris.

The art historian Paul Hammond described the film as "a sarcastic travelogue", tracing thematic parallels with Alfred Jarry's 1902 novel Supermale. The film scholar Elizabeth Ezra noted racist overtones in the surviving scenario for the film, citing the scene in which the kitchen-car is visited by a black man: "The very presence of an African is represented as one more 'mishap', a nuisance to be repelled". The real race used as Méliès's source returned to the screen in 1965, when it was adapted into the comedy The Great Race.

Mishaps of the New York–Paris Race is currently presumed lost.
