= Bergdoll Motor Car Company =

Automobile brand

Bergdoll
- Industry: Automobiles
- Founded: 1909; 117 years ago
- Defunct: 1913; 113 years ago
- Headquarters: Philadelphia PA
- Key people: Louis J. Bergdoll

The Bergdoll was a brand of automobile made in Philadelphia, Pennsylvania from 1910 to 1913. The company created a line of high quality four cylinder cars, which were capable of going as fast as 60 miles an hour.

== History ==
The Bergdoll Motor Car Co. was formed around the turn of the century (around 1905) in Philadelphia Pa. The company would advertise in the beginning years as a distributor for the American Locomotive Company, or ALCO. The firm would over the next few years sell various brands including the Chalmers-Detroit and Ruanch & Lang electric car. The company would be headed by Louis John Bergdoll.

Factory August 1910

In 1908 the company would begin running motorized taxicabs. By 1909 they had 30 Thomas landaulets running. the company would then change strategy and instead of buying cars from the Thomas company they would instead build their own vehicles for taxi service. The initial plan was announced in August 1909, and they company hoped to have 15 of their own "Bergdoll thirties" on the road by early September and have 50 running by the end of October.

In early 1910 the firm would incorporate at $500,000 with Louis Bergdoll, F.R Hansell, and J.A Macpeak being listed as the incorporators. In 1910 the name Bergdoll Motor Car Co. would be replaced by the name "Louis J. Bergdoll Motor Company" or a new firm would be created to manufacture cars, and the company would begin to advertise automobiles for sale. The first car advertised would the Bergdoll Model 30.

Around 1911 the company would begin using the name "Louis J. Bergdoll Motor Company".

== Models ==
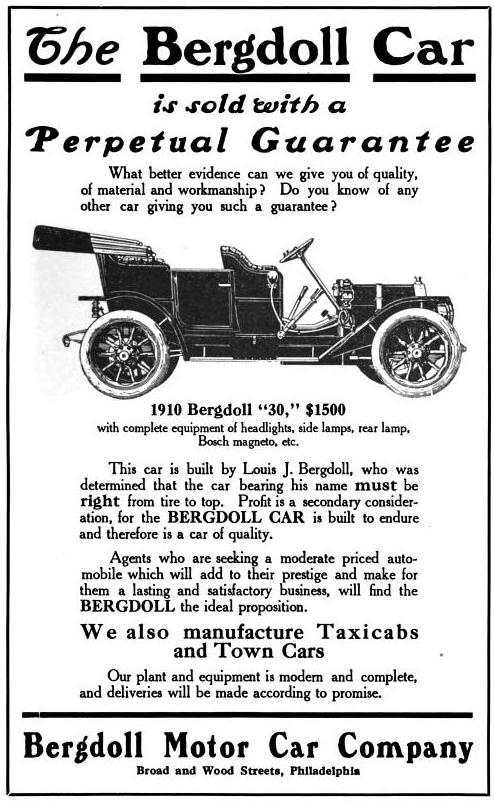
Bergdoll Model 30 1910

Bergdoll taxi (1910)

Bergdoll would create two distinct models in various body styles, the Model 30 and Model 40. The 30 and 40 designations indicated horsepower for the models.

=== Model 30 ===
The Model 30 would begin production in 1909 and would initially be made as a taxicab for the company's use. In the first year around 50 were made, and were put into service. In 1910 the company would begin to advertise the Model 30 for sale to the public.

The standard color for the body was "Richelieu Blue" with turquoise pin striping and the running gear was yellow. The upholstery was described by the company as "adequate". The highlight of the Model 30 was the engine which was a four cylinder en bloc engine. Horsepower was rated at the A.L.A.M. rating of 25.60 and used splash lubrication. There were three forward speeds and a reverse from a sliding transmission. Ignition was by Atwater-Kent and a magneto and battery were both used.

Pricing was from $1500 for a touring car, and up to $2600 for a landaulet. There were 9 body styles offered for the 1911 model year, including a taxi, coupe, and limousine. All cars were on the same 115 inch wheelbase, and the chassis and engine weighed 1450 pounds.
