= 1908 New York to Paris Race =

Multi-country auto race

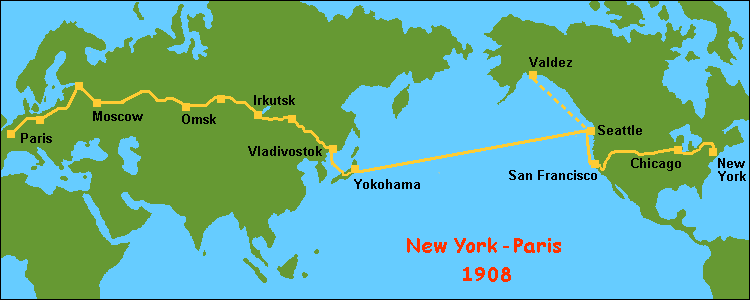
Map of the route

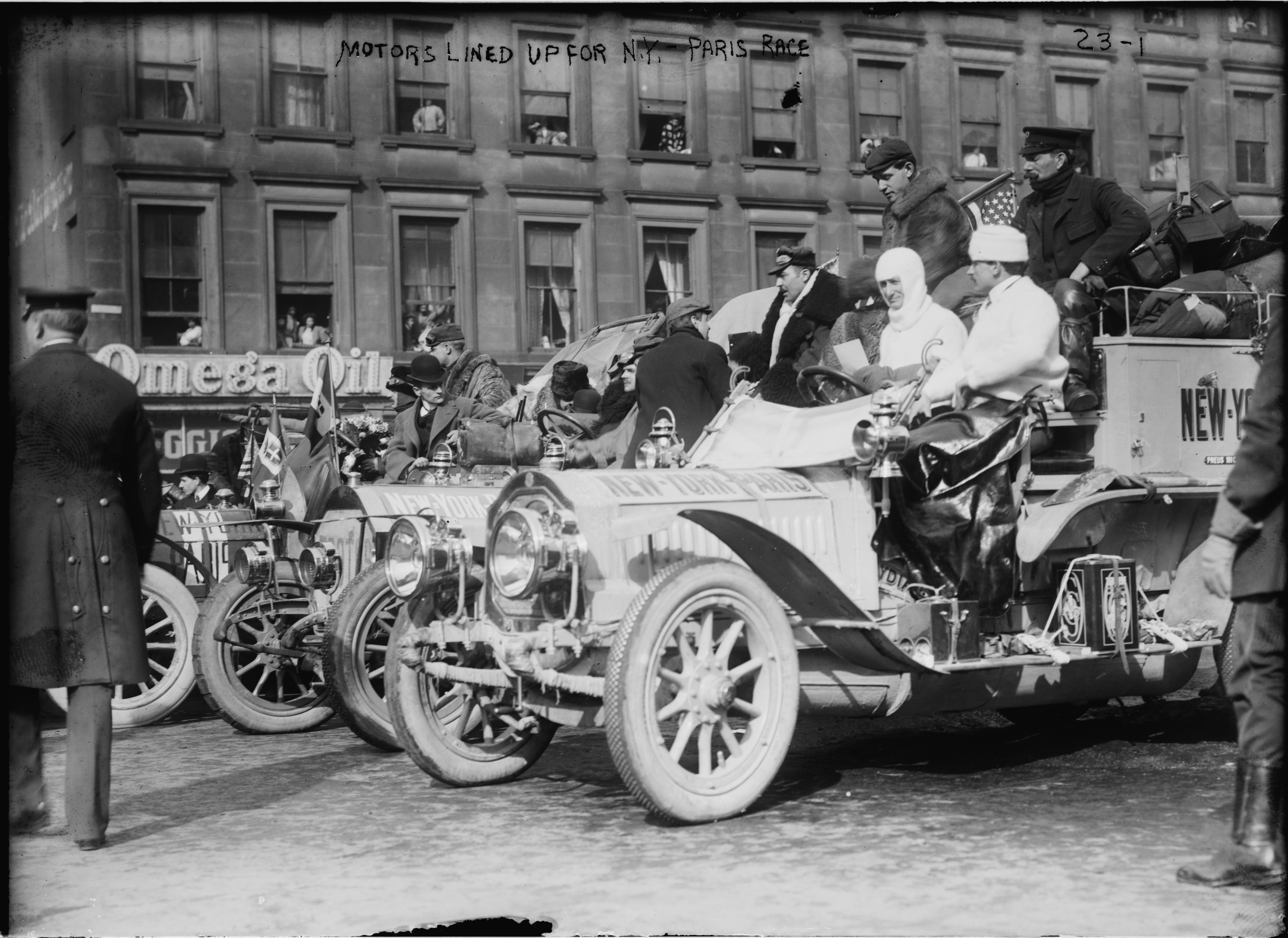
Cars lined up for the start: De Dion-Bouton (in front), Protos, Motobloc

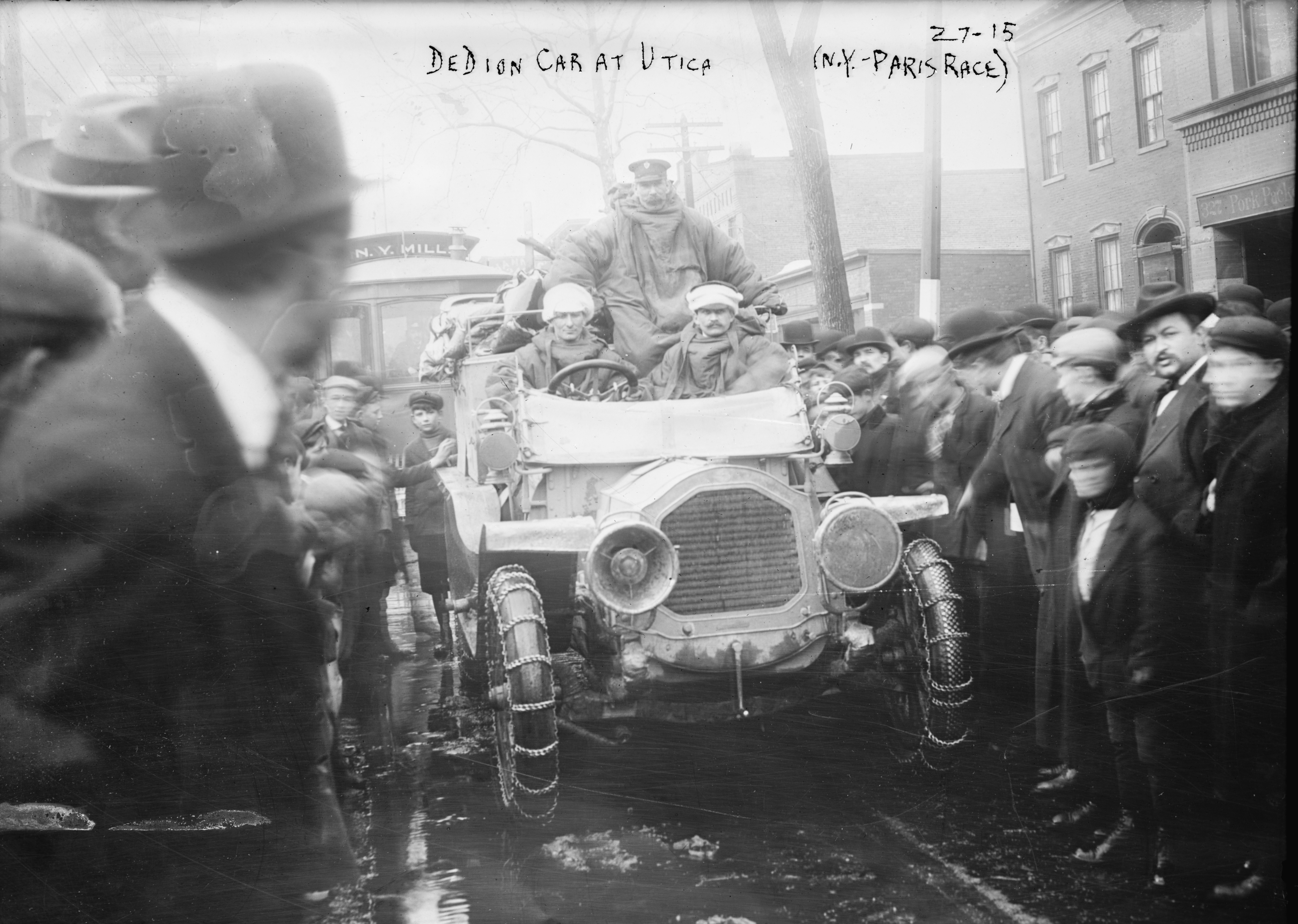
De Dion-Bouton car at Utica

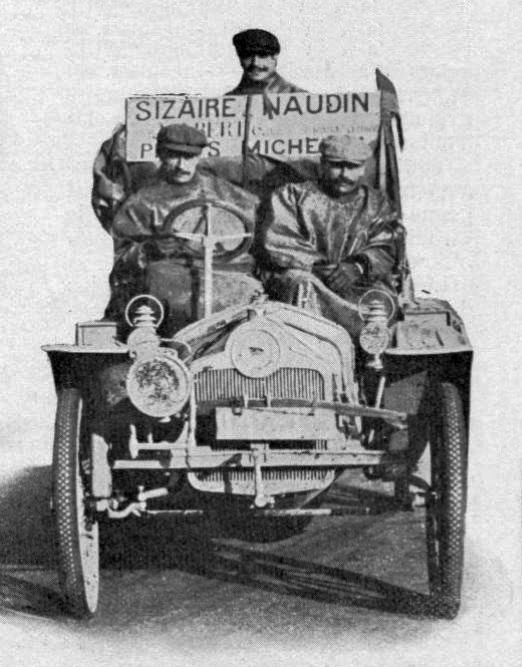
The Sizaire-Naudin of Pons, Deschamps and Berlhe

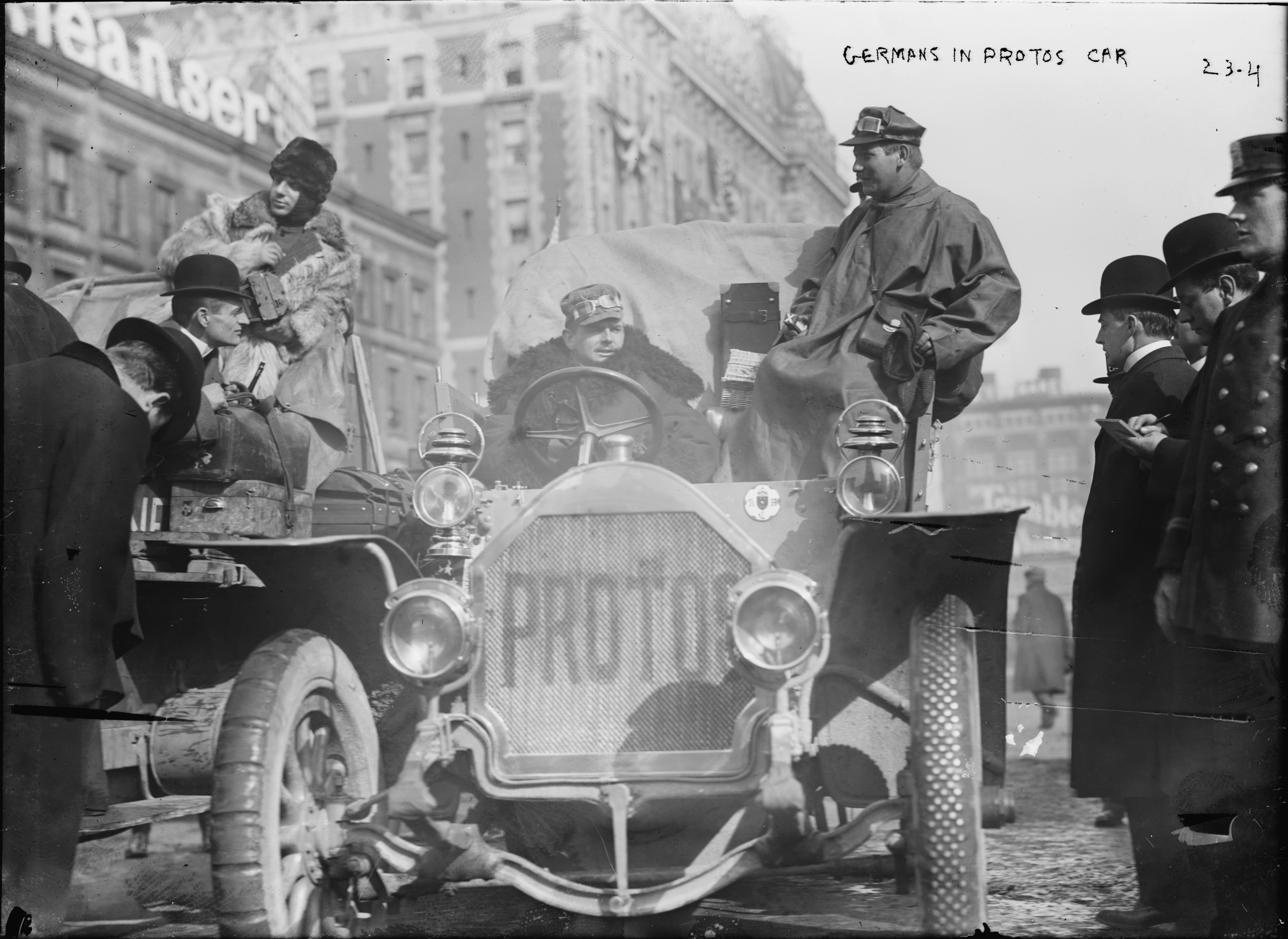
Germans in Protos car 1908 New York to Paris Race

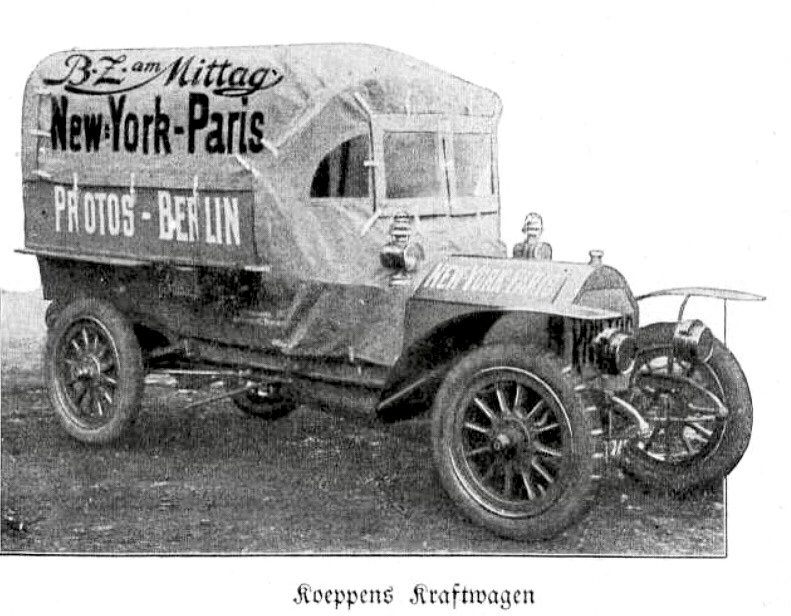
Protos New York - Paris (1908)

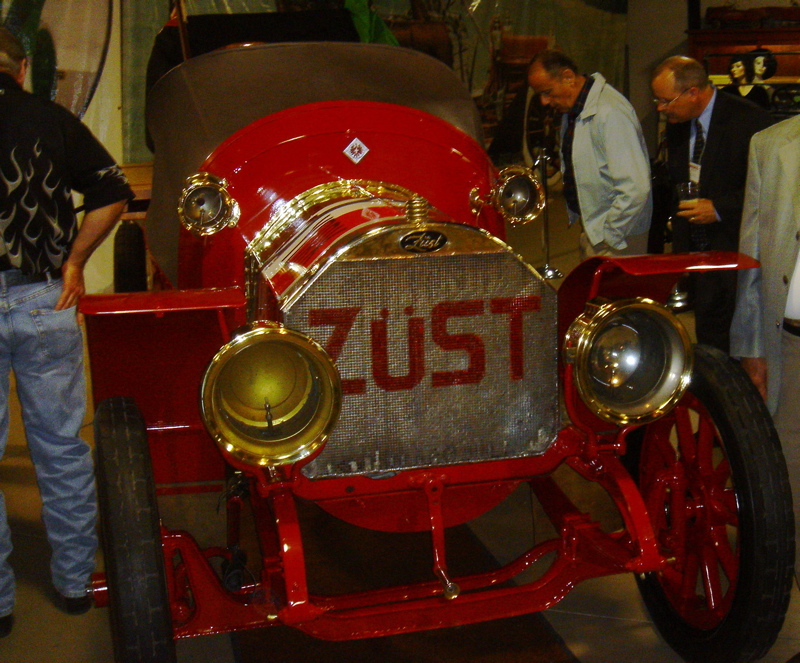
The 1906 Züst which took third place in the 1908 Race Around the World.

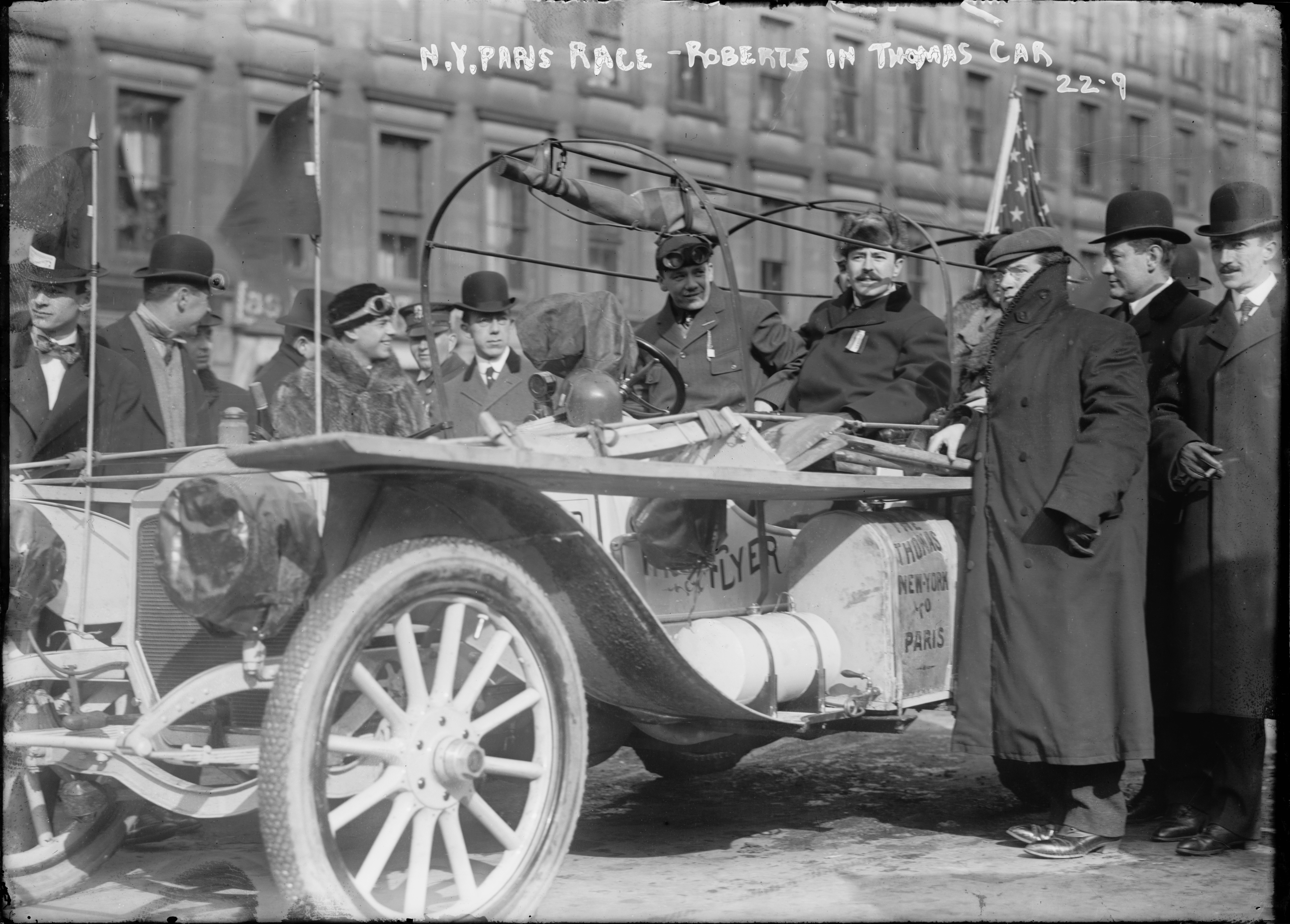
The race winners

The 1908 New York to Paris Race was an automobile competition consisting of drivers attempting to travel from New York to Paris. This was a considerable challenge given the state of automobile technology and road infrastructure at the time. Only three of six contestants completed the course. The winner was the American team, driving a 1907 Thomas Flyer.

In 1907 the Peking to Paris automobile race had inspired an even bolder test of these new machines. The following year the course would be from New York City, US, to Paris, France, with a planned 150-mile (240 km) ship passage from Nome, Alaska, across the Bering Strait to East Cape, Siberia.

== The 1908 New York to Paris Race ==
The race commenced in Times Square on February 12, 1908. Six cars representing four nations were at the starting line for what would become a 169-day ordeal (making it, in terms of time taken, still the longest motorsport event ever held). The nations represented in the race were Germany, France, Italy, and the United States. Three of the competitors (De Dion-Bouton, Motobloc, and Sizaire-Naudin) represented France, while Germany, Italy, and the US were represented by a Protos, a Zust, and a Thomas, respectively. At 11:15 AM, a gunshot signaled the start of the race. Ahead of the competitors were very few paved roads, and in many parts of the world no roads at all. Often, the teams resorted to straddling locomotive rails with their cars riding tie to tie on balloon tires for hundreds of miles when no roads could be found.

The American Thomas Flyer was in the lead at the end of the United States leg, arriving in San Francisco in 41 days, 8 hours, and 15 minutes. It was the first crossing of the US by an automobile in winter.

The route then took them to Valdez, Alaska, by ship. The Thomas crew found impossible conditions in Alaska and the race was rerouted across the Pacific by steamer to Japan where the Americans made their way across to the Sea of Japan. The race then went on to Vladivostok, Siberia, by ship, to begin crossing the continents of Asia and Europe. Only three of the competitors made it past Vladivostok: the Protos, the Züst, and the Thomas.

The wet plains of Siberia and Manchuria during the spring thaw made progress difficult. At several points, forward movement was often measured in feet rather than miles per hour. Eventually, the roads improved as Europe approached and the Thomas Flyer arrived in Paris on July 30, 1908, having covered approx 16,700 km to win the race. The Germans, whose Protos car was driven by Hans Koeppen, had arrived in Paris four days earlier, but were penalized a total of thirty days for not going through Japan and for shipping the Protos part of the way by railcar. That gave the win to the Americans, represented by driver George Schuster, who remains the only American to travel the full distance from New York to Paris. The winning margin was 26 days, still the largest winning margin in any motorsport event ever. The Italians arrived much later and finished third in September 1908.

The race was of international interest with daily front-page coverage by The New York Times (a cosponsor of the race with the Parisian newspaper Le Matin). The significance of the event extended far beyond the race itself. Together with the Peking to Paris race, which had taken place the year before, it established the reliability of the automobile as a dependable means of transportation, eventually taking the automobile from an amusement of the rich to a reliable and viable means of long-distance transportation for the masses. It also led to the call for improved roads to be constructed in many parts of the world.

The winning driver, George Schuster, was inducted into the Automotive Hall of Fame on October 12, 2010.

The winning Thomas Flyer is on display in Reno, Nevada, at the National Automobile Museum, alongside the trophy.

== World Race 2011 ==
While a planned Great Race 2008 was cancelled as the approval and permits to travel through China were recalled, a second effort was mounted in 2011. World Race 2011 began in Times Square April 14, 2011, as competitors set out to retrace the route taken in 1908 from New York to Paris. Ultimately, four of the starting vehicles, a 1929 Ford Model A, a 1932 Ford 3 Window Coupe, a 1967 Volkswagen Beetle, and a multi-fueled 2007 Chevrolet Corvette, reached the Eiffel Tower in Paris on July 21, 2011. Participating in the 2011 race was Jeff Mahl, the great-grandson of George Schuster, the winning driver of the 1908 New York to Paris Race.

== In popular culture ==
- The 1908 movie Mishaps of the New York–Paris Race, directed by Georges Méliès, was inspired by the race.
- The 1965 movie The Great Race was loosely inspired by the 1908 New York to Paris Race, though heavily fictionalized for comedy.
- The 2008 TV documentary The Greatest Auto Race on Earth tells the story of the race.
- Wolfgang Ettlich (Dir.): Hat der Motor eine Seele? 1908 im Auto um die Welt. (D, 2008, German) 86 min. (Does an engine have a soul? Around the world by car in 1908.)
- The June 2, 2014 Episode of Futility Closet podcast focuses on this race.
- Episode 323 of American podcast The Dollop focuses on the New York to Paris Race.
- Episode 503 of Suspense radio show "Around the World", broadcast on April 6, 1953.
- 2017 fictional novel, The Perils of Paulie, written by Katie MacAlister, was published featuring a reality TV show that recreated the race using restored versions of the original cars.
- 2021 episodes 8 and 9 of The Buffalo History Museum Podcast "The 1908 New York to Paris Race, Parts I & II" written by Lindsey Lauren Visser focus on the 1908 New York to Paris Car Race.

== See also ==
- Harriet White Fisher, first woman to complete a full drive around the world.

== Literature ==
- London Daily Mail, various articles during 1907 and 1908.
- "New York to Paris Auto Race Route", in New York Times, various articles during 1907 and 1908.
- The Story of the New York to Paris Race, 1908, E.R.Thomas Motor Co., Buffalo, NY (reprinted by Floyd Clymer, Los Angeles, 1951 and Intrepid Publishing Co., 1992 ISBN 0-9625793-2-7).
- Cole, Dermot (1991). Hard Driving: The 1908 Auto Race from New York to Paris. New York: Paragon House. ISBN 1-55778-360-8.
- Fenster, Julie M. (2005). Race of the Century: The Heroic True Story of the 1908 New York to Paris Auto Race. New York: Crown Publishers. ISBN 0-609-61096-1.
- Frady, Jackie L; Michael Sion; Cindie Geddes (2007). Against All Odds: The Great New York to Paris Automobile Race of 1908. Reno, Nev: National Automobile Museum, Harrah Collection. ISBN 978-0-9800703-0-9.
- Jackson, Robert B (1965). Road Race Round the World: New York to Paris, 1908. New York: H. Z. Walck. (revised edition 1977, ISBN 0-8098-0003-9)
- Singer, G. S. (2012). King of all Men. Georgia: Third Millennium Publishing. (ASIN B006Z2ERIS)

== Sources ==
- The Great Auto Race.
- National Automobile Museum
