= Thomas Motor Company =

American car manufacturer (1900–19)

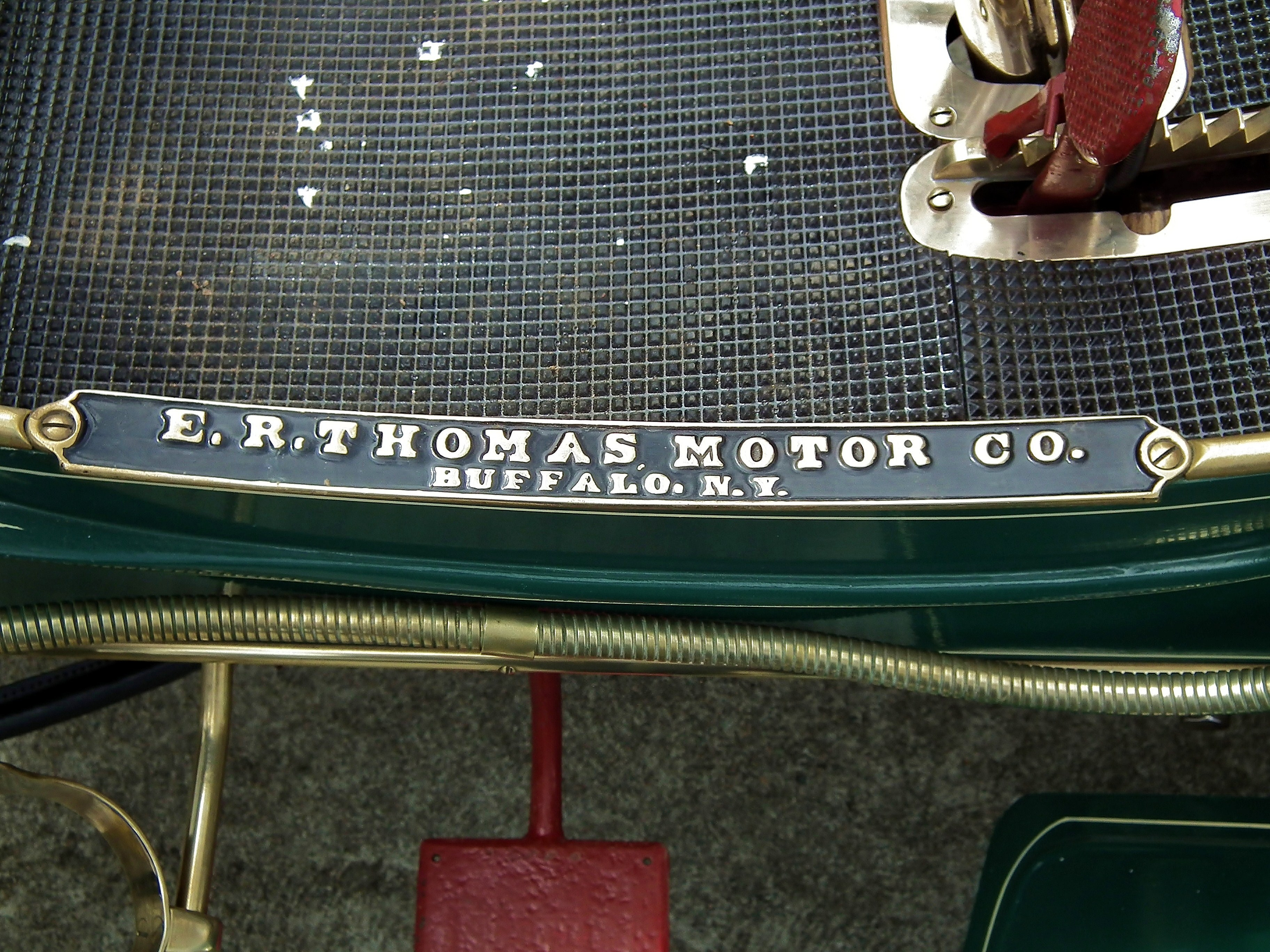
- Industry: Automobile
- Founded: 1900
- Founder: Edwin Ross Thomas
- Defunct: 1919
- Fate: receivership and finally shut down between 1918 and 1919.
- Headquarters: Buffalo, New York, USA
- Products: Motorized bicycles; tricycles; motorcycles; Open touring car

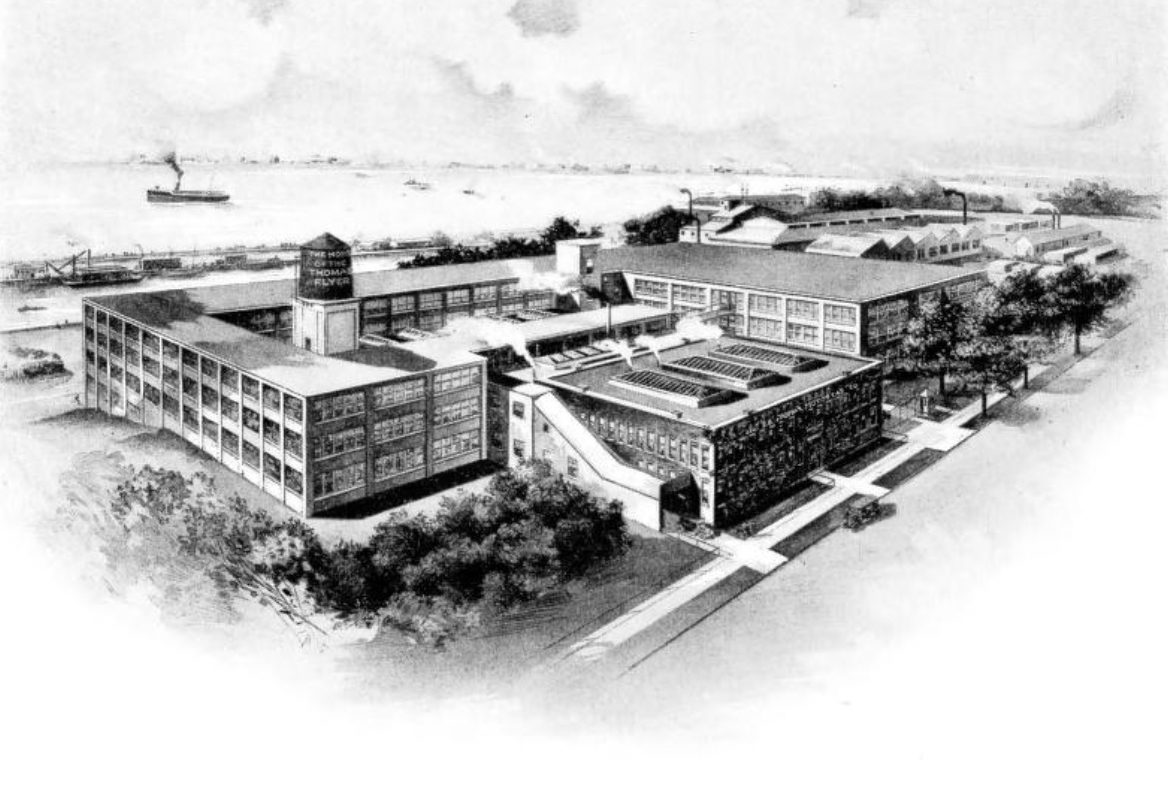
Thomas Plant

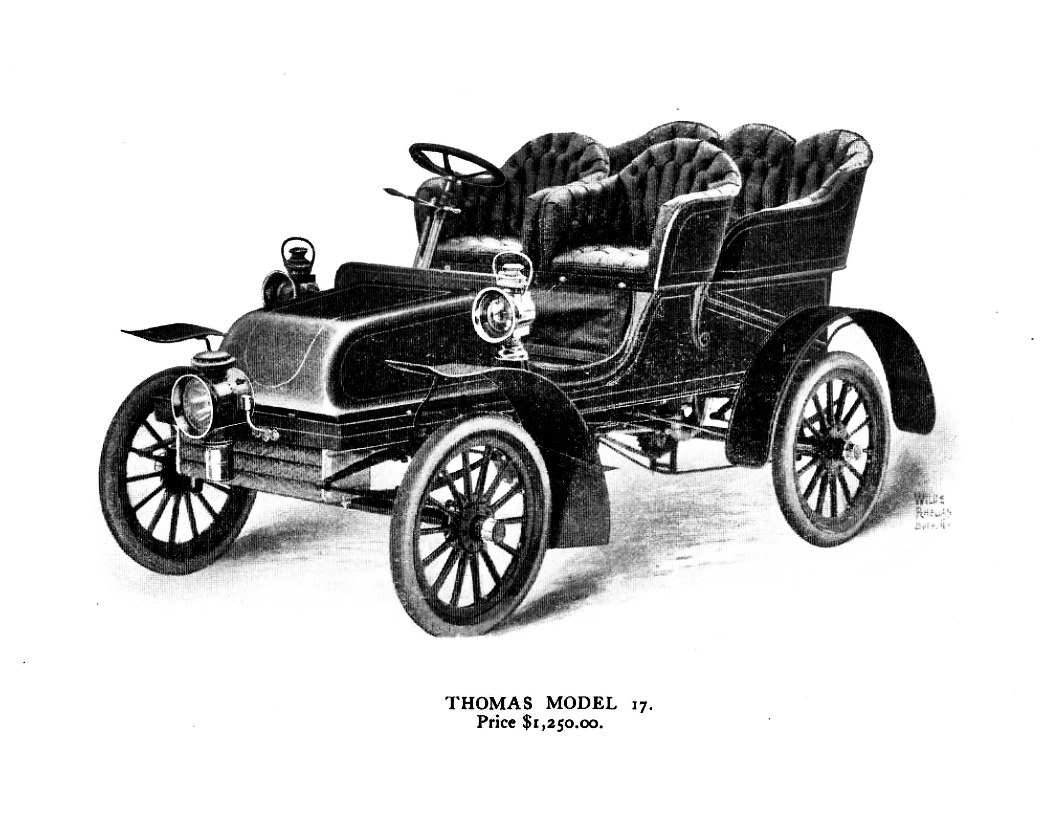
Thomas Model 17 (1903)

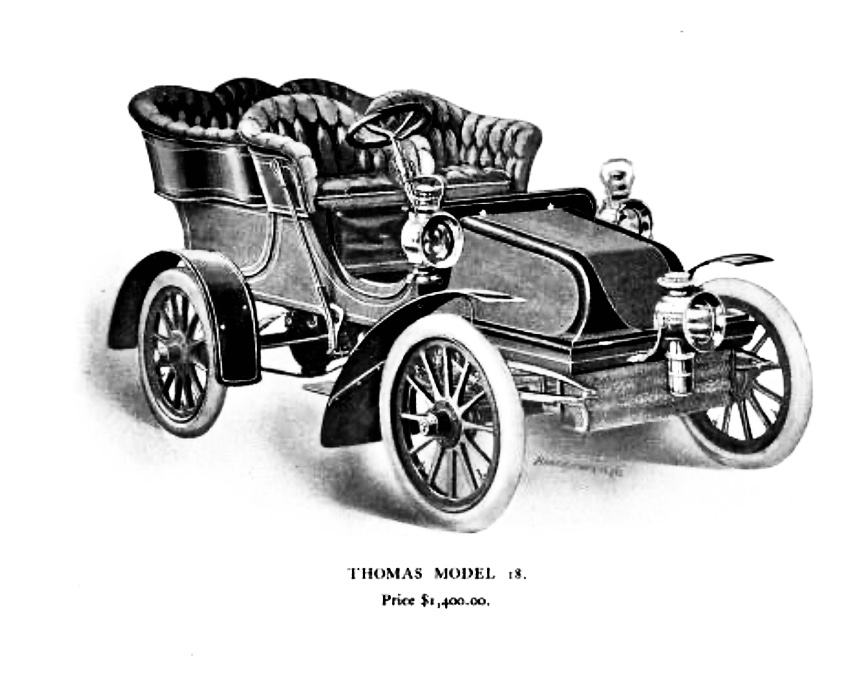
Thomas Model 18 (1903)

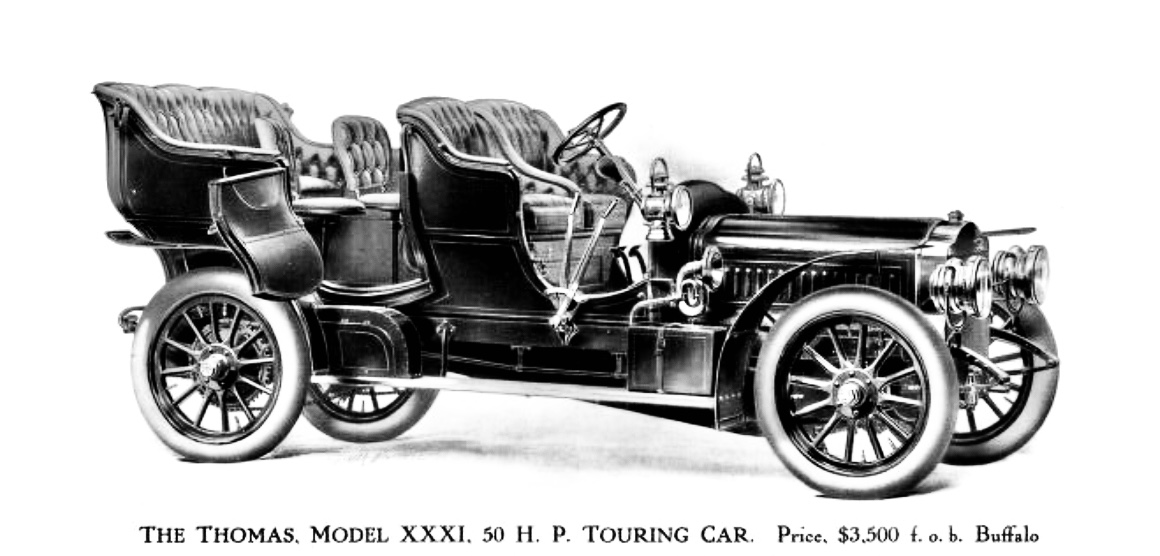
Thomas Model 31 (1906)

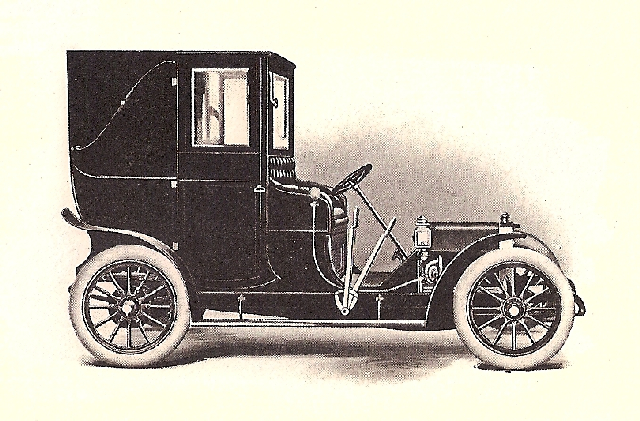
1908 Thomas 4-20 Town Car

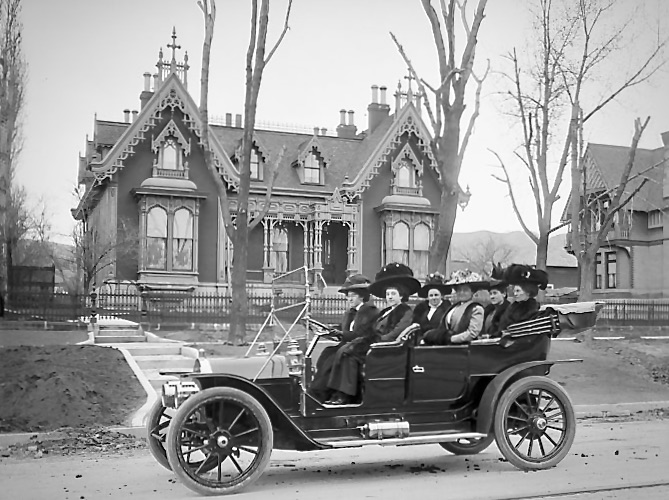
1909 Thomas Flyer in an upscale Salt Lake City suburb

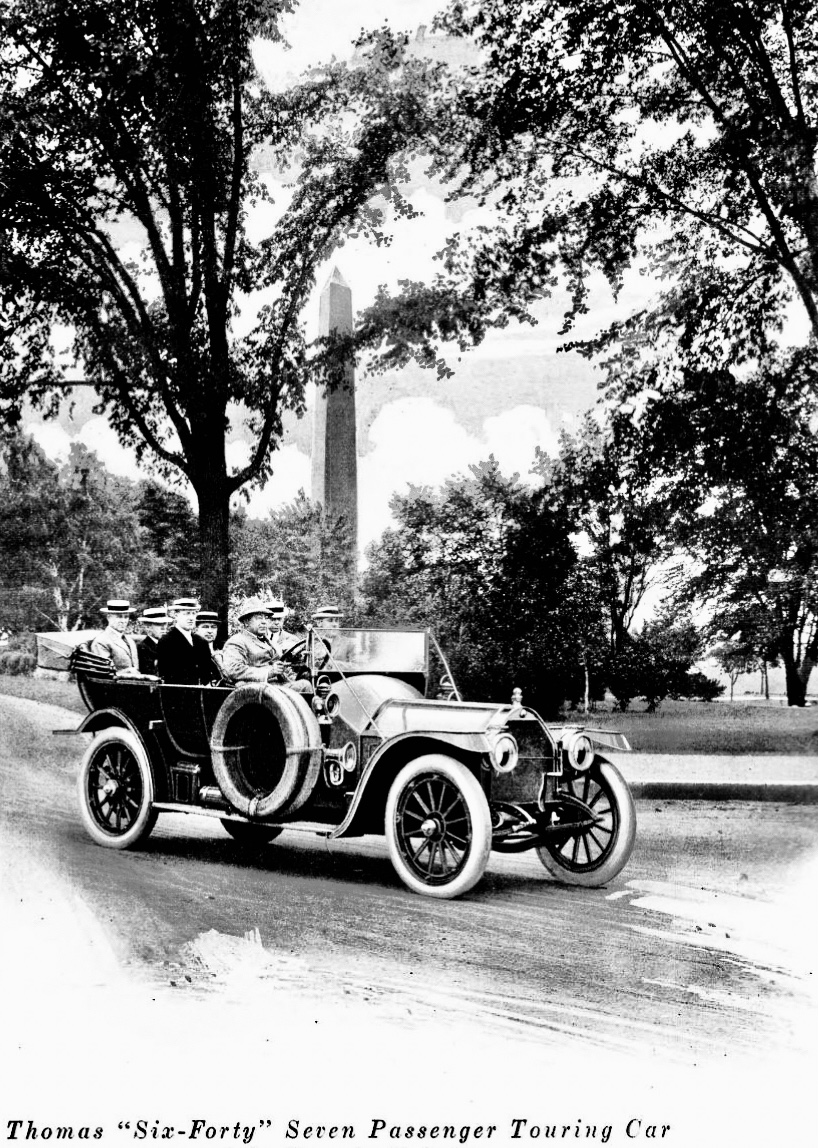
Thomas Model M 6-40 Touring Car (1910-1912)

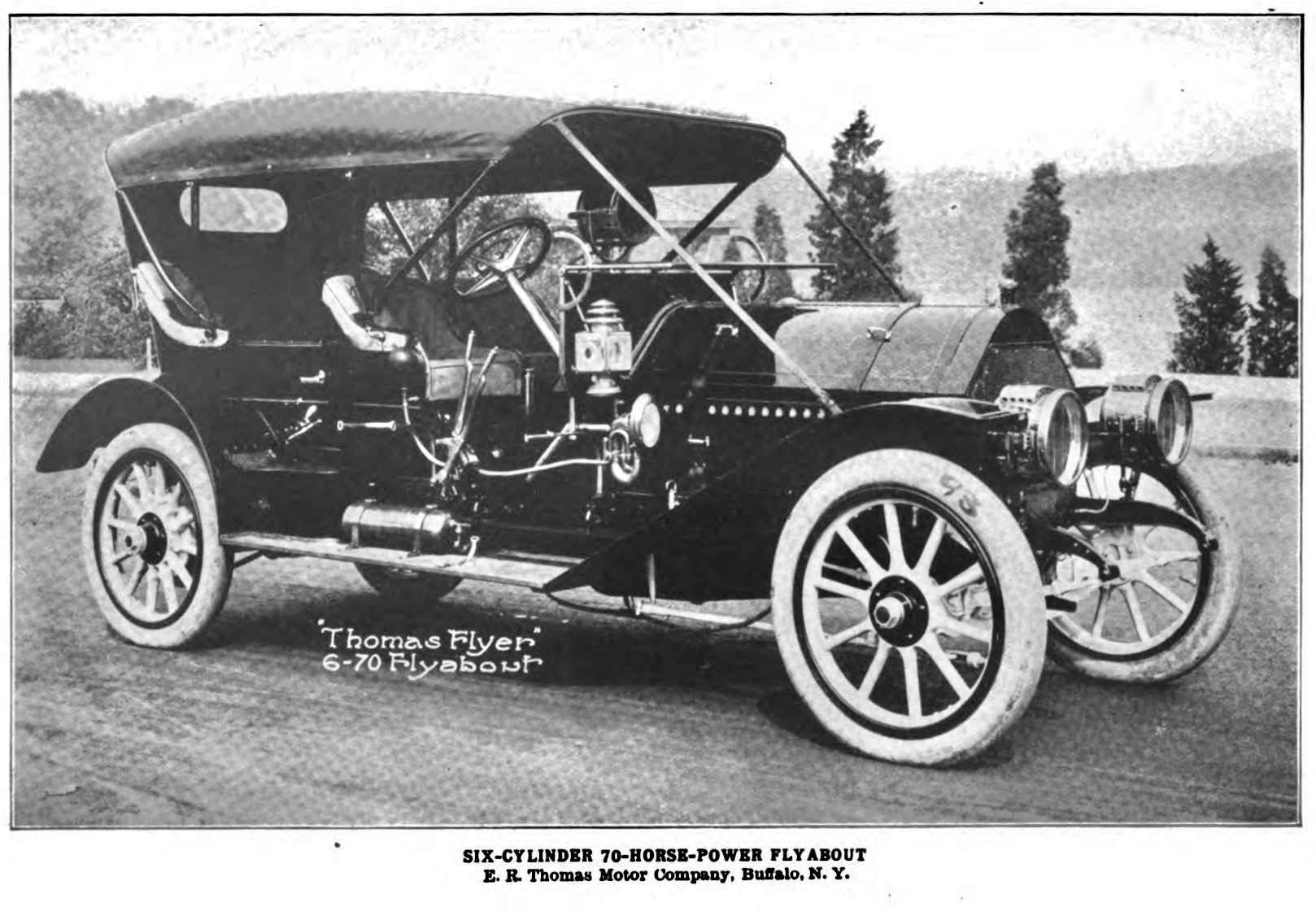
Thomas Flyer K 6-70

E. R. Thomas Motor Company was a manufacturer of motorized bicycles, motorized tricycles, motorcycles, and automobiles in Buffalo, New York between 1900 and 1919.

== Motorized bicycles, tricycles, and motorcycles ==
In 1896, Edwin Ross Thomas (1850–1936) of Buffalo, New York began selling gasoline engine kits for propelling ordinary bicycles. After forming the Thomas Motor Company, he began selling complete motor-assisted bicycles under the name Thomas Auto-Bi. The Auto-Bi is generally considered to be the first production motorized bicycle made in the United States. By 1903, the company was the largest manufacturer of single-cylinder, air-cooled engines. The Thomas Auto-Bi was later joined by the Auto-Tri, a three-wheeled motorcycle, and the Auto-Two Tri, a motorcycle that could hold three riders.

In 1905, the Thomas Auto-Bi established a new record for a transcontinental crossing of the United States in 48 days. By 1912, the demand for motorcycles had dropped significantly, and the Thomas Motor company discontinued all production of two-wheeled machines.

== Automobiles ==
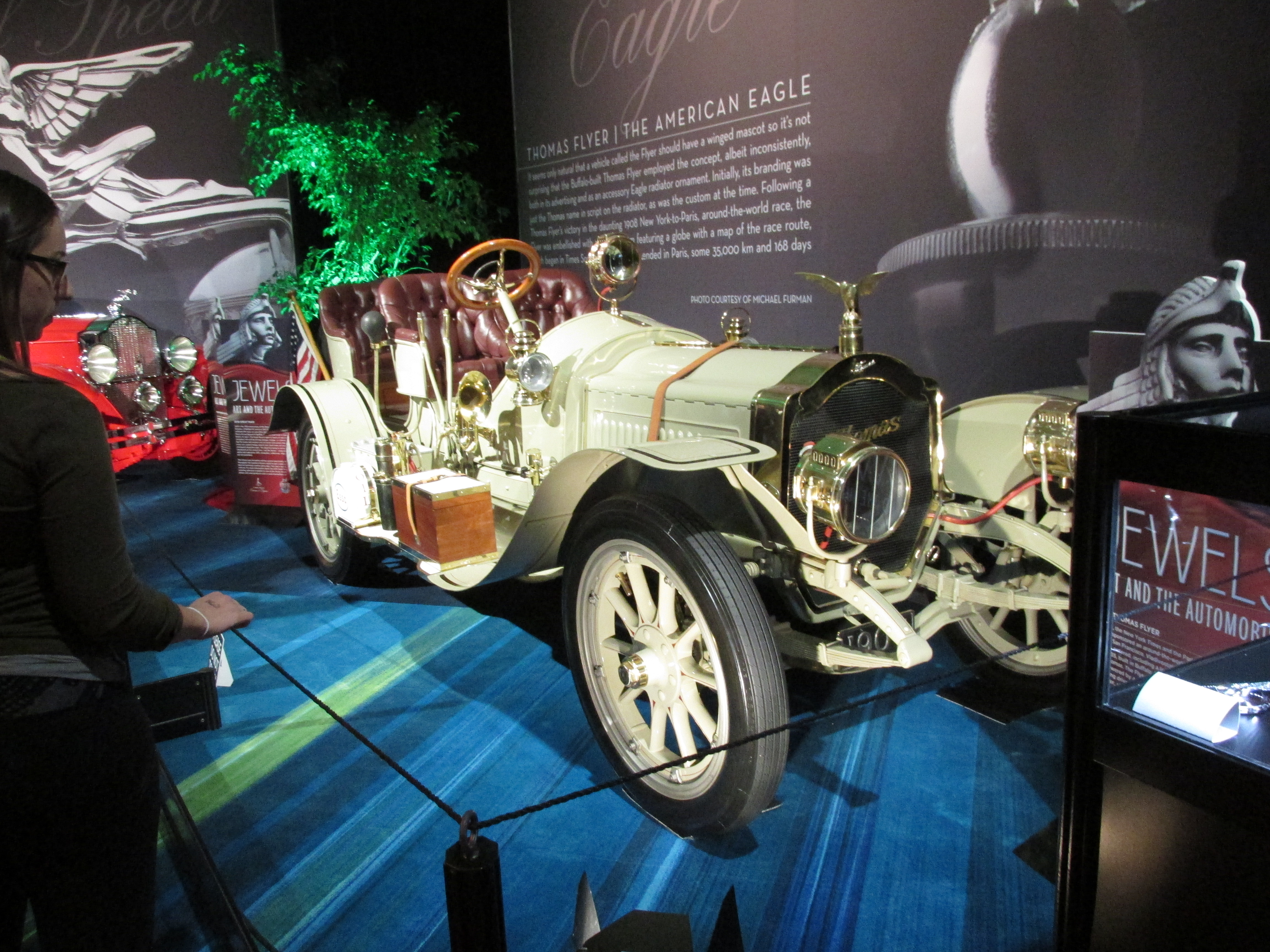
A 1907 Thomas Flyer on display in Toronto

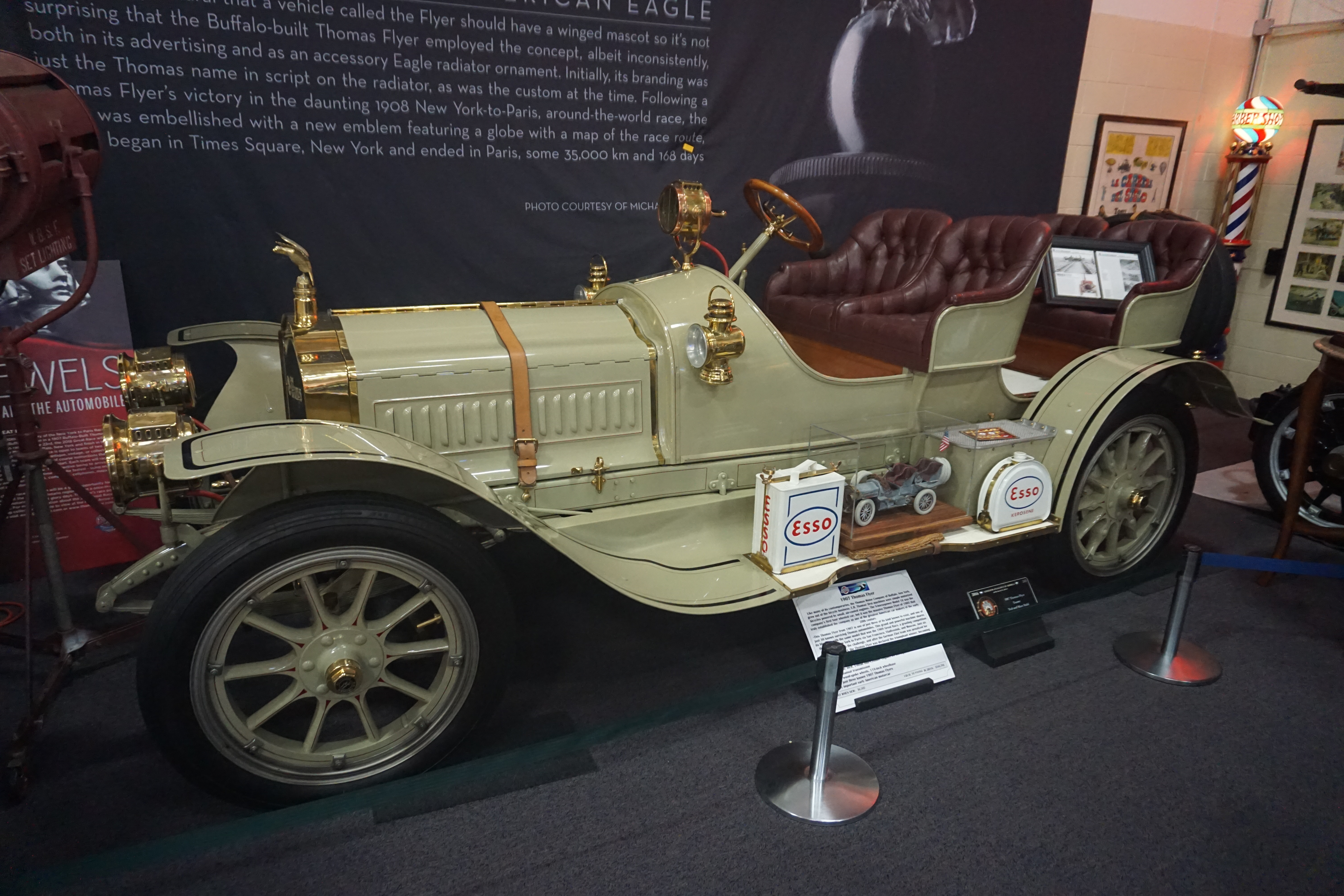
1907 Thomas Flyer at Stahls Automotive Collection

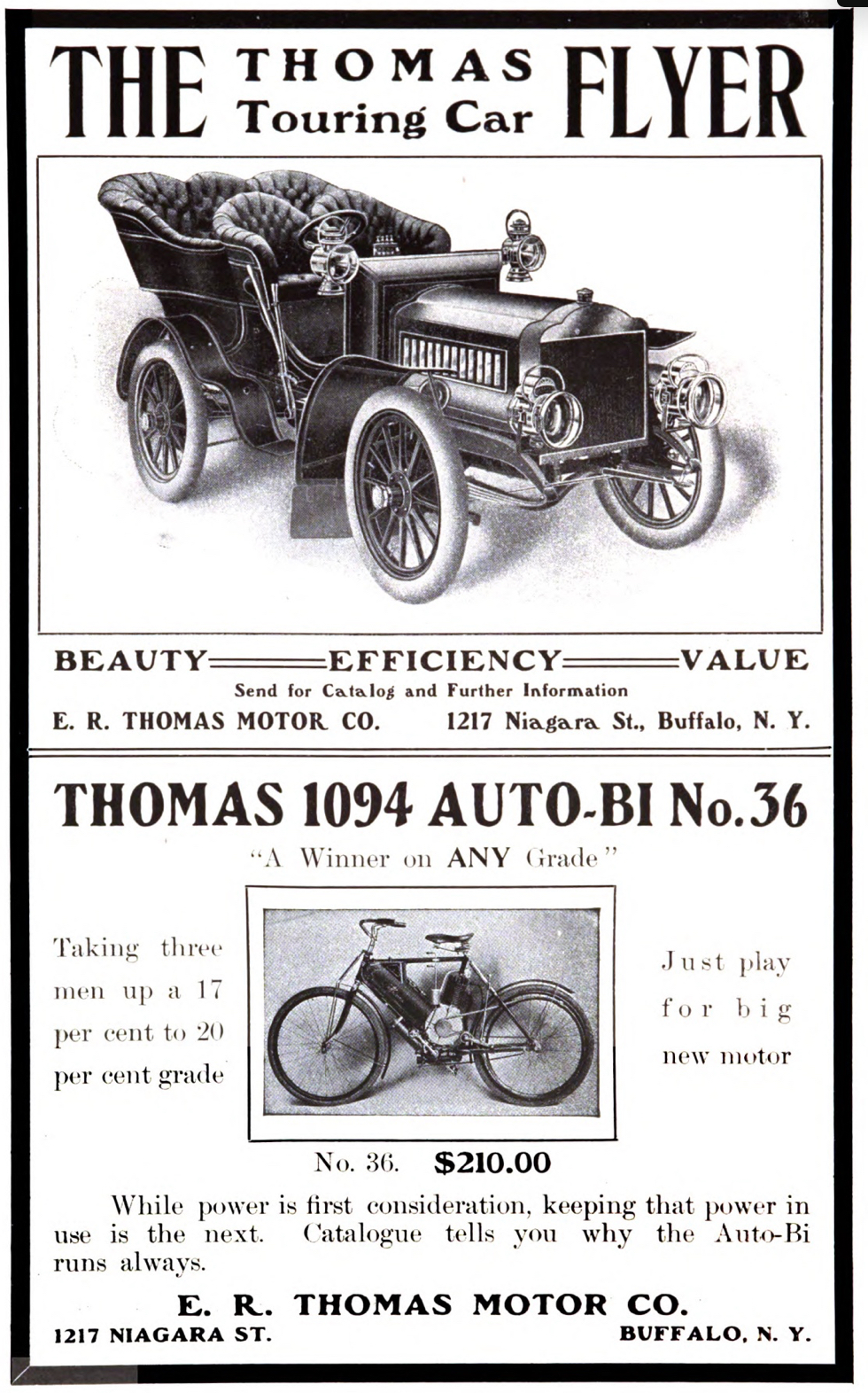
Thomas Flyer Model 22 (1904)

The E.R. Thomas Motor Company built automobiles from 1902 to 1919. The first Models were the 1902 Model 17, which was available in either a detachable rear entrance tonneau or runabout, equipped with a single cylinder 8hp and 2 speed planetary transmission. This was followed in January 1903 by the Model 18 with its sliding selective transmission and non-detachable tonneau with rear entrance or runabout body styles. Both the Model 17 and 18 sold side by side until stocks of the Model 17 were sold out in April-May 1903. The 1904 Thomas was the first Thomas to bear the "Flyer" name a touring car model and was the first multi cylinder vehicle produced by the firm. It was a 3 cylinder with planetary transmission on the earlier cars late change to the trans axle transmission that would continue for many years. Equipped with a tonneau, it could seat 5 passengers and sold for US$2500 ($89,583 in 2025 dollars). The vertically mounted water-cooled straight-3, situated at the front of the car, produced 24 hp (17.9 kW) from 4300 cc with a bore of 114.3 mm and a stroke of 139.7 mm. The steel-framed car weighed 1900 lb (862 kg). A modern cellular radiator was used for cooling. An 8 hp (6 kW) tonneau model sold for US$1250 ($44,792 in 2025 dollars). In 1912 the company went into receivership and was purchased by Empire Smelting & Refining Company owner C.A. Finnegan. E.R. Thomas was finally shut down between 1918 and 1919.

== Production models ==
- Thomas Model 17
- Thomas Model 18
- Thomas Flyer Model 22
- Thomas Model 25
- Thomas Model 26
- Thomas Model 27
- Thomas Model 29
- Thomas Model 30
- Thomas Model 31
- Thomas Model 32
- Thomas Model 33
- Thomas Model 34
- Thomas Model C-I
- Thomas Model C-II
- Thomas Model XXXVI
- Thomas Model XXXIX
- Thomas Model XL
- Thomas Model 4-40 Detroit
- Thomas Model 4-20 Town Car
- Thomas Model F 4-60 Touring Car
- Thomas Model K 6-70 Touring Car
- Thomas Model M 6-40 Touring Car
- Thomas Model 4-16 Town Car
- Thomas Model R 4-28 Town Car

== New York to Paris Race ==
A 1907 Model 35 with 4 cylinders and 60 horsepower, dubbed Thomas Flyer, won the 1908 New York to Paris Race, the first and only around-the-world automobile race ever held. The race began in Times Square, New York, on February 12 and covered some 22,000 miles (35,000 km), finishing in Paris on July 30, 1908. Six teams started the race (one Italian, one German, three French (De Dion-Bouton, Motobloc, and Sizaire-Naudin), and the American Flyer). Only three of the cars finished, the Thomas Flyer which won, the German Protos, and the Italian Züst. The original intent was to drive the full distance using the frozen Bering Strait to drive across the Pacific Ocean. In the course of the race, the Flyer was the first car to cross the United States taking 41 days 8 hours and 15 minutes, and the first to do so in the winter with George Schuster the first automobile driver to ever make the transcontinental winter crossing of the US. Finishing in 169 days was a remarkable feat, considering the lack of roads and services in 1908. Schuster, the driver, was the only member of the Thomas crew to go the full distance. The car was later used as a glider tow vehicle at a 1908 exhibition at the Morris Park Aerodrome in New York.

The Flyer survived and was restored to the exact condition it entered Paris on that day by William F. Harrah. It is now on exhibit at the National Automobile Museum in Reno, Nevada.

The Germans arrived in Paris on July 26, 1908. The American Flyer arrived at the edge of the city on July 30, and initially was not allowed into Paris by police because it had a broken headlamp. A passerby offered the team a bicycle light. With no tools to remove the light, they simply strapped the bike on the Thomas Flyer so they could enter Paris and finish the race. It was later discovered the Protos took some shortcuts on its path and was penalized, so the American team that actually arrived second was declared the official winner of the epic race.

The 1965 Warner Brothers movie The Great Race is inspired by the 1908 New York to Paris race and the hero's car, the Leslie Special, is documented to be inspired by the Thomas flyer.

== See also ==
- Brass Era car
- List of defunct United States automobile manufacturers
- Charles T. Hinde
