= Hans Koeppen =

Hans Friedrich Wilhelm Hugo Koeppen
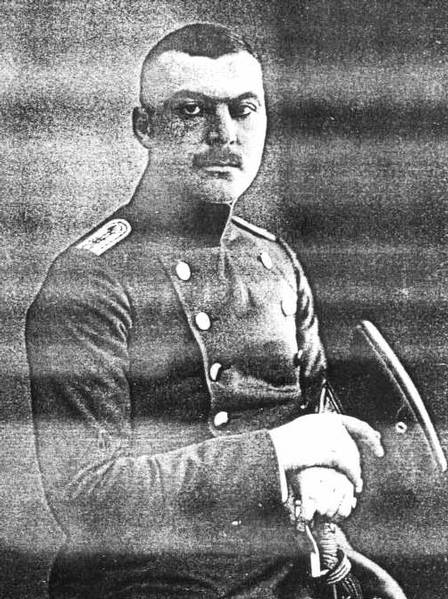
- Born: July 31, 1876; Minden, Kingdom of Prussia
- Died: July 10, 1948 (aged 71); Berlin, Germany
- Occupation: Army Officer

Hans Friedrich Wilhelm Hugo Koeppen (July 31, 1876, in Minden – July 10, 1948, in Berlin) was an officer in the Prussian army, the German Reichswehr, and a participant in the first car race around the world.

== Military career ==
He joined the 2nd Westphalian Infantry Regiment, and in 1894 was promoted to second lieutenant. He rose through the ranks and became a full colonel in October 1939, and major general in April 1944, shortly before retiring.

== Participation in The ‘Great Race’ ==
As a lieutenant he took part in the first touring car rally around the world: the 1908 New York to Paris Race. Koeppen had never driven before. Koeppen's car, the Protos Wettfahrtwagen, was the first to arrive in Paris, beating the next competitor by four days. However he was penalized because he had used a rail-car for part of the journey and skipped Alaska, and thus lost first place. In 1909, his book about the race, Im Auto um die Welt ("The World by Car") was published and it made him a celebrity, or folk hero, in Germany. His fame helped to popularise the toothbrush moustache in Germany, the same style later adopted by Adolf Hitler.

== Gallery ==
Hans Koeppen
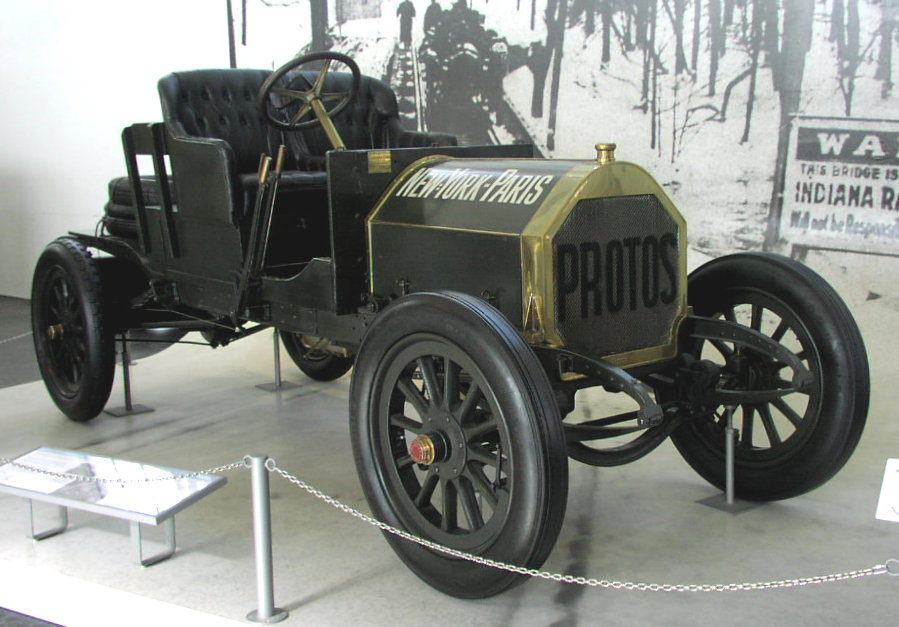
The Protos race car. Deutsches Museum, Munich

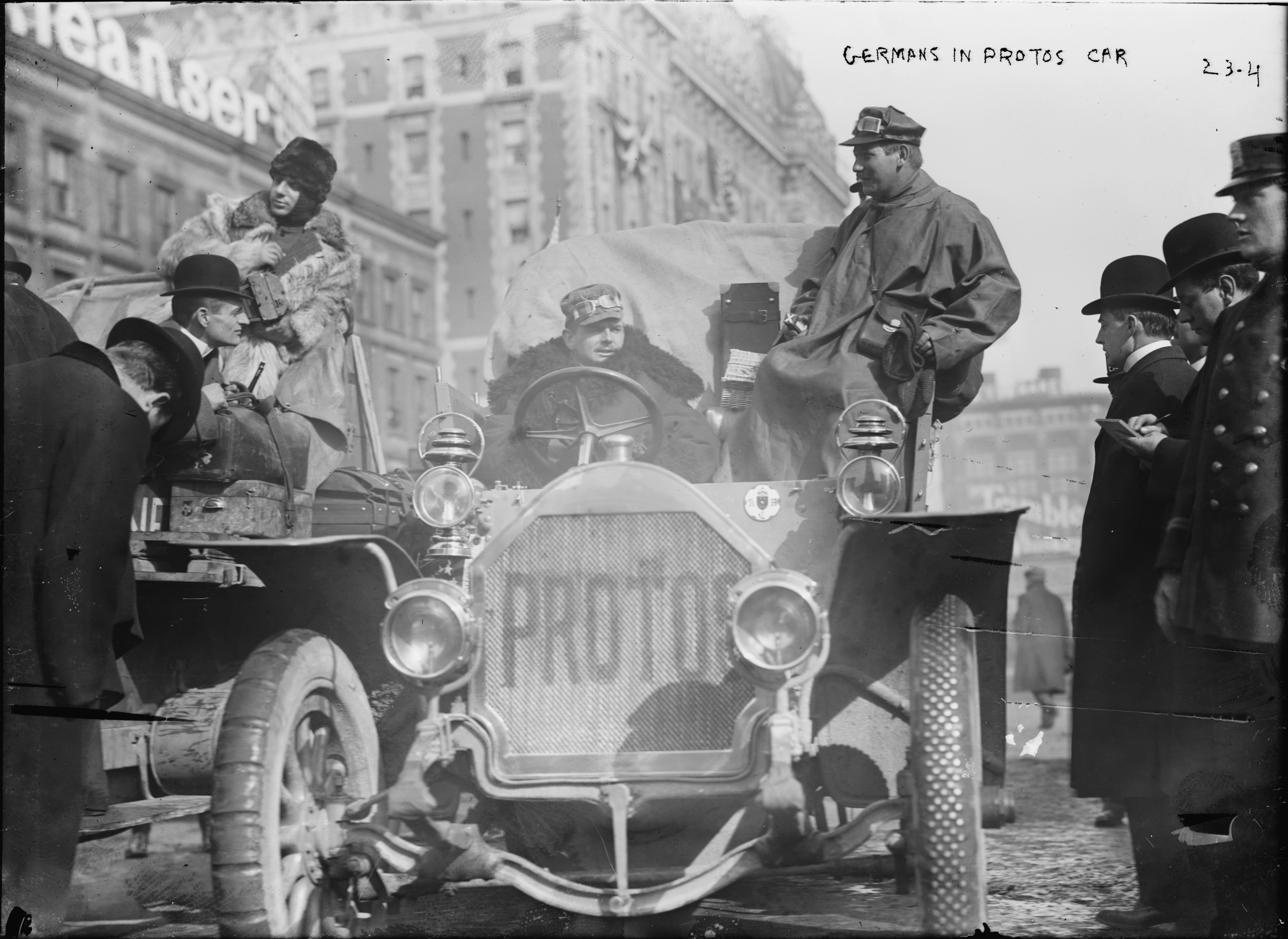
Grid before the 1908 New York to Paris Race
