= Protos of Nonnendamm =

Defunct German car manufacturer

Protos
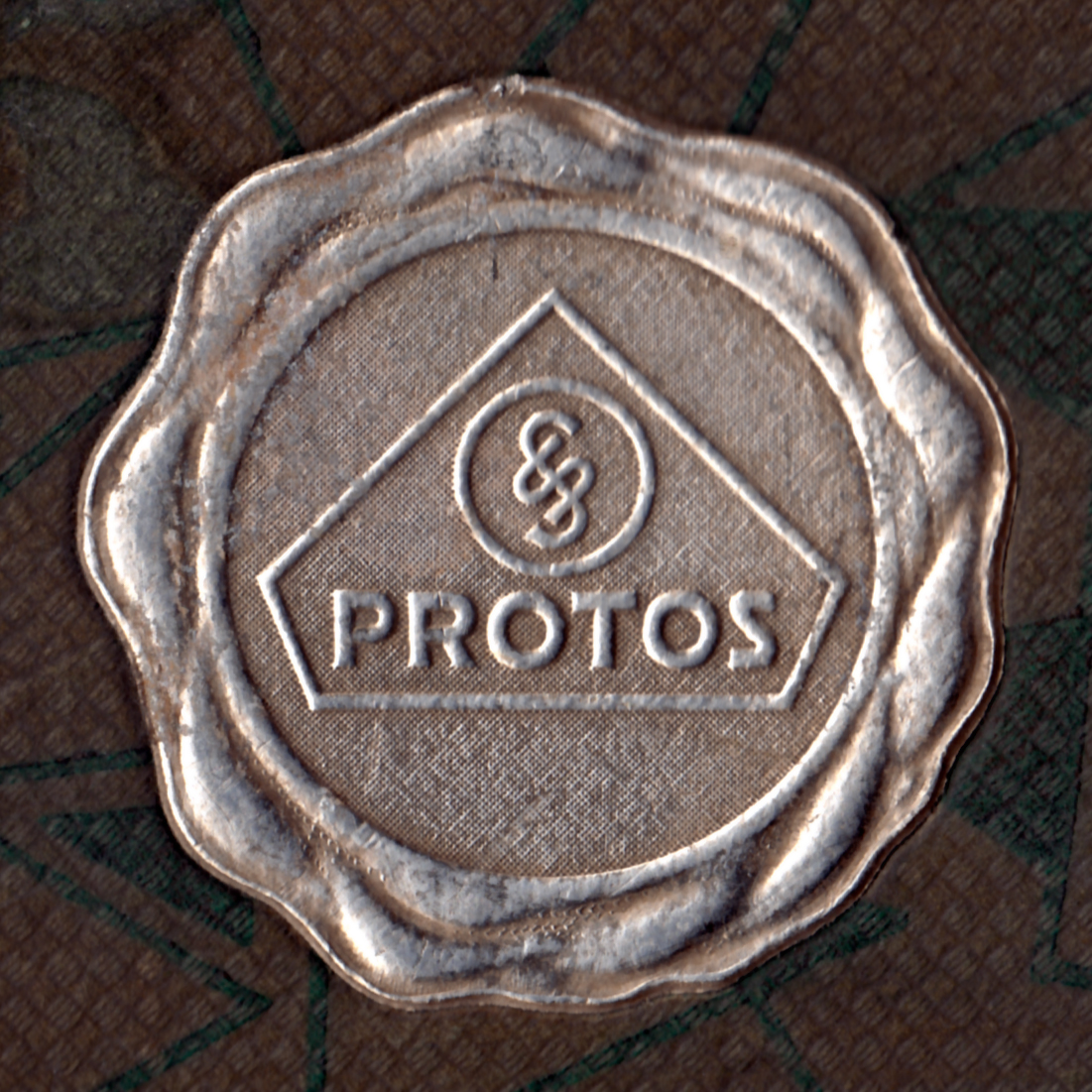
- Founded: 1898; 128 years ago
- Defunct: 1926; 100 years ago
- Headquarters: Berlin, Germany

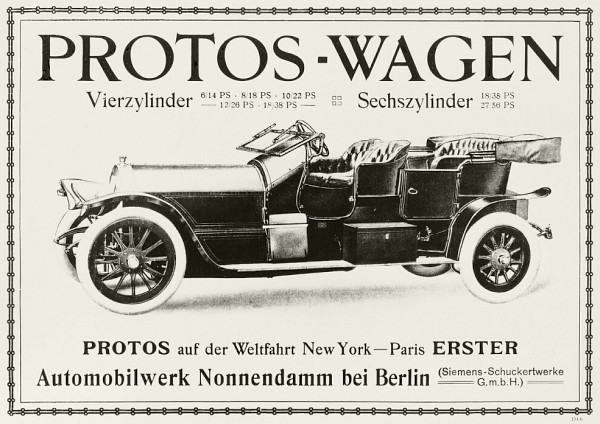
Typ E1 advert in 1908

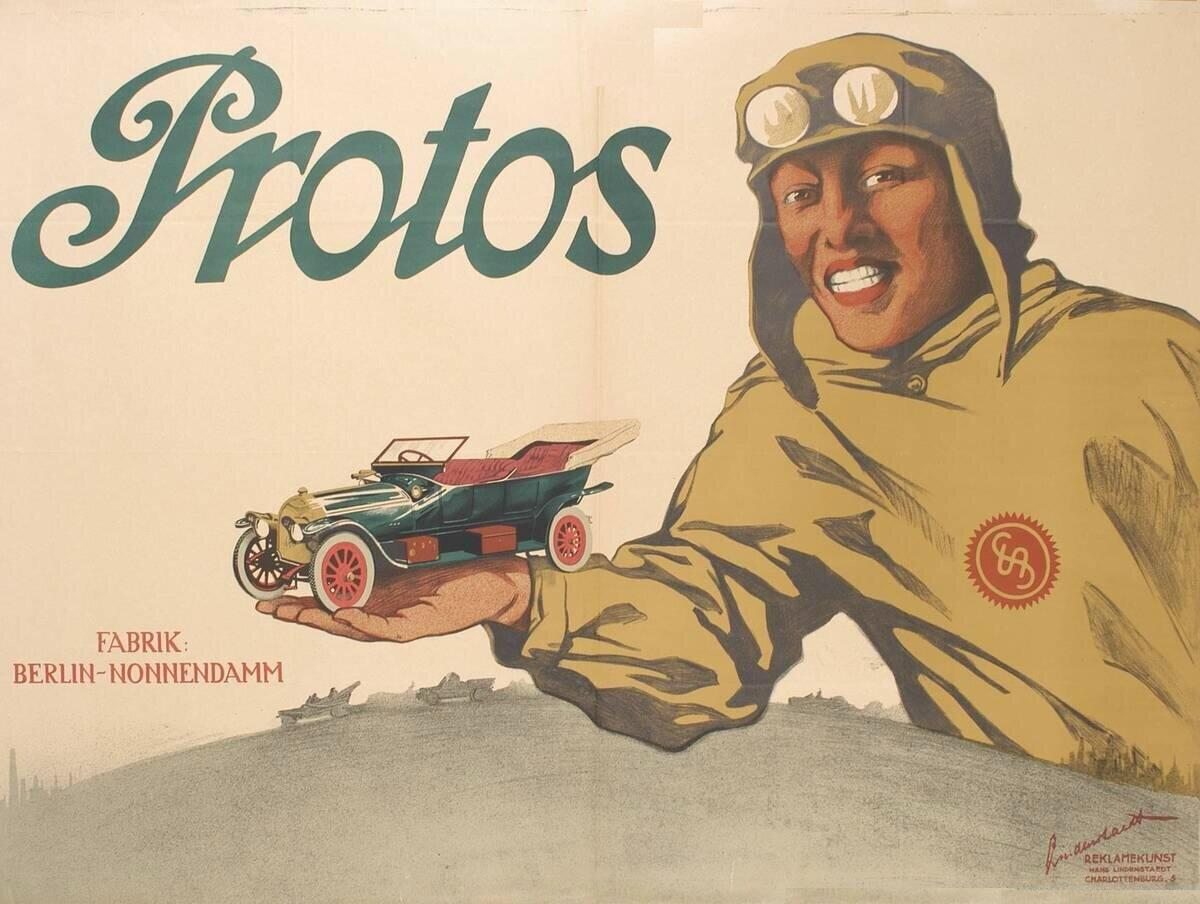
Poster by Hans Lindenstaedt (1874-1928)

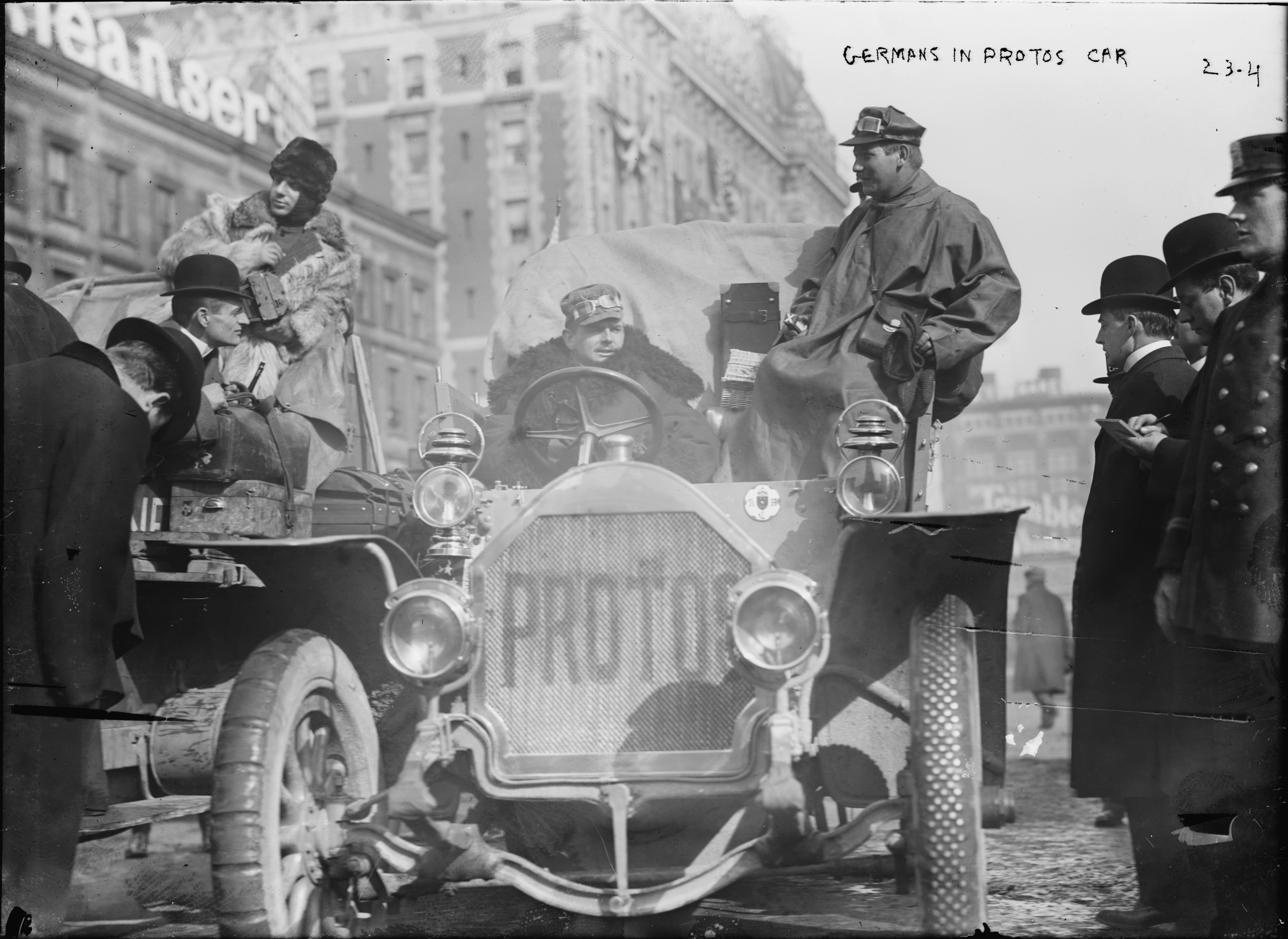
Protos convertible at start of 1908 New York to Paris Race

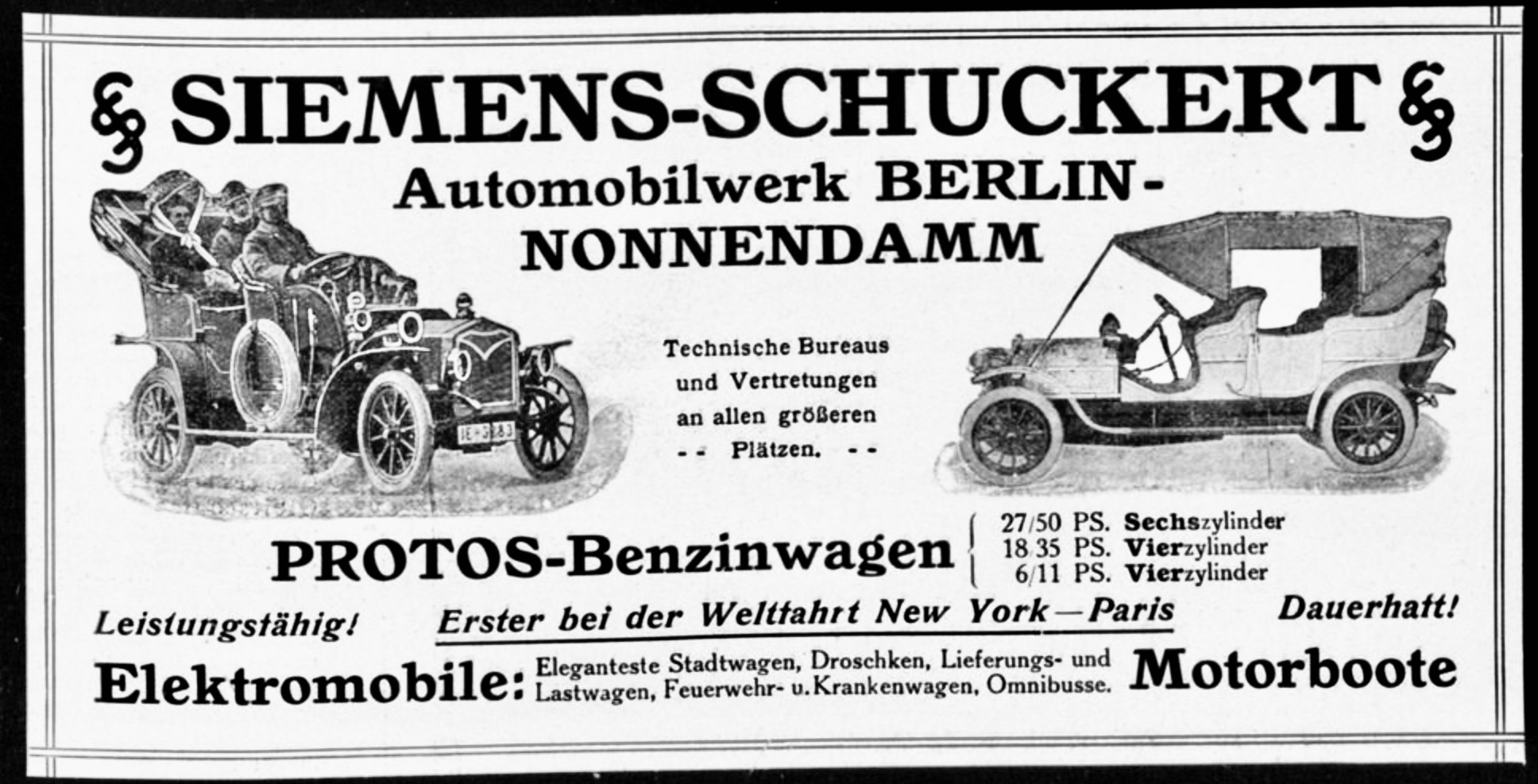
Protos (1909)

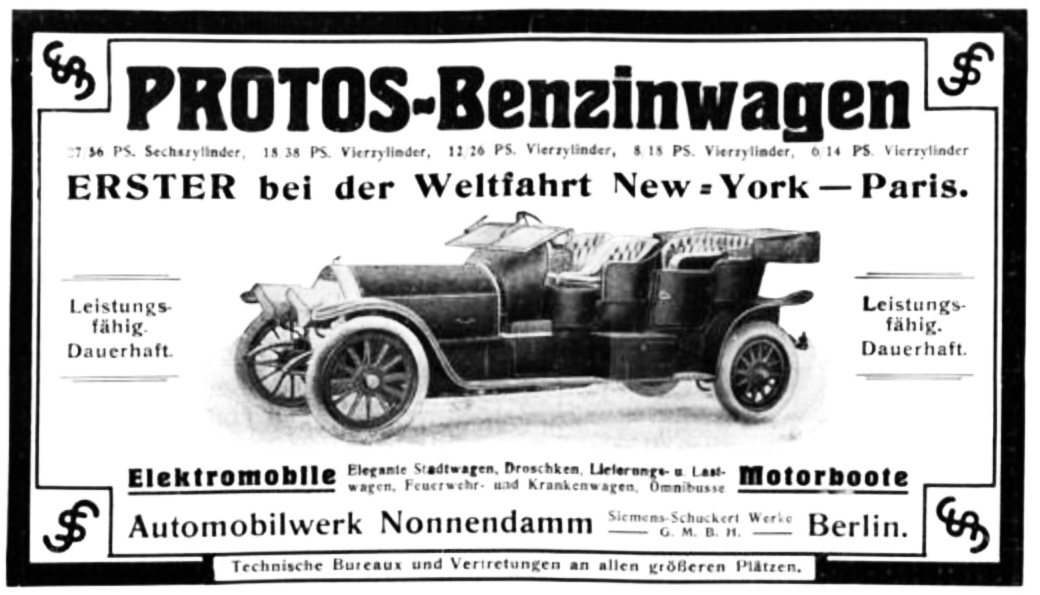
Protos advertisement (1910)

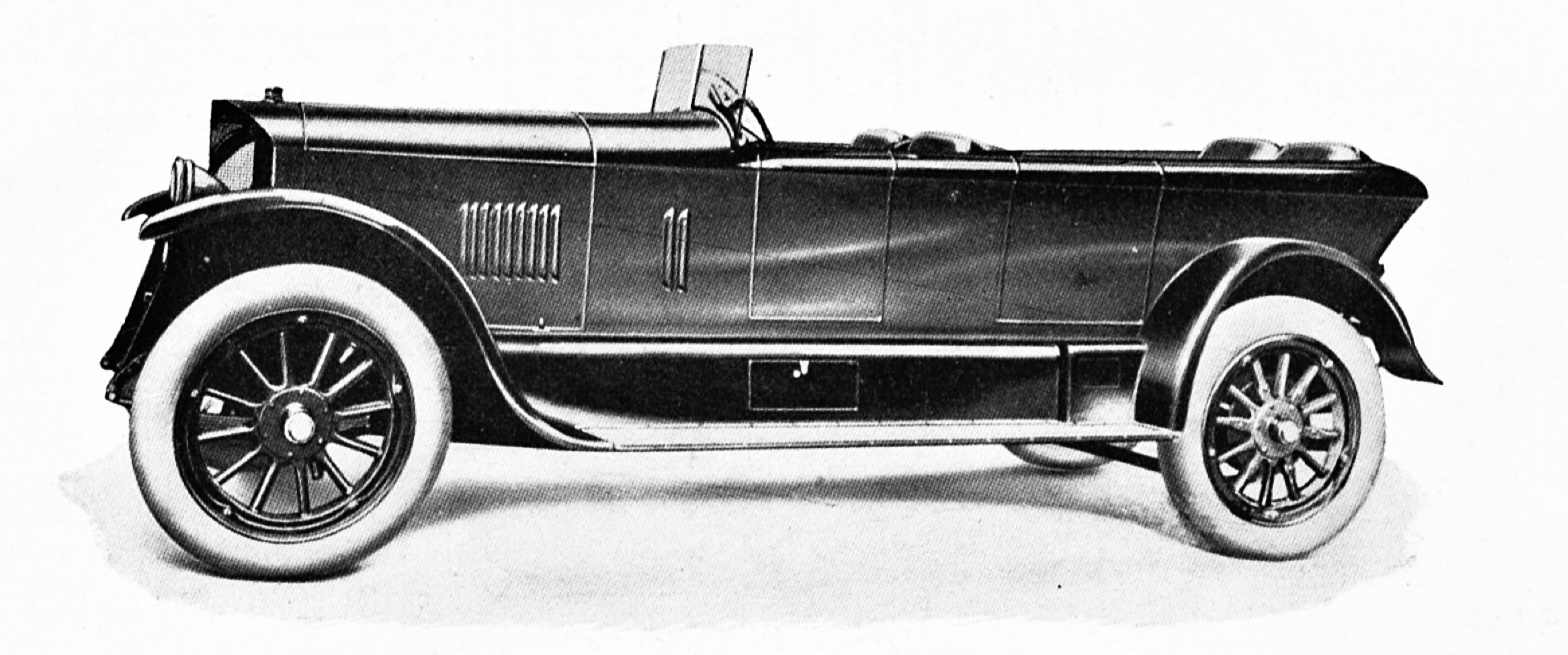
Protos Typ C six passengers (1918-1924)

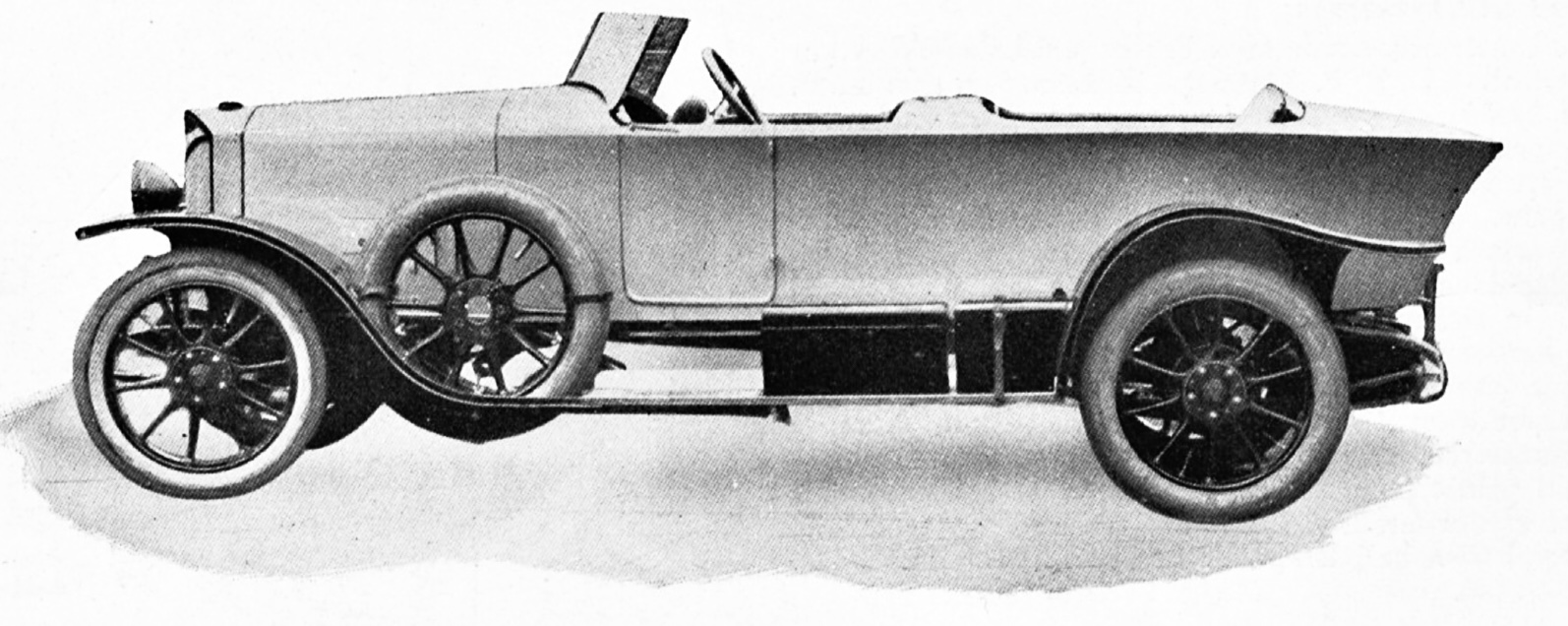
Protos Typ C four passengers (1918-1924)

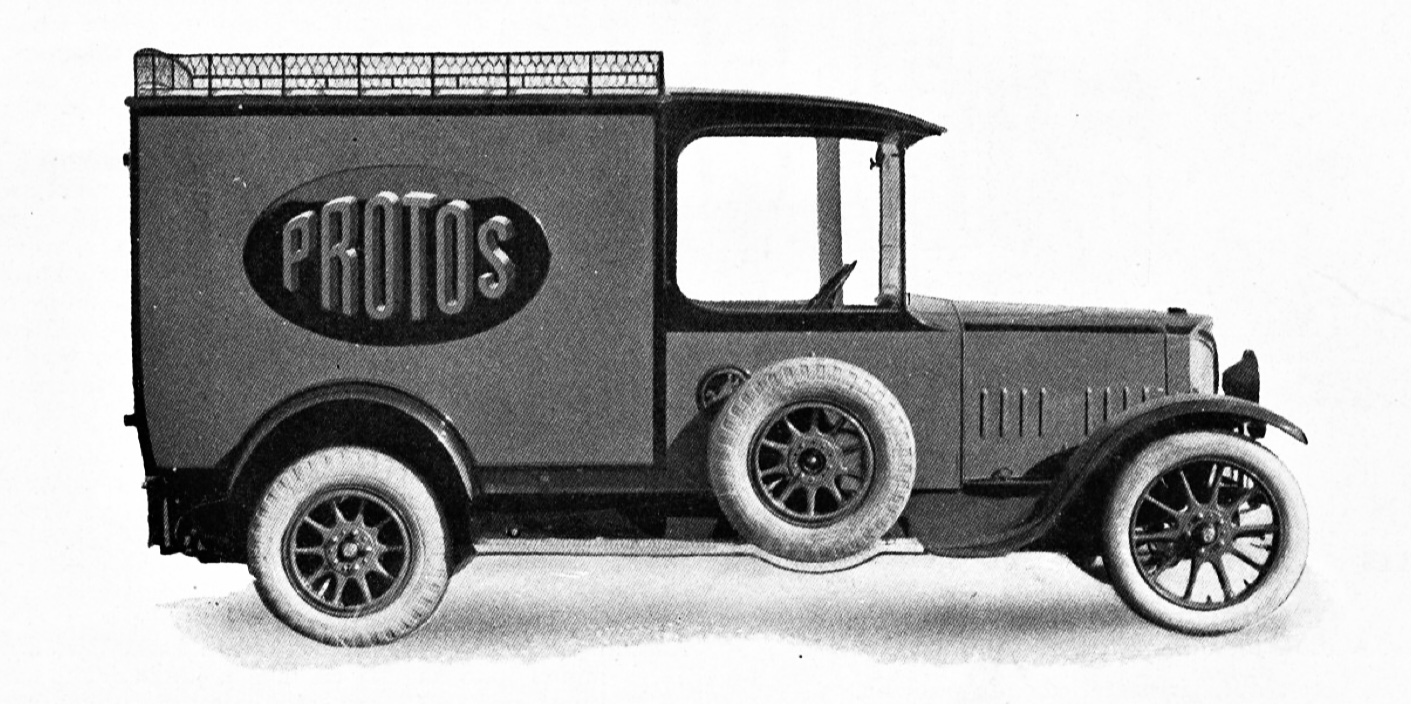
Protos Typ C delivery van 1t (1918-1924)

Protos of Nonnendamm was a German car manufacturing company founded in 1898 in Berlin by engineers Alfred Sternberg and Oscar Heymann.

== History ==
Sternberg initially manufactured a series of small motors, 2.5 hp single-cylinder air-cooled, and others water-cooled of 3.5 hp. In 1905 he began producing Protos automobiles, developing the new 'Kompensmotor' or compensated motor, giving a smooth, fast ride. To dampen engine vibrations, Sternberg designed a motor with two cylinders and a third piston set at 180 degrees from the other two and having no other function than to act as a counterbalance to the two working pistons. This revolutionary design worked well and was much quieter than other twin engines in the country, providing up to 14 hp and remaining in production for several years.

Protos' six-cylinder vehicle found many buyers, including Crown Prince Wilhelm II, and his brother Prince Heinrich of Prussia who invented and patented the first windscreen wipers for cars in 1908. Crown Prince Wilhelm II's stable of cars consisted entirely of Protos so that the firm could advertise in 1911 "The German Crown Prince, a sportsman and automobile expert, drives only Protos vehicles."

In 1906 the headquarters were moved from Großgörschenstraße 39, Schöneberg, to Berlin-Reinickendorf. The Protos gained worldwide acclaim in 1908 when it was first to cross the finishing line in the 1908 New York to Paris Race organised by the newspapers Le Matin of Paris, and The New York Times - six competitors covered some 13 000 miles, an additional 10 000 miles being over sea. In 1910, having run into financial difficulties, the company was bought by the Siemens-Schuckert-Werke and Ernst Valentin, and moved to the Nonnendamm address, whence the name Protos Automobilwerk Nonnendamm GmbH. In 1911 the company name was changed to Protos Automobil GmbH.

Protos also developed electric vehicles, some of which were produced by Bergmann Elektrizitätswerke in Berlin-Wilhelmsruh. In 1926 the company was sold to AEG, and Protos merged with NAG (Nationale Automobil Gesellschaft), a subsidiary of AEG). The resulting company NAG-Protos AG was dissolved a year later in 1927, the company in its 22-year existence having produced over 25 000 vehicles.

Around 1908 on the Nonnendamm, in what is now Berlin, Protos built electric LKW (trucks) for municipal use. These were driven by motors located on the rear wheels. In addition to the normal steering wheel they had two additional steering wheels located on the left and the right outside, which could be operated by the driver while walking beside the vehicle. This utility E-LKW was also supplied by Protos as a normal truck of four-ton payload and as an omnibus. The chassis were built by Siemens-Schuckertwerke and the motors by Siemens & Halske. In 1911 commercial electric vehicles were introduced. In addition to automobiles and vans, truck and coach models were produced from 1913 with 2.5 t capacity and up to 30 hp. During the First World War many trucks came with 40 hp and a 3 t payload. In addition a model was built with 50 hp and 4.5 t payload. After the War production was limited to passenger cars and vans, but trucks that had been stockpiled were still available until the 1920s.

== Models from 1905 to 1927 ==
Protos was a car manufacturer with a very high reputation for reliability, due in part to its car participating in the 1908 New York to Paris Race.

Type	Construction period	Cylinders	Displacement	Power	Vmax
17/35 hp	1905–1908	4	4560 cm³	35 hp (25,7 kW)	85 km/h
Typ E1 (18/42 hp)	1906–1914	4	4560 cm³	44 hp (32,3 kW)	90 km/h
6/10 hp	1908	4	1596 cm³	11 hp (8,1 kW)	60 km/h
Typ G (6/12 hp)	1908	4	1502 cm³	12 hp (8,8 kW)	55 km/h
26/50 hp	1908–1914	6	6840 cm³	55 hp (40 kW)	100 km/h
Typ E2 (27/65 hp)	1908–1914	6	6840 cm³	65 hp (48 kW)	115 km/h
Typ F (18/45 hp)	1910–1912	6	4578 cm³	48 hp (35,3 kW)	100 km/h
Typ G1 (6/18 hp)	1910–1914	4	1570 cm³	18 hp (13,2 kW)	60 km/h
Typ C · (10/30 hp)	1918–1924	4	2614 cm³	30 hp (22 kW)	75 km/h
Typ C1 (10/45 hp)	1924–1927	4	2614 cm³	45 hp (33 kW)	85 km/h
