= George Schuster (driver) =

American racing driver

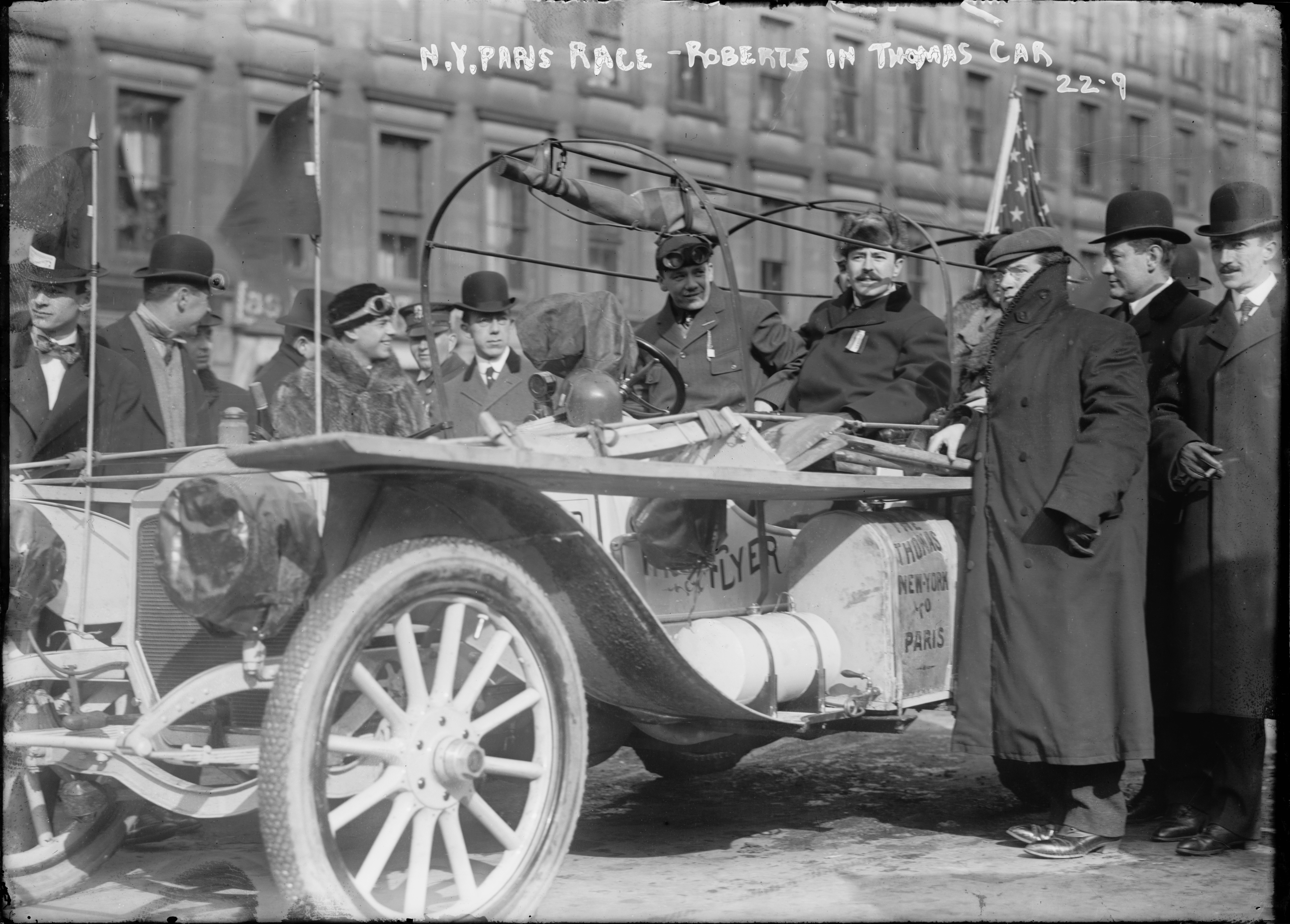
The Thomas Flyer

George N. Schuster (1873–1972) was the driver of the American built Thomas Flyer and winner of the 1908 New York to Paris Race.

The "Great Race" was an international competition among teams representing Germany (Protos), Italy (Brixia-Zust), France (three teams: DeDion-Bouton, Moto Bloc, Sizaire-Naudin) and the United States (Thomas Flyer). Schuster's victory for the American entry still stands nearly a century later. Schuster was also the first person to drive across the United States during the winter in an automobile.

The 22,000 mile course (13,341 miles driven) started February 12, 1908, in Times Square with a crowd of 250,000 watching the start of what would become a 169-day ordeal. The Race began in mid-winter at a time when there were no snowplows, few roads on the around the world route, unreliable maps, and often little food for the competitors. The original plan was to drive the cars the full distance from New York City to Paris using the frozen Bering Straits to "bridge" the Pacific. This proved impossible, requiring the competitors to cross the Pacific by ship. The Flyer arrived in Paris July 30, 1908, to win although the German Protos had actually arrived there four days before; race officials decided to penalize the Germans for having shipped their car via rail for part of the route rather than it having traveled the entire land portion of the route under its own power as the organizers had envisioned. Of the six teams that started the race, only three finished in Paris; the German Protos, the Italian Briax-Zust, and the American Thomas Flyer; the French Sizaire team had never made it out of New York State.

Schuster was chosen to be part of the Thomas Race Team due to his proven mechanical abilities, which were put to daily use during the Race. Schuster was the only American team member aboard the Flyer from its start in New York City to the finish in Paris.

Schuster's start in the automotive industry had been building tubular radiators in October 1902 for the E.R. Thomas Motor Company at the Buffalo, New York, factory. From there he quickly progressed to become the troubleshooter for Thomas, in charge of final vehicle assembly and often delivering Thomas cars to their new owners. In the early 1900s, first-time auto owners or their chauffeurs were taught by factory or dealer representatives not only how to care for their new machines but often also how to drive them.

Schuster was inducted into the Automotive Hall of Fame on October 12, 2010.

== Sources ==
- The Great Auto Race
