= The Great Race =

1965 film by Blake Edwards

- Theatrical release poster
- Directed by: Blake Edwards
- Screenplay by: Arthur A. Ross
- Story by: Blake Edwards; Arthur A. Ross
- Produced by: Martin Jurow
- Starring: Jack Lemmon; Tony Curtis; Natalie Wood; Peter Falk; Keenan Wynn; Arthur O'Connell; Vivian Vance; Dorothy Provine; Larry Storch; Ross Martin
- Cinematography: Russell Harlan
- Edited by: Ralph E. Winters
- Music by: Henry Mancini
- Production companies: Jalem Productions; Reynard Productions; Patricia Productions
- Distributed by: Warner Bros. Pictures
- Release date: July 1, 1965
- Running time: 160 minutes
- Country: United States
- Language: English
- Budget: US$12 million
- Box office: US$25,333,333

The Great Race is a 1965 American Technicolor epic slapstick comedy film directed by Blake Edwards, starring Jack Lemmon, Tony Curtis, and Natalie Wood, written by Arthur A. Ross (from a story by Edwards and Ross) and with music by Henry Mancini and cinematography by Russell Harlan. The supporting cast includes Peter Falk, Keenan Wynn, Arthur O'Connell, and Vivian Vance.

The movie cost US$12 million (equivalent to $92 million in 2024), making it the most expensive comedy film at the time. The story was inspired by the actual 1908 New York to Paris Race. It was co-produced by Lemmon's Jalem Productions, Curtis' Reynard Productions, and Edwards' Patricia Productions.

It is known for one scene that was promoted as "the greatest pie fight ever". It was nominated for five Academy Awards, winning the Academy Award for Best Sound Effects.

== Plot ==
Leslie "The Great Leslie" Gallant III and Professor Fate are competing daredevils at the turn of the 20th century. Leslie is an archetypically handsome, kind, skillful. and successful hero always dressed in white, often with an American Flag motif when performing. Fate is a stereotypical villain, usually dressed in black, sporting a black moustache and top hat, prone to maniacal laughter, and bent on outdoing Leslie, only to be dogged by failure each time. Leslie proposes an automobile race from New York City to Paris and offers the Webber Motor Car Company the opportunity to build an automobile to make the journey. They design and build a new car for him, "The Leslie Special". Fate builds his own car, "The Hannibal Twin-8", complete with hidden devices of sabotage. Other car owners enter the race, including one owned by New York's most prominent newspaper. Driving the newspaper's car is photojournalist Maggie DuBois, a vocal suffragist.

A seven-car race begins, but Fate's sidekick Maximilian "Mean Max" Meen has sabotaged four other cars, plus his own by mistake, leaving just three cars in the race. The surviving teams are Leslie with his loyal valet Hezekiah Sturdy, Maggie driving a Stanley Steamer by herself, and Fate and Max. The steamer car breaks down, and Maggie accepts a lift in the Leslie Special. Fate arrives first at a refueling point, the small Western frontier town of Boracho. "Texas Jack", a local outlaw, becomes jealous of showgirl Lily Olay's flirting with Leslie, and a saloon brawl ensues. Fate sneaks outside amid the chaos, steals the fuel he needs, and destroys the rest. Leslie uses mules to pull his car to another refueling point, where Maggie tricks Hezekiah into boarding a train and handcuffs him to a seat, lying to Leslie that Hezekiah had quit and "wanted to go back to New York".

The two remaining cars reach the Bering Strait and park side by side in a blinding snowstorm. Keeping warm during the storm, Leslie and Maggie begin to see each other as more than competitors. Mishaps, including a polar bear in Fate's car, compel all four racers to warm themselves in Leslie's car. They awaken on a small ice floe, which drifts into their intended Russian port, where Hezekiah is waiting for Leslie, who casts off Maggie for deceiving him. Maggie is snatched by Fate, who drives off in the lead.

After driving across Asia, both cars enter the tiny kingdom of Carpania, whose alcoholic Crown Prince Friedrich Hapnick is the spitting image of Professor Fate. Plotters under the leadership of Baron Rolfe von Stuppe and General Kuhster kidnap the Prince, Fate, Max, and Maggie. Max escapes and joins Leslie to rescue the others. Fate is forced to masquerade as the prince during the coronation so that the rebels can gain control of the kingdom. Leslie and Max overcome Von Stuppe's henchmen and confront Von Stuppe. Following a sword fight with Leslie, Von Stuppe attempts escape by leaping to a waiting boat but bursts the hull and sinks it. Leslie and Max return the real prince to the capital in time to defeat Kuhster's plan for a military coup. Fate, still masquerading as Prince Hapnick, takes refuge in a bakery, but falls into a huge cake. A huge pie fight ensues involving the racers, the prince's men, and the conspirators. The five racers, covered in pie filling, depart Carpania with King Friedrich's best wishes.

As the racers leave Pottsdorf (with Maggie now back in Leslie's car), it becomes a straight road race to Paris. Nearing Paris, Leslie and Maggie have an argument regarding the roles of men, women, and sex in relationships. Leslie stops his car just short of the finish line under the Eiffel Tower to prove that he loves Maggie more than he cares about winning the race. Fate drives past to claim the winner's mantle, but becomes indignant that Leslie let him win. Fate refuses to accept the winner's mantle and demands a rematch, a west-to-east race back to New York City.

The return race commences, with newlyweds Leslie and Maggie now a team. Fate lets them start first, then orders Max to destroy their car with a cannon. The shot misses the Leslie Special and instead brings the Eiffel Tower down on Fate and Max.

== Cast ==
- Jack Lemmon as Professor Fate / Prince Friedrich Hapnick
- Tony Curtis as Leslie "The Great Leslie" Gallant III
- Natalie Wood as Maggie DuBois
- Peter Falk as Maximillian "Mean Max" Meen
- Keenan Wynn as Hezekiah Sturdy
- Arthur O'Connell as Henry Goodbody
- Vivian Vance as Hester Goodbody
- Dorothy Provine as Lily Olay
- Larry Storch as Jack "Texas Jack"
- Ross Martin as Baron Rolf Von Stuppe
- Hal Smith as The Mayor of Boracho
- Denver Pyle as The Sheriff of Boracho
- Marvin Kaplan as Frisbee
- George Macready as General Kuhster
- Joyce Nizzari as Woman in West
- William Bryant as Baron's Guard
- Ken Wales as Baron's Guard

== Themes ==
Director Blake Edwards based the film on the 1908 New York to Paris Race, very loosely interpreted. On February 12, 1908, the "Greatest Auto Race" began with six entrants, starting in New York City and racing westward across three continents. The destination was Paris, making it the first around-the-world automobile race. Only the approximate race route and the general time period were borrowed by Edwards in his effort to make "the funniest comedy ever".

Edwards, a studious admirer of silent film, dedicated the film to film comedians Laurel and Hardy. The Great Race incorporated a great many silent-era visual gags, along with slapstick, double entendres, parodies, and absurdities. The film includes such time-worn scenes as a barroom brawl, the tent of the desert sheik, a sword fight, and the laboratory of the mad scientist. The unintended consequences of Professor Fate (Jack Lemmon)'s order, "Push the button, Max!" to his henchman Maximillian Mean (Peter Falk) is a running gag, along with the spotless invulnerability of the Great Leslie (Tony Curtis).

Edwards poked fun at later films and literature, as well. The saloon brawl scene was a parody of the Western film genre and a plot detour launched during the final third of the film was a direct parody of the Anthony Hope novel The Prisoner of Zenda and of the 1937 film version of the story, where a traveler is a lookalike for the king and stands in for him.

== Production ==
Because of the success of Edwards' previous films Breakfast at Tiffany's, The Pink Panther, and A Shot in the Dark, the film's budget started at $6 million. Mirisch Productions initially financed the film for United Artists. The film's escalating costs led UA to drop the film, but the project was picked up by Warner Bros. Pictures.

Edwards wanted Robert Wagner to play the leading man, but studio executive Jack L. Warner insisted on Curtis, possibly because of Natalie Wood's recent divorce from Wagner. (Burt Lancaster was announced at one stage.) Working with Warner, Curtis's new agent Irving "Swifty" Lazar negotiated US$125,000 for Curtis—more than Edwards and Lemmon, who were to receive US$100,000 each. After Warner signed the Curtis contract, Lazar reasoned that Edwards and Lemmon should make US$125,000 and Warner upped its compensation to match Curtis.

Julie Andrews was first approached for the role of Maggie DuBois. Andrews, having admired the work of Edwards, wanted to work on the film, but was forced to bow out due to delays on The Sound of Music. Andrews eventually married Edwards and acted in several of his films afterward. Natalie Wood did not want to make The Great Race, but Warner talked her into it. Wood was unhappy with her career and her personal life, having been divorced from Robert Wagner in April 1962. Warner asked Curtis if he would give a percentage of his film royalties to Wood as an enticement, but Curtis refused. He said, "I couldn't give her anything to make her want to do the movie." Instead of more money, Warner promised Wood that if she completed The Great Race, she could star in Gavin Lambert's drama Inside Daisy Clover, a role she greatly wished to have. Wood agreed, thinking that filming would be brief on Edwards' movie.

Shooting began on June 15, 1964. Many of the sight gags for The Great Race were expensive to create and the costs ballooned to US$12 million by the time the film was finished. Edwards, sometimes with Wood in tow, repeatedly visited Warner in his office to ask for more money. Warner approved nearly all of the requests. When it was released, it was the most expensive comedy ever filmed.

Shooting ended in November 1964. During the five months of filming, Wood's unhappiness was not visible to the cast and crew and her characterization of Maggie DuBois was playful. Her sister Lana Wood thought that Wood looked the prettiest she ever had, but sensed that the film "was physically taxing" for Wood. On Friday, November 27, the day after Thanksgiving, Wood wrapped the last bit of dialog work, then went home and swallowed a bottle of prescription pills. Groggy from the drugs, she called her friend Mart Crowley, who took her to the hospital for emergency treatment.

Music for the film was by Henry Mancini and the costumes were designed by Edith Head. Production design, setting the period and augmenting the visual humor, was by Fernando Carrere, who had designed The Great Escape and The Pink Panther for Blake Edwards. The unique slideshow-style title design was by Ken Mundie.

=== Custom cars ===
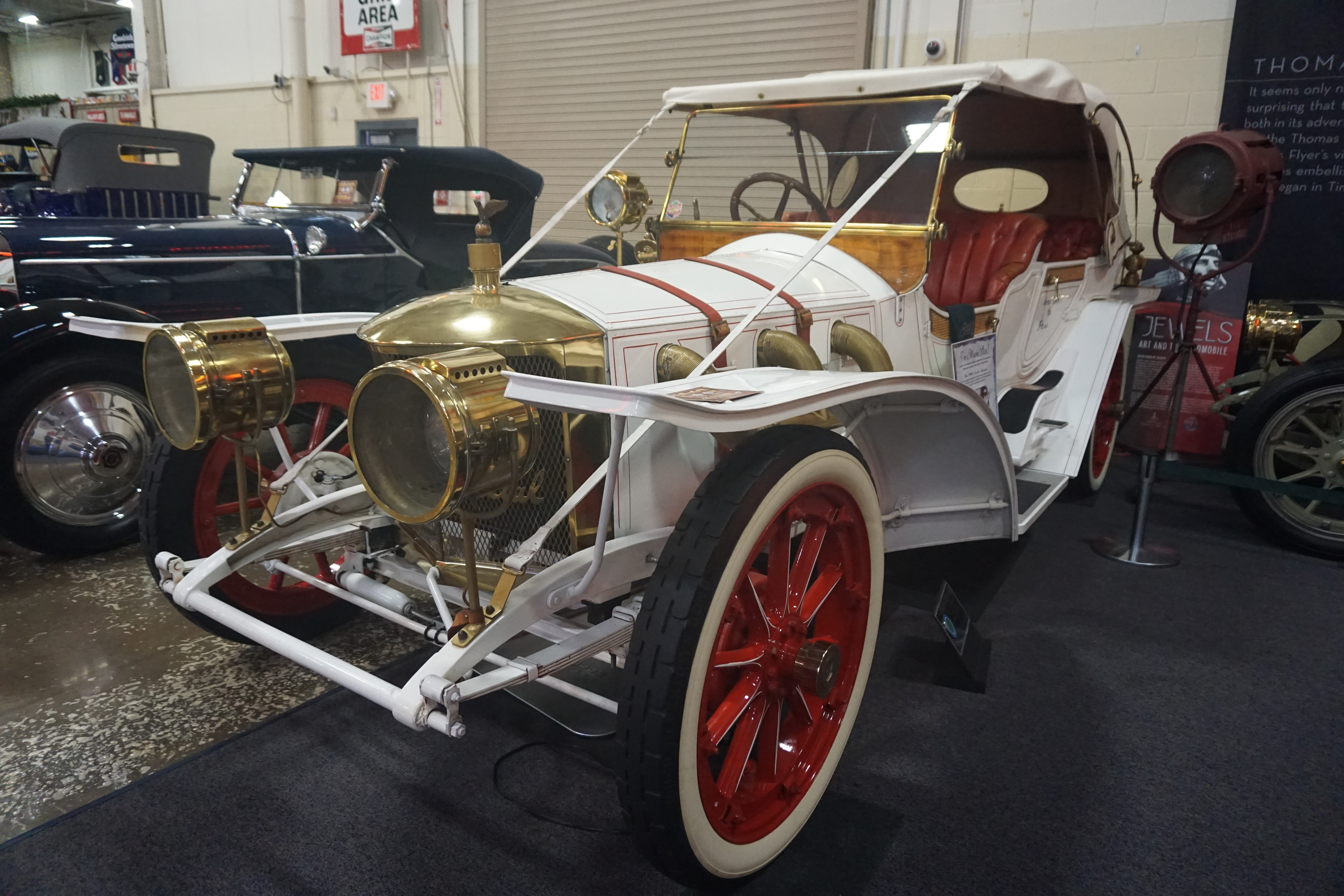
Leslie Special from The Great Race at Stahls Automotive Collection

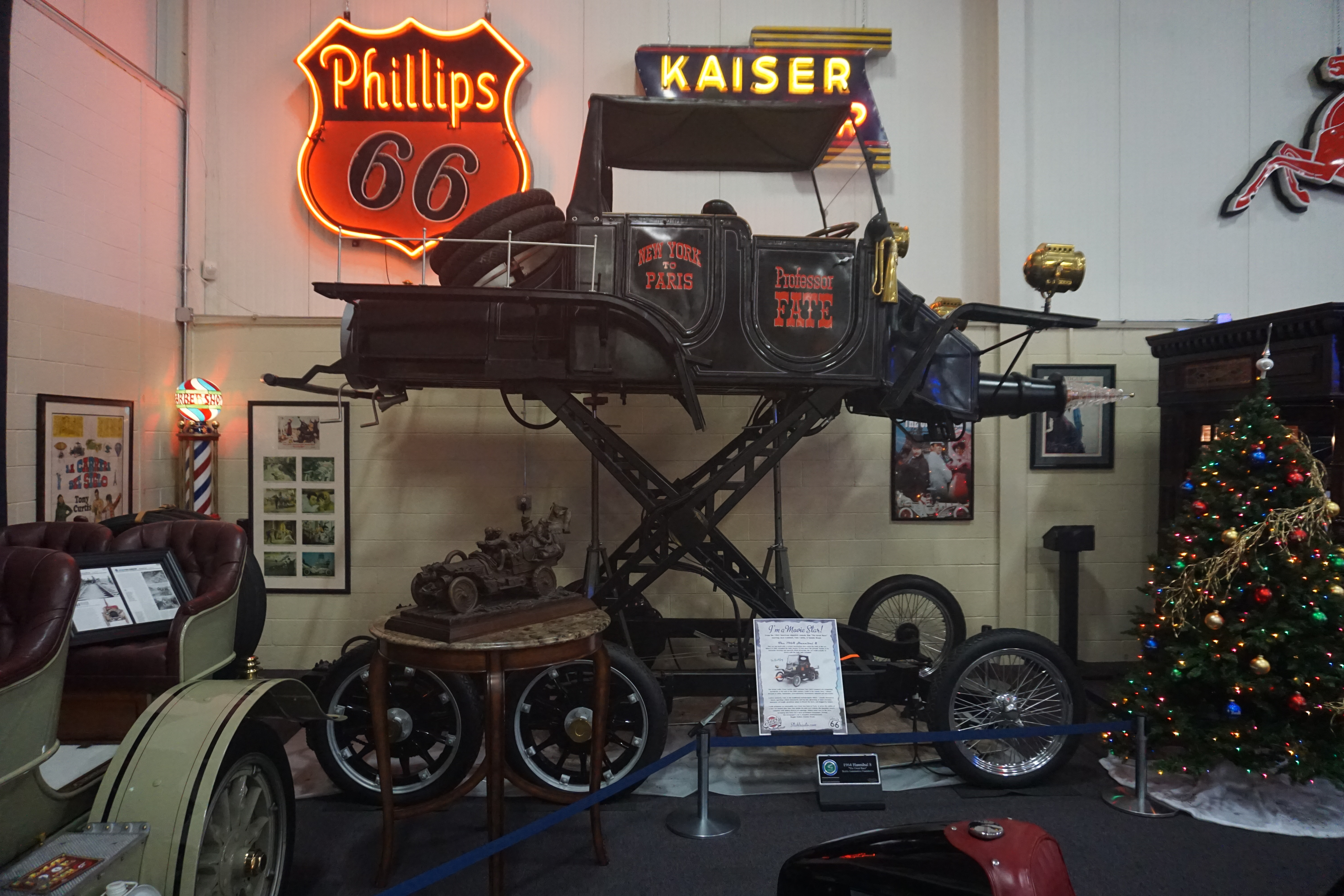
Hannibal Twin-8 from The Great Race at Stahls Automotive Collection

The hero's white car, the Leslie Special, was built by Warner Bros. to resemble a Thomas Flyer, the car that won the 1908 New York to Paris Race. According to the Petersen Automotive Museum, four Leslie Specials were built. One of the four is at the Tupelo Automobile Museum in Tupelo, Mississippi, listed as a 1963 Leslie Special Convertible.

Another of the four appears painted dark green in the 1970 Warner Bros. film The Ballad of Cable Hogue—the grille can be seen bearing the words Leslie Special, with the wheels and tires remaining their original white color. This vehicle shows up during the last 30 minutes of the movie carrying a lead character and has a pivotal role at the end of the movie.

The villain's black car was named the Hannibal Twin-8; five were constructed. One is on display at the Petersen Automotive Museum, powered by a Volkswagen industrial engine. Another is at the Volo Auto Museum in Volo, Illinois. This model includes a prop "cannon" and a working smoke generator. The Volo museum describes the Hannibal Twin-8 as built by Warner Bros. at a cost of US$150,000 ($1.2 million in 2024 dollars), powered by a Corvair six-cylinder engine with three-speed manual transmission and six wheels. All four rear wheels are powered by a chain drive.

Both vehicles were first on display at Movie World's Cars of the Stars Motor Museum in Buena Park, California, until the museum closed in the late 1970s. It was located adjacent to the Planes of Fame Museum. Also, a die cast toy car of the Leslie Special was issued as part of the best-selling TV and movie tie-in series produced by Corgi Toys in the mid-1960s.

=== Pie fight ===
The Technicolor scene for the pie fight in the royal bakery was filmed over five days. The first pastry thrown was part of a large cake decorated for King Friedrich Hapnick (Lemmon)'s coronation. Following this was the throwing of 4,000 pies, the most pies ever filmed in a pie fight. The scene lasts four minutes and 20 seconds and cost US$200,000 ($1.5 million in 2024 dollars) to shoot; US$18,000 ($140,000 in 2024 dollars) just for the pastry.

Colorful cream pies with fillings such as raspberry, strawberry, blueberry, and lemon were used. For continuity between days of shooting, the actors were photographed at the end of each day and then made up the following morning to have the same colorful appearance and the same smears of pie crust and filling.

Edwards told the cast that a pie fight by itself is not funny, so to make it funny, they would build tension by having the hero, dressed all in white, fail to get hit with any pies. He said, "The audience will start yearning for him to get it". Finally, the hero was to take a (white) pie in the face at "just the right moment".

Shooting was halted while the actors took the weekend off. Over the weekend, the pie residue spoiled all over the scenery. When the actors returned Monday morning, the set stank so badly that the building required a thorough cleaning and large fans to blow out the sour air. The missing pie residue was recreated carefully with more pies and shooting resumed.

At first, the actors had fun with the pie fight assignment, but eventually the process grew wearisome and dangerous. Wood choked briefly on pie filling, which hit her open mouth. Lemmon exaggerated that he got knocked out a few times; he said "a pie hitting you in the face feels like a ton of cement". At the end of shooting, when Edwards called "cut!", he was barraged with several hundred pies that members of the cast had hidden, waiting for the moment.

The pie fight scene paid homage to the early Mack Sennett practice of using a single thrown pie as comedic punctuation, but to a greater degree, it was a celebration of movie pie fights such as Behind the Screen (1916) with Charlie Chaplin; The Battle of the Century (1927) starring Stan Laurel and Oliver Hardy; and In the Sweet Pie and Pie (1941) with the Three Stooges. In his script for The Great Race, Edwards called for a "Battle of the Century–style pie fight". Although Edwards used 4,000 pies over five days, many of these were used as set dressing for continuity. Laurel and Hardy used 3,000 pies in only one day of shooting, so more are seen flying through the air. Leonard Maltin compared The Great Race pie fight to The Battle of the Century and determined that Laurel and Hardy's pacing was far superior, that the more modern film suffered from an "incomplete understanding of slapstick", while the 1927 pie fight remains "one of the great scenes in all of screen comedy."

== Reception ==
The Great Race was generally not well-received upon release, and critical assessment was mostly negative, making it the first notable failure for director Edwards. Most critics attacked its blatant and overdone slapstick humor and its lack of substance. It also suffered from comparisons with another race-themed "epic comedy" of 1965, Those Magnificent Men in Their Flying Machines. Film critic Richard Schickel wrote that although the film "bumps along very pleasantly for the most part", Edwards failed at his attempt to recreate the slapstick atmosphere of a Laurel and Hardy comedy. Schickel felt that Wood was "hopelessly miscast" and that the energies of Lemmon and Curtis did not quite make the slapstick work. Maltin wrote that Wood "never looked better" and that the film's comedy sometimes worked but was otherwise forced: "a mixed bag". On review aggregator Rotten Tomatoes, the film has an approval rating of 72% based on 25 reviews, with an average score of 6.00/10.

Despite earning theatrical rentals of over $11.4 million in the United States and Canada, due to its high cost, it caused a loss to the studio.

== Accolades ==
Award	Category	Nominee(s)	Result	Ref.
Academy Awards	Best Cinematography – Color	Russell Harlan	Nominated	
Academy Awards	Best Film Editing	Ralph E. Winters	Nominated	
Academy Awards	Best Song	"The Sweetheart Tree"; Music by Henry Mancini, Lyrics by Johnny Mercer	Nominated	
Academy Awards	Best Sound	George Groves	Nominated	
Academy Awards	Best Sound Effects	Treg Brown	Won	
Golden Globe Awards	Best Motion Picture – Musical or Comedy		Nominated	
Golden Globe Awards	Best Actor in a Motion Picture – Musical or Comedy	Jack Lemmon	Nominated	
Golden Globe Awards	Best Original Score – Motion Picture	Henry Mancini	Nominated	
Golden Globe Awards	Best Original Song – Motion Picture	"The Sweetheart Tree"; Music by Henry Mancini, Lyrics by Johnny Mercer	Nominated	
Golden Reel Awards	Best Sound Editing – Feature Film		Won (Note: Tied with Von Ryan's Express.)	
Laurel Awards	Top Comedy		Nominated	
Laurel Awards	Top Male Comedy Performance	Jack Lemmon	Nominated	
Laurel Awards	Top Song	"The Sweetheart Tree"; Music by Henry Mancini, Lyrics by Johnny Mercer	5th Place	
Moscow International Film Festival	Grand Prix	Blake Edwards	Nominated	
Moscow International Film Festival	Silver Prize	Blake Edwards	Won	
Saturn Awards	Best DVD Classic Film Release		Nominated	
Writers Guild of America Awards	Best Written American Comedy	Arthur A. Ross	Nominated	

== Soundtrack ==
Before the film was released, the soundtrack was re-recorded in Hollywood by RCA Victor Records for release on vinyl LP. Henry Mancini spent six weeks composing the score and the recording involved some 80 musicians. Mancini collaborated with lyricist Johnny Mercer on several songs including "The Sweetheart Tree", a waltz released as a single. The song plays on along the film as the main theme without chorus (except in the entr' acte), and it was performed onscreen by Natalie Wood with the voice dubbed by Jackie Ward. It was nominated for but did not win an Academy Award for Best Original Song. The full track listing is:

- "He Shouldn't-A, Hadn't-A, Oughtn't-A Swang on Me" – Mancini/Mercer
  - Performed by Dorothy Provine
- "Buffalo Gals" – Traditional Western song performed by the chorus girls in Boracho saloon, with different lyrics and a middle section, for a 1900s atmosphere
- "The Sweetheart Tree" (chorus) – Mancini
- "The Royal Waltz" – Mancini
- "Great Race March" – Mancini
- "They're Off!" – Mancini
- "Push the Button, Max!" (Professor Fate's theme) – Mancini
- "The Great Race March" – Mancini
- "Cold Finger" – Mancini
- "Music to Become King By" – Mancini
- "Night, Night, Sweet Prince" – Mancini
- "The Pie in the Face Polka" – Mancini
- "The Desert Song"
  - Music by Sigmund Romberg
- "It Looks Like a Big Night Tonight"
  - Music by Egbert Van Alstyne
- "Big Night Tonight"
- "Toccata and Fugue in D minor, BWV 565"
  - Written by Johann Sebastian Bach
- "Tales from the Vienna Woods"
  - Written by Johann Strauss
- "The Beautiful Blue Danube"
  - Written by Johann Strauss

== Adaptations ==
Slightly in advance of the film's release, as was the custom of the era, a paperback novelization of the film was published by Dell Books. The author was renowned crime and Western novelist Marvin H. Albert.

The novelization, based on the screenplay rather than the finished film, differs from the film in various aspects. In the novel, the country of Carpania is called Ruritania (as in Hope's Prisoner of Zenda), Keenan Wynn's character is called Jebediah (not Hezekiah) and stays behind in Ruritania, having fallen in love with a local noblewoman. The pie fight is missing and the drivers are chased by cowboys (rather than Native Americans) before arriving in Boracho. A few minor changes concern Leslie's courting of Maggie Dubois; in the novelization, she suggests sharing the blanket in the snowstorm and she also drives the Leslie Special while Leslie has his arm in a sling. Scenes not included in the film include a rainstorm, Fate's car sinking in a river, and a more extended stay in Russia (mirroring the Boracho episode).

- Dell Movie Classic: The Great Race (March 1966)

== Legacy ==
The film was a major influence on Wacky Races, a Hanna-Barbera cartoon series. The film's characterizations were rather cartoonish. Furthermore, film editor and sound-effects man Treg Brown, who worked on many classic Warner Bros. cartoons, worked on this film. Brown's sound design won the film an Academy Award for Best Sound Effects.

== See also ==
- Monte Carlo or Bust!, or Those Daring Young Men in Their Jaunty Jalopies (1969)
