= Montague Roberts =

Early 20th century race car driver

Montague Roberts (1883–1957) was an American race car driver.

He was born in Pittsburgh, Pennsylvania. He earned a degree in mechanical engineering from the State University of New York via correspondence courses and became a licensed engineer. During the first world war, he led the US government's helium production efforts.

He is famous for being one of the winning drivers in the 1908 New York to Paris automobile race with his team beating the second place car by 26 days. Prior to the race, Robets was well known in the American racing curcuit for driving cars from the Thomas Motor Company. The previous year, he had participated in a 24-hour race at Morris Park Racetrack and returned in 1909 to tow Laurence J. Lesh in a glider exhibition after the location had been converted into the Morris Park Aerodrome.

He died on September 20, 1957, in Presbyterian Hospital in Newark, New Jersey.
