= 1909 in aviation =

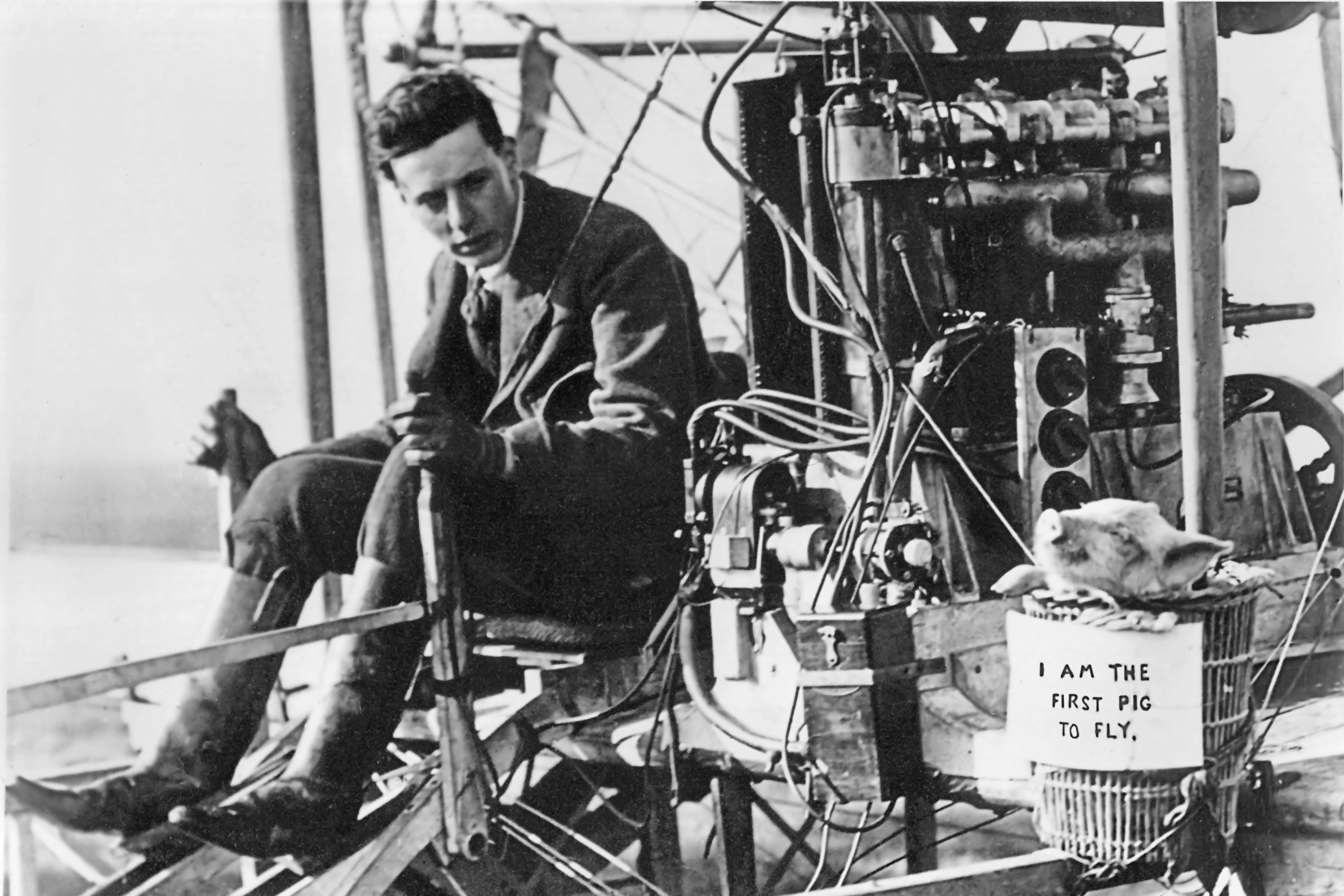
On November 4, 1909, as a joke to prove that pigs could fly, John Moore-Brabazon makes the first live cargo flight by airplane when he puts a small pig in a waste-paper basket tied to a wing-strut of his airplane.

This is a list of aviation-related events from 1909:

== Events ==
- The French aircraft designer and manufacturer Édouard Nieuport makes some brief straight-line flights in his first aircraft, a small monoplane powered by a 20-horsepower (15-kilowatt) Darracq engine.
- Fort Omaha Balloon School becomes the first United States Army school for balloon observers.
- The Austro-Hungarian Navy sends officers abroad for flight training.
- In the book L'Aviation Militaire ("Military Aviation"), Clément Ader writes ...an aircraft carrier will become indispensable. Such ships will be very differently constructed from anything in existence today. To start with, the deck will have been cleared of any obstacles: it will be a flat area, as wide as possible, not conforming to the lines of the hull, and will resemble a landing strip. The speed of this ship will have to be at least as great as that of cruisers or even greater...Servicing the aircraft will have to be done below this deck...Access to this lower deck will be by means of a lift long enough and wide enough to take an aircraft with its wings folded...Along the sides will be the workshops of the mechanics responsible for refitting the planes and for keeping them always ready for flight. Discussing the landing of aircraft, he writes, The ship will be headed straight into the wind, the stern clear, but a padded bulwark set up forward in case the airplane should run past the stop line.

=== January–March ===
- 7 January – The Aéro-Club de France issues its first eight aviator certificates. Léon Delagrange is among the recipients.
- 23 February – John McCurdy makes the first aeroplane flight in Canada in the AEA Silver Dart. He flies 2,640 feet (805 m) from the ice of Bras d'Or Lake at Baddeck on Cape Breton Island.
- 3 March – American aviators Glenn Curtiss, Augustus Moore Herring and Cortlandt Field Bishop announce plans to manufacture airplanes commercially in the United States. They found the Herring-Curtiss Company.

=== April–June ===
- 1 April – After three previous postponements due to construction delays and poor weather, a fourth attempt is made to open the world's first purpose-built airfield, Port-Aviation (often referred to as "Juvisy Airfield") in Viry-Chatillon in the Grand Paris (Greater Paris) region of France. Archbishop of Paris Léon-Adolphe Amette blesses the airfield and two airplanes, but a hard rain prevents flying and forces another postponement.
- 15 April – The first airport and flying school in Italy opens at Centocelle Airport in Rome. The opening coincides with a visit by Wilbur Wright, who gives a flight demonstration of a Wright airplane.
- 16 April – Wilbur Wright takes former Italian prime minister Sidney Sonnino on a flight at Centocelle Airport, making Sonnino one of the earliest statesmen and the first former head of government to fly in an aeroplane.
- 23 April – French aviator Georges Legagneux flies over Vienna in a Voisin Farman I biplane. It is the first fixed-wing aircraft flight in Austria.
- 2 May – John Moore-Brabazon the first resident British citizen to make a recognised powered heavier-than-air flight in the United Kingdom, flying from The Aero Club's ground at Leysdown on the Isle of Sheppey in his Voisin biplane Bird of Passage.
- 7 May – The British Royal Navy awards a contract to build its first rigid airship to Vickers.
- 14 May – Samuel Cody makes an aeroplane flight in the United Kingdom longer than 1 mile (1.6 km) in British Army Aeroplane No. 1.
- 23 May – After four previous postponements due to construction delays and poor weather, the world's first purpose-built airfield, Port-Aviation (often referred to as "Juvisy Airfield") in Viry-Chatillon in the Grand Paris (Greater Paris) region of France, finally opens. On its first day, it hosts the world's first air race for heavier-than-air aircraft, requiring participants to complete ten 1.2-kilometre (0.75 mi; 0.65 nmi) laps around two pylons positioned 600 metres (1,969 ft) apart in the fastest time or, if no one completes ten laps, to travel the greatest distance. Léon Delagrange wins by completing slightly more than five laps at an altitude ranging from 5 metres (16.5 feet) on his first lap to 15 metres (49 ft) on later laps, flying 5.8 kilometres (3.6 mi) in 10 minutes 18 seconds, with an average speed calculated as 33.75 kilometres per hour (20.97 mph). However, this was based on the distance between the two pylons multiplied by the number of laps he flew between them, not the actual distance he flew, which was considerably farther and would have resulted in the calculation of a higher average speed.
- 26 May – The Zeppelin LZ 5 sets an endurance record by completing a 712-mile (1,146 km) nonstop trip in 37 hours 39 minutes.
- 30 May – Count Ferdinand von Zeppelin pilots a Zeppelin on a 22-hour flight that covers 400 miles (644 km).
- 2 June – The United States Army orders its Signal Corps, which includes the Army's Aeronautic Corps as one of its divisions, to prepare plans for the air defense of the United States East Coast.
- 5 June – Alliott Verdon Roe begins flights in the first fixed-wing aircraft of all-British manufacture, the Roe I Triplane, from Walthamstow Marshes.
- 27 June – 17-year-old Eric Gordon England flies French-born painter José Weiss's tailless glider Olive from a launch ramp above Amberley, West Sussex, England, in the first recorded soaring flight. It is the origin of sport gliding.
- 26 June – An Aeronautical Society of New York exhibition takes place at Morris Park Aerodrome.

=== July–September ===
- The International Exhibition of Aviation opens in Frankfurt-am-Main (now known as ILA and regularly held in Berlin).
- 3 July – Louis Blériot achieves a flight of over 26 miles (42 km) in just over 47 minutes.
- 12 July – Flying the Blériot XII, Louis Blériot makes the world's first airplane flight with two passengers, one of whom is Alberto Santos-Dumont.
- 19 July – Hubert Latham makes the first attempt to cross the English Channel. He flies 11.2 kilometres (7 mi) from Calais in an Antoinette IV monoplane before suffering engine failure and making history's first landing of an aircraft in the sea about halfway across. He becomes the first aviator to be rescued from the English Channel when French Navy destroyer Harpon picks him up.
- 20 July – Orville Wright sets a new United States airplane endurance record, remaining aloft for 1 hour 20 minutes 25 seconds.
- 25 July
  - Louis Blériot claims a £1,000 prize from the British Daily Mail newspaper for being the first pilot to cross the English Channel in an airplane. He makes the crossing in his Blériot Type XI, flying 21 miles (34 km) from Les Barraques near Calais to Northfall Meadow near Dover Castle in 37 minutes. Blériot also receives an additional £3,000 from the French government.
  - While Bleriot warms up his Blériot XI prior to his flight, a farm dog runs into the plane's propeller and is killed. It is the first terrestrial wildlife strike involving an aircraft ever recorded.
  - According to some sources, an aviator named Van Der Schrouff makes the first airplane flight in the Russian Empire, with a flight over Odessa. Other sources credit the French aviator Georges Legagneux with the first flight in Russia, in September.
- 28 July – Harold Barnwell makes the first powered flight in Scotland, an 80-yard (75 m) hop at 4 m altitude in a canard biplane built with his brother Frank at Stirling, before crashing.
- 29 July – French aviator Georges Legagneux flies over Stockholm, the first airplane flight in Sweden.
- 30 July
  - The Imperial Japanese Army, the Imperial Japanese Navy, and Tokyo Imperial University form the Provisional Military Balloon Research Society to investigate flying machines for Japanese use.
  - Orville Wright flies with passenger Lt. Benjamin Foulois at an average 42.58 miles per hour (68.53 km/h) mph over a measured round-trip course, successfully completing flight tests in the Wright Military Flyer for the U.S. Army at Fort Myer, Virginia. The Army buys the airplane for $30,000.

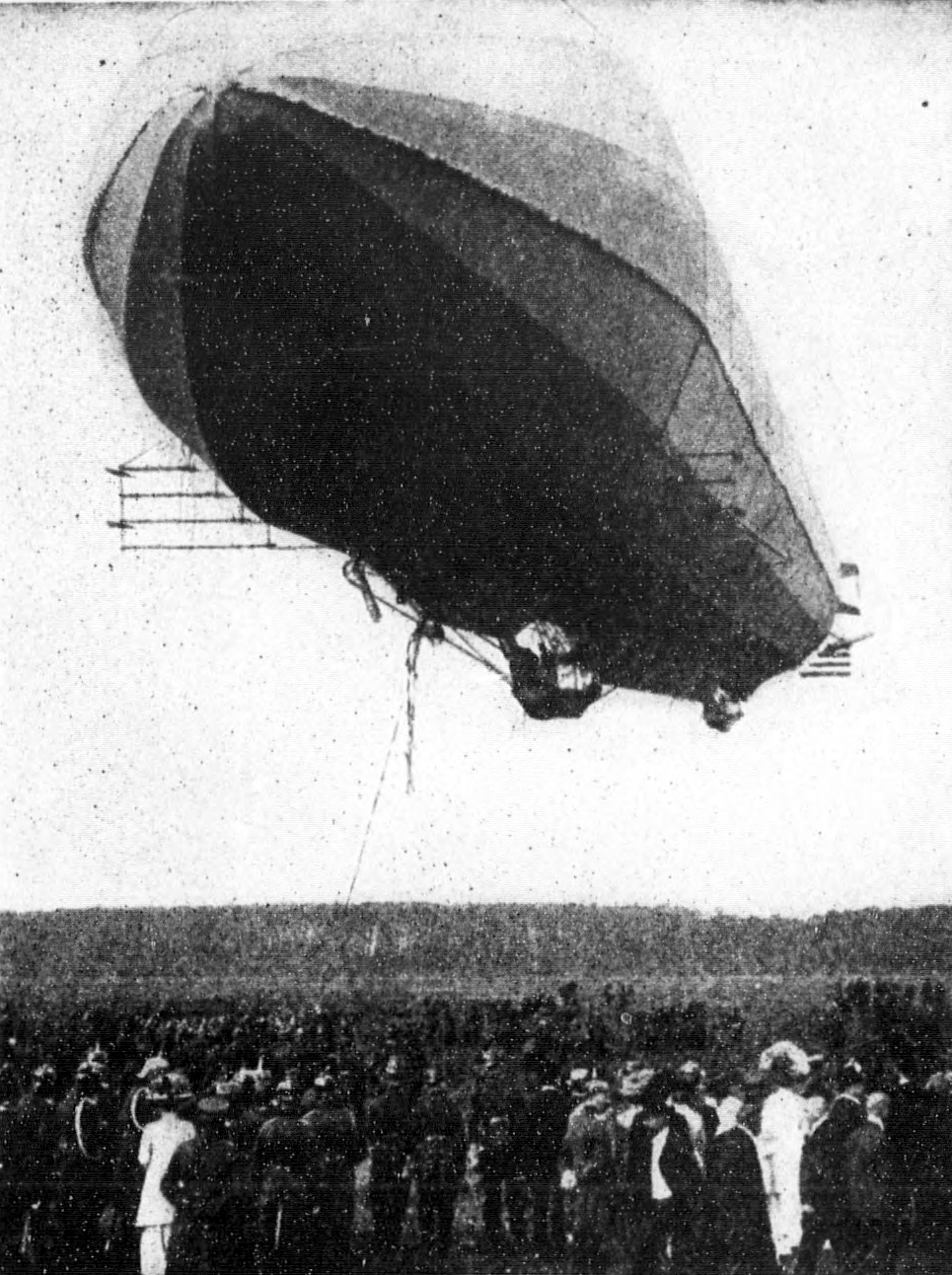
The Zeppelin LZ 3, a few seconds before landing.

- 7 August – French aviator Roger Sommer sets a new world airplane endurance record, remaining aloft for 2 hours 27 minutes 15 seconds.
- 22–29 August – The Grande Semaine d'Aviation (the Rheims Aero meet) is held at Bétheny, near Rheims:
- 26 August – The Antoinette IV airplane sets a world distance record at Rheims, flying 154.6 km (96.1 mi) in 2 hours 17 minutes 21 seconds:
- 27 August – Henri Farman raises the airplane distance record to 180 km (110 mi).
- 28 August
  - At Rheims, Glenn Curtiss wins the first airplane race held for the Gordon Bennett Cup, flying 20 km (12.42 miles) in 15 minutes 50.6 seconds at an average speed of 47 mph (75.7 km/h), finishing 5.6 seconds ahead of Louis Blériot.
  - Louis Blériot sets a world speed record over a 10 km (6.2 mi) circuit at a speed of 76.95 km/h (47.81 mph).
- 29 August – 100,000 people gather at Tempelhof Field to witness the arrival at Berlin, Germany, of the Zeppelin LZ 3, with Hugo Eckener in command and Count Ferdinand von Zeppelin aboard. More than two million more people watch from rooftops.
- 2 September – Scarborough Beach Amusement Park in the Beaches neighborhood of Toronto, Ontario, Canada hosts one of the first, if not the first, air shows in North America. The show features one plane, a Curtiss Golden Flyer piloted by Charles Willard, which on the first evening is forced to make an emergency landing in Lake Ontario after only a few seconds in the air.
- 7 September – Eugene Lefebvre is killed in the crash of an aeroplane when his controls jam at Port-Aviation (often called "Juvisy Airfield") at Viry-Châtillon, France. He is the second person in history to die in a powered-aircraft crash, and the first pilot to die while at the controls of a powered aircraft.
- 8 September – Samuel Cody flies from Aldershot to Farnborough and back (46 miles in 1 hour and 3 minutes), the first recorded cross-country flight in the United Kingdom.
- 15 September – The French aviator Georges Legagneux makes five short flights from Khodynka Field near Moscow. According to some sources, they are the first aircraft flights in the Russian Empire, while other sources credit an aviator named Van Der Schrouff with the first flight in Russia, in July 1909.
- 22 September – Ferdinand Ferber is killed in a taxying accident at Boulogne, France.
- 24 September – Wilbur Wright express his desire that foreign aircraft be prohibited from entering the United States.
- 25 September
  - The French government's third airship, the semi-rigid La République, collapses in flight after a broken propeller blade pierces her envelope and crashes near the Château of Avrilly, France, killing her entire crew of four.
  - The first National Aeronautic Show opens at Madison Square Garden in New York City.
- 26 September – The brothers Alexander and Anatol Renner fly an airship (which they have designed and built themselves) for the first time, making eight flights over the autumn fair at Graz. These are the first airship flights in Austria-Hungary.
- 29 September – Wilbur Wright begins flights as part of New York City's Hudson-Fulton Celebration.

=== October–December ===
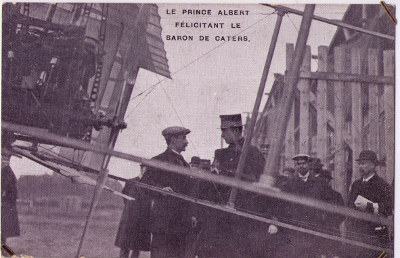
The then Prince Albert of Belgium congratulates baron Pierre de Caters at the Antwerp Aviation Week (23 October- 2 November)

- 2 October – Orville Wright sets a new world altitude record for airplanes, reaching an estimated 500 meters (1,640 feet) over Potsdam, Germany.
- 15–23 October – Britain's first Aviation Meeting held at Doncaster Racecourse.
- 22 October – Baroness Raymonde de Laroche flies in a fixed-wing aircraft. (See also September 1908).
- 26 October – Marie Marvingt pilots a balloon across the North Sea and the English Channel from Europe to England.
- 30 October – John Moore-Brabazon flies a circular mile in the Short Biplane No. 2 in the UK and wins £1,000 from the Daily Mail newspaper.
- The Austro-Hungarian Army's first airship, Militärluftschiff I (or M.I), makes its first flight. Among its passengers on the flight is Ferdinand Porsche.
- 3 November
  - Alec Ogilvie patents the first airspeed indicator.
  - Henry Farman makes a flight of 234.212 km (145.533 mi) lasting 4 hours 6 minutes 25 seconds at Châlons-en-Champagne, France. It will win him the 1909 International Michelin Cup for the longest nonstop distance flown during 1909.
- 4 November – John Moore-Brabazon makes the first live cargo flight by airplane when he puts a small pig in a waste-paper basket tied to a wing-strut of his airplane. He chooses a pig as a joking refutation of the common phrase "when pigs fly," meaning something that will never happen.
- 16 November – The first air transport company (or airline) in the world, the German Airship Travel Corporation (known by its German language acronym DELAG), is founded at Frankfurt-am-Main, Germany, flying Zeppelins.
- 20 November – Cerchez & Co., the first aircraft company, first aerodrome, and first flight school in Romania, is founded at Chitila by Mihail Cerchez.
- 5 December – George Taylor becomes the first person to fly a heavier-than-air craft in Australia, in a glider he designed. On the same day Florence Taylor becomes the first woman in Australia to fly a heavier-than-air craft, in the glider designed by her husband.
- 8 December – With Enea Bossi, Sr., at the controls, the first Italian-designed and -built airplane to fly takes to the air for the first time. Bossi, Giuseppe Bellanco, and Paolo Invernizzi had designed it.
- 31 December – Harry Ferguson becomes the first person to fly an aircraft in Ireland, when he takes off in a monoplane he had designed and built himself.

== First flights ==
- Nieuport 1909 monoplane, Édouard Nieuport's first aircraft

=== January ===
- 23 January – Blériot XI

=== May ===
- 21 May – Blériot XII
- 24 May – Blackburn First Monoplane

=== June ===
- 5 June – Roe I Triplane
- 28 June – Breguet Type I

=== August ===
- 17 August – Grade monoplane

=== December ===
- De Havilland Biplane No. 1 (crashes)

== Entered service ==
=== March ===
- Zeppelin LZ 3 into the German Army as the Z 1.

=== August ===
- 1 August – Wright Military Flyer into the US Army as Aeroplane No. 1
