= 1908 in aviation =

This is a list of aviation-related events from 1908:

== Events ==
- The United States Army announces plans to buy flying machines.
- Fiat begins to manufacture aero engines.
- The French aircraft designer and manufacturer Édouard Nieuport begins the construction of his first aircraft, a small monoplane powered by a 20-horsepower (15-kilowatt) Darracq engine.

=== January–March ===
- 8 January – Count Ferdinand von Zeppelin announces plans to build an airship capable of carrying 100 passengers.
- 13 January – Henri Farman wins the $10,000 Deutsch-Archdeacon Prize for making the world's first circular flight of at least 1 km (0.62 mi) in a Voisin 1907 biplane. In a flight of 1 minute 28 seconds at Issy-les-Moulineaux, France, he flies well over a kilometer at an altitude of 25 to 30 feet (7.6 to 9.1 meters).
- March – Michelin announces the Michelin Cup, a prize to be awarded for the longest distance covered by an airplane in a single flight during the calendar year, beginning with 1908. Initially, the prize is be presented annually for a period of eight years.
- 17 March – AEA Red Wing is destroyed in a crash on its second flight.
- 21 March – Henri Farman makes the first flight carrying a passenger in a biplane.

=== April–June ===
- 14 May – Charles Furnas becomes the first passenger in an aeroplane in the United States, piloted by Wilbur Wright. They fly for a distance of approximately 600m in 28-3/5ths seconds in the Wright 1905 Flyer, modified with seats for pilot and passenger. Shortly after, Orville Wright flies Furnas for 4.12 km in 4 minutes 2-2/5ths seconds.
- 22 May – The Wright brothers register their airplane with the United States Patent Office.
- 31 May – Henry Farman is reported to have flown with a Mlle. P. Van Pottelsberghe de la Potterie, daughter of the mayor of Desteldonk in Ghent, Belgium. She is the first woman passenger in an aeroplane.
- June – Alliott Verdon Roe performs taxiing and towed flight trials with his first powered aeroplane at Brooklands, Surrey.
- 28 June – Jacob Ellehammer makes the first piloted, powered aeroplane flight in Germany.

=== July–September ===
- The Royal Navy's Director of Naval Ordnance, Captain Reginald Bacon, recommends that the Royal Navy acquire an airship to compete with the Kaiserliche Marine's Zeppelins.
- 4 July – Glenn H. Curtiss is awarded the Scientific American trophy for being the first person in the United States to make a public flight of over 1 km (0.62 mi) in the AEA June Bug. The award is for a flight at Hammondsport in which he flies 1,550 m (5,090 ft) in 1 minute and 42 seconds.
- 8 July – Thérèse Peltier officially becomes the first woman to fly in an aeroplane. She is a passenger on a flight made by Léon Delagrange at Turin. However, this flight may not have been fully controlled. See also #May and #October.
- 30 July – Seeking a venue to host aviation events in the Grand Paris (Greater Paris) region of France better than the racetracks and military maneuver grounds used previously, the Société d’Encouragement à l’Aviation (Society for the Encouragement of Aviation) is formed to establish the world's first true airfield designed specifically for the use of aviators, as well as the world's first aviation school and first aviation competition. The Society's work will result in the opening of Port-Aviation, an aviation event venue considered the world's first purpose-built airfield, in 1909.
- 8 August – Wilbur Wright makes his first flights at the Hunaudières racetrack at Le Mans, France. The Wright Flyer used for this and later flights had been shipped to Le Havre by Orville the previous year. It had been seriously damaged by custom officials when it arrived in France and was uncrated. Wilbur spent the whole summer of 1908 rebuilding the machine and getting it into flying condition. Wilbur's flights in this machine will have a profound effect on European aviation during the following months.
- 9 August – In the Ferber IX, French aviator Georges Legagneux makes a flight at Issy-les-Moulineaux, France, that wins him the Aero Club de France's third and final 200-metre (656 ft) prize. He will be retrospectively disqualified in September for making the flight too early in the morning.
- 20 August – Robert Gastambide becomes the first passenger carried by a monoplane when he is taken up on the Antoinette II.
- 21 August
  - Wilbur Wright moves to Camp d'Auvours, 11 kilometres (6.8 mi) east of Le Mans, where all his flights for the remainder of the year will be based.
  - The Antoinette II flies the first circle by a monoplane.
- 3 September – Seeking a contract to build the United States Army's first airplane, Orville Wright begins flight trials before Army observers at Fort Myer, Virginia, in a new Wright Model A flyer. The flight lasts 1 minute 11 seconds.
- 6 September – Léon Delagrange sets distance and endurance records with a flight of 24.727 kilometres (15.365 mi) lasting 29 minutes 53.8 seconds at Issy-les-Moulineaux, France.
- 9 September – At Fort Myer, Orville Wright sets three world records: a flight endurance record of 57 minutes 13 seconds on his first flight, a new flight endurance record of 1 hour 2 minutes and 15 seconds on his second flight (the world's first airplane flight of over one hour), and an endurance record for a flight with a passenger (Army Lieutenant Frank P. Lahm) of 6 minutes 24 seconds on his third flight.
- 10 September – At Fort Myer, Orville Wright sets a world flight endurance record of 1 hour 5 minutes and 52 seconds.
- 11 September – At Fort Myer, Orville Wright sets a world flight endurance record of 1 hour 10 minutes and 24 seconds.
- 12 September – At Fort Myer, Orville Wright sets a world record for flight endurance with a passenger (Army Major George O. Squier) of 9 minutes 6 1/3 seconds.
- 17 September – U.S. Army Lieutenant Thomas Selfridge becomes the first person killed in a powered aircraft crash and the first military aviation casualty when the Wright Model A, piloted by Orville Wright during U.S. Army tests, suffers a broken propeller and crashes from an altitude of 75 feet (23 meters) at Fort Myer. Wright is severely injured.
- Thérèse Peltier makes a flight of 200 metres (656 feet) at a height of approximately 2.5 meters (8.2 feet) at the Military Square in Turin, Italy. Photos of Peltier with the aeroplane are published on 27 September. Unofficially, it is the first flight by a female aviator.
- 28 September – At Camp d'Avours, France, Wilbur Wright sets a world airplane endurance record in a flight of 1 hour 32 minutes, covering 61 miles (98 km), winning a $1,000 prize from the Aero Club of France for the longest flight in history over an enclosed ground.

=== October–December ===
- 3 October – George P. Dicken of the New York Herald becomes the first newspaper reporter to fly in an airplane when he rides as a passenger with Wilbur Wright at Camp d'Auvours. The flight sets a world record for the longest with a passenger, lasting 55 minutes 37 seconds.
- 5 October – The Zeppelin LZ IV is destroyed by fire at Echterdingen, Germany.
- 6 October – At Camp d'Avours, Wilbur Wright sets another world record for a flight with a passenger, remaining aloft for 1 hour 4 minutes 26 seconds. He wins a $100,000 prize from a French syndicate for making two record-setting flights with a passenger within the same week.
- 7 October – Wilbur Wright flies with Edith Ogilby Berg, aka Mrs. Hart O. Berg, as passenger at Camp d'Auvours. This is the first fully controlled flight with a woman passenger.
- 16 October – Samuel Cody makes his first aeroplane flight in the United Kingdom in British Army Aeroplane No. 1.
- 18 October – Wilbur Wright climbs to 115 metres (377 ft) above Camp d'Auvours.
- 30 October – Henry Farman makes the first cross-country flight in a power-driven aeroplane, flying from Bouy to Reims 27 kilometres (17 mi) in 20 minutes.
- November – Horace, Eustace, and Oswald Short found Short Brothers, the first aircraft manufacturing company in England, in Battersea, London.
- 1 November – Flights begin from the world's first purpose-built airfield, Port-Aviation (often called "Juvisy Airfield") in Viry-Chatillon in the Grand Paris (Greater Paris) region of France, when the Ligue National Aérienne (National Aviation League) opens a flying school there operating two Voisin airplanes. The school's instructor is Ferdinand Ferber, and Igor Sikorsky enrolls for flying lessons. Port-Aviation remains under construction and will not open officially until 1909.
- 3 November – An Aeronautical Society of New York exhibition takes place at Morris Park Aerodrome.
- 18 December
  - Wilbur Wright at Camp d'Auvours(fr), 11 kilometres (6.8 miles) east of Le Mans, France, flies 99.8 kilometres (62.0 mi) in 1 hour 54 minutes 2/5 second, rising to an altitude of 110 meters (361 feet) – a new world record.
  - American aeronaut and aerial photographer Melvin Vaniman flies a steel-tube-frame triplane he designed and built himself a distance of 150 meters (490 feet) above the parade ground at Issy-les-Moulineaux, France.
- 24 December – The first Paris Aeronautical Salon opens the Grand Palais.
- 31 December – Wilbur Wright sets a new nonstop distance record for an airplane, flying 123.2 kilometres (76.6 mi) on a triangular course in 2 hours 18 minutes 33.2 seconds at Camp d'Auvours in Le Mans, France. He wins the 1908 Michelin Cup, a prize of FF20,000 from Michelin, for the longest nonstop distance in a single flight in 1908.

== First flights ==
=== January–June ===
- 12 March - AEA Red Wing, flying from the surface of Keuka Lake near Hammondsport, New York. Flight distance is 97.2 metres (319 ft) but ends with the aircraft collapsing to the ground, leaving the pilot slightly bruised. This is the first public demonstration of a powered aircraft flight in the United States.
- 18 May - AEA White Wing
- 8 June - Roe I Biplane
- 21 June - AEA June Bug
- By 30 June - Blériot VIII, undated flight of some 730 metres (2,395 ft) at Issy-les-Moulineaux, France

=== July–December ===
- 5 September - Goupy No.1, the world's first triplane
- 19 October - Antoinette IV
- 6 December - AEA Silver Dart
