= Curtiss No. 2 =

No. 2, "Reims Racer"
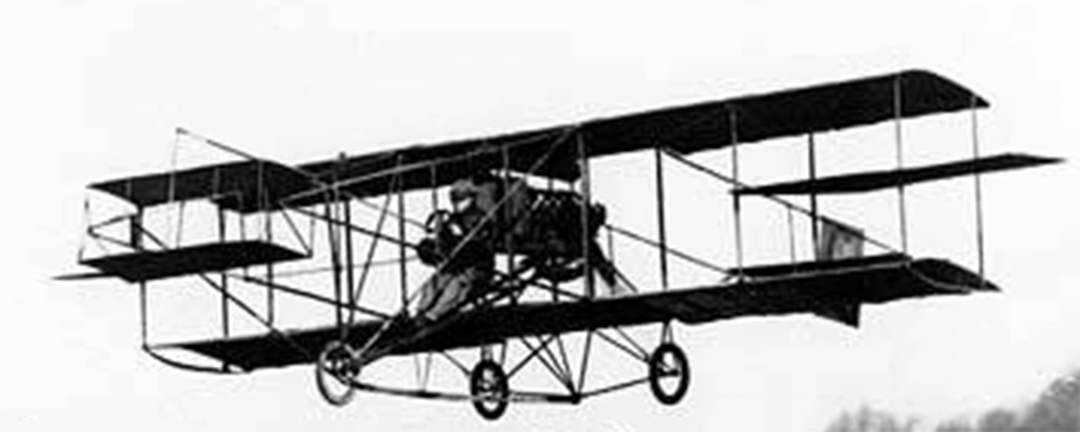
- Curtiss No. 2, March 1910

General information
- Type: Racing aircraft
- Manufacturer: Herring-Curtiss Company
- Designer: Glenn Curtiss
- Number built: 1

History
- First flight: 1909

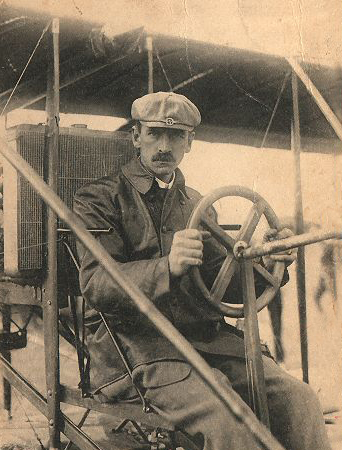
Curtiss at the controls of the Reims Racer

The Curtiss No. 2, often known as the Reims Racer, was a racing aircraft built in the United States by Glenn Curtiss in 1909 to contest the Gordon Bennett Cup air race in Reims, France that year.

== Design and characteristics ==
The No. 2 was a modified Golden Flyer (also known as the Curtiss No. 1), and was an open-framework biplane with two-bay unstaggered wings of equal span. It had an all-moving cruciform tail unit comprising a small elevator surface plus a rudder for directional control, but larger elevators were carried forward of the pilot as a biplane canard unit. The landing gear was in a tricycle configuration, with three individual wheels. Large ailerons were carried in the interplane gap.

Curtiss had modified the Golden Flyer into the Reims Racer by adding a covered stabilizer unit at the canard position, increasing the wing size, modifying the interplane ailerons and replacing the 25 hp four cylinder inline Curtiss engine with a 63 hp Curtiss V8 that had been stripped down and specially lightened for the race. A new, lighter fuel tank was exchanged for the older, heavier one.

A transverse-rocking, metal framework "shoulder cradle", hinged longitudinally on either side of the pilot's seat, with forward-projecting members, one per side resting against the midpoint of each of the pilot's upper arms (see photo of Curtiss in the pilot's seat), achieved the connection between the pilot and aileron control cabling. This apparatus required the pilot to "lean-into" the turn to operate the ailerons and thus turn the aircraft in the same direction. This system was later used again in the Curtiss Model D.

== Operational history ==
Curtiss' participation in the race was sponsored by the Aero Club of America, which had offered to back him after a similar offer was turned down by the Wright brothers. While not as fast as its European competitors, the Reims Racer was more maneuverable, and Curtiss, who piloted the machine himself, was able to take advantage of this by paying special attention to his turns. The first competitor to fly, Curtiss recorded a time of 15 minutes 50.4 seconds for the two 10 km circuits required. When Louis Bleriot made the final flight of the competition, he recorded a time 5.8 seconds longer, leaving Curtiss to claim the FF 25,000 prize. Curtiss's flight, at an average speed of 47.06 mph (75.48 km/h) was also a new airspeed record for the distance.

After Reims, Curtiss took the aircraft to Italy, where he won events at a competition at the Air Show in Brescia in September 1909. There, he won the overall grand prize by flying the required five 10 km circuits in 49 minutes 24 seconds. He also won the quick starting prize, starting his engine in 8.2 seconds, and took second place to Henri Rougier in the altitude prize, climbing to 165 ft (51 m). While at Brescia, Curtiss gave Italian poet Gabriele d'Annunzio a short joyride, but declined a similar request by Princess Letizia on the grounds that the seat would be unsuitable.

Returning to the United States, Curtiss flew the Reims Racer in the country's first air meet at Dominguez Hills in October 1909, setting a new airspeed record of 55 mph (88 km/h).

Curtiss sold the Reims Racer to Charles Hamilton, who crashed it in Seattle on 12 March 1910.

== Specifications ==
Data from Aerofiles: Curtiss

General characteristics

- Crew: 1
- Capacity: 1 pax
- Length: 30 ft 4 in (9.25 m)
- Wingspan: 34 ft 0 in (10.36 m)
- Powerplant: 1 × Curtiss V-8 water-cooled piston engine, 63 hp (47 kW)
- Propellers: 2-bladed pusher propeller

Performance

- Maximum speed: 55 mph (89 km/h, 48 kn)
