= Curtiss No. 1 =

1900s experimental aircraft

No. 1 / Gold Bug / Golden Flyer
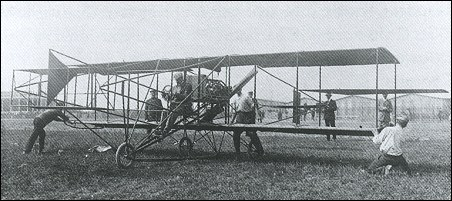

General information
- Type: Pioneer era aircraft
- Manufacturer: Herring-Curtiss Company
- Designer: Glenn Curtiss
- Number built: 1

History
- First flight: 1909
- Retired: 24 July 1909

The Curtiss No. 1 also known as the Curtiss Gold Bug or Curtiss Golden Flyer was a 1900s American early experimental aircraft, the first independent aircraft designed and built by Glenn Curtiss.

== Development ==
After his success with designing aircraft for the Aerial Experiment Association, Glenn Curtiss formed his own company, the Herring-Curtiss Company, in March 1909, in association with Augustus Herring. Earlier in the same month, the Aeronautical Society of New York had placed an order from Curtiss for a new aircraft. The Curtiss No. 1 was the first aircraft both designed and built by Curtiss. Curtiss flew the aircraft at the Society's Morris Park Aerodrome exhibition in June 1909 and then went on to win the Scientific American trophy (which he had won before in the AEA June Bug that he had designed). Encouraged by this success, Curtiss entered the aircraft into the first international air show to be held at Reims in France in August 1909. Before the international competition, the aircraft crashed and was badly damaged; Curtiss decided not to rebuild the aircraft and built a new aircraft, the Curtiss Reims Racer for the competition.

== Specifications ==
Data from Aerofiles : Curtiss

General characteristics

- Crew: 1
- Length: 30 ft 4 in (9.25 m)
- Wingspan: 28 ft 9 in (8.76 m)
- Powerplant: 1 × Curtiss C-4 4-cylinder in-line water-cooled piston engine, 25 hp (19 kW) to 30 hp (22 kW)
- Propellers: 2-bladed pusher propeller

Performance

- Maximum speed: 45 mph (72 km/h, 39 kn)
