= Dwiggins =

Dwiggins is a surname. Notable people with the surname include:

- Clare Victor Dwiggins (1874–1958), American cartoonist
- Don Dwiggins (1913–1988), American aviation journalist and author
- Sue Dwiggins (1914–2011), American writer and production assistant
- William Addison Dwiggins (1880–1956), American type designer, calligrapher, and book designer

== See also ==
- Diggins (disambiguation)
- Wiggins (surname)
