= Morris Park Aerodrome =

Defunct airport in the Bronx, New York (1908–1909)

- IATA: none; ICAO: none

Summary
- Operator: Aeronautical Society of New York
- Location: The Bronx, New York, US
- Opened: 1908
- Closed: 1909
- Coordinates: 40°51′0″N 73°51′20″W

Map
- Location in modern-day New York City

The Morris Park Aerodrome was a short-lived airfield that became the Morris Park section of the Bronx, New York City, United States. In operation from 1908 to 1909, it was the first flying field in the nation, occupying the grounds of the former Morris Park Racecourse. The Aeronautical Society of New York, after a split from the Aero Club of America, leased the land in 1908 and used it as an aerodrome for two years until it was redeveloped for residential use.

The Society used the grounds for building and testing aircraft, and for putting on public exhibitions including major events in November 1908 and June 1909. The former, captured in an oil painting by Rudolph Dirks titled The Fledglings, included several glider flights by sixteen-year-old Laurence Lesh, culminating in a crash in which he was severely injured. The latter had flights by Glenn Curtiss in Golden Flyer, his motorized biplane, including the first demonstration of a stable flight around a closed course using ailerons for lateral control. The exhibitions also featured balloons, kites, helicopters, parachute jumps, and ground vehicles driven by propellers known as wind wagons.

Other projects worked on during the two years of operation included a biplane by Wilbur Kimball using eight propellers and a novel rudder system for lateral control, as well as a biplane from Frederick Schneider with three adjustable-pitch propellers. Stanley Beach and Charles Willard constructed what is believed to be the first monoplane flown in the United States. Joel T. Rice demonstrated a 100-foot (30 m) long dirigible using vectored thrust, capable of carrying 15 passengers.

The aerodrome ceased operations at the end of 1909, when the land was given over to residential development. The Society moved its operations to a larger facility on Long Island, later known as Roosevelt Field.

== Origins ==
What the Society needed in the way of ground was not very easy to find. Free, open space over which to fly was not alone sufficient. It was equally, if not, indeed, still more necessary, that the grounds should be close to the city. For it was the ambition of the Society to have its grounds so near at hand that the distance should place no obstacle in the way even of the poorest inventor who wanted to run out to the workshops and devote his spare hours to the material realization of his ideas.

— Edward T. Tandy

In 1905, the Aero Club of America, patterned after the Aero Club of France, was formed as an offshoot of the Automobile Club of America. Three years later, in response to sentiment that the Aero Club should be more active, president Cortlandt Field Bishop appointed a committee of aviation chaired by Albert Triaca to promote more work on airplanes. The committee, however, was unable to make any progress; Society chronicler Edward T. Tandy later wrote, "they found their efforts smothered by a cold, wet blanket of official objection. When they attempted to persevere, they were promptly stopped. The power that ruled that organization did not believe in aviation ... The doing of anything practical was not to be attempted."

Unsatisfied with the lack of progress being made by the committee, fifty members of the club split off on June 10, 1908, forming the Aeronautical Society of New York. Initial membership included Lee Burridge, Albert Triaca, Wilbur Kimball, Roger Whitman, William Hammer, Leo Stevens, Daniel Brine, and Stanley Beach. Burridge (who later became President of the Society) spoke of plans to acquire an airfield: "this society is going to stand for something tangible, practical, and it proposes to secure experimental grounds as soon as possible where men who have been working on problems of aeronautics will be enabled to try out their machines".

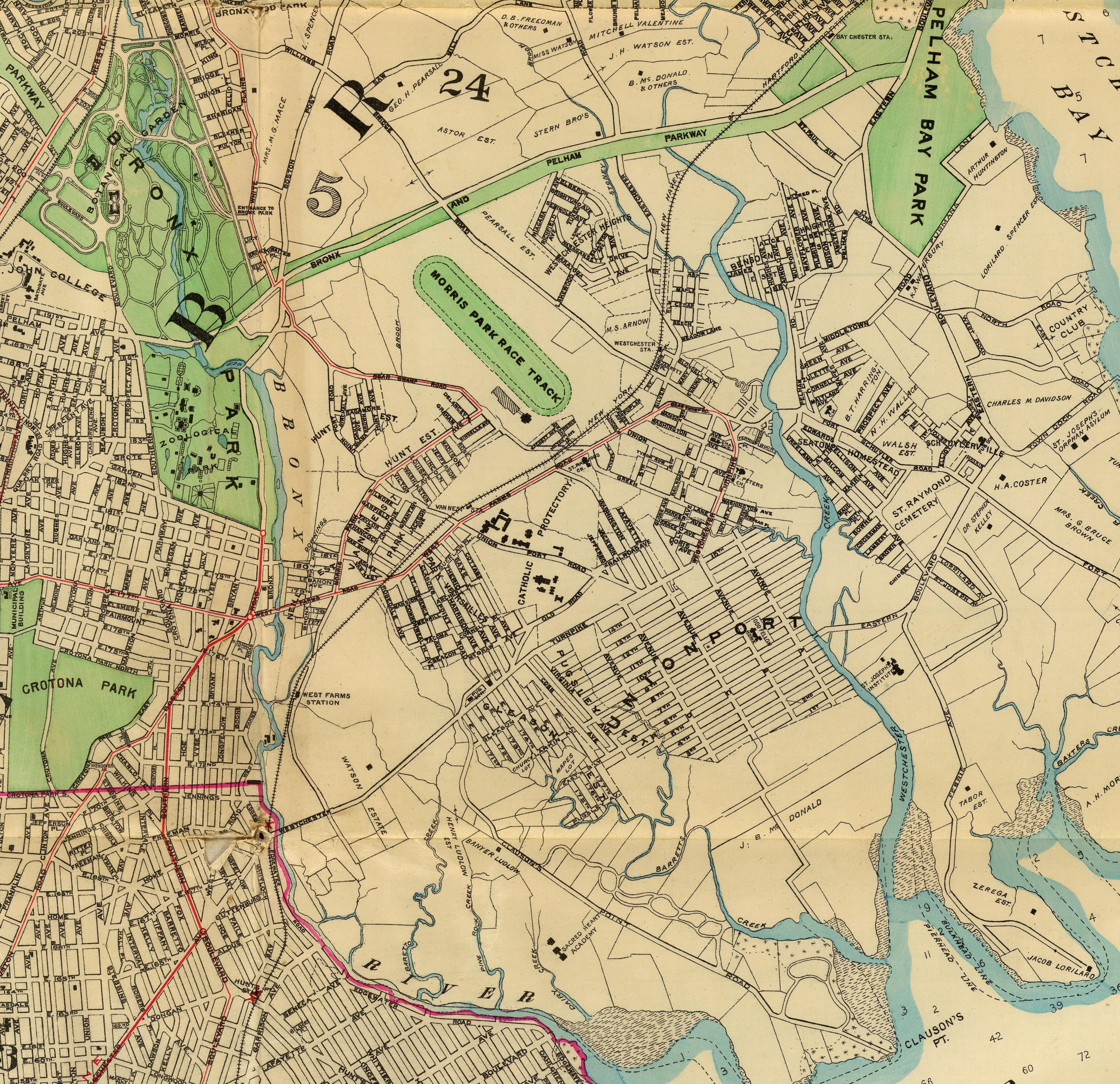
Location of the Morris Park Race Track on a 1900 map. Bear Swamp Road is Bronxdale Avenue, and West Farms Road is Tremont Avenue on modern maps.

That summer, the Society examined several properties ranging from New Jersey to Long Island and ultimately selected the grounds of the former Morris Park Racecourse as the most suitable location. The racecourse had closed in 1904, after which the 372-acre (151 ha) property was used for automobile and motorcycle racing for a few years. The site was conveniently located near the recently opened West Farms Square subway station and a trolley stop, as well as a range of cafés and residences available at relatively low rents. Proximity to public transportation was considered essential, as it made the field accessible to all experimenters, not only the affluent. The location provided open spaces on level ground, several existing buildings which could be repurposed as workshops, and a larger building with well-tended landscaping to use as a clubhouse.

Morris Park Aerodrome (occasionally called the Morris Park Volery) was made available to members for the first time on the weekend of August 29 and 30, 1908. It was already known that the land was destined for residential development but a short-term lease was signed on or about August 31, running through December 31, 1909. By the following week, fences adjacent to the track were being removed to provide a clear, straight path of at least 0.62 miles (1.00 km); locations were being considered for the construction of a machine shop; and plans were underway for an exhibition at which "Freak machines will have a chance to show what they can do as well as the more orthodox types." A schedule of educational lectures was soon organized; these were presented in the clubhouse for the benefit of experimenters who were working on projects at the field.

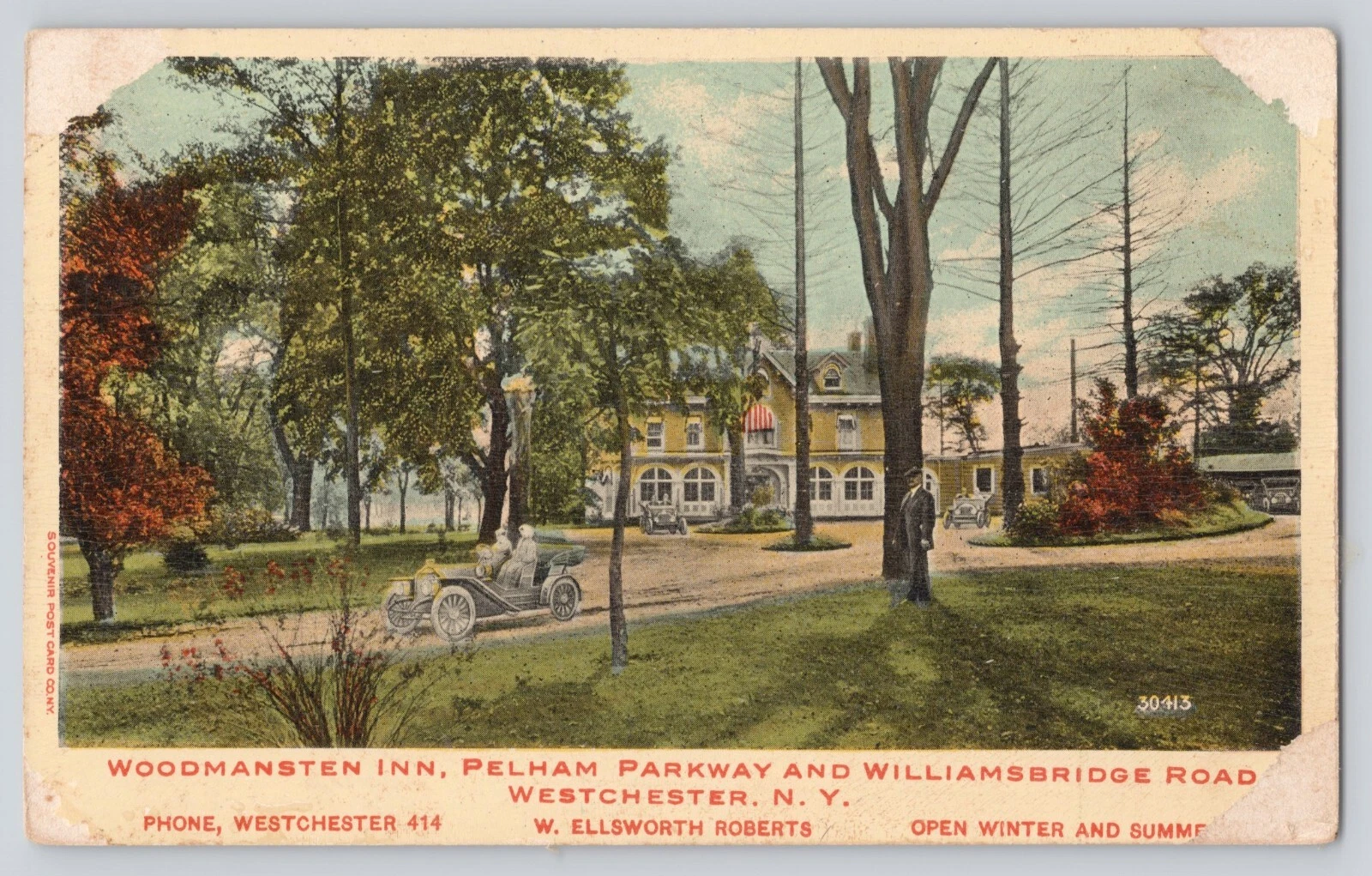
The Woodmansten Inn

The Woodmansten Inn, directly across Williams Bridge Road from the race track, provided a restaurant and sleeping facilities; an advertisement in the 1908 exhibition program offered dinner with wine for $3.00 (equivalent to $74 in 2024). The Inn had previously been a mansion on the estate of the Pearsall family and had been purchased in 1902 by the Westchester Racing Association as part of an unsuccessful attempt to increase attendance at the track. Tandy described it in his 1910 retrospective as "one of the best and most fashionable hotels of the city". The Woodmansten property was acquired by New York City in 1949 and is now the site of the Loretto Playground.

== Field ==
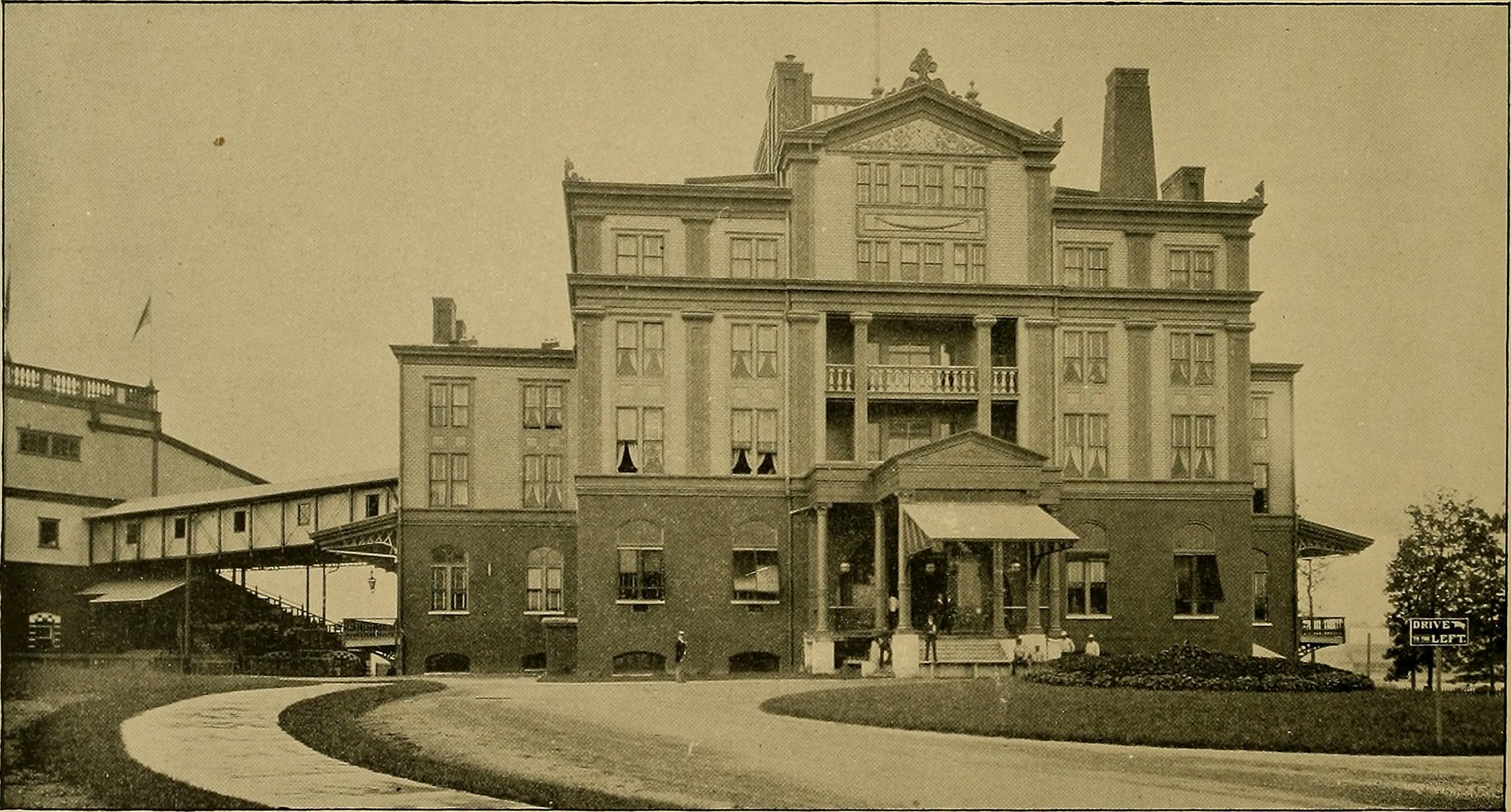
Morris Park Clubhouse in 1898

Morris Park was the first flying field in the United States, although by the end of 1909, the aviation publication All the World's Airships by Fred Jane listed it as one of eight such facilities in the country. The primary purpose of the field was the construction of aircraft, although it was also used for flight instruction, hosting Albert Triaca's International School of Aeronautics. Within the first 12 months of operation, 24 full-sized heavier-than-air airplanes were constructed on the field, plus an assortment of gliders, airships, and a large number of scale models. Almost 25% of the Society membership held aircraft patents or were directly involved in the construction of aircraft at the field.

Lacking any hill high enough from which to launch a glider, the Society built two facilities for assisting in glider launches. The first was a catapult. The second was a larger structure of wooden construction, which was erected without first obtaining a building permit. After a glider spent an entire day atop the structure waiting for winds favorable for launching, city officials declared that the structure was a residence, and since it lacked both plumbing and a fire escape, condemned it, compelling it to be torn down.

Many of the aircraft built at Morris Park were failures, with aviation historians taking a pessimistic view of the members' skills. Preston Bassett described the Aeronautical Society as "a group of enthusiastic young men in New York City, all with plans for building their own machines [whose] enthusiasm far outran their ability to perform". Paul Glenshaw wrote, "The group could boast of few successes. Descriptions of the members' experiments included words like tree and fence, coupled with plunged and smashed."

== 1908 exhibition ==
On October 18, 1908, the first exhibition of the Society was announced for November 3 to coincide with Election Day. There were plans for two airplanes from the Aerial Experiment Association—June Bug and Silver Dart—to compete, a five-mile dirigible race, kites, and gliders; the kite contest was open to public school students with no entry fee. There were plans for one-, five-, and ten-mile motorcycle races sponsored by the Federation of American Motorcyclists and for the U.S. Weather Bureau to demonstrate the use of kites and captive balloons to collect atmospheric data. Lillian Todd, the only female member of the Society, was expected to show a "large model airplane" of her own design.

Admission to the exhibition was $0.50 (equivalent to $18 in 2025), with a five-cent subway ride from the heart of Manhattan taking 40 minutes. An estimated 20,000 spectators showed up, far exceeding expectations. Although several hundred people had volunteered to act as marshals (equipped with badges and sticks), a large number of people swarmed past the gate with only about 3,500 people having paid their admission fee. Tandy wrote that in the years since the race track had been in use, the fences had deteriorated and that "The payment for admission proved a matter of almost quixotic courtesy." In attendance was Grover Loening from the Columbia University Aero Club, which had just been formed the previous day. Loening would go on to earn in 1910 the first degree in aeronautical engineering issued by an American university.

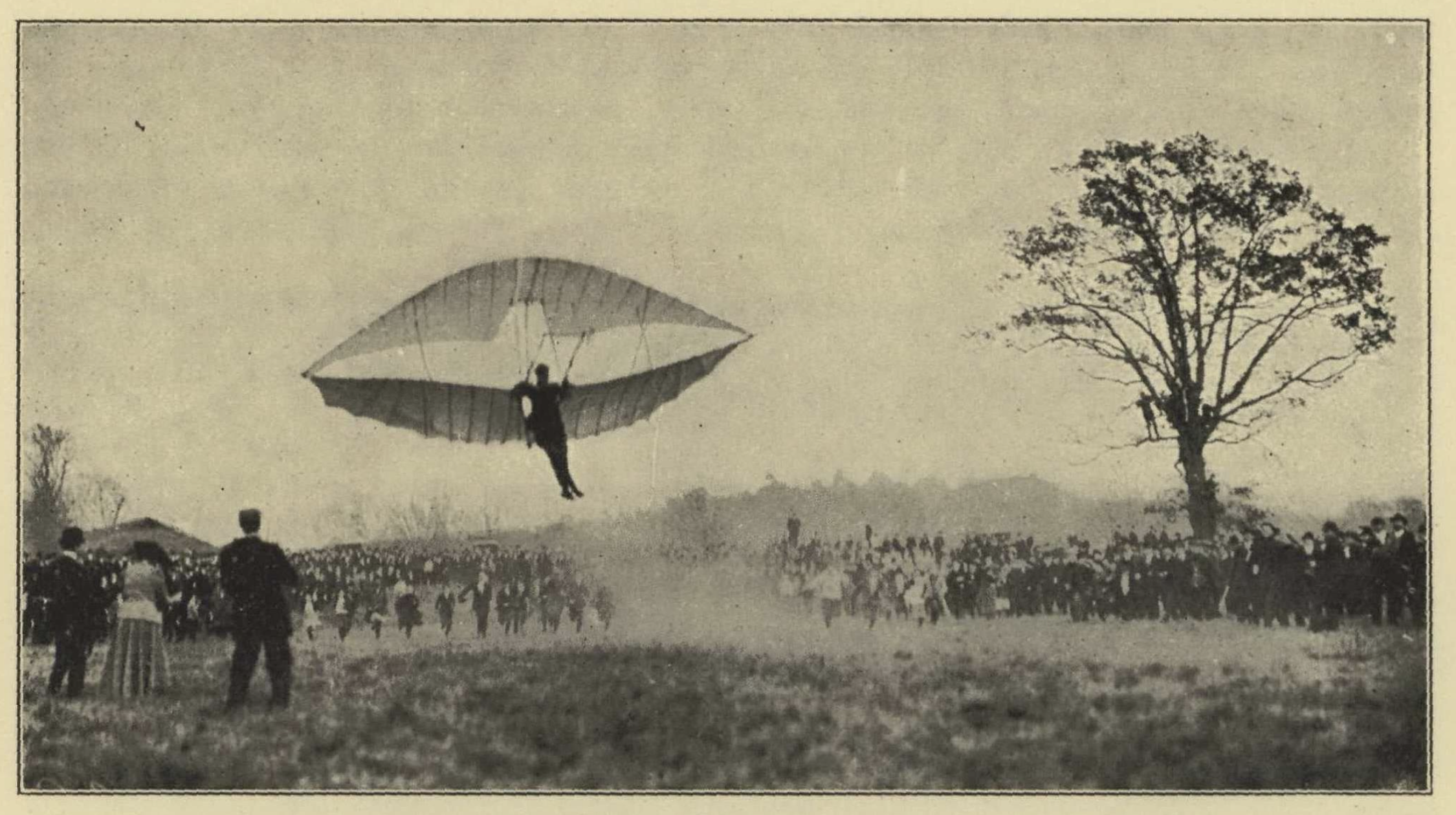
Lesh in the air at the 1908 exhibition

Sixteen-year-old glider pilot Laurence J. Lesh was the highlight of the exhibition. A protégé of aviation pioneer Octave Chanute, Lesh was the first known aviator in Canada, having built and flown horse-drawn gliders as early as 1907 when he was fourteen years old. He became known for a record-setting 24-minute, 6.2-mile (10.0 km) flight towed by a motor boat on the St. Lawrence River.

Lesh broke his ankle when he crashed during his third flight of the day after reaching a maximum altitude of 70 feet (21 m) and traveling about 200 feet (61 m). One account attributed the cause of the crash to inexperience flying this model of glider which lacked the rudder used on his earlier designs. Another account blamed the crowd which got in his way while attempting to land. In any case, the injuries sustained in the crash sent Lesh to the hospital and took a year of rehabilitative therapy to fully recover.

The glider had been launched by rope tow behind a 1907 Thomas Flyer driven by Montague Roberts, one of the drivers for the team who had won the 1908 New York to Paris Race in that car. Montague had competed in a 1907 24-hour race held at Morris Park when it was used for automobile racing. Previous launch attempts on the day of the exhibition had used a tow horse; out of six tries, only two got off the ground, reaching an altitude of about 20 feet (6.1 m). Lesh had also planned to show a large box kite that day.

=== Wind wagon races ===
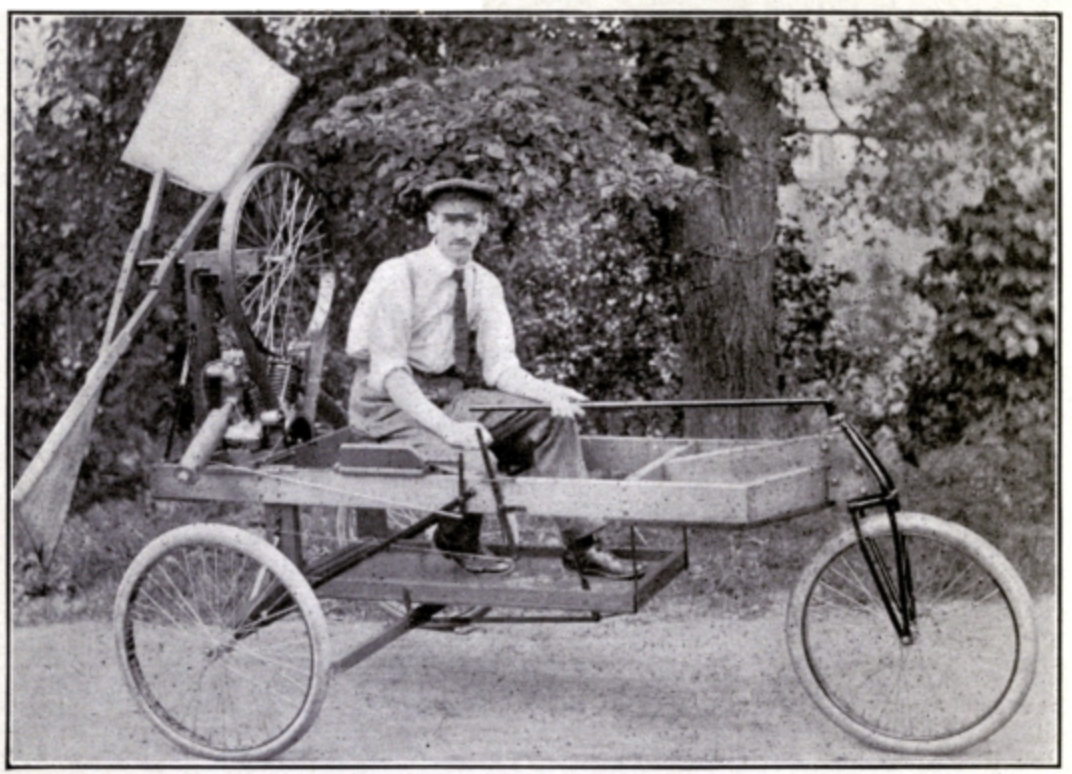
Glenn Curtiss on a wind wagon in 1904 (location unknown)

The exhibition included a contest for wheeled ground vehicles driven by propeller thrust, known as wind wagons. The New York Times described one of these as resembling "a huge tricycle with a propeller eight feet long in front and a gasoline motor behind". Inventors scheduled to show their wagons included astronomer William Pickering, aviation pioneer Glenn Curtiss, W. A. Custard, and Julian P. Thomas. According to Curtiss, the purpose of the wind wagon was to test the power of motors and the efficiency of propellers but it had no commercial value.

Thomas's machine was wrecked two days before the exhibition when he crashed during a practice run while trying to avoid a motorcycle. About 40 motorcyclists were using the track to prepare for a race scheduled for exhibition day; Thomas believed they had already cleared the track and entered the course at high speed. He sustained severe injuries that spectators, including Thomas's wife and son, thought to be fatal. However, after several minutes of unconsciousness, he opened his eyes, asked for a cigarette, and refused to be taken to a hospital. While recuperating at home, Thomas requested that the machine be repaired so another driver could use it during the exhibition.

== Retrospective ==
Two weeks after the 1908 exhibition, Lee Burridge spoke at the November 2 annual meeting of the Aero Club, reflecting on the schism which led to the founding of the Aeronautical Society. He complained of the "apathy of the Aero Club" when, after he had identified Morris Park as a potential site, they failed to act on the opportunity. Augustus Post, secretary of the Aero Club, replied that doing so would have split the membership into two classes, to which he was opposed. Post added that the club was still seeking to "secure extensive grounds for motor ballooning and aeroplaning, with hydrogen gas facilities, machine shops, and suitable buildings for storage, within easy distance of the city".

Members of the opposition group who had split off to form the new Society acknowledged that, although Morris Park was too small, it would serve as a temporary site while they continued to seek a larger facility. A motion authorizing the Aero Club to collaborate with the Aeronautical Society in a joint search for a location was discussed but did not pass.

== 1909 exhibition ==
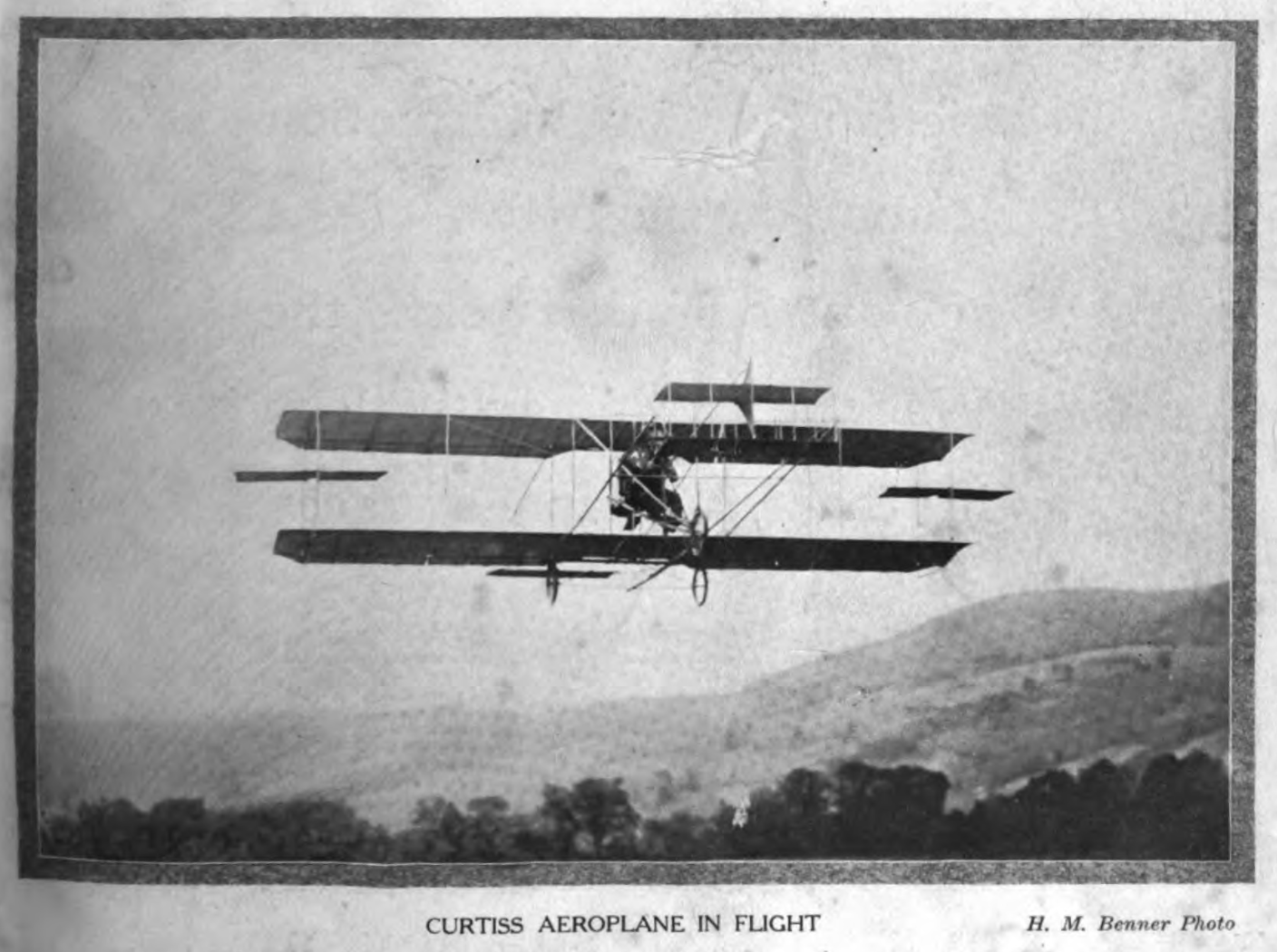
The Golden Flyer at Morris Park, 1909

A second annual exhibition was held on June 26, 1909, with 2,000 people in attendance on a day with ideal flying weather but with near-record high temperatures. The low attendance left the Society with a $5,000 (equivalent to $120,000 in 2024) deficit.

=== Glenn Curtiss ===
The highlight of the event was a series of flights by Curtiss in a biplane named Golden Flyer which the Society had purchased from Curtiss and his partner Augustus Herring for $5,000. This set a number of records; the flights themselves were the first airplane flights ever taken over New York City, the purchase was the first sale to a civilian owner, and the Herring-Curtiss Company was the first airplane manufacturing company in the country. The terms of the sale included training for two pilots (Charles Willard and Alexander Williams), and an obligation for Curtiss to fly it at the exhibition. The Curtiss design used ailerons for roll control instead of the wing warping system employed by the Wright brothers, making the airplane more stable and more maneuverable.

That the defendant, alleging to be formed for the purpose of promoting aerial flying, procured the Herring-Curtiss Company and one Glenn H. Curtiss, personally, both of Hammondsport, N.Y., to make the flying machines herein complained of and deliver them to the defendant, under whose auspices the said Glenn H. Curtiss is giving public exhibition flights with the said infringing flying machines within the jurisdiction of this court; that the defendant has purchased such machines from one or both of said parties, and has charged the public for admission to said exhibition flights, receiving large sums in gate, or ticket, money.

— Quote from the Wright brothers' patent infringement suit

The flight of the Golden Flyer created legal controversy when two months later the Wright brothers filed a patent infringement suit against the Aeronautical Society in the United States circuit court, claiming infringement of their 1906 patent. The suit (one of many the Wrights eventually filed against competitors) demanded that the Society be permanently enjoined from further infringement, disclose how much money had been made from the exhibitions, and turn over for destruction all "machinery, flying machines, and parts thereof" which infringed the patents.

The first flight was a straight-line flight covering 300 yards (270 m), averaging 30 feet (9.1 m) in altitude. The Brooklyn Eagle noted that "his adjustment of his controls to uneven wind currents was absolutely accurate". The remainder of the flights took place after twilight, having been delayed by puffy winds, with the event being forced to conclude as darkness fell. The rough ground at the field was a complicating factor, making landings difficult. One flight lasted 1 minute 45 2/5 seconds, completing either three-quarters or a full lap (sources differ) around the 1-mile (1.6 km) track at an altitude of 20 feet (6.1 m), flying between trees along the backstretch and sometimes reaching as high as 60 feet (18 m). The aircraft was reported as "always under perfect control". This flight was the first time Curtiss had completed a flight around a circular course, although Henri Farman and the Wright Brothers had both already accomplished this feat.

=== William Martin ===
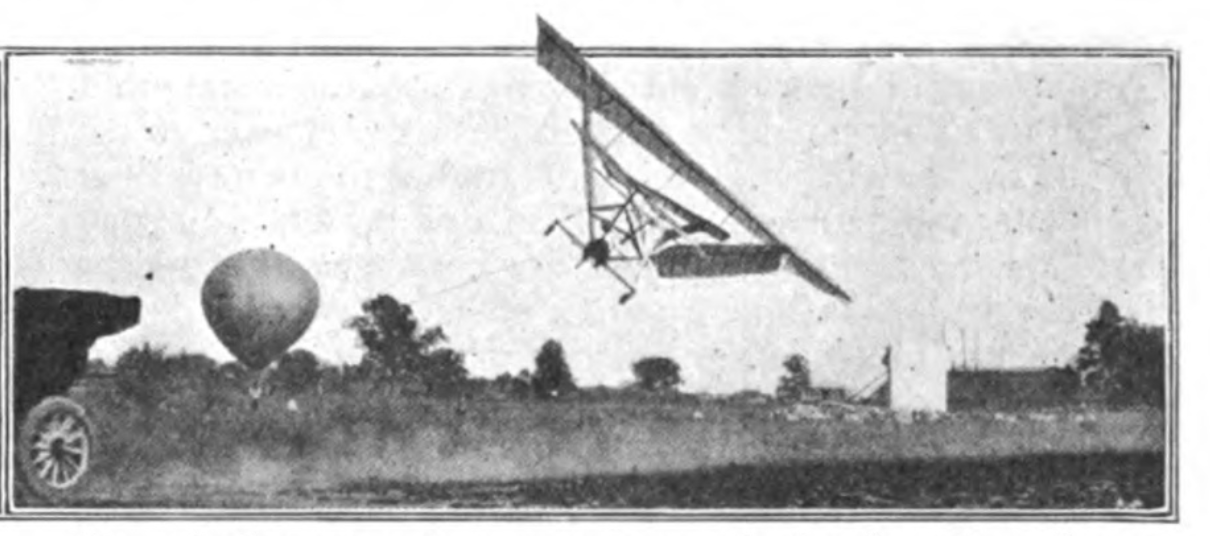
William Martin's glider at Morris Park

William H. Martin flew a glider towed by an automobile driven by his wife. He had only gone about 50 yards (46 m) when the tow rope broke and the glider crashed; he suffered minor injuries but the aircraft was severely damaged. The safety of the craft was demonstrated on September 21 when Martin's eight-year-old granddaughter, Blanche, made several solo flights, becoming the youngest person to make a flight in a heavier-than-air craft.

Martin's glider had originally been constructed on his farm in Canton, Ohio. The V-shaped lower wings added stability as a result of the dihedral effect, where the upward slant of a wing makes any sideslipping of the aircraft inherently produce a force correcting the deviation. It first flew on January 12, 1909, launched from the top of a hill and towed by Martin's horse named Old Billy. The first flight covered 200 feet (61 m) reaching a maximum altitude of 25 feet (7.6 m). Martin brought the glider to Morris Park in May 1909, where it continued to make demonstration flights, being pulled around the track at 30 miles per hour (48 km/h) behind an automobile with a 150 ft (46 m) tow rope, and reaching altitudes as high as 75 feet (23 m).

The UK-based Flight magazine called the Martin glider demonstration the most notable event of the day, after Curtiss's flight. They took a negative view, however, of Martin's craft, calling it an "example of the foolhardiness of tests of this character" and writing that "there is little or nothing to be learned through being towed behind a car in this manner ... the conditions do not represent the problems of flight in the least". The magazine described the flight as a "short and erratic aerial journey", noting that the presence of the tow rope restricted operation of the aircraft and negatively affected its stability.

=== Additional exhibits ===
Frederick Schneider demonstrated a motor-driven catapult-assisted airplane of his own construction, named The Brooklyn. The craft failed to get off the ground due to a rusty launching rail and too little weight loaded into the catapult, only managing to slide along the grass for 100 feet (30 m). There were parachute jumps from hot air balloons, with Paul Bloomfield jumping from 1,000 feet (300 m), and Mary Hunter from an altitude reported only as "far higher" than Bloomfield's. One of the less serious events was a "balloonatic race". This consisted of a person attempting to run while being supported by a lighter-than-air balloon with just enough buoyancy to support the person's weight.

== The Fledglings ==
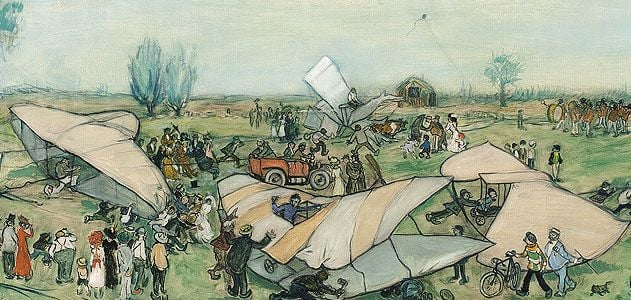
Detail from The Fledglings

In attendance at the 1908 exhibition was painter Rudolph Dirks, better known as the cartoonist who drew The Katzenjammer Kids. His experiences at the show gave Dirks an idea for a painting which would focus more on the people in the crowd than on the machines, and he began recording what he was seeing in rough pencil sketches. That evening, Dirks quickly returned to his studio in Manhattan where he began to paint. Not having any prepared canvas on hand and wishing to begin work quickly so as not to let his memories of the event fade, he repurposed a window shade to use as a canvas.

The resulting oil-on-linen painting, titled The Fledglings, is considered by aviation historian Tom Crouch to be "the earliest serious artistic reaction to the dawn of the air age". It was donated by Dirks' son to the National Air and Space Museum where, as of 2025, it is on display in the Early Flight exhibit.

== Other activities ==
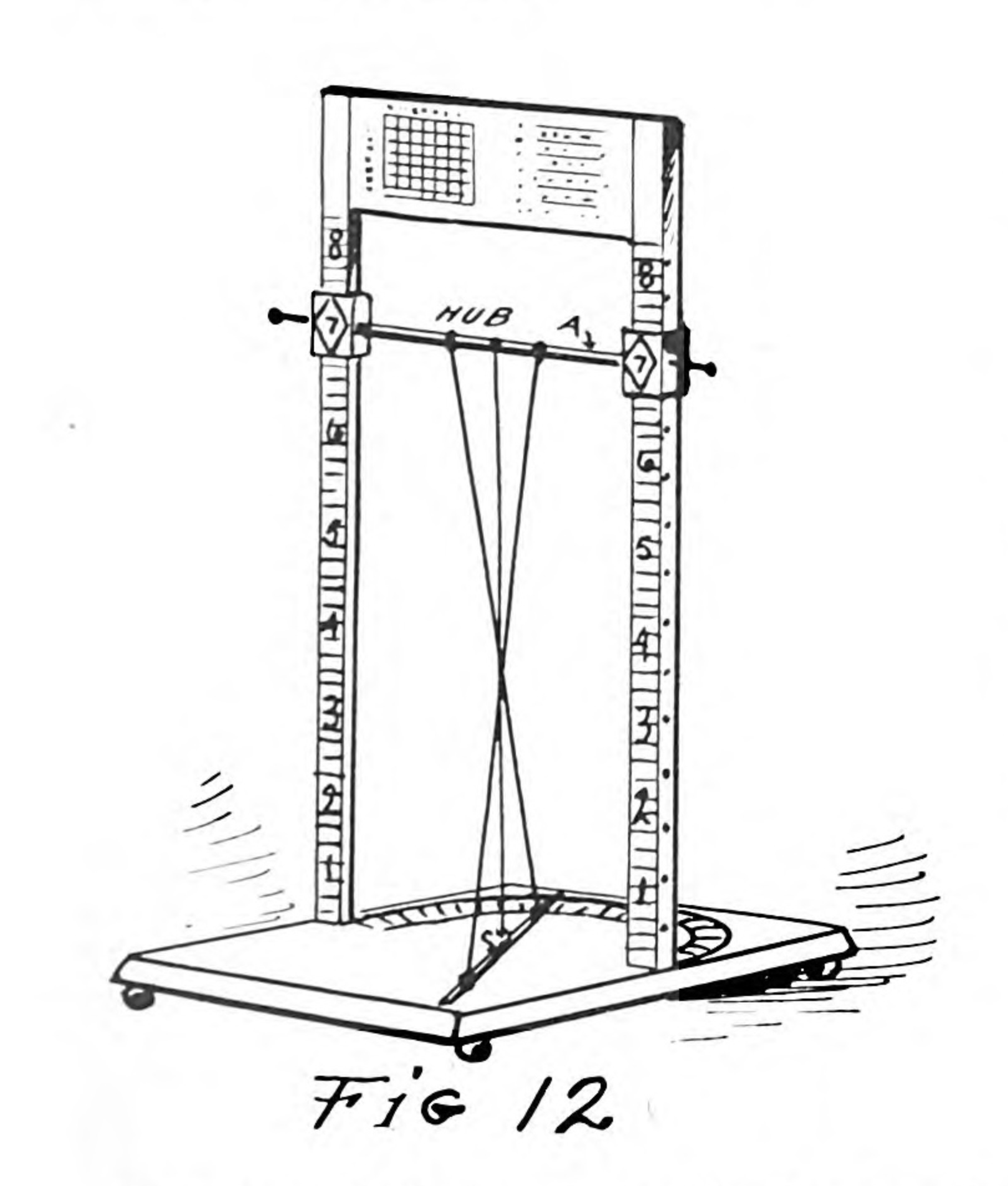
Device for laying out a propeller

The March 1909 issue of Aeronautics included a paper by R. W. Jamieson describing a device used to lay out a screw propeller for an airplane. The exact form of a propeller is a complex three-dimensional shape which depends on blade diameter and rotational speed, as well as the aircraft's intended forward speed, with blade pitch varying continuously from the hub to the tip of each blade. The laying out process computes the required pitch profile and transfers these computations to a blank piece of material so it can be shaped. Jamieson described this process in a talk to the Society; the device itself was presented to the Society and installed at the Morris Park Aerodrome for use by the Society's members.

A report in the April 1909 issue of Aeronautics described new aircraft (referred to as "machines") that were being planned or under construction by at least twenty members of the Society and would be exhibited at Morris Park in the spring of that year. The report noted that celebrity actress Anna Held christened the first airplane constructed entirely at Morris Park. The magazine had previously observed that Americans often named their aircraft, contrary to the European habit of numbering them: "Flying machines have a something that is akin to a personality, and giving them names, even if it does not help us to realize their individuality, and perhaps it may, at least it helps in a curiously subtle way to popularize them."

=== Wilbur Kimball ===
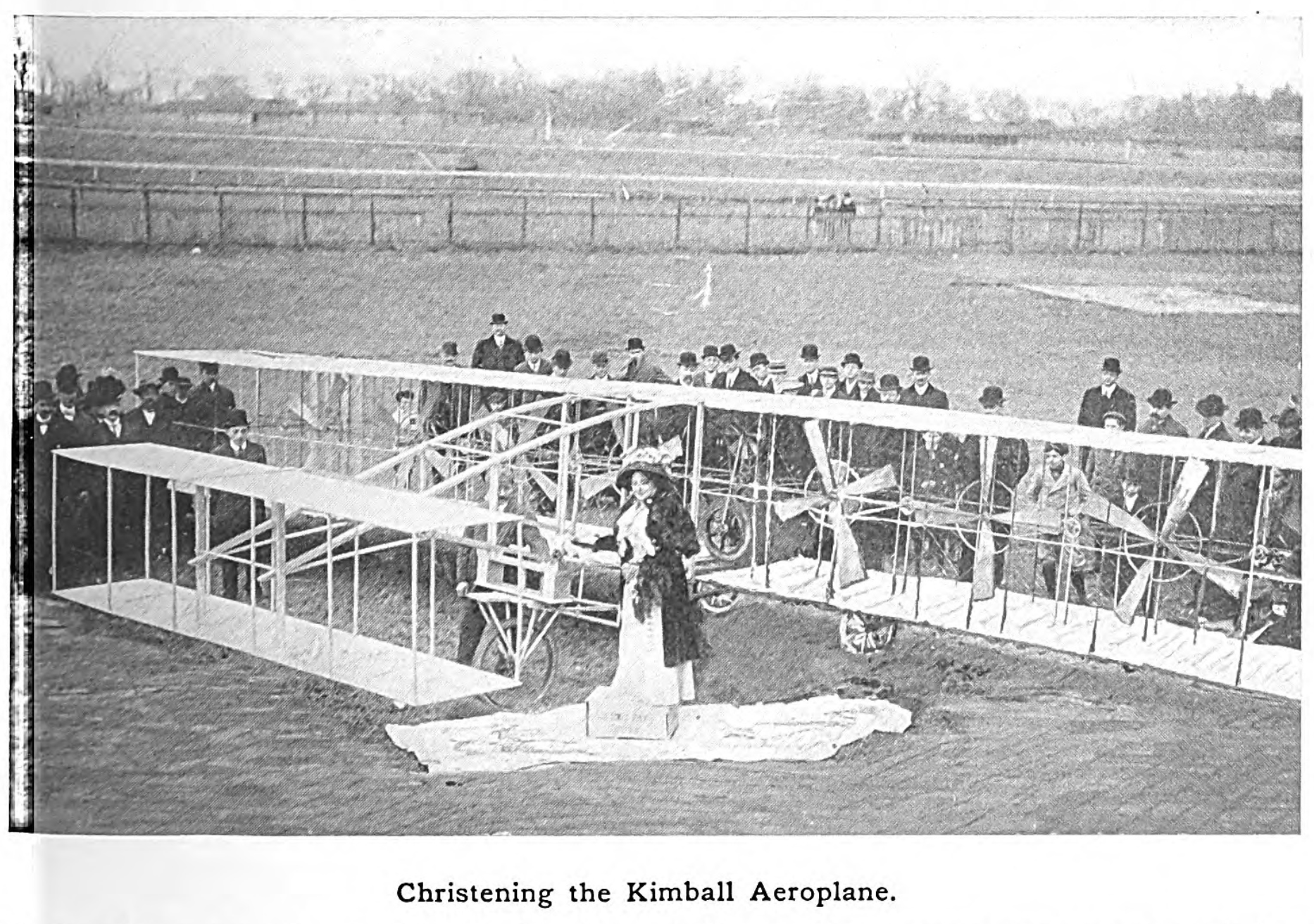
Anna Held christening the N.Y. No. 1 at Morris Park

Wilbur Ravel Kimball's design was a 42-foot (13 m) wingspan biplane with eight four-bladed low-pitch propellers on ball-bearing mounts driven by a 50 horsepower (37 kW) four-cylinder two-stroke engine. Lateral control was achieved by a system similar to that used by J. Neale: four movable panels set vertically between the two wings (compared to two used by Neale). In addition to this airplane, Kimball was also working on another design for William H. Butler which would utilize a 100 horsepower (75 kW) engine. Kimball's airplane was christened on March 14 by Anna Held as the N. Y. No. 1; the ceremony was believed to be the first time an airplane had ever been christened.

On December 4, 1909, a shed containing four of Kimball's airplanes was destroyed by fire. The value of the airplanes was estimated at $25,000 (equivalent to $620,000 in 2024).

=== Frederick Schneider ===
In December 1908, a new airplane arrived at Morris Park: a biplane under construction by Frederick Schneider, (Note: Spelled as Shneider or Schneider in different sources) who had begun construction at his home in Brooklyn, disassembled it there, delivered it to Morris Park on Christmas Day, and had it reassembled by the 29th of December. The plane had a 30-foot (9.1 m) wingspan and with a pilot aboard weighed 630 pounds (290 kg) with a main wing loading of 1.7 pounds per square foot (8.3 kg/m^{2}). A 36 horsepower (27 kW) five-cylinder air-cooled engine drove three adjustable-pitch propellers.

=== Stanley Beach and Charles Willard ===
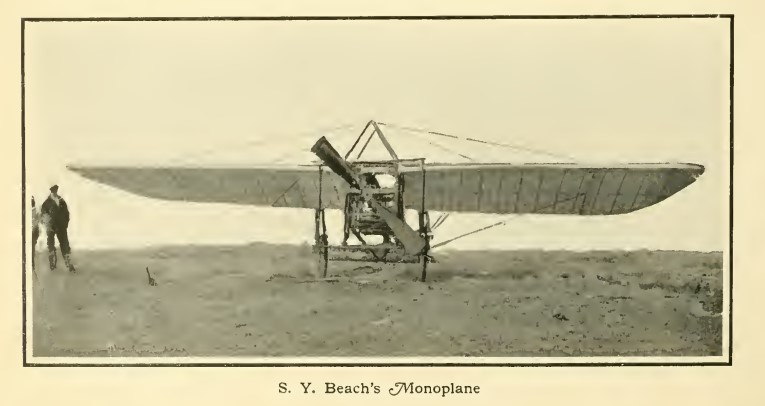
Beach-Willard Monoplane

Stanley Beach and Charles Willard constructed a monoplane at Morris Park patterned after those built by Bleriot and Antoinette. Completed on May 31, 1909, it was reported to be the first monoplane flown in the United States. Beach claimed it was faster than either the Wright or Curtiss airplanes, and just as stable. He intended to show it at the Hudson-Fulton Celebration, and fly it from New York to Albany.

The airplane had a 50 horsepower (37 kW) four-cylinder water-cooled engine and a wing loading of 2-1/2 lbs per square foot. The engine ran at 1000 RPM, driving a nine-foot propeller at 500 RPM via a chain running over a 2:1 reduction sprocket. During early testing, the propeller turning at 300 RPM developed 325 pounds (147 kg) of thrust. A July 1909 report in Aeronautics gives a wingspan of 38 ft (11.6 m) and a weight of 750 pounds (340 kg) including the pilot. A newspaper report in October, however, said it had a 41 ft (12.5 m) wingspan, weighed 1,100 pounds (500 kg) without the pilot, and was equipped with inflatable pontoons for water landings.

=== Henry Walden ===
In July 1908, 24-year-old Henry W. Walden, a New York City dentist and aviation enthusiast, read about the Aeronautics Society. He joined in September of that year and began designing and building airplanes at Morris Park, despite a lack of training in aerodynamics. His first design, a tandem biplane called the Walden I, was predicated on his belief that earlier designs lacked sufficient wing area. Ready for flight testing in early spring 1909, it used an automobile engine supplied to him by the Society. The 15 horsepower (11 kW) 500 lb (230 kg) engine proved unsuitable and he abandoned the design. His second effort, the Walden II, was completed in late May. This also failed to get off the ground. Walden attributed the failure to insufficient wing area and extended the wingspan by 2 feet (0.61 m) on each side, but it was destroyed in a windstorm before another attempt at flight could be undertaken.

Encouraged by watching Glenn Curtiss's flights at the June 1909 exhibition, Walden began work on the Walden III, which he decided needed to be smaller and less complicated than his previous two. He designed a monoplane, purchasing a three-cylinder Anzani engine capable of producing 25–30 horsepower (19–22 kW). The wing was designed in a way which made it possible to add additional panels to increase the wing area if needed. To expedite construction, Walden hired two assistants to work on the plane, and another dentist to take over most of his practice. The plane was completed in late November, but by that time the Society's lease was running out and the plane was moved to Mineola, Long Island, where it was first test-flown on December 9.

=== American Eagle ===
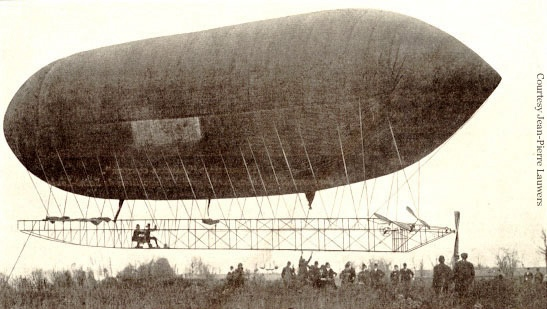
American Eagle at Morris Park, 1909

In February 1908, aviator Joel T. Rice (with financial backing from John Andrew Riggs) formed the Hot Springs Airship Company in Hot Springs, Arkansas whereupon they started work on a dirigible, over 50-foot (15 m) long, named The Arkansas Traveler. In 1909, Rice and Riggs (accompanied by Rice's sons Roy and Alphonson) moved the ship to New York where they showed it at the Hudson–Fulton Celebration.

They then began work at Morris Park on a larger ship, The American Eagle. At the time, this was the largest steel-framed airship in the country. The name was unpopular with New Yorkers, leading to the newspapers of the time referring to it as The Arkansas Traveler, the same name as the previous ship (aviation author Don Dwiggins, however, writes that the term "Arkansas travelers" actually refers to Rice and Riggs). Plans were being made for the Seeing New York company to use the ship for sightseeing tours over New York City.

Riggs became a member of the Aeronautical Society on August 5, 1909 and put up a large tent at Morris Park to use as a hangar. Soon after, Rice and Riggs had a falling out. Riggs, who owned a company called the Lopez Medicine Company, painted "LOPEZ" in large block letters on both sides of the American Eagle's gas bag. Rice objected to this and threatened to destroy the ship if the advertisement was not removed. Riggs summoned his brothers Steve and Frank, and his son E. Marion, to New York and stationed them as guards around the ship. Riggs was eventually convinced to remove the advertisement, but before he could do so, Rice, evading the guards, had painted over it with house paint which damaged the fabric, necessitating repairs.

The American Eagle had a 100-foot (30 m) envelope containing 33,000 cubic feet (930 m^{3}) of gas with an 80-foot (24 m) compartment that provided seating for 15 passengers. Instead of the usual rudder, she used vectored thrust: a large propeller mounted so that, in addition to providing propulsion, it could pivot left and right for lateral control. Two smaller propellers could be pivoted up and down for vertical control, an arrangement patented by Rice in 1904. The ship included a system that captured and reused hydrogen gas leaked from the envelope.

The ship was intended to be used for cross-country flights, with the initial trip scheduled from New York to Washington, D.C. Stops along the way were planned at 50–75-mile (80–121 km) intervals to show off the ship. Riggs said that the trip was intended "to demonstrate the practical uses of a properly equipped dirigible balloon for long-continued cross-country travel". The flight, however, never happened. Immediately after being launched, the horizontal planes (movable surfaces used to adjust the up-and-down attitude of the aircraft) accidentally hit and destroyed the propellers, making it impossible to control the ship. A gale-force storm two days later caused irreparable damage to the gas envelope.

Riggs, having spent almost $50,000 (equivalent to $1,200,000 in 2024), put the remnants of the airship in storage and went back to Arkansas. Rice, meanwhile, had taken the tools, engine, and other parts, hoping to use these to pressure Riggs into settling a debt for his share of the business. In 1910, Riggs sued Rice to obtain clear right to the patents and the return of the parts that Rice had in his possession. Riggs was successful in the first suit, but not the second.

== Post-aerodrome era ==
Publicity booklet for Morris Park Race Track final auction

Morris Park proved to be too small to serve the needs of the Aeronautical Society. After surveying the available locations near New York City, Glenn Curtiss recommended moving to the Hempstead Plains Aerodrome (later renamed Roosevelt Field), near Mineola, Long Island. On May 9 (another source says April 10), 1910, a wind-blown fire destroyed the Morris Park property. The Van Nest Hose Company responded, stopping trains on the New Haven Railroad for several hours because they needed to lay their hoses across the rails. Despite their efforts, the fire burned all afternoon, consuming the race track and several nearby buildings. The property was later subdivided into building lots.

In the 1920s, there were efforts to create a new airport about 2 miles (3.2 km) to the northeast, in a marshy area near the Hutchinson River, which later became the site of Freedomland U.S.A. and, subsequently, of Co-op City. The Bronx Chamber of Commerce made one unsuccessful attempt in 1927. Another effort, by Curtiss-Wright in 1929, progressed as far as announcing a groundbreaking date but failed when the stock market crashed in October of that year.
