= Aeronautical Society of New York =

Professional society for the advancement of aviation

The Aeronautical Society of New York (sometimes called the Aeronautic Society of New York) was a society formed in 1908 to advance the development of aviation. It was an outgrowth of the Aero Club of America, formed by a group of club members who were dissatisfied with the club's efforts to promote the construction of experimental airplanes. Founding members included Lee Burridge, Albert Triaca, Willard Kimball, Roger Whitman, William Hammer, Leo Stevens, Daniel Brine, and Stanley Beach.

According to society chronicler Edward Tandy, the Society "was the first organization the world formed for the practical pursuit of the problem of mechanical flight by man", as well as the first to have grounds to fly out of, and the first to give public exhibitions. One of the first official acts of the new Society was to lease the 372-acre (151 ha) property of the defunct Morris Park Racetrack in what is now the Bronx, New York, setting it up as the Morris Park Aerodrome.
