= Julian P. Thomas =

American physician and aviator (died 1932)

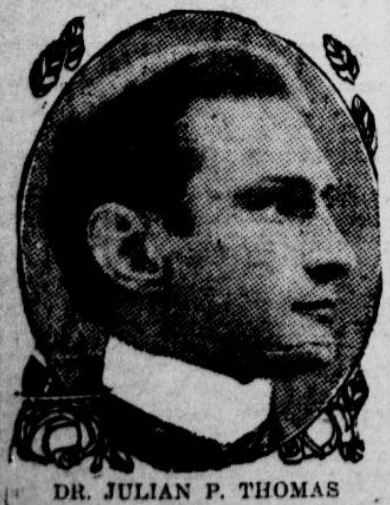

Julian P. Thomas (died May 10, 1932) was an American balloonist and medical doctor in the early 20th century. As a balloonist, he participated in long-distance flights with his wife, his son, and fellow aviator Roy Knabenshue. As a doctor, he became involved in a number of questionable ventures involving fad diets which resulted in legal issues.

== Personal life ==
Thomas's father, James Jefferson Thomas, was a cavalry officer in the Confederate army. His mother, Ella Gertrude Clanton Thomas is more well known, having kept a journal of her life experiences for 41 years. She considered herself a feminist and a suffragist. Julian spent the early part of his life in Georgia, near Augusta and Atlanta.

Thomas studied at the Medical College of Georgia, earning his medical degree there. He had a son, Odin, born c. 1899.

Thomas died on May 10, 1932, in Atlanta, Georgia.

== Ballooning ==
As a young man, Thomas became interested in bronco riding, racing cars and aviation. He experimented with models of lighter-than-air balloons (both hot-air and gas) as well as aeroplanes. This led to his purchase of a full-sized balloon 60 feet (18 m) high with a diameter of 47 feet (14 m), holding 60,000 cubic feet (1,700 m^{3}) of gas. He used coal gas due to its decreased cost compared to hydrogen, even though it provided half the lifting power. A typical flight would carry two or three passengers plus 1,000 pounds (450 kg) of ballast in the form of sand bags.

Around 1905, Thomas met aviator and aeronautical engineer Roy Knabenshue. Thomas and Knabenshue completed a 225-mile (362 km) balloon trip in 1906, traveling from New York to Massachusetts, with an overnight stop in Noank, Connecticut.

On April 11, 1906, Thomas, accompanied by his wife and French aeronaut Charles Levee, completed a record flight of 60 miles (97 km) in three hours, travelling from Pittsfield to Springfield, Massachusetts. Mrs. Thomas kept a diary during the trip and brought along a camera which they used to take photographs of rivers, lakes, clouds, and each other while in flight. She described the experience when they climbed into a cloud as being able to see "nothing but microscopic rain", with "no noise, no sensation, no object in sight" and noted that they ate lunch at an altitude of 5,000 feet (1,500 m).

In June of that year, Thomas claimed to have broken the US records for both altitude and distance flown in a balloon by covering over 300 miles (480 km) between the Bronx and Otsego County, both in New York State, and reaching an altitude of 8,000 feet (2,400 m). In December, he published an article in The World's Work describing his experiences in balloons.

In 1908, Thomas was severely injured in an accident while operating a "wind wagon" (a tricycle with a propeller powered by a gasoline engine) in preparation for an aviation exhibition at the Morris Park Aerodrome. He crashed when trying to avoid a motorcyclist who was also using the track to prepare for the exhibition to be held two days later.

== Medical ventures ==
Thomas operated a mail-order natural foods company in New York City. In 1910, he was found guilty of mislabeling a type of bread he sold which he claimed was "an infallible cure for indigestion, gastritis, and other ills of the stomach". Thomas defended the bread, which is made from wheat without cooking, saying he hit upon the idea one day when he was suffering from indigestion and observed that his horses did well on a diet of raw food. In April 1914, he was arrested and charged with providing fraudulent medical advice by mail.
