= Diggins =

Diggins or Diggin may refer to:

== Places ==
- Diggins, Missouri

== People ==
- Bartholomew Diggins (1844–1917), American Civil War Navy sailor
- Ben Diggins (born 1979), American Major League Baseball player
- Brighton Diggins (1906–1971), Australian rules footballer
- Jay Diggins (born 1974), English musician
- Jessie Diggins (born 1991), American cross-country skier
- John Patrick Diggins (1935–2009), American history professor
- Paul Diggin (born 1985), British rugby player
- Skylar Diggins (born 1990), American basketball player

== See also ==
- Dwiggins, a surname
