= Morris Park Racecourse =

Horse racing course in the Bronx, New York

Coordinates: 40°51′00″N 73°51′20″W

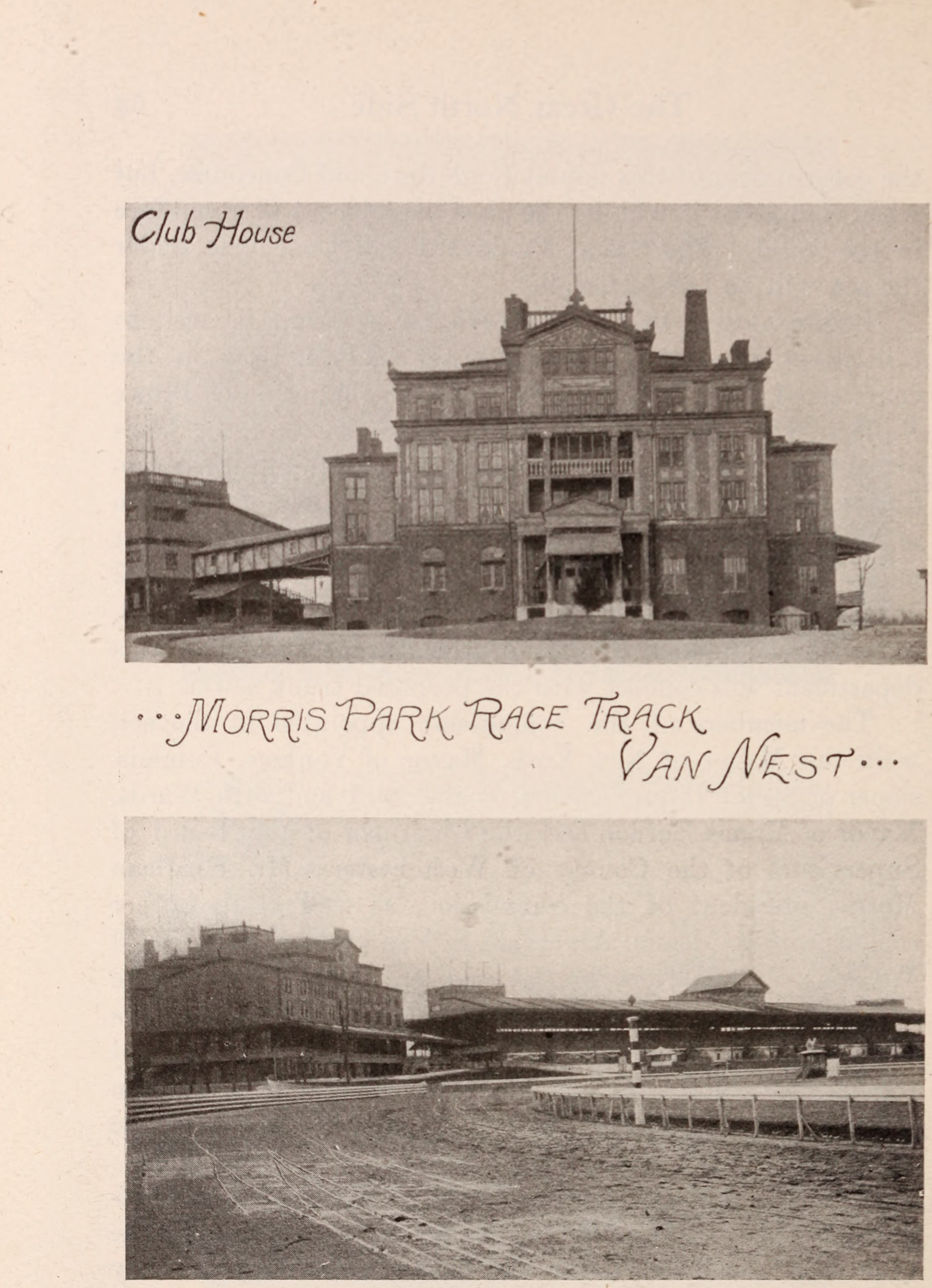
1897

Morris Park Racecourse was an American thoroughbred horse racing facility from 1889 to 1904. It was located in a part of Westchester County, New York that was annexed into the Bronx in 1895 and later developed as the neighborhood of Morris Park. The racecourse was the site of the Belmont Stakes from 1890 through 1904 as well as the Preakness Stakes in 1890.

== History ==
Morris Park Racecourse was conceived and built by majority shareholder John Albert Morris as a result of the planned closure of the nearby Jerome Park Racetrack, where racing ended in 1894 to make way for the Jerome Park Reservoir. Principal owner John Morris had extensive business interests in Louisiana and the prominent New York businessman and horseracing enthusiast Leonard W. Jerome served as the racecourse's president. African-American Racing Hall of Fame jockey Isaac Murphy rode on opening day at the new facility—August 20, 1889—and Morris Park was described as "the finest race track in the world." Accessible by horse and buggy, the New York, New Haven and Hartford Railroad added a short spur from its main line near the Van Nest station that brought racing fans directly to the new race track from the greater New York City area.

The track held the USA Cross Country Championships from 1890 to 1892 and 1897 to 1898.

On June 10, 1890, Morris Park Racecourse hosted both the Preakness and Belmont Stakes. While the Preakness Stakes was canceled for three years then restarted in 1894 at Gravesend Race Track on Coney Island, the Belmont Stakes was held at Morris Park until it moved to Belmont Park on Long Island in 1905. During this same period of 1890 through 1904, the Champagne Stakes and the Ladies Handicap were also raced here. The Metropolitan Handicap was inaugurated here in 1891 as was the Matron Stakes the following year.

A few days before he died in May 1895, John Morris leased the racecourse, with an option to purchase, to the Westchester Racing Association. Although the 1½ mile racecourse was modified to a one-mile circuit to allow for better spectator viewing, a lack of patronage by high society members meant the clubhouse was usually empty. By 1902, the decline in attendance resulted in the decision to close Morris Park Racecourse. The final day of races was held on October 15, 1904, and racing shifted to the new Belmont Park the following year.

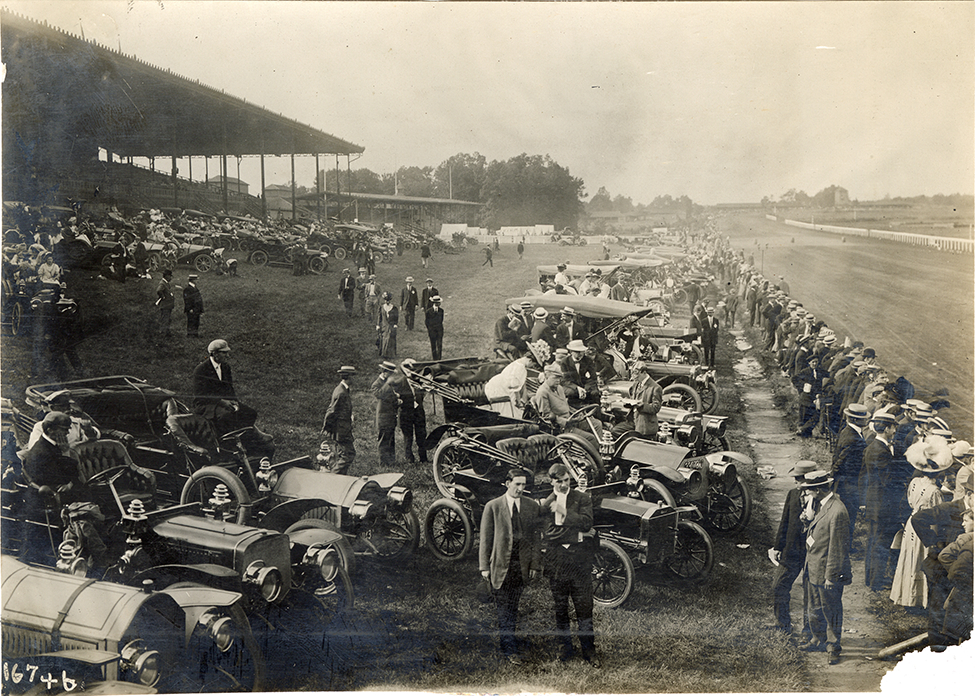
Auto racing at Morris Park, 1907

After its closure, the Morris Park Racecourse was used for automobile racing but a few years later the Morris heirs sold the property to real estate developers. The new owners ran into financial problems which resulted in the track being taken over by the City of New York in 1907. The city then leased it for two years to the Aeronautic Society of New York who used it as an aerodrome and hosted the first public air show on the grounds. In June 1909, Glenn H. Curtiss put on a flying exhibition at Morris Park.

On April 10, 1910 a fire ravaged much of the stables and nearby facilities. Three years later the property was auctioned off to developers who would subdivide the land into building lots. As late as 1921 the clubhouse was still intact when it was sold as part of a 14-lot package to a company who converted it for use as a factory to manufacture ornamental iron.

== Physical attributes ==
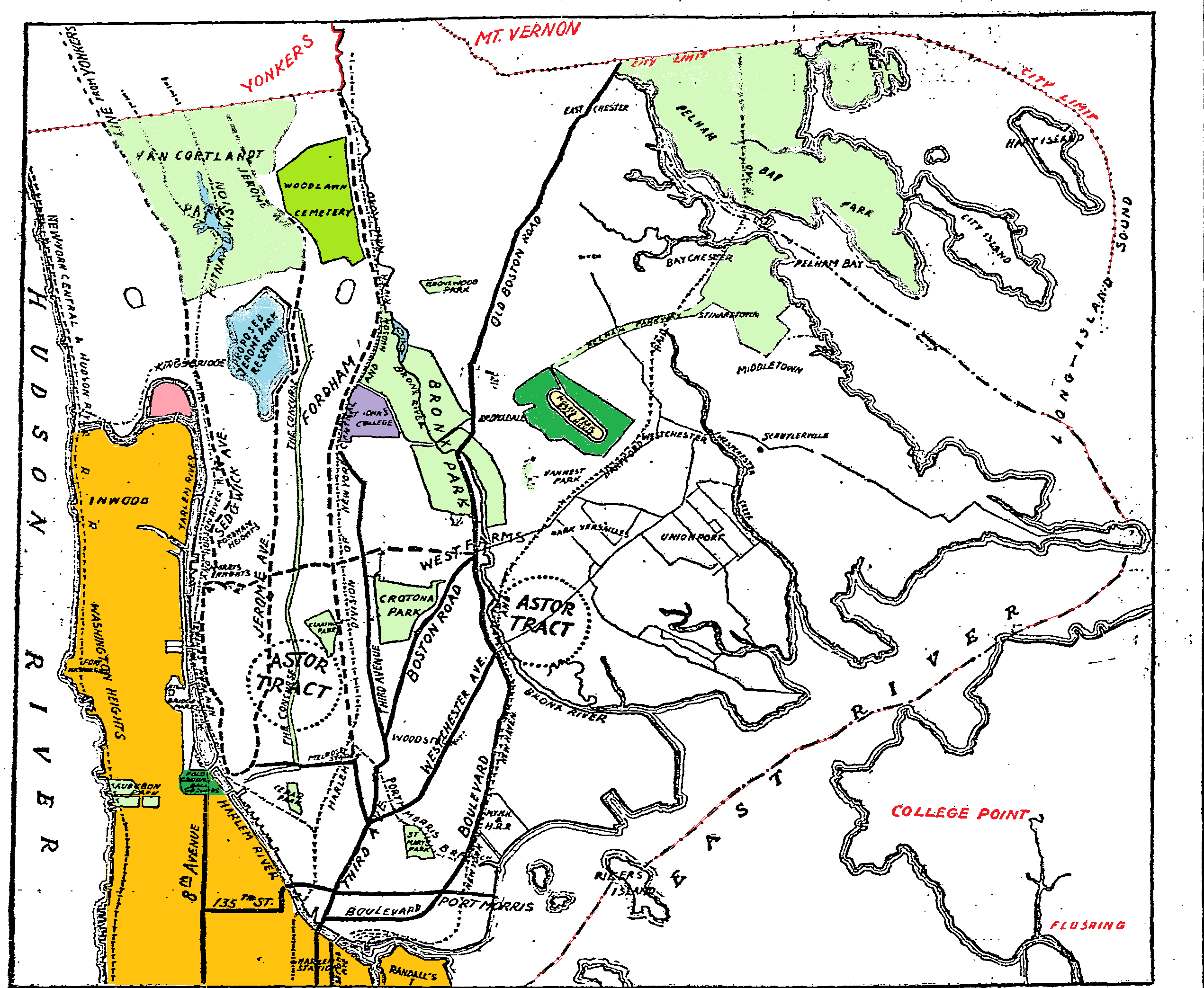
1896 New York Times map showing the location of Morris Park and other major landmarks in the Bronx

Morris Park Racecourse was situated in the area bounded on the south by Sackett Avenue and by what is today the Hell Gate Line railroad right-of-way, on the east by Williamsbridge Road, on the west by what is now Bronxdale Road, and on the north by Pelham Parkway. The grandstand stood at the intersection of Bogart and Fowler Avenues and the clubhouse was near the intersection of Fowler and Van Nest Avenues.

The racetrack covered 360 acres (1.5 km^{2}) and had a grandstand 650 feet (200 m) long that could accommodate up to 15,000 attendees. The main track had circumference of 1 1/2 mi (2.4 km), with a stretch that was 2,250 feet (690 m) long and widened from 80 feet (24 m) at the top of the homestretch to 240 feet (73 m) at the finish line. The north end of the track was located on a hill so horses had to run uphill on the backstretch and downhill on the homestretch. A chute on the main track permitted races of 1 1/8 mi (1.8 km) to be run with one turn. Another track called the Eclipse course ran diagonally across the main track on a straightaway of 3/4 mi (1.2 km), joining the main track at its finish line. It was named after Eclipse, a horse owned by Francis Morris. A six furlongs race on the Eclipse course was nicknamed the "Toboggan Slide" and continues to be run today at Aqueduct Racetrack as the Toboggan Handicap. The stables at Morris Park Racecourse held a total of 1,000 stalls, more than any two of the other American racetracks combined.

== Thoroughbred stakes races at Morris Park ==
- Belmont Stakes (1890–1904)
- Belle Meade Stakes
- Bouquet Stakes
- Champagne Stakes
- Dixiana Stakes
- Eclipse Stakes
- Hurricana Stakes
- Ladies Handicap
- Laureate Stakes
- Manhattan Handicap
- Metropolitan Handicap
- Matron Stakes
- Select Stakes
- Municipal Handicap
- New Rochelle Handicap
- New York Jockey Club Handicap
- Pocantico Handicap
- Rancho Del Paso Stakes
- Toboggan Slide
- White Plains Handicap

== Other defunct New York race tracks ==
- Aqueduct Racetrack
- Brighton Beach Race Course
- Fleetwood Park Racetrack
- Gravesend Race Track
- Jamaica Race Course
- Jerome Park Racetrack
- Roosevelt Raceway
- Sheepshead Bay Race Track
- Union Course

== See also ==
- 1905 Morris Park 5
