= Laurence J. Lesh =

American aviator (1892–1965)

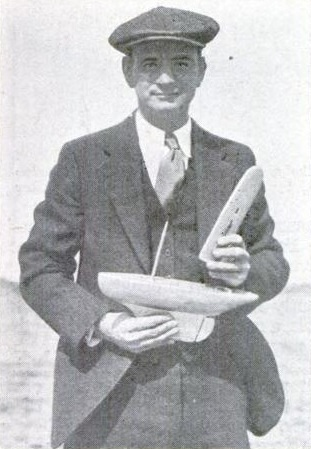
- Lesh in 1933
- Born: October 29, 1892; Fort Madison, Iowa, US
- Died: December 2, 1965 (aged 73); Fort Myers, Florida, US
- Occupation: Aviator
- Known for: Early glider flights
- Spouse: Gail McCreary

Laurence Jerome Lesh (October 29, 1892 – December 2, 1965) was an American aviator, a protégé of Octave Chanute, best known for building and flying gliders in the early part of the 20th century.

== Early life ==
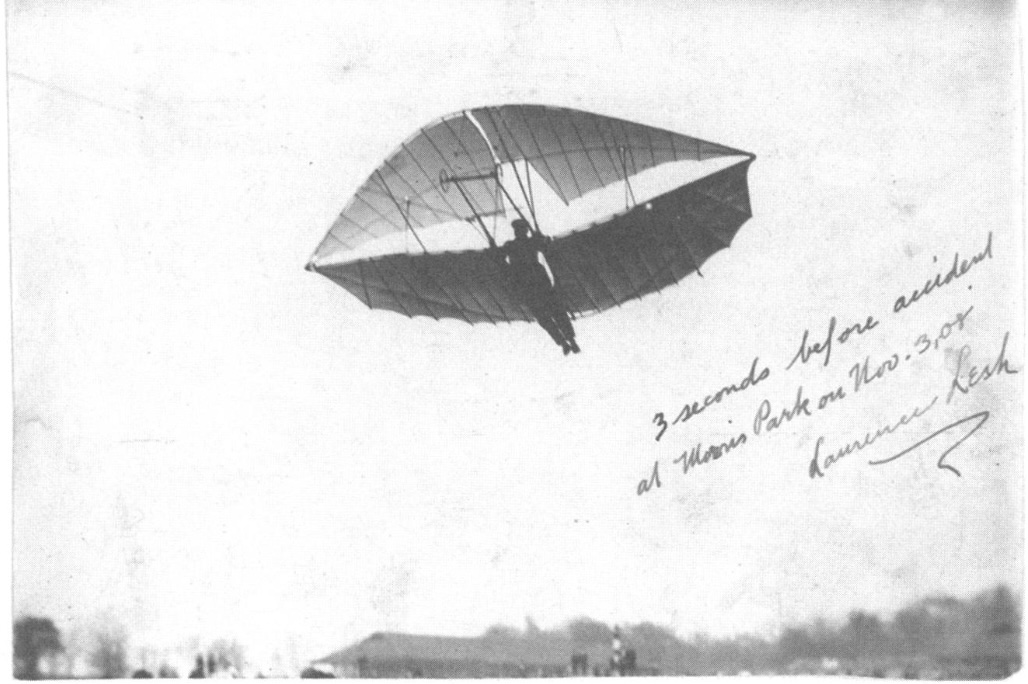
Lesh in the air over the Morris Park Aerodrome, November 1908

Lesh was born on October 29, 1892, in Fort Madison, Iowa, and moved to Montreal, Canada, as a young man. Lesh learned to fly in 1906, making his first flight in a glider in Chicago when he was 14 years old. After moving to Montreal, he continued to experiment with horse-drawn biplane gliders at Dominion Park. In 1907, he accomplished a glider flight from Montreal to Pointe-aux-Trembles, a distance of 7 miles (11 km). He also conducted a flight towed by a motorboat in the St. Lawrence River.

In 1908, he set a towed glider flight record and in 1910 he built an airplane in which he made his first powered flight. In 1908, he gave a series of glider demonstration flights at the Morris Park Aerodrome in the Bronx, New York. He crashed on his third flight of the day, suffering extensive injuries including a broken ankle, requiring 14 surgeries.

== Career ==
In 1910, at the age of 18, Lesh was hired by the University of Pennsylvania as an instructor of aeronautical engineering, his practical experience overcoming his young age and lack of formal education. Despite this, he never held a pilot's license.

Later in his life, Lesh was involved in AM radio, telephony, and air navigation. He held a patent on a wind driven generator he invented in 1912. He managed two commercial AM radio stations in Chicago: WDAP and WCFL. After moving to Fort Myers in the 1930s, he adopted an eclectic lifestyle, painting signs, applying his aerodynamic knowledge to the design of throwing knives, as well as some aviation projects. In 1916, Lesh mounted a searchlight on a Curtiss airplane, powered by a small generator attached to one of the propellers.

In the 1930s, Lesh experimented with rigid rotating sails for boats in a wind tunnel and in the model boat basin at Jackson Park in Chicago. These used an internal structure with a central box spar similar to an airplane wing and were mounted vertically, free to spin on ball bearings. By July 1933, Lesh was nearing completion of a full-size boat equipped with his invention, in which he would be testing canvas, plywood, and polished duralumin as skins for the sails, which he believed would be able to generate almost four times the force of conventional sails.

He married Gail McCreary and had one child, Laurende J.

== Death ==
Lesh died on December 2, 1965, in Fort Myers after a long illness.
