= Albert C. Triaca =

- Born: 1875; Italy
- Known for: Founder International School of Aeronautics

Albert C. Triaca (1875 – ?) was an Italian balloonist, pioneer aviator, and businessman.

Triaca grew up in Italy as the son of a wealthy Naval Officer. He started as a student of the École polytechnique de l'université Paris-Sud where he created an aircraft that was submitted to the war department for development. Triaca flew a balloon in France to qualify as a French pilot for competition, but had the balloon escape after landing from a two-hour flight. He traveled to America in 1908 to become director of the New York School of Automotive Engineers.

Triaca was an early Balloonist, marketing Stevens balloons in America. He provided a gold medal for the Aero Club of America balloon competition of 1909. The same year his French wife formed a woman's balloon club and participated in balloon events with her husband. On 1 May 1908, Triaca provided a balloon to the New York Air National Guard providing the first flights of the oldest National Guard unit in the United States.

Albert C. Triaca founded the International School of Aeronautics in Paris, France and New York in 1908. Triaca demonstrated models and slide shows of the latest aeronautic developments in America and France. Facilities included a hydrogen generator for balloons and dirigibles, and sleds to wind test propellers. Triaca moved the school to Garden City, New York, near the Hempsted Plains Aerodrome. He developed an early experimental water cooled biplane in 1909 tested at the Morris Park Aerodrome intended to fly at the 1910 Gorden Bennett race. He also competed that year in the Aero Club of America competition, earning the tenth balloon license issued by the organization.

Triaca partnered with Sidney B. Bowman Automobile company to market the Bayard dirigible, Antoinette motor, Stevens balloon, Curtiss motors and Chauvire aeroplane. He also listed himself as an aeronautical engineer to the New York-based Church Airplane company in 1910.

Triaca eventually separated from the Aero Club of America because he felt it was losing its interest in sport aviation. He closed the International School of Aeronautics in late 1910 to seek his fortunes in Massachusetts as president of the Aeroplane Company of America with the intention of license building Farman aircraft. When asked about the alarming death rate of early aviators, Triaca said that "the science is right, the art is right, it is the individual who is at fault".
