= Wilbur Ravel Kimball =

American aviator (1863–1940)

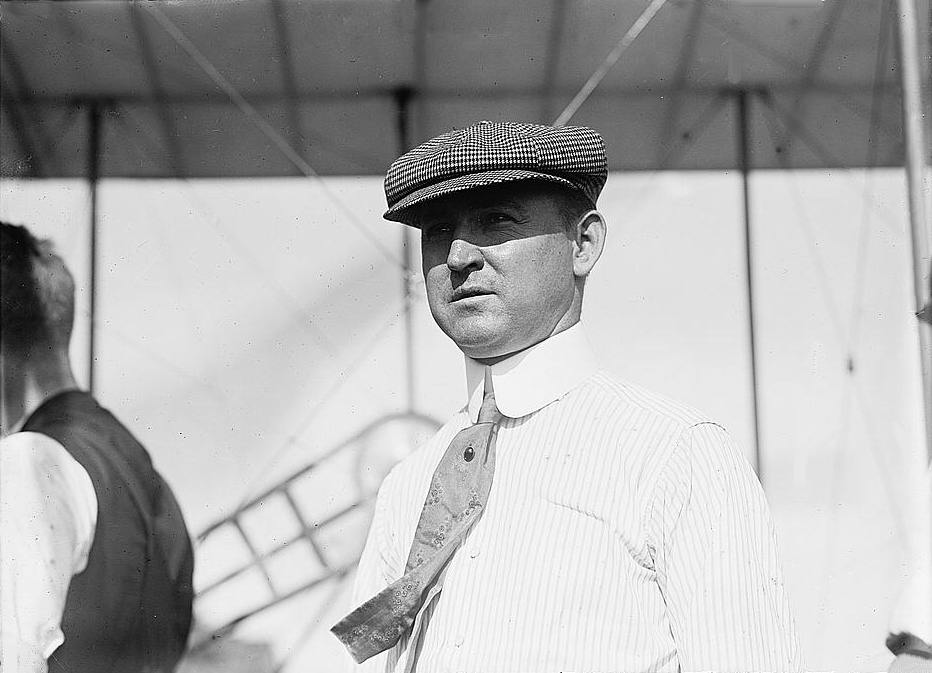
Kimball in 1911

Wilbur Ravel Kimball (January 28, 1863 – July 30, 1940) was an early aviator and pioneer of helicopter design. He was a member of the Aeronautic Society in New York City. He was also a member of the Early Birds of Aviation.

== Biography ==
He was born on January 28, 1863, in Woburn, Massachusetts, to Maria and Wilbur F. Kimball. He married Elizabeth Norton Gurney of Brockton, Massachusetts.

He died on July 30, 1940, at St. Luke's Hospital in Manhattan, age 77. He was buried in Woodbrook Cemetery in Woburn, Massachusetts.
