= Don Dwiggins =

American aviation journalist and author

- Born: November 15, 1913; Plainfield, New Jersey, U.S.
- Died: December 10, 1988 (aged 75); Malibu, California, U.S.
- Known for: Aviation journalist, author, historian
- Spouse: Olga Arabsky
- Children: 2

Don Dwiggins was an American journalist and author, specializing in aviation.

Dwiggins was born on November 13, 1918, in Plainfield, New Jersey. During World War II, he joined the United States Army Air Forces and worked as a flight instructor with the Royal Air Force. Beginning in the late 1940s, Dwiggins worked as a free-lance journalist and editor, working for a variety of Los Angeles-based publications. A prolific author, he wrote numerous articles for aviation magazines, and authored several dozen books, most of them focusing on aviation history. Between 1974 and 1982, he was a senior editor and columnist for Plane & Pilot magazine.

He was married to author Olga Arabsky, and had two children, Don Lindsay and Toni Kay. Dwiggins was killed in an automobile accident on December 10, 1988, along the Pacific Coast Highway in Malibu, California. He had just finished work on a four-volume history of American aviation.

== Publications ==
During his career, Dwiggins authored over 40 books. This is a partial list.

=== Books ===
- — (1965). They flew the Bendix Race; the history of the competition for the Bendix Trophy. Philadelphia, PA: Lippincott.
- — (1966). The air devils; the story of balloonists, barnstormers, and stunt pilots. Philadelphia, PA: Lippincott.
- — (1967). Hollywood pilot : the biography of Paul Mantz. Garden City, NY: Doubleday.
- — (1968). The barnstormers : flying daredevils of the roaring twenties. New York, NY: Grosset & Dunlap.
- — (1968). The SST : here it comes, ready or not : the story of the controversial supersonic transport. Garden City, NY: Doubleday.
- — (1969). Famous flyers and the ships they flew. New York, NY: Grosset & Dunlap.
- — (1965). Bailout : the story of parachuting and skydiving. New York, NY: Crowell-Collier.
- — (1970). On silent wings : adventures in motorless flight. New York, NY: Grosset & Dunlap.
- — (1973). Riders of the winds : the story of ballooning. New York, NY: Hawthorn Books.
- — (1975). Build your own sport plane : with homebuilt aircraft directory. New York, NY: Hawthorn Books.
- — (1975). Restoration of antique & classic planes. New York, NY: Sports Car Press. ISBN 0871120739.
- — (1976). Aircraft metalwork. New York, NY: Sports Car Press. ISBN 0871120828.
- — (1979). Low-horsepower fun aircraft you can build. Blue Ridge Summit, PA: TAB Books. ISBN 0830697101.
- — (1979). Man-powered aircraft. Blue Ridge Summit, PA: TAB Books. ISBN 0830698515.
- — (1980). 31 practical ultralight aircraft you can build. Blue Ridge Summit, PA: TAB Books. ISBN 0830699376.
- — (1980). The complete book of airships : dirigibles, blimps & hot air balloons. Blue Ridge Summit, PA: TAB Books. ISBN 0830696962.
- — (1982). The complete book of cockpits. Blue Ridge Summit, PA: TAB Books. ISBN 0830623329.
- — (1982). Flying the frontiers of space. New York, NY: Dodd, Mead. ISBN 0396080413.
- — (1984). Welcome to flying : a primer for pilots. Blue Ridge Summit, PA: TAB Books. ISBN 0830623620.
- — (1985). Flying the space shuttles. New York, NY: Dodd, Mead. ISBN 0396085105.
- — (1987). Hello? Who's out there? : the search for extraterrestrial life. New York, NY: Dodd, Mead. ISBN 0396088422.
