= Augustus Moore Herring =

Aircraft experimenter

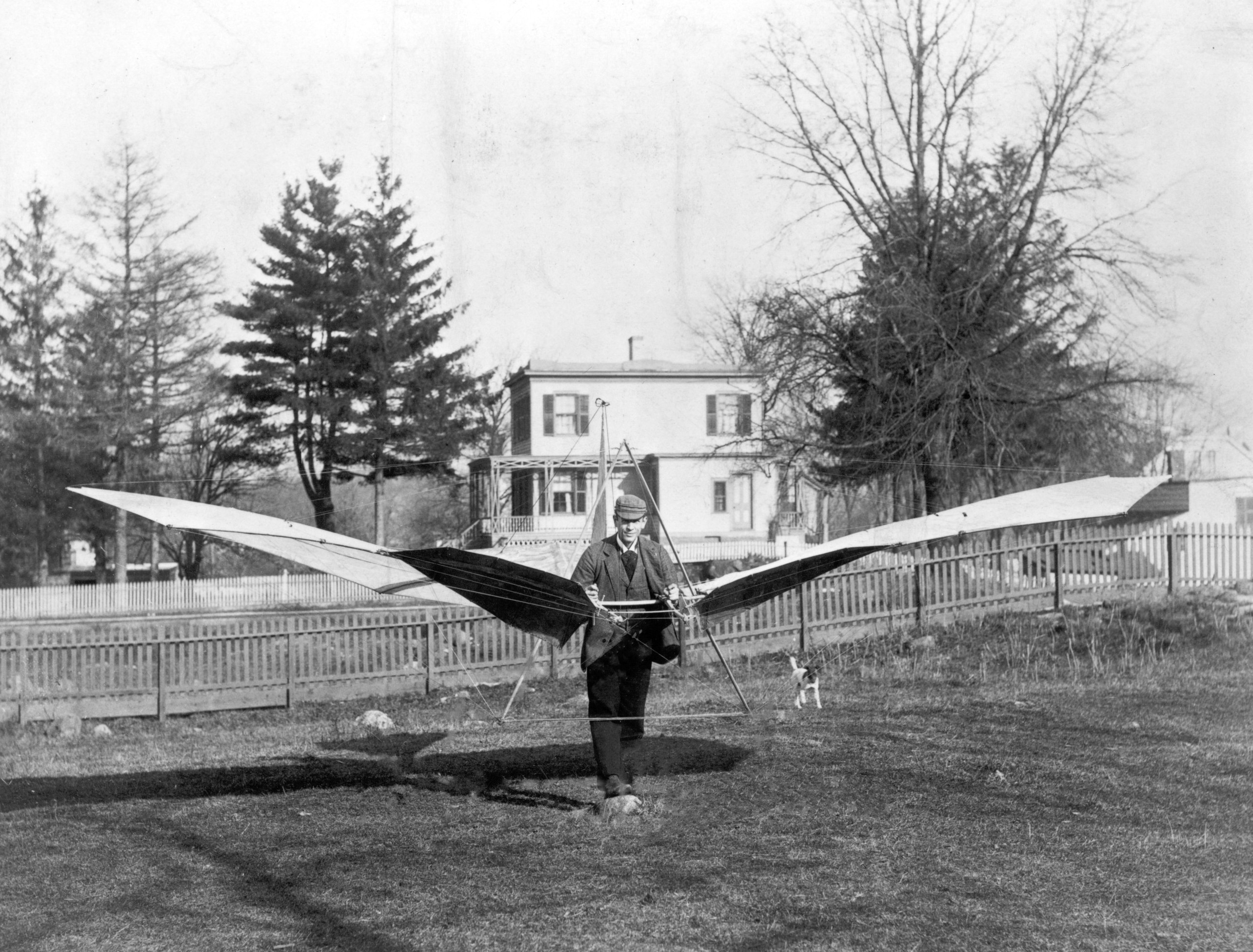
An early glider by Herring

Augustus Moore Herring (August 3, 1867 – July 17, 1926) was an American aviation pioneer, who sometimes is claimed by Michigan promoters to be the first true aviator of a motorized heavier-than-air aircraft.

== Biography ==
Herring was born in Covington, Georgia, to William F. Herring, a wealthy cotton broker, and his wife Cloe Perry Conyers. He studied in both Switzerland and Germany, before his family settled in New York in 1884. In 1885-6, as a student at the Stevens Institute of Technology, Herring was already building models of flying machines. By 1893, he had built a full sized glider – which he crashed when trying to leave the ground. He began studying glider expert Otto Lilienthal's work. In 1894, Herring built a Type 11-monoplane glider based on Otto Lilienthal's 1893 German patent.

Herring was then hired by Octave Chanute to build and test aircraft models from plans drawn up by either Herring and Chanute. Later in 1895, Samuel Pierpont Langley hired Herring to assist in his experiments. Herring was rehired by Chanute in January 1896, but continued experimenting on his own. In December 1896, he applied for a patent of a man-supporting, heavier-than-air "flying machine" that was motor powered and controllable, but the patent application was rejected.

On October 10, 1898, Herring telegraphed Chanute to come and watch him fly a powered aeroplane of his own design, based on the Chanute-type biplane structure, using a compressed air engine at Silver Beach Amusement Park in St. Joseph, Michigan. He could not get airborne. Herring was reported to have made a flight slightly above the ground for a level distance of more than 70 feet (21 m) in 10 seconds on October 24, 1898, witnessed by two locals.

In 1909 Herring joined Glenn Curtiss to create the Herring-Curtiss Company. The next year, he left Curtiss and joined Starling Burgess in Marblehead, Massachusetts to design and build aeroplanes. He left Burgess after a year, following disagreements with another Burgess partner, Greely S. Curtis. Herring brought suit against Glenn Curtiss, claiming he had been cheated out of his property and ideas. Herring claimed to have a patent, though no proof was found to exist.

Herring did some aviation design work for the United States Army during World War I, he later was partially paralyzed by a series of strokes.

He died in 1926 at the age of 59, survived by his wife, the former Lillian Mellen. Four years later Herring won his suit against Curtiss with a sizeable financial award.

== Claims as first to fly ==
Aviation historian Phil Scott in The Shoulders of Giants: A History of Human Flight to 1919 (1995, ISBN 0-201-62722-1) wrote that he does not consider Herring a candidate for the first flight claim. Scott says Herring's glider was difficult to steer and his two-cylinder, three-horsepower compressed air engine could operate for only 30 seconds at a time. Scott considers Herring as having simply expanded the traditional hang-gliding by adding an engine.

Herring's defenders point out that hang-glider fliers today steer their aircraft by shifting their body, as Herring did. This method was superseded by the Wright Brothers system of dynamic three-axis control used by most aircraft flying today.
