= List of aviation pioneers =

Aviation pioneers are people directly and indirectly responsible for the creation and advancement of human flight capability, including people who worked to achieve manned flight before the invention of aircraft, as well as others who achieved significant "firsts" in aviation after heavier-than-air flight became routine. Pioneers of aviation have contributed to the development of aeronautics in one or more ways: through science and theory, theoretical or applied design, by constructing models or experimental prototypes, the mass production of aircraft for commercial and government request, achievements in flight, and providing financial resources and publicity to expand the field of aviation.

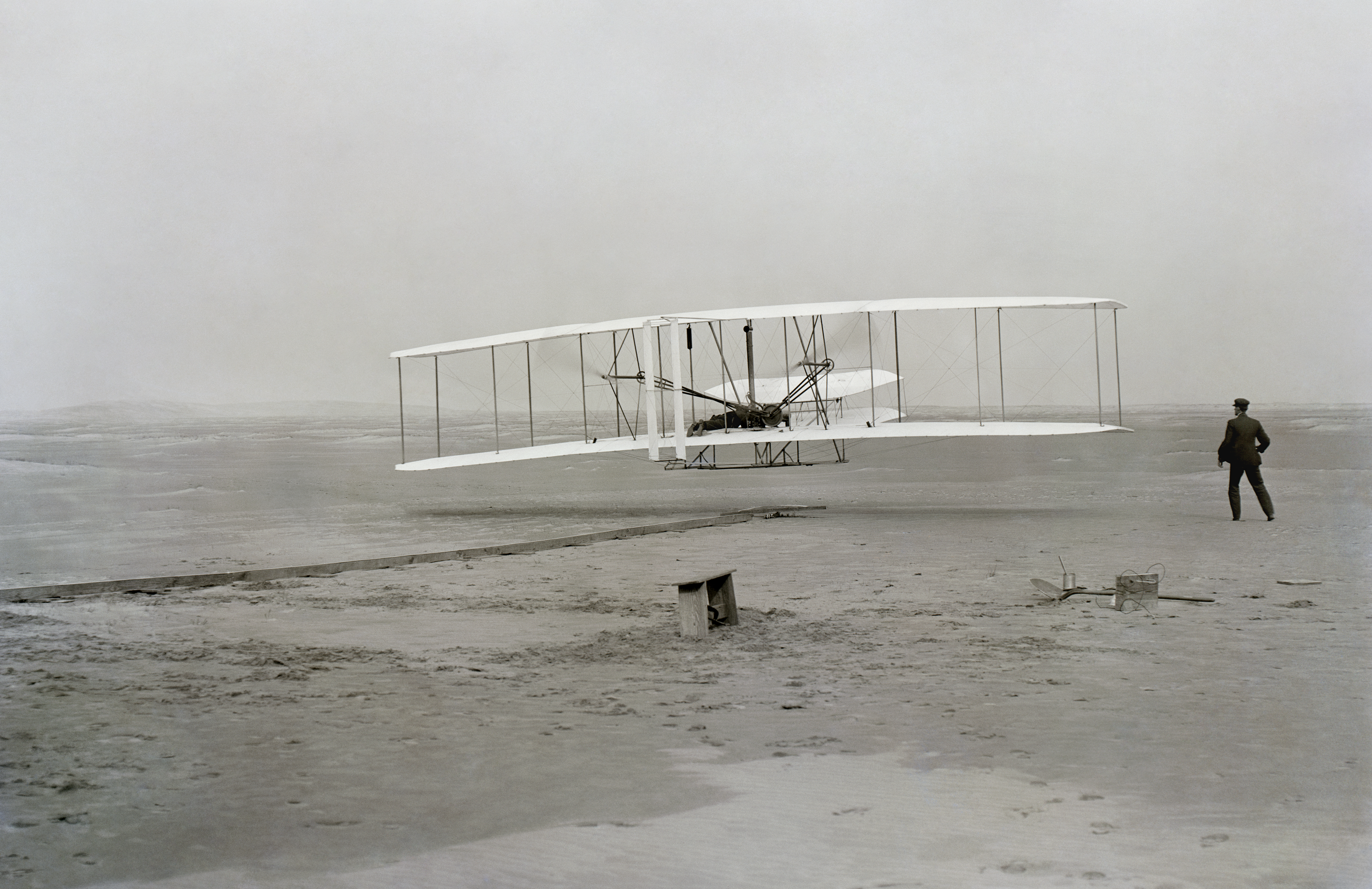
The Wright brothers' first powered, controlled, and sustained flight (12 seconds covering 37 meters), captured on film on December 17, 1903

== Table key ==
=== Pioneer type ===
- Science: Contributions to aerodynamic theory, aviation principles, discoveries advancing aircraft development, etc.
- Design: Original or derivative ideas or drawings for conceptual/experimental/practical methods of air travel
- Construction: Building prototypes/experimental/practical aircraft
- Manufacture: Building aircraft to fill commercial or government requests
- Aviator: International firsts, major records, major awards received
- Support: Significant industrial endorsements, philanthropic, founding of relevant organizations, etc.
- (†) : A dagger following the pioneer's name indicates they died in or as a result of an aircraft accident. When available, the aircraft type/model and the place of the accident are included in the text.

=== Sorting ===
The table is organized by pioneer name in alphabetical order. Columns for Name, Date of birth/Date of death, Country and Achievement can be sorted in either ascending or descending order. If two pioneers are paired together, sorting by DOB or Country uses the information for the first of the pair. The Achievement column will sort according to the date of the pioneer's earliest significant contribution to aviation.

== Inclusion criteria ==
The list is of outright records, irrespective of race, nationality or gender, and in which at least one of the following criteria is met:

- Scientific contribution to theory and principles (whether correct or not) that were used as contemporary resources, building blocks, or influenced period thought, significant scientific or theoretical achievements with model aircraft;
- Designing any aircraft (pre-1910), or a distinct/innovative new design;
- Constructing a prototype aircraft (pre-1910);
- Manufacturing aircraft (including some direct or supervisory control over design) for commercial and/or military contracts (intended to represent founders of the aviation industry);
- Flying (Aviator) solo in an aircraft and receiving a relevant flying certificate (pre-1910); or any significant national (e.g., a flight representing a country's first) or international achievement, or flight award (initial record holders or demolishing existing records, but not simply breaking established records);
- Supporting aviation (e.g., positive publicity; personal, corporate and/or philanthropic sponsorship, education).

== Table ==
† indicates died in an air accident

List of aviation pioneers
Name	Date of birth Date of death	Country birth (work)	Pioneer	Type	Achievements
Clément Ader	4 Feb 1841; 5 Mar 1925	France	Science; Design; Construction; Manufacture; Aviator	Propeller	First brief uncontrolled powered flight (“hop”) for 50 m (160 ft), 20 cm (8 in) from the ground in steam-powered Éole (9 Oct 1890), designed, constructed and tested Ader Avion II (1893) and Ader Avion III (14 Oct 1897). (Note: Ader was regarded by many to be the French "father of aviation".)
Diego Marín Aguilera	1757; 1799	Spain	Science; Design; Construction	Glider	Reportedly glided c. 400 m distance at c. 5 m height using his own invention (15 May 1793).
John Alcock† and Arthur Brown	5 Nov 1892; 18 Dec 1919 and 23 Jul 1886; 4 Oct 1948	England (Great Britain); Scotland (Great Britain)	Aviator	Propeller	First non-stop transatlantic flight in a modified Vickers Vimy (14/15 June 1919); (†) Vickers Viking, Rouen, France, en route to Paris.
Aldasoro brothers Juan Pablo and Eduardo	14 Sep 1893; 4 Oct 1962 and 27 Oct 1894; 10 Nov 1968	Mexico	Science; Design; Construction	Glider; Propeller	First Mexican aviators to graduate from the Moissant School; Juan Pablo was the first to fly over the Statue of Liberty (12 Mar 1913). (Note: Wilbur Wright flew around the Statue of Liberty (29 September 1909) .) They also helped contribute to improve aerodynamics by designing a "thick wing" long before other inventors.
Ismail ibn Hammad al-Jawhari†	unk c. 1005	Kazakhstan	Design; Construction; Aviator	Pre-history; Glider	(†) attempted flight from the roof of the Nishapur Mosque in Khorosan (c. 1005).
Feng Ru†	12 Oct 1883; 25 Aug 1912	China (United States, China)	Design; Construction; Aviator	Propeller	Often called the "Father of Chinese Aviation", Feng Ru designed, built, and flew the first Chinese-made airplane in Oakland, California in 1909. He returned to China in 1911 to support the Xinhai Revolution, where he continued aircraft development. (†) Died in an air accident during a demonstration flight in Guangzhou, China, in 1912.
Frederick W. "Casey" Baldwin	2 Jan 1882; 7 Aug 1948	Canada	Design; Construction; Manufacture; Aviator	Propeller	Chief Engineer, Aerial Experiment Association (1907–09); first powered flight by a Canadian in the Red Wing (12 Mar 1909); co-designer Red Wing (1908), White Wing (1908), and Silver Dart (1909); with J.A.D. McCurdy (and financial support from Alexander Graham Bell) formed the Canadian Aerodrome Company (1909), Canada's first aircraft manufacturing company.
Joaquín Loriga	1895; 1927	Spain	Aviator	Breguet XIX	First raid between Spain and Philippines (5 May 1926).
Juan de la Cierva	21 Sep 1895; 9 Dec 1936	Spain	Aviator and aeronautical engineer	Autogyro or gyrocopter	Invented the autogyro, the predecessor of the modern helicopter (9 Jan 1923). De la Cierva's flapping hinge overcame the problems of early rotor-winged flight, and is the basis of the modern helicopter rotor.
Alexander Graham Bell	3 Mar 1847; 2 Aug 1922	Scotland (United States) (Canada)	Science; Design; Construction; Support	Glider; Propeller	Founder and chair, Canadian-American aeronautical research group Aerial Experiment Association (AEA) (30 Sep 1907 – 31 Mar 1909); in 1908 and 1909, the AEA designed, constructed, and flew four powered aircraft: the Red Wing, White Wing, June Bug, and Silver Dart; technical innovations include the tricycle landing gear (Note: Bell's initial kite-like designs were built by McCurdy and Baldwin and could only sustain flight by being towed into the air.) and the wingtip aileron.
Mabel Bell	25 Nov 1857; 3 Jan 1923	United States (United States) (Canada)	Support	n/a	Financial sponsorship, Aerial Experiment Association (1907–09).
Giuseppe Mario Bellanca	19 Mar 1886; 26 Dec 1960	Italy (Italy) (United States)	Design; Construction; Manufacture	Propeller	Bellanca Flying School (1912–16); (Note: Taught Fiorello La Guardia how to fly in exchange for driving lessons.) designed first enclosed monoplane cabin (1917); founded Bellanca Aircraft Company (1927).
Oskar Bider†	12 Jul 1891; 7 Jul 1919	Switzerland	Aviator; Support	Propeller	First crossing of the Pyrenees (24 Jan 1913); (Note: Crossing the Pyrenees from Pau to Madrid.) Swiss airmail flight (9 Mar 1913); (Note: airmail flight from Basel to Liestal.) first crossing of the Alps (13 May 1913); (Note: Crossing the Alps from Bern to Sion.) (†) Nieuport 21, Dübendorf, Switzerland.
Bladud	9th Century BC	unknown	Design; Construction; Aviator	Pre-history; Glider	According to Historia Regum Britanniae (written c. 1138 by Geoffrey of Monmouth), Bladud, a legendary King of Britain, made wings from feathers and attempted a flight (852 BC). (Note: Geoffrey’s publication in 1138, almost 2,000 years after the alleged flight, is the first historical mention of Bladud.)
Louis Blériot	1 Jul 1872; 1 Aug 1936	France	Design; Construction; Manufacture; Aviator	Propeller	First airplane (Blériot VII) with a modern layout : monoplane, conventional tail, fully covered fuselage, front propeller / enclosed engine (1907). First to use a combination of hand/arm-operated joystick and foot-operated rudder control. First heavier-than-air crossing of the English Channel in a Blériot XI (25 Jul 1909). First actual industrial aircraft manufacturer - By the end of September 1909, orders had been received for 103 Blériot type XI. Just two years later 500 Blériots has been sold.
Enea Bossi, Sr.	29 Mar 1888; 9 Jan 1963	Italy (United States)	Science; Design; Construction; Manufacture	Propeller; Rotor	Founder, American Aeronautical Corporation (1928); designer, Budd BB-1 Pioneer (1931), the first stainless-steel airplane; co-designer of the Pedaliante ("Pedal Glider") (1936), the first human-powered aircraft; (Note: This claim is disputed since the test pilot was a seasoned cyclist and it has been claimed that only someone with extreme conditioning and/or endurance could fly the Pedaliante.) subsequent improvements (combined with a catapult-assisted launch) led to a 1 km (0.62 mi) flight 9 m (29.5 ft) from the ground (18 Mar 1937).
Herbert G. Brackley	4 Oct 1894; 15 Nov 1948	England; United States; Japan	Aviator	Propeller	First flight from Newfoundland to New York (1919); organised the Japanese Naval Air Arm (1921-1924); first Air Superintendent of Imperial Airways (1924);
Eduardo Bradley	9 Apr 1887; 3 Jun 1951	Argentina	Design; Construction; Aviator	Balloon	First crossing of the Andes in a (coal gas-filled) balloon (24 Jun 1916); (Note: From Santiago, Chile to Mendoza, Argentina, reaching an altitude of 8,100 m (26,575 ft).) set numerous ballooning records: duration (28 hours 10 minutes); distance 900 km (559 mi). (Note: From Buenos Aires to Rio Grande do Sul.)
Marcel Brindejonc des Moulinais†	18 Feb 1892; 18 Aug 1916	France	Aviator	Propeller	Finished first (but did not win) the Geisler Challenge Trophy (1913); (Note: See reference for disqualification details.) long distance champion; (†), Vadelaincourt, France (shot down).
Artur de Sacadura Cabral†	23 May 1881; 15 Nov 1924	Portugal	Aviator	Propeller	Director, Naval Aviation Services (1918); first aerial crossing of the South Atlantic with Gago Coutinho using a Fairey III-D (30 Mar – 17 Jun 1922); (Note: From Lisbon to Rio de Janeiro in 79 days (with only 62 hours of flying time) using three different planes (two were lost at sea), and relying solely on astronomical navigation.) († disappeared), English Channel crossing.
George Cayley	27 Dec 1773; 15 Dec 1857	England	Science; Design; Construction	Glider; Propeller; Rotor	Experimented in aeronautics at age 13 with a Chinese top (1796); first design of a fixed-wing aircraft (1799); used a whirling arm to test aerofoils at varying angles (1804); presented a paper outlining specific design parameters for building a glider (1810); designed, constructed, and had flown (short hop) a tri-plane (1849). Cayley was one of the most significant pioneers in aviation history. (Note: Wilbur Wright, in 1909, commented on Cayley: “About 100 years ago an Englishman, Sir George Cayley, carried the science of flying to a point which it had never reached before and which it scarcely reached again during the last century”.)
Giuseppe Cei†	25 Jan 1889; 28 Mar 1911	Italy (Italy) (France)	Aviator	Propeller	Flew around the Eiffel tower (19 Mar 1911); (†) (Bleriot airplane), near Puteaux, France.
Hezârfen Ahmed Çelebi	1609; 1640	Turkey	Design; Construction; Aviator	Glider	Reportedly achieved sustained unpowered flight for 3.36 km (2 mi) (c. 1638). (Note: Gliding from the Galata Tower, across the Bosphorus, landing at Doğancılar Square.)
Lagari Hasan Çelebi	17th century	Turkey	Design; Construction; Aviator	Rocket	Reported to have achieved flight (20 seconds to an elevation of roughly 300 meters) using a winged rocket powered by gunpowder (c. 1630s).
Henri Coandă	7 Jun 1886; 25 Nov 1972	Romania (France) (Great Britain) (Romania)	Science; Design; Construction	Glider; Propeller; Jet	Designed Coandă-1910 with a propeller-less aero-reactive engine, exhibited Paris Air Show (Oct 1910), followed by a claimed but generally discounted first flight (16 Dec 1910); before WWI designed the Bristol-Coanda Monoplanes in Great Britain; discovered Coandă effect (1930). (Note: Quote from Coanda: “A poet is a man who sees abstract worlds and tries to bring them in the concrete world. In this regard I believe that any inventor, engineer or scientist, regardless of the aria of his concerns, is also a poet.”)
Samuel Franklin Cody†	6 Mar 1867; 7 Aug 1913	United States (United States) (Great Britain)	Design; Construction; Aviator	Glider; Propeller	Developed and flew human-lifting kites; kite instructor for the Royal Engineers (1904); contributed to the development of the British Army Dirigible No 1 Nulli Secundus (1907); first flight of a piloted airplane in Great Britain (16 Oct 1908, 1,390 ft); issued Royal Aero Club certificate No.10 (14 Jun 1910); (†) Cody Floatplane, with passenger William Evans, Aldershot, England.
Alfred Comte	4 Jun 1895; 1 Nov 1965	Switzerland	Design; Manufacture	Propeller	Swiss pilot's license (1908); partner and chief pilot Ad Astra Aero (1920); designed and built aircraft (1923–35); established an aviation school (1946–50).
Gago Coutinho	17 Feb 1869; 18 Feb 1959	Portugal	Aviator	Propeller	First aerial crossing of the South Atlantic using a Fairey III-D with Artur de Sacadura Cabral (30 Mar – 17 Jun 1922); (Note: From Lisbon to Rio de Janeiro in 79 days (with only 62 hours of flying time) using three different planes (two were lost at sea), and relying solely on astronomical navigation.) developed a sextant-type instrument to create an artificial horizon.
Glenn Curtiss	21 May 1878; 23 Jul 1930	United States (United States) (Canada)	Design; Construction; Manufacture; Aviator	Propeller; Rotor	Director of Experiments, Aerial Experiment Association (1907–09); designed the June Bug (1908) and won the Scientific American Trophy (4 Jul 1908) by making the first official one-kilometer flight in North America; co-designer Red Wing (1908), White Wing (1908), and Silver Dart (1909); founded his own company (1909) which became the Curtiss Aeroplane and Motor Company (1916); designed, built, and flew the first successful flying-boat (12 Jan 1912); established Canada's first aviation training school in Toronto (1915); awarded the Langley Gold Medal (1913).
Giacomo D'Angelis	1844	France (India)	Design; Construction; Aviator	Propeller	First reported flight in Asia (Madras, India) (10 Mar 1910) in a self-constructed biplane.
Félix du Temple	18 Jul 1823; 4 Nov 1890	France	Science(?); Design; Construction; Aviator	Propeller	With his brother, built a monoplane which (accelerating down a slope) “staggered briefly into the air” (1874), considered by some to be the powered take-off or hop of a powered fixed-wing aircraft.
Bertram Dickson	21 Dec 1873; 28 Sep 1913	United Kingdom	Aviator	Propeller	First British serviceman to fly [1910]; gained Aero-Club de France license no. 81 on 12 April. Dickson took part in the Lanark flying meet in August 1910, where he won the £400 prize for the greatest aggregate distance flown.; died 1913 of injuries from 1910 midair collision
Armand Dufaux and Henri Dufaux	13 Jan 1883; 17 Jul 1941 and 18 Sep 1879; 25 Dec 1980	Switzerland	Design; Construction; Aviator	Propeller; Rotor	Working together patented a design for a helicopter (1904), constructed and demonstrated a working model (13–17 Apr 1905); designed and built the first Swiss airplanes, including the biplane Dufaux 4 and Dufaux 5; Armand set a new over-water distance record of 66 km (41 mi) crossing Lake Geneva (28 Aug 1910).
J. W. Dunne	1875; 24 Aug 1949	Ireland	Science; Design; Construction; Aviator	Glider(?); Propeller	Discussed aeronautics and aviation with H.G. Wells (c. 1901); member Royal Engineers, working on design and construction of the first British military airplane (1906–08); in secret military trials, and with a career goal of improving stability during flight, Dunne's aircraft flew approximately 40 meters (1908); development of his V-shaped swept wing design significantly advanced flight stability. (Note: In January of 1912, Dunne demonstrated improved flight stability by taking a full page of notes on paper during a 6 minute solo flight with two turns.)
Amelia Earhart†	24 Jul 1897; 7 Jul 1937	United States	Aviator; Support	Propeller	First female aviator to fly solo across the Atlantic Ocean and set many other records; she was one of the first aviators to promote commercial air travel, wrote best-selling books about her flying experiences, and was instrumental in the formation of The Ninety-Nines, an organization for female pilots. Disappeared during a flight on a Lockheed Electra 10E from Lae Airfield to Howland Island.
Eilmer of Malmesbury	c. 984	unknown	Design; Construction; Aviator	Pre-history; Glider	Reportedly flew 200 meters from a tower using rigid wings (c. 1005).
Eugene Ely†	21 Oct 1886; 19 Oct 1911	United States	Aviator	Propeller	First airplane (Curtiss Model D) take-off from a ship (USS Birmingham (14 Nov 1910); (Note: Modifications for take-off required outfitting the ship with “an 83-foot-long ramp, sloping 5 degrees over the bow. The ramp’s forward edge was 37 feet above the water”.) first landing (Curtiss Model D) on a ship (USS Pennsylvania) using a tailhook (18 Jan 1911); (Note: “The landing platform, constructed of pine planks, was 130 feet long by 32 feet wide. Ten feet of it hung at an angle -- with a drop of four feet -- over the stern of the ship. The arresting gear comprised 21 ropes -- each with 50-pound sandbags attached to either end -- laid across the runway. Each rope was suspended 8 inches above the deck. Three hooks had been affixed to the underside of the aircraft to catch on the ropes when the landing was made”.) (†), Macon, Georgia, flight exhibition.
August Euler	20 Nov 1868; 1 Jul 1957	Germany	Design; Manufacture; Aviator	Propeller	Built Voisin Freres aircraft (1908); first German pilot's license (1909); German flight duration record (3hr 6min 18sec) (1910).
Ernest Failloubaz	27 Jul 1892; 14 May 1919	Switzerland	Construction; Aviator; Support	Propeller	Constructed and piloted the first aircraft in Switzerland (10 May 1910); first Swiss pilot's license (10 Oct 1910).
Henry Farman	26 May 1874; 17 Jul 1958	France (Note: Born in France to a British family, Farman took French nationality in 1937.)	Design; Construction; Manufacture; Aviator	Propeller	Winner (in the Voisin-Farman No.1) of the Deutsch-Archdeacon Prize (13 Jan 1908); (Note: “Awarded to the inventor of a flying machine who shall first accomplish a flight of one kilometer in a closed circuit without touching the ground…”.) with brothers Richard and Maurice founded Farman Aviation Works (1908).
Ferdinand Ferber†	8 Feb 1862; 22 Sep 1909	France	Design; Construction; Aviator; Support	Glider; Propeller	Attempted (unsuccessfully) to replicate the Wright 1901 Glider from photographs; designed a series of aircraft (Ferber I through Ferber IX) for the Antoinette Company; designed, constructed, and flew the first tractor configuration biplane (May 1905); (†) Voisin biplane, Boulogne, France.
Anton “Anthony” Fokker	6 Apr 1890; 23 Dec 1939	Dutch East Indies (Germany) (Netherlands) (United States)	Design; Construction; Manufacture; Aviator(?)	Propeller	Designed, built, and flew the "Spin" (31 Aug 1911); involved with the Luftstreitkräfte during WWI; constructed (Note: The design was an adaptation of the device recovered by the Germans from the downed airplane of Roland Garros.) a machine gun synchronizer (22 Apr 1915), leading to an aviation period known as the Fokker Scourge; founded the US-based Atlantic Aircraft Corporation (1924) to manufacture his product in the United States. (Note: The death of Knute Rockne in the 1931 crash of a Transcontinental & Western Air Fokker F.10 was highly publicized and shook the public’s confidence in Fokker aircraft.)
Gerrit Johannes Geysendorffer†	1 April 1892; 26 Jan 1947	Netherlands	Aviator	Propeller	First Dutch licensed airline transport pilot (1921); awarded the 1926 Harmon National Trophy for the Netherlands; captain of the first intercontinental charter flight (1927). Died in the 1947 KLM Douglas DC-3 Copenhagen disaster.
Lyman Gilmore Jr	11 Jun 1874; 18 Feb 1951	United States	Design; Construction	Propeller	(Based largely on self-report and a 1936 interview) Tethered glider flight (1893); free glider flight (1894); (claimed in 1927) controlled steam-powered aircraft flight (15 May 1902); all records, papers, and aircraft were destroyed in a fire; opened first commercial airfield (15 Mar 1907).
Tryggve Gran	20 Jan 1888; 8 Jan 1980	Norway (Norway) (Great Britain)	Aviator	Propeller	First flight across the North Sea (30 Jul 1914), four hours ten minutes from Cruden Bay, Scotland to Klep (near Stavanger), Norway in a Blériot monoplane.
René Grandjean	12 Nov 1884; 14 Apr 1963	Switzerland	Design; Construction; Aviator	Propeller	Designed and built aircraft for Ernest Failloubaz and his record-setting flight (1910); first snow takeoff and landing using skis (2 Feb 1912); first water takeoff in a Swiss seaplane (4 Aug 1912).
Andrea Grimaldi	c. 1701	Italy	Design; Construction	Glider	Italian monk reported to have flown from Calais to London in a bird-shaped airship with a 22-foot wingspan (Oct 1751).
Lawrence Hargrave	29 Jan 1850 6 July 1915	United Kingdom (Australia)	Science Design Construction Aviator	Glider	Invented the Box Kite (1893), greatly improving lift to drag ratio. Reached lift of 16 feet under a train of four of his box kites (1894). Invented a rotary engine (1889), which was much used in early aviation.
Augustus Moore Herring	3 Aug 1867; 17 Jul 1926	United States	Design; Construction	Glider; Propeller	Assisted S.P. Langley (May – Nov 1895); test pilot for Octave Chanute; designed the Herring regulator; designed and constructed a compressed-air motorized biplane and reported a 15-meter hop (10 Oct 1898) and a 22-meter hop (12 Oct 1898); business partners with Glenn Curtiss (1909).
Howard Hughes	24 Dec 1905; 5 Apr 1976	United States	Design; Manufacture; Aviator; Support	Propeller	Founded Hughes Aircraft (1932); (Note: Designed and manufactured aircraft (e.g., H-1 Racer (1935), Hughes H-4 Hercules or Spruce Goose), the AIM-4 Falcon air-to-air missile.) set record for flying around the world (91 hours) in a Lockheed Super Electra (1938); received the Congressional Gold Medal (1939) for achievements in aviation; majority stockholder in TWA (1939).
Vecihi Hürkuş	6 Jan 1895; 16 Jul 1969	Turkey	Design; Construction; Aviator	Propeller	Constructed and flew (15 minutes) the first airplane in Turkey (Vecihi K-VI) (28 Jan 1925); founded Turkey's first flying school (27 Sep 1932).
Abbas Ibn Firnas	810; 887	Spain	Design; Construction; Aviator	Pre-history; Glider	A 9th-century polymath covered himself with feathers and wings, and “flew faster than the phoenix in his flight when he dressed his body in the feathers of a vulture” (c. 875).
Karl Jatho	3 Feb 1873; 8 Dec 1933	Germany	Design; Construction; Aviator	Propeller	Made an “aerial leap” (18 meters) in a powered airplane (18 Aug 1903); (Note: “German historians do not claim that he made proper flights, but only that he was the first in Germany to leave the ground in a powered aeroplane under its own power”.)
Hugo Junkers	3 Feb 1859; 3 Feb 1935	Germany	Science; Design; Construction; Manufacture	Propeller	Engineer, thermodynamicist, pioneer developer of practical all-metal airframe structures, first used in the 1915-16 Junkers J 1, using all-cantilever structural concepts meant to place all strength-bearing components within an airframe's outer envelope and established all-metal aircraft manufacturing techniques later used by American designer William Bushnell Stout and Soviet designer Andrei Tupolev after World War I.
Wilhelm Kress	29 Jul 1836; 24 Feb 1913	Russia (Austria)	Science; Design; Construction; Aviator	Glider; Propeller	Developed a successful rubber-band powered model of a hang glider (1877); designed aircraft control stick (1900); executed short hops over water in his Drachenflieger (1901).
Francesco Lana de Terzi	1631; 1687	Italy	Science; Design	Pre-history; Balloon(?)	Designed an airship based on the theory of using evacuated metal spheres to create a lighter-than-air vehicle (1670).
Samuel Langley	22 Aug 1834; 27 Feb 1906	United States	Science; Design; Construction	Propeller	Designed and developed the Aerodrome No. 5 as a successful steam engine powered model which flew for 90 seconds covering roughly 3,300 ft (6 May 1896); conversion into a larger piloted aircraft was unsuccessful (1903).
Stephen Latchford	4 Feb 1883; 1 Oct 1974	United States	Science; Support	n/a	United States diplomat, head of State Department's early aviation committees; aviation specialist during Franklin D. Roosevelt and Harry S. Truman administrations. Also Chairman of United States Section at the International Technical Committee of Aerial Legal Experts.
Otto Lilienthal†	23 May 1848; 10 Aug 1896	Germany	Science; Design; Construction; Manufacture; Aviator	Glider	Designed and constructed a monoplane Derwitzer Glider (1891); after nearly 2,000 flights he constructed a two-surfaced glider (1895); (†) Glider crash (9 Aug 1896), Gollenberg, Germany.
Charles Lindbergh	4 Feb 1902; 26 Aug 1974	United States	Aviator; Support	Propeller	First solo non-stop flight across the Atlantic Ocean from New York to Paris in the Spirit of St. Louis (20/21 May 1927).
Ed Link	26 Jul 1904; 7 Sep 1981	United States	Science; Design; Support	n/a	Inventor of the Link Trainer flight simulator (1929); received Royal Aeronautical Society Wakefield Gold Medal (1947).
Mikhail Lomonosov	19 Nov 1711; 15 Apr 1765	Russian Empire	Science; Design; Construction	Rotor	Designed and constructed a model of a coaxial propeller helicopter (Jul 1754) to lift meteorological instruments.
Albin K. Longren	18 Jan 1882; 19 Nov 1950	United States	Aviator; Design; Manufacture	Propeller	Early pilot (1911) and barnstormer. Designed and manufactured numerous airplane models including the Longren AK with the first semi-monocoque body.
William S. Luckey†	15 Feb 1875; 20 Dec 1915	United States	Aviator	Propeller	Began flying at age 52 (1912); Curtiss Exhibition Flyers (1913–15); winner, Round-Manhattan Race (13 Oct 1913); (Note: A 60-mile circuit around Manhattan Island which he completed in just under 53 minutes.) (†) critically injured (6 Sep 1915) in Sturgeon Falls, ON, Canada.
Daniel J. Maloney†	1879; 18 July 1906	United States	Aviator	Glider	American pioneering aviator and test pilot who made the first high-altitude flights by man using Montgomery gliders in 1905. (†) Glider, Santa Clara, California.
Hiram Stevens Maxim	5 Feb 1840; 24 Nov 1916	United States (United Kingdom)	Science; Design; Construction	Rotor; Propeller	Patented a design for a steam-powered “flying machine” (1889, and refined in 1891); successful track-tethered test of a steam-engine powered biplane (Jul 1894); designed and constructed a biplane that never flew (1910)
John Alexander Douglas McCurdy	2 Aug 1886; 25 Jun 1961	Canada	Design; Construction; Manufacture; Aviator	Glider; Propeller	Treasurer & Assistant Engineer, Aerial Experiment Association (1907–09); first controlled powered flight in Canada "Silver Dart" (23 Feb 1909); with "Casey" Baldwin (and financial support from Alexander Graham Bell) formed the Canadian Aerodrome Company, Canada's first aircraft manufacturing company.
Walter Mittelholzer	2 Apr 1894; 9 May 1937	Switzerland	Science; Aviator; Support(?)	Propeller	Director and head pilot of Ad Astra Aero, later becoming Swissair; first north-south crossing of Africa (7 Dec 1926 – 21 Feb 1927); pioneer of aerial photography (Spitsbergen, 1923; Mount Kilimanjaro, 1929); personally flew/delivered a Fokker to Emperor Haile Selassie I (1934).
John Joseph Montgomery†	15 Feb 1858; 31 Oct 1911	United States	Science; Design; Construction; Aviator	Glider	Designed and constructed a series of early gliders, first to achieve unpowered controlled flight in the United States (1884). Designed tandem-wing gliders flown from high-altitude balloon launches (1904–1905), including first public flight exhibition in United States (29 April 1905). Developed pitcheron systems for control (first developed and applied in 1886, re-applied in 1911); (†) Glider, Evergreen, California.
Edwin Moon†	8 Jun 1886; 29 Apr 1920	England	Design; Construction; Aviator	Propeller	Designed, constructed, and flew a monoplane ("Moonbeam") (early to mid-1910); the meadows of North Stoneham Farm which he used to take-off and land would later become Southampton Airport; (†) Flying boat, Felixstowe, England.
J. T. C. Moore-Brabazon	8 Feb 1884; 17 May 1964	England	Aviator	Propeller	Holder of Royal Aero Club certificate No. 1. First United Kingdom citizen to make a flight in Britain.
Alexander Mozhayskiy	21 Mar 1825; 1 Apr 1890	Finland	Science; Design; Construction	Glider; Propeller	Designed and constructed a steam-engine powered airplane that reportedly flew (hopped) (20–30 meters) with the assistance of a ramp (1884).
Clyde Pangborn	28 Oct 1895; 29 Mar 1958	United States	Aviator	Propeller	First non-stop trans-Pacific flight (5 Oct 1931).
Cecil Pashley	14 May 1891; 1969	Great Britain	Flight trainer Aviator	Glider; Propeller	Founded the South Coast Flying club. Trained British pilots during world War I and World War II.
Richard Pearse	3 Dec 1877; 29 Jul 1953	New Zealand	Design; Construction; Aviator	Propeller	Reportedly achieved powered (but poorly controlled) flight (31 Mar 1903). (Note: Despite over 50 years of research on his achievements, no substantiated proof exists regarding the dates of his work.)
Horatio Phillips	1845; 1924	England	Science; Design; Construction	Glider; Propeller	Aeronautic theory: advancement of wind-tunnel design (1880s), development of aerofoil design, patented as “blades for deflecting air” (1884 and 1891); designed multiplanes with multiple sets of lifting surfaces, patented (1890), constructed (1893); first powered “hop-flight” (500 ft) in Great Britain (1907).
Percy Pilcher†	16 Jan 1866; 1 Oct 1899	England	Science; Design; Construction; Aviator	Glider	Designed and constructed hang-glider (The Bat), first to achieve unpowered controlled flight in Great Britain (12 Sep 1895); (†) crash-related injuries suffered on 30 Sep 1899, glider (The Hawk), near Stanford Hall, England.
John Cyril Porte	26 Feb 1884; 22 Oct 1919	Ireland (Ireland) (Great Britain)	Design; Construction; Manufacture; Aviator	Propeller	Aero Club de France aviator certificate (28 Jul 1911); test pilot (1913–14); began to design and construct (with Glen Curtiss) an aircraft capable of transatlantic flight (1914); testing was successful, but the flight was cancelled due to the outbreak of World War I. Royal Naval Air Service, Squadron Commander, RAF Hendon (1914); secret U.S. visit as an official envoy testing aircraft for the British Government (Sep 1915). Commander, Royal Naval Airstation Felixstowe, conducted flying-boat research; designed and constructed the Porte Baby (1916).
Augustus Post	25 Dec 1873; 4 Oct 1952	United States	Flying; Supporting	Propeller	Original founder of Aero Club of America which later became the National Aeronautic Association. Thirteenth man to fly solo, in 1908. Served as aid to Glenn Curtiss and co-authored The Curtiss Aviation Book published in 1912. Participated in Aerial Experiment Association. Served as official timer for Orville Wright’s record setting 57 minute flight at Ft. Myer, Virginia on September 9, 1908.
Edvard Rusjan†	6 Jun 1886; 9 Jan 1911	Austria-Hungary (Slovenia) (Croatia)	Design; Construction; Aviator	Propeller	Designed, constructed, and flew the first airplane in Slovenia (25 Nov 1909); (†), Belgrade, Serbia; first Serbian air exposition.
Charles Samson	8 July 1883; 5 Feb 1931	United Kingdom	Aviator	Propeller	One of the first four British naval officers to train as a pilot; first to fly an airplane (a Short S.27 biplane) off a moving ship (HMS Hibernia (May 1912).
Alberto Santos Dumont	20 Jul 1873; 23 Jul 1932	Brazil (France)	Science; Design; Construction; Manufacture; Aviator; Support	Balloon; Airship; Propeller	Winner, Deutsch Prize (19 Oct 1901); first powered winged aircraft flight in Europe (13 Sep 1906); winner, Archdeacon Cup (23 Oct 1906) and Aéro-Club de France Prize (12 Nov 1906); designed a light-weight monoplane Demoiselle and released the second variant (No. 20) from copyright or license (late 1909).
Ivan Sarić	27 Jun 1876; 23 Aug 1966	Austria-Hungary (Serbia)	Design; Construction	Propeller; Rotor	First public flight in Serbia (then Austro-Hungary) (16 Oct 1910). (Note: It has been suggested that Sarić’s first unobserved flight may have been in late June 1910.)
Thomas Selfridge†	8 Feb 1882; 17 Sep 1908	United States (United States) (Canada)	Design; Construction; Aviator	Airship; Propeller	Secretary, Aerial Experiment Association (1907–09); U.S. Army Lieutenant who assisted the AEA in engineering, designing and piloting the Red Wing; first U.S. Military officer to pilot a powered aircraft White Wing (19 May 1908); first fatality of powered flight (17 Sep 1908). (Note: While flying as a passenger with Orville Wright, Selfridge was the first to die in an aircraft accident.)
Igor Sikorsky	25 May 1889; 26 Oct 1972	Russian Empire (Russia) (United States)	Science; Design; Construction; Manufacture; Aviator	Propeller; Rotor	Designed and constructed the first four-engine aircraft, the Russky Vityaz cabin biplane, flew (13 May 1913); and the Ilya Muromets, prototype for a commercial airplane (1914); first brief flight in a practical helicopter (14 Sep 1939).
Sir Charles Kingsford Smith†	9 Feb 1897; 8 Nov 1935	Australia (Great Britain) (United States) (Australia)	Aviator	Propeller	First transpacific flight from the United States to Australia in the Southern Cross (31 May – 9 Jun 1928); (Note: With intermediate stops at Hawaii and Fiji) covering roughly 11,566 km (7,187 mi).) first non-stop Australian transcontinental flight (Aug 1928); first trans-Tasman flight (10/11 Sep 1928); († disappeared) Lady Southern Cross, over the Bay of Bengal.
Sir Thomas Sopwith	18 Jan 1888; 27 Jan 1989	England	Design(?); Construction; Manufacture; Aviator	Propeller	Royal Aero Club license No. 31 (22 Nov 1910); won £4000 Baron de Forest prize for the longest flight from England to the Continent in a British-built aeroplane, (169 miles (272 km) in 3 hours 40 minutes) in a Howard Wright 1910 Biplane (18 Dec 1910); established the Sopwith Aviation Company with Fred Sigrist (1912); and a Sopwith floatplane won the secondSchneider Trophy race 1913). The company produced more than 18,000 aircraft during World War I, including the Sopwith Camel fighter. Post war co-founded Hawker Aircraft.
Eduard Spelterini	2 Jun 1852; 16 Jun 1931	Switzerland (France) (Switzerland) (Denmark)	Science; Aviator	Balloon	Licensed by the Académie d'Aérostation météorologique de France as a balloon pilot (1877); Swiss pioneer of ballooning and aerial photography; (Note: Spelterini began aerial photography in approximately 1893 and began taking a camera on his flights. Some highlights include Egypt (1904) and South Africa (1911).) multiple crossings of the Alps; assisted in medical research (1902). (Note: Took a Swiss professor to high altitude to conduct blood-related experiments (1902).)
Emile Taddéoli†	8 Mar 1879; 24 May 1920	Switzerland	Design; Construction; Aviator	Propeller	Swiss flight certificate No.2 (10 Oct 1910); pioneer of flying boats (e.g., SIAI S.13); chief seaplane pilot for Ad Astra Aero; first seaplane crossing of the Alps (12 Jul 1919); (†) (Savoia flying boat) demonstration flight, Romanshorn, Switzerland.
Shivkar Bapuji Talpade	1864; 1916	India	Design; Construction	?	Reportedly launched an unmanned airplane (Marutsakhā) (1895)
Czesław Tański	17 Jul 1862; 24 Feb 1942	Poland	Science; Design; Construction; Aviator	Glider; Rotor; Propeller	First successful model glider in Poland (1894); first glider flight in Poland (1896); biplane flight (1911).
Nicholas A. Teleshov (Note: AKA – Teleshova, Teleshev, Nicolas de Telescheff.)	1828; 1895	Russia	Science; Design; Construction	Propeller	Received patent (with Gustave de Struve) for a steam-engine powered “flying machine” capable of carrying 120 people (i.e., commercial passenger aircraft) (1864), and for a navigable balloon (1883).
E. Lilian Todd	1865; 26 Sep 1937	United States	Designer; Construction	Propeller	First female aircraft designer (c. 1906).
Juan Trippe	27 Jun 1899; 3 Apr 1981	United States	Manufacture(?); Support	n/a	Founded several airlines including Colonial Air Transport (1926) and the Aviation Corporation of the Americas (1927) which would become Pan American Airways; created economy class to encourage travel; proponent of jet aircraft ordering Boeing 707 and Douglas DC-8 aircraft; requested a larger airplane resulting in the Boeing 747; recipient, Tony Jannus Award (1965).
Jules Védrines	21 Dec 1881; 21 Apr 1919	France	Aviator	Propeller	First pilot to fly at more than 100 miles per hour (160 km/h) on 2 Feb 1912, won Gordon Bennett Trophy race in 1912 flying a Deperdussin Monocoque. †St Rambert d'Albon near Lyon en route for Rome flying a Caudron C-23.
Alfred V. Verville	16 Nov 1890; 10 Mar 1970	United States	Design; Manufacture; Support	Propeller	Designed the Verville-Packard R-1 (1919), which won the first Pulitzer Speed Trophy (1920); the M-1 Massenger (1921); the Verville-Sperry R-3 (1922), the second aircraft with retractable landing gear (after the Dayton-Wright RB-1 Racer); member, U.S. Navy Bureau of Aeronautics (1946–61).
Aurel Vlaicu†	19 Nov 1882; 13 Sep 1913	Romania	Design; Construction; Aviator	Glider; Propeller	Designed, built, and flew a glider (1909); a powered airplane Vlaicu Nr. I (17 Jun 1910); (†) Vlaicu Nr. II, near Câmpina, attempting to cross the Carpathian Mountains in flight for the first time. Vlaicu Nr. III, the world's first metal-built aircraft, was under construction at the time of his death, but was completed in early 1914 by his collaborators.
Gabriel Voisin	5 Feb 1880; 25 Dec 1973	France	Design; Construction; Manufacture; Aviator	Glider; Propeller	With brother Charles, built gliders for Ernest Archdeacon (1902); designed and constructed the first French powered aircraft (Voisin 1907 biplane) to achieve sustained controlled flight (1 Oct 1907); (Note: The Voisin 1907 biplane was flown by Henry Farman to win the Deutsch-Archdeacon Prize (13 January 1908).) founded Appareils d'Aviation Les Frères Voisin, the first aircraft manufacturing company (1906).
Traian Vuia	17 Aug 1872; 3 Sep 1950	Romania (France)	Design; Construction; Aviator(?)	Propeller; Rotor	Flight in tractor monoplane (France) (6 Mar 1906).
Preston Watson†	17 May 1880; 30 Jun 1915	Scotland	Design; Construction; Aviator	Glider; Propeller	On the eve of the 50th anniversary of the Wright Brothers’ historic flight (1953) and thirty-eight years after Watson's death, his brother James claimed that Preston had achieved powered flight before the Wrights. He recanted in 1955 stating he had never claimed it was powered flight.
Francis Herbert Wenham	1824; 1908	United Kingdom	Science; Constructor	Glider	The first scientist to deduce the main properties of cambered aerofoil. Built gliders and with John Browning the world's first wind tunnel in 1871.
John Weston	17 Jun 1872; 24 Jul 1950	South Africa	Design; Construction; Flying; Support	n/a	Regarded as "the grandfather of South African aviation” and “South Africa's first aviator”; 1907 to 1909, designed and constructed first aircraft built in South Africa; founder of Aeronautical Society of South Africa (AeSSA); 1911 to 1912, gave numerous flying demonstrations throughout southern Africa to popularise flight.
Gustave Whitehead (Weißkopf)	1 Jan 1874; 10 Oct 1927	Germany (United States)	Design; Construction; Aviator	Glider; Propeller	Designed and constructed a powered airplane (mid 1901); claims to have made the first (1899), second (14 Aug 1901), and third (17 Jan 1902) controlled powered airplane flights. This claim has long since been in dispute.
Jan Wnęk	1828; 10 Jul 1869	Poland	Design; Construction	Glider	Allegedly designed, constructed, flew a controllable glider (1866).
Wright brothers Orville and Wilbur	19 Aug 1871; 30 Jan 1948 and 16 Apr 1867; 30 May 1912	United States	Science; Design; Construction; Manufacture; Aviator; Support	Glider; Propeller	Together, designed and constructed biplane kite (1899); invented wing warping for flight control (c. 1899) and the aeronautical concept of three-axis control. designed and constructed the 1900, 1901, and 1902 Gliders; and the powered 1903 Flyer; used data from systematic wind tunnel testing to design efficient air foils and propellers; first powered, controlled, sustained flight (Orville) for 12 seconds covering 37 meters (17 Dec 1903) and documented; (Wilbur) first complete circle in a powered manned airplane (20 Sep 1904); (Wilbur) Wright Flyer III circular flight of 38.9 km (24 m) (23 Jun 1905).
Michèle Boni Yapi	4 Jul 1965; 24 Feb 2025	Ivory Coast	Aircraft; Maintenance; Technician	Aviation	Pioneer Ivorian aeronautical technician and one of the first female aircraft maintenance specialists in Ivory Coast.
Czesław Zbierański	6 Dec 1885; 31 May 1982	Poland (Poland) (United States)	Design; Construction; Aviator(?)	Propeller	With Stanislaw Cywiński designed and constructed Poland's first airplane (May 1911), flown (25 Sep 1911).

== See also ==
- History of aviation
- Timeline of women in aviation
