= Andrej Kvas =

- Born: 21 November 1883; Békéscsaba
- Died: 27 January 1974 (aged 90); Budapest
- Burial place: Budapest
- Other names: Kvasz András, Ondrej Kvas
- Citizenship: Hungarian
- Known for: pioneer of aviation, aircraft designer

Andrej Kvas (sometimes referred to as Ondrej Kvas, Hungarian: Kvasz András) was a Slovak and Hungarian pilot, aircraft designer and pioneer of aviation in Hungary.

He was born to a family of Lowland Slovaks from Békéscsaba. Following his father's example, he trained as a blacksmith. He and his brother opened a bicycle and motorcycle repair shop in Budapest, and at the same time he began experimenting with flying. In 1908, he was approached by the wealthy Hungarian engineer Aladár Koch-Zsélyi with an offer to design an aircraft according to his plans. Thanks to the support of Koch's parents, they were able to build the aircraft in a larger, rented hangar, instead of a small workshop of Kvas brothers. At the same time they were building the aircraft, famous Frenchman Louis Blériot was doing exhibition flights in Budapest. He let Kvas and Koch to inspect his aircraft. They completed the construction of their own aircraft in early 1910.

The Zsélyi I. was powered by a French 32-horsepower Darracgue twin-cylinder engine. During one of the test flights, however, it crashed and its wing was damaged. The aircraft was then rebuilt, what led to the creation of the aircraft Zsélyi II. They shortened the fuselage, and increased the wingspan. With this plane, Aladár Zsélyi as a pilot and designer won awards in Hungary, but later, he crashed during landing. He was seriously injured, and subsequently, he stopped flying, and continued to devote himself only to the construction.

Andrej Kvas had bought the crashed aircraft, and built a completely new aircraft from its parts, Kvas I. He later constructed several other aircraft, and several of its constructions were also put into service in the Austro-Hungarian Army. He then performed a series of exhibition flights with his aircraft to promote aviation. He made several exhibition planes across many Hungarian towns, and over many towns of current Slovakia, where he significantly contributed to the promotion of aviation. In 1914 he took part at an air show in Piešťany.

During the First World War, he served as a military pilot in the Austro-Hungarian Army. He was captured by the Russians on the Eastern Front. Upon his return, he became a soldier of the Hungarian Soviet Republic. After it was defeated, he had withdrawn from the public life. He died on 27 January 1974 in Budapest, where he is also buried.

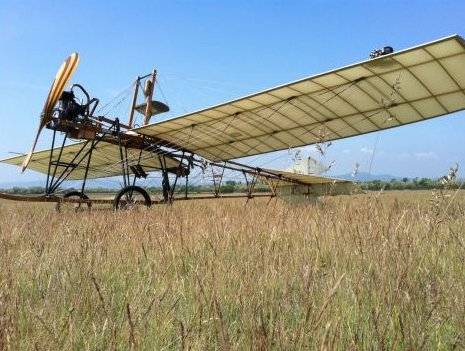
Replica of the aircraft Kvas I.

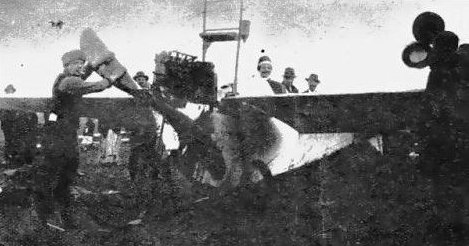
Kvas II. aircraft

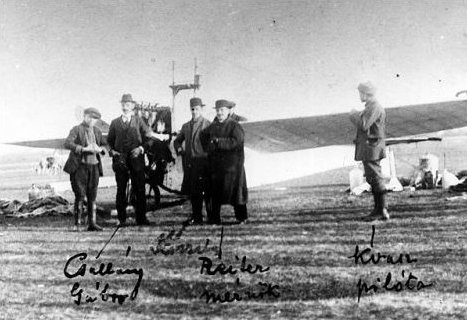
Kvas II. aircraft

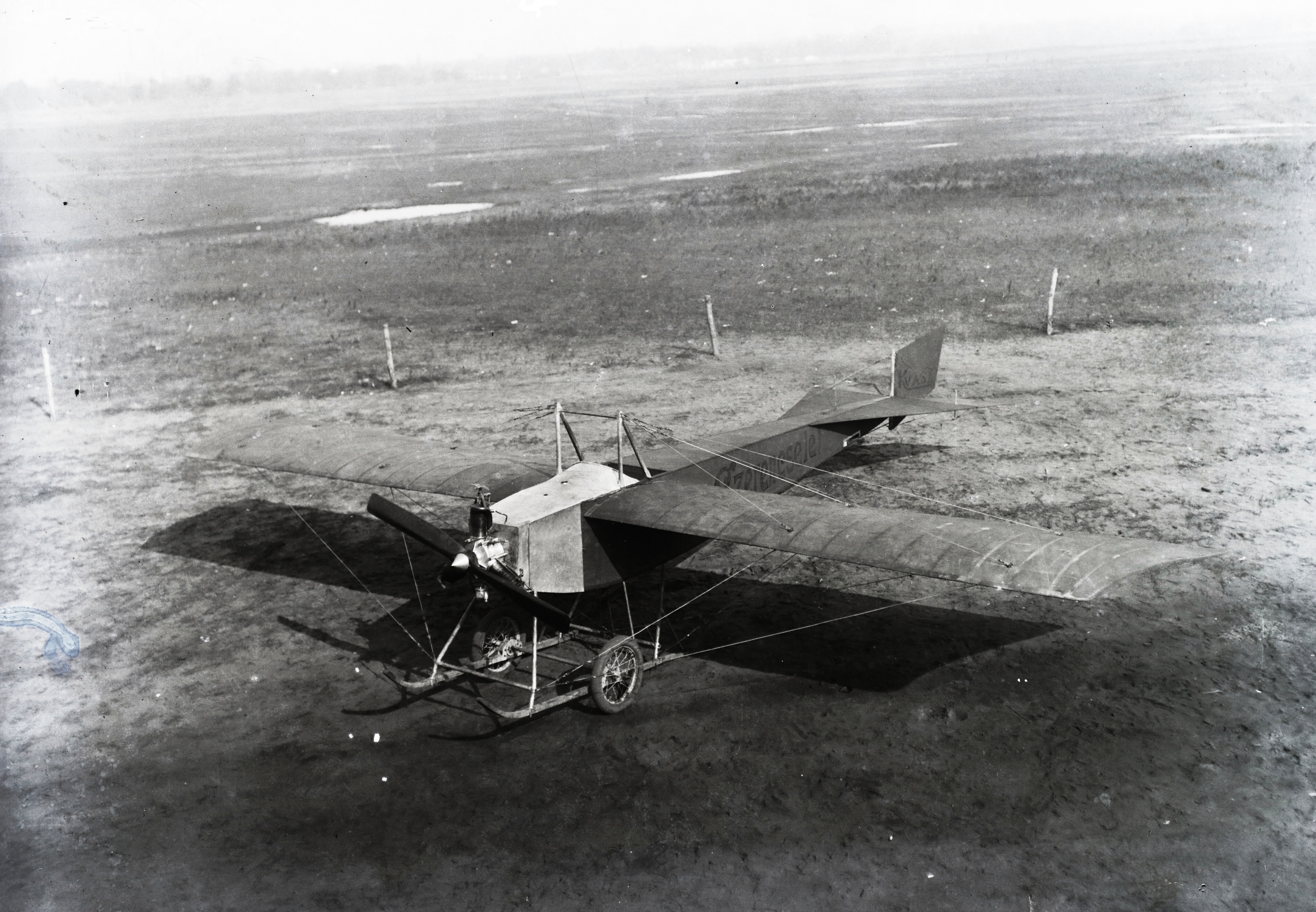
Aircraft constructed by Andrej Kvas

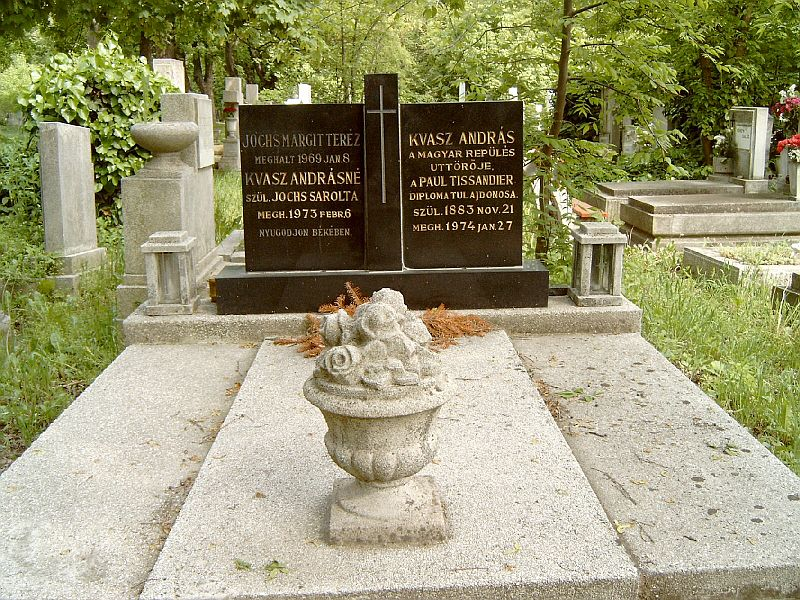
The tombstone of Andrej Kvas in Budapest

== Sources ==
- Koch a Kvas - Zakladatelia letectva v Uhorsku (slovak), oslovma.hu
- Z histórie (česko)slovenského letectva. Lietadlo Andreja Kvasza (slovak), cudzis.blog.sme.sk
- Ondrej Kvas - priekopník slovenského letectva (slovak), RTVS
- Prvým slovenským pilotom bol báječný človek Andrej Kvas (slovak), pravda.sk
