= Tryggve Gran =

Norwegian aviator, polar explorer and author

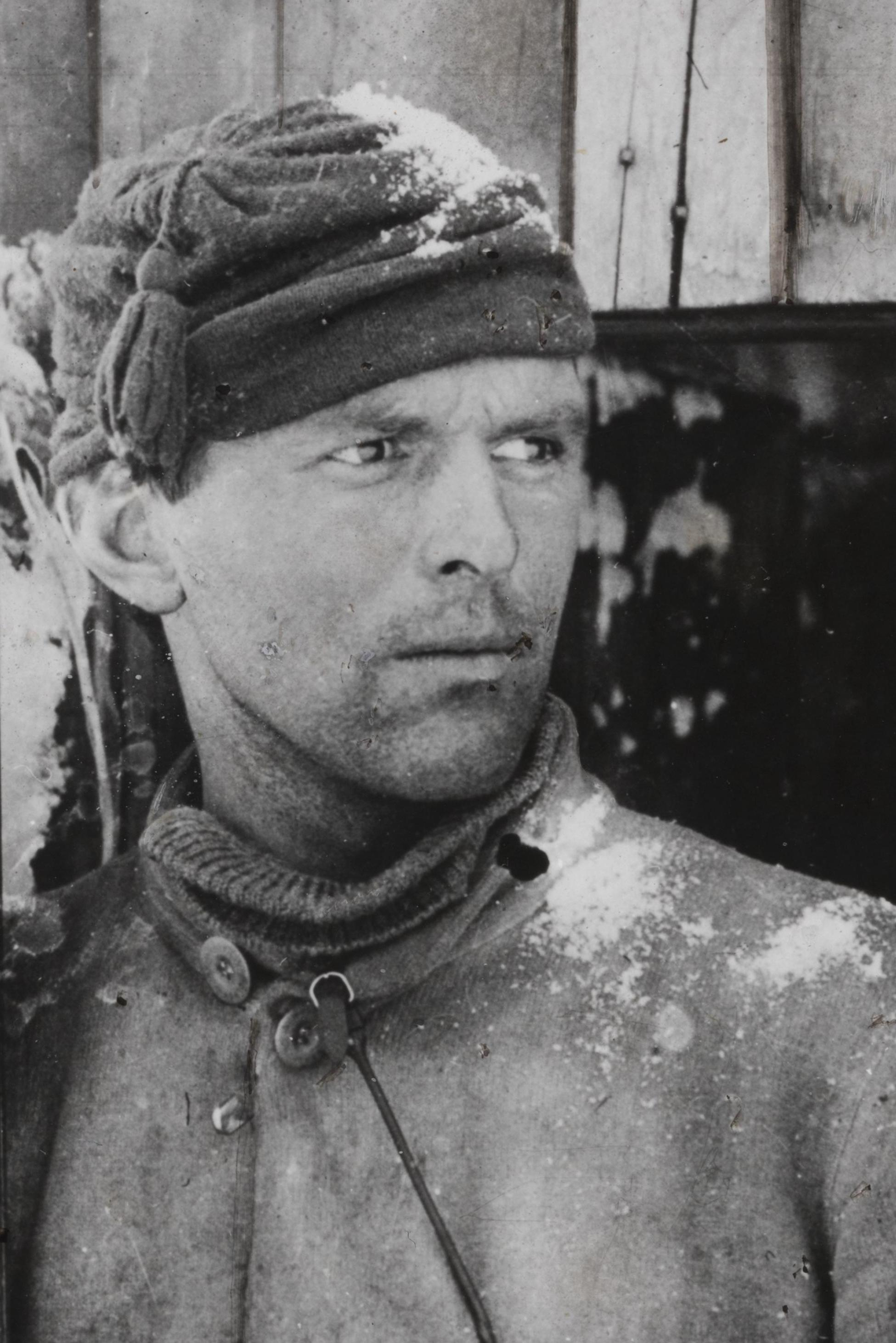
- Tryggve Gran around 1912–1913
- Born: Jens Tryggve Herman Gran; 20 January 1888; Bergen, Norway
- Died: 8 January 1980 (aged 91); Grimstad, Norway
- Resting place: Fjære Church, Grimstad, Norway
- Monuments: Memorial plaque at Cruden Bay, Scotland
- Known for: Aviator, Polar explorer and author
- Spouse(s): Lilian Clara Johnson (m. 1918–1921) (div.) Ingeborg Meinich (m. 1923) (div.) Margaret Schønheyder (m. 1941–1980)
- Awards: Military Cross
- Aviation career
- First flight: Bleriot XI
- Famous flights: First heavier-than-air flight across the North Sea (Scotland to Norway, 30 July 1914)
- Flight license: 2 August 1917
- Air force: Royal Norwegian Navy Air Service; Royal Flying Corps; Royal Air Force
- Battles: Defence of London (1917); Western Front (1917); North Russia Campaign (1918)
- Rank: Acting Major (Acting Squadron Leader)

Jens Tryggve Herman Gran MC (20 January 1888 – 8 January 1980) was a Norwegian aviator, polar explorer and author.

He was the skiing expert on the 1910–13 Scott Antarctic Expedition and was the first person to fly across the North Sea from Scotland to Norway in a heavier-than-air aircraft in August 1914. During WW1 he joined the Royal Flying Corps and flew night bombing raids on the Western Front, for which he was awarded the Military Cross. He co-piloted the first flight from London via Oslo to Stockholm in 1920.

During WWII he aligned himself with Vidkun Quisling's ruling party, and was sentenced to 18 months in prison in 1948.

== Early life ==
Tryggve Gran was born in Bergen, Norway, growing up in an affluent family dominant in the shipbuilding industry. His great-grandfather Jens Gran Berle (1758–1828), had founded a shipyard in the Laksevåg borough of the city of Bergen. His father, Jens Gran (1828–94) who had inherited the shipbuilding business, died when Tryggve was only five years old. In 1900, after school in Bergen and Lillehammer, Gran was sent to a school in Lausanne, Switzerland for a year, where he learned some German and French. Three years later, he met the German emperor, Wilhelm II, a common guest with the families of Tryggve's friends. Meeting the emperor made an impact on the then 14-year-old boy, who from that moment on wanted to become a naval officer. At this time, he had several years behind him as a member of the Nygaards Battalion, one of Bergen's buekorps. He entered the Royal Norwegian Naval Academy in 1907 and graduated in the spring of 1910.

== Career ==
=== Polar exploration ===
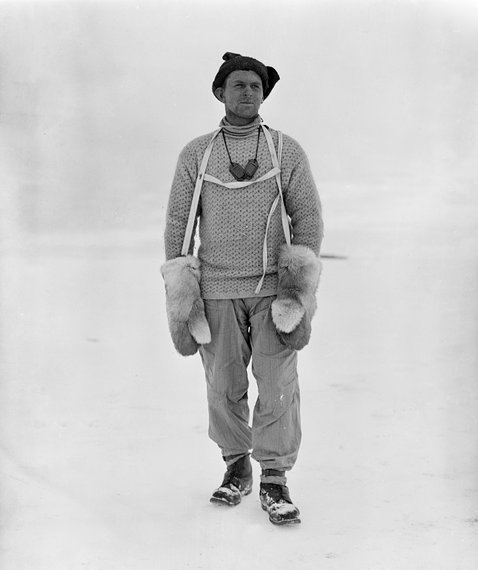
Tryggve Gran in Antarctica (1911)

Gran took an interest in science and exploration which in 1910 led to Fridtjof Nansen recommending his services to Robert Falcon Scott, who was in Norway at the time preparing for an expedition to the Antarctic and testing the motor tractor he intended to take with him. Scott was impressed with Gran, who was an expert skier, and Nansen convinced Scott to take Gran as ski instructor to Scott's men for the Terra Nova Expedition.

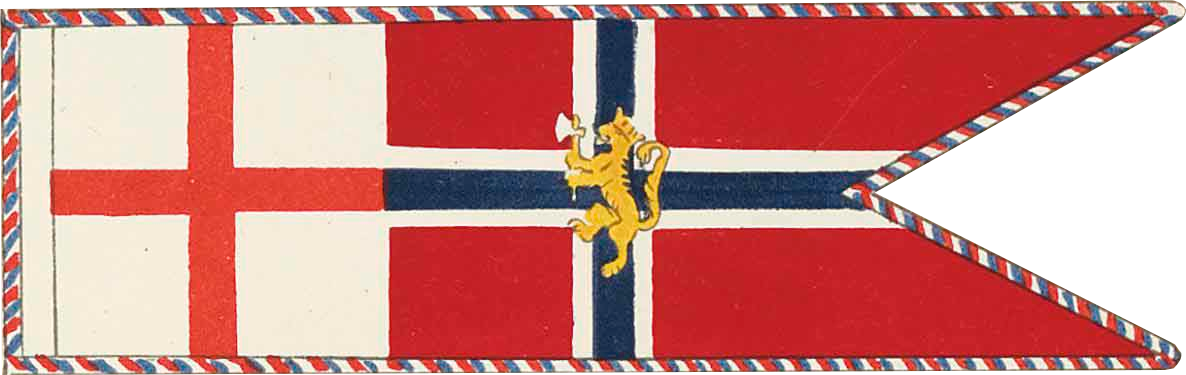
Sledge flag used by Gran in Antarctica during the Terra Nova Expedition

Arriving in Antarctica in early January 1911, Gran was one of the 13 expedition members involved in the laying of the supply depots needed for the attempt to reach the South Pole later that year. From November 1911 to February 1912, while Scott and the rest of the Southern party were on their journey to the Pole, Gran accompanied the geological expedition to the western mountains led by Griffith Taylor.

In November 1912, Gran was part of the 11-man search party that found the tent containing the dead bodies of the past South Pole party. After collecting the party's personal belongings the tent was lowered over the bodies of Scott and his two companions and a 12-foot snow cairn was built over it. A pair of skis were used to form a cross over their grave. Gran travelled back to the base at Cape Evans wearing Scott's skis, reasoning that at least Scott's skis would complete the journey. Before leaving Antarctica he made an ascent of Mount Erebus with Raymond Priestley and Frederick Hooper in December 1912, an occasion which nearly ended in disaster when an unexpected eruption caused a shower of huge pumice blocks to fall around him. On 24 July 1913 Gran was awarded the Polar Medal by King George V.

=== Aviation: crossing the North Sea ===
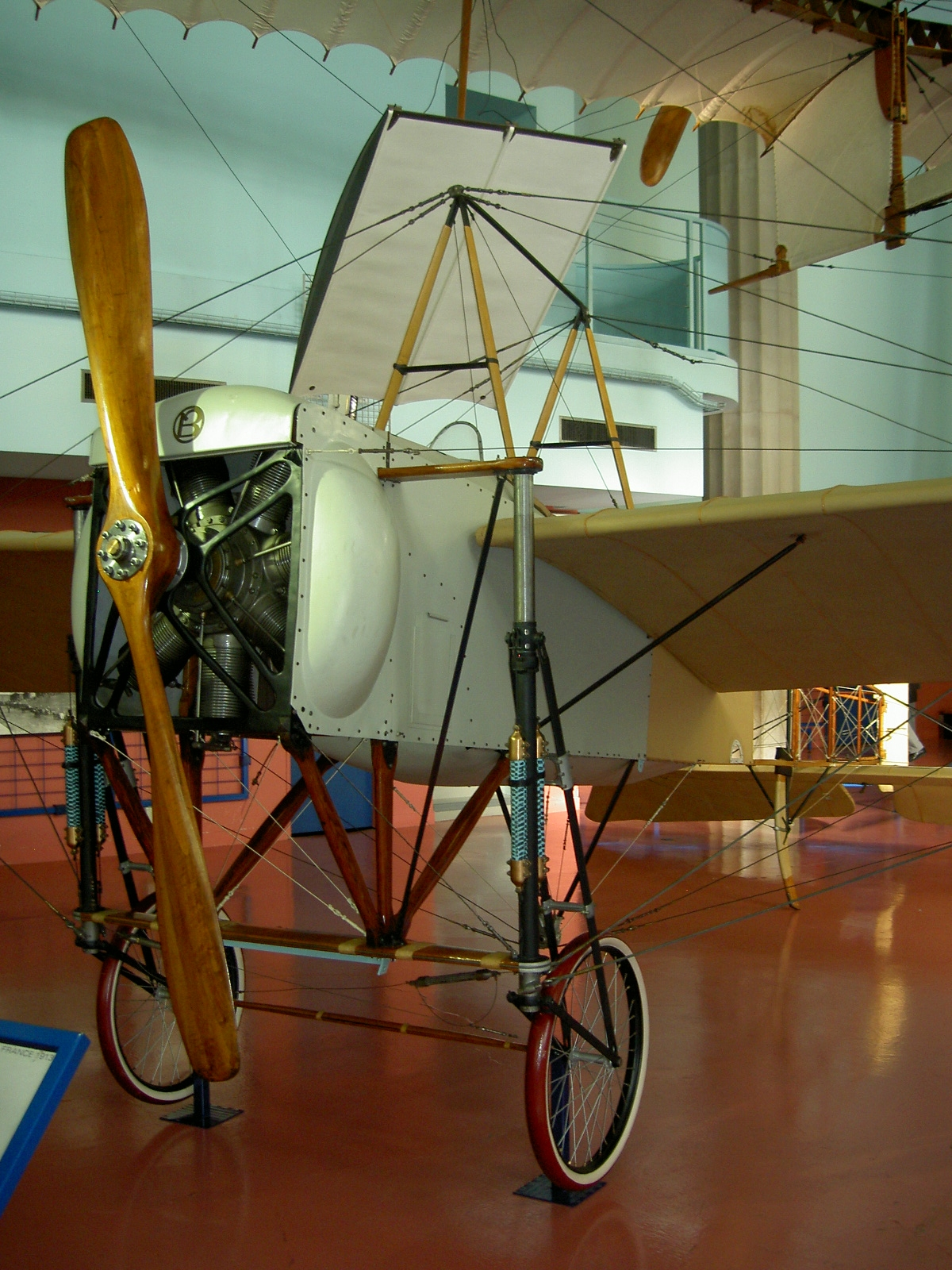
Blériot XI-2, Gran's record-breaking aircraft

On his return voyage, Gran met aviator Robert Loraine, the first pilot to cross the Irish Sea, and immediately took an interest in aviation. According to his own words in a newspaper report, Gran learned to fly in early 1913 at Hendon Aerodrome at the Temple School of Aviation, but seems not to have gained his British Aviator's Certificate at the time. His instructor, George Lee Temple (who also taught Max Le Verrier, who flew in Escadrille 112 during the war) died in a flying accident in 1914 aged only 21. (Note: Temple taught himself to fly, was the first Briton to fly upside down in the UK, and the youngest to fly from Paris to London at the time. He established an aviation school, but in the summer of 1913 he sold his interest in it in favour of exhibition flying. He died in 1914 aged only 21 - he felt unwell while flying a Blériot XI (50 hp Gnome) at Hendon, lost consciousness, his head hit the stick and the aeroplane dived into the ground.) (Note: It appears that the Temple School merged with the J. Laurence Hall School in 1913 (they were right next door to each other), and advertisements for the Hall School included Gran as a pupil.)

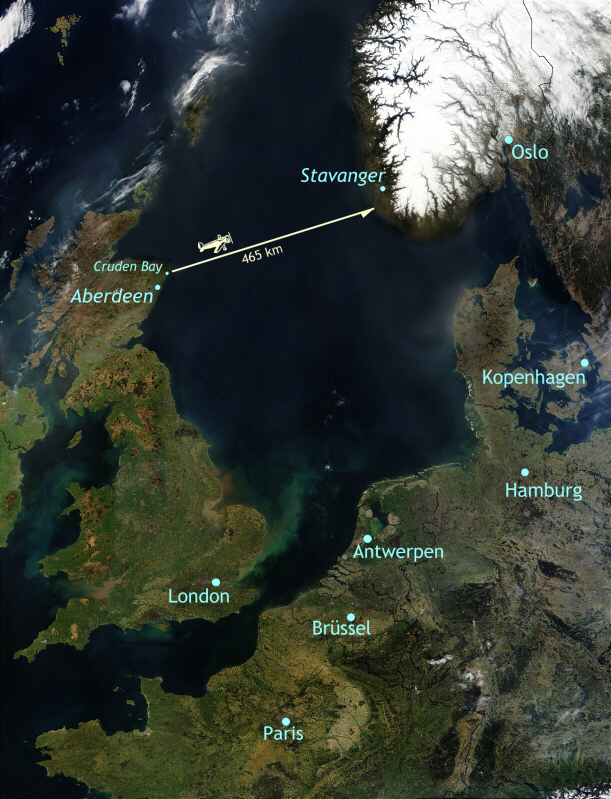
Map of Gran's flight

He went to France and bought a two-seater Blériot XI-2 "Artillerie", from Blériot Aéronautique with an 80 hp Gnome engine for 20,000 francs. At the Blériot school at Buc he was one of the first to loop the loop and fly upside down. (Note: This was first achieved by Pyotr Nesterov who looped a Nieuport IV on September 9, 1913. Adolphe Pégoud did the same at Buc on 21 September 1913.)

On 30 July 1914 Gran became the first pilot to cross the North Sea. Taking off in his Blériot XI-2 monoplane, named Ca Flotte (it was equipped with air cushions in case of ditching) from Cruden Bay, Scotland, Gran landed 4 hours 10 minutes later at Jæren, near Stavanger, Norway, after a flight of 320 miles (510 km). This record-breaking achievement, the longest flight over water to date by a heavier-than air machine, (Note: Longer flights had been made: for example, Roland Garros flew non-stop across the Mediterranean in September 1913 from Fréjus, France, to Bizerte, Tunisia in a flight lasting nearly eight hours, but he overflew Sardinia for much of the way.) was overshadowed by the outbreak of World War I only five days later.

Gran flew the Blériot on service in Norway during WW1. It was exhibited at the 1918 Christiana Aero Show on the stand of Enoch Thulin's Aeroplane Works, AB Thulinverken. The restored, but complete and original plane is on display at the Norwegian Museum of Science and Technology in Oslo, Norway.

=== First World War ===
Gran joined the newly formed Norwegian Army Air Service as a Lieutenant on 3 August 1914, and his Bleriot XI was bought by the government. In spring 1915 he was flying aggressive patrols against German U-boats in his Blériot (renamed Nordsøen) from a small beach in Western Norway.

"Suddenly the hum of a Gnome is heard, and like a great bird a Blériot two-seater comes into view, sailing closely over the top of the mountains. It swoops down until its wheels nearly touch the sea, and as it whirrs past, Lieut. Gran and his observer are seen to make signs which can only be interpreted as a polite but firm request to 'get out.'"

Gran had flown more than 3,000 km (1,900 mi) over the sea from the start of the war, on one occasion covering a distance of nearly 400 km (250 mi). On 9 September 1915, Gran made a flight in his Blériot from Elvenes in Salangen Municipality in northern Norway, within the Arctic Circle. Later that year he was sent to Britain and France to study air defence.

By March 1916, nothing had been heard of Ernest Shackleton's Imperial Trans-Antarctic Expedition since December 1914, and he offered to go on a relief ship to search for the Ross Sea party and the Aurora. However, the Aurora arrived in New Zealand in April, and Shackleton managed to reach South Georgia in May, and the relief ship was not needed. A newspaper report of the same date claimed that he was now a lieutenant in the Royal Norwegian Navy Air Service.

On 18 October 1916 he was back in Norway, and persuaded the Norwegian Minister of War Christian Holtfodt to be allowed to volunteer for the Royal Flying Corps (RFC), and obtain lessons in night flying. Returning to London, he was interviewed at the Norwegian Legation and then by Lt-Col. Felton Holt, Officer Commanding, 16th/Home Defence Wing RFC. It was agreed that to circumvent the problem of his neutral Norwegian nationality, he would be given a commission under the assumed identity of "Teddy Grant", a Canadian aviator.

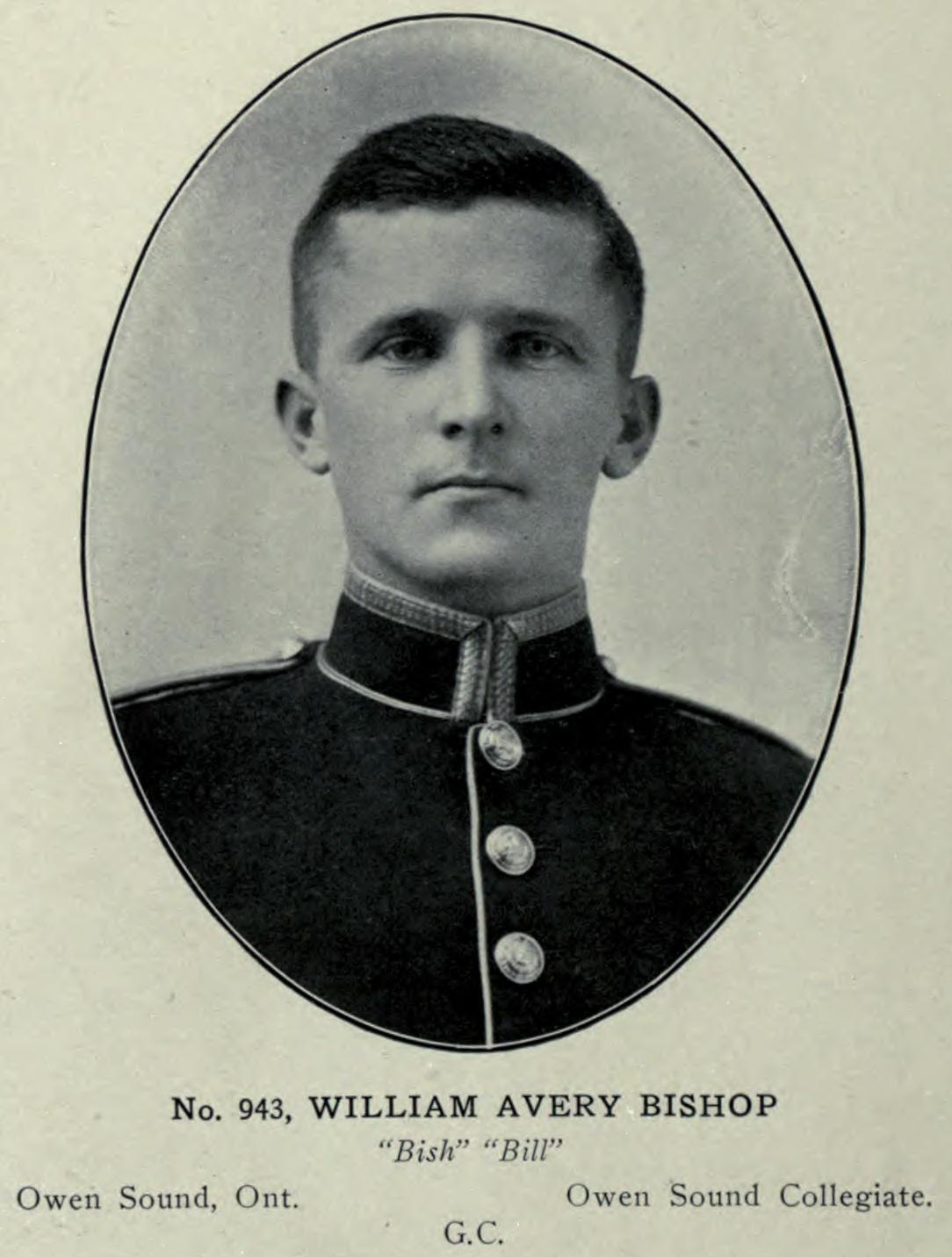
Cadet Billy Bishop in 1914

In the event he was commissioned on 1 January 1917 as a probationary temporary second lieutenant in the RFC. He was initially assigned to 11 Reserve Training Squadron, part of the London Air Defence Area, based at RAF Northolt. (Note: (Jones 1931, pp. 169–71) [pdf 201-3], including map of Home Defence squadron locations.) At 11 Reserve Training Squadron he received more flying lessons from Lieutenant B. F. Moore, an old acquaintance from Gran's flying days at Hendon in 1913. He "personally took my instruction in hand, and after some flights with him at the helm, I finally took the driver's seat myself." (Note: This was (later Major) Barry Fitzgerald Moore, Pilot's licence no. 567, (Grahame-White Biplane, Grahame-White School, Hendon), 21 July 1913.)

Gran was swiftly made an instructor. By chance, Billy Bishop had been posted to the same Training Squadron a month earlier in December 1916, for further lessons before joining his official unit, 37 Squadron. Bishop had previously been an observer and had learned to fly at RAF Upavon from September 1916. Bishop's extreme antipathy towards discipline led him into severe conflict with his Commanding Officer (CO). Gran's arrival may well saved Bishop's career as a pilot. They apparently got on well, and as a result of Gran's intercedings with his CO, Bishop only received a severe reprimand and was posted to 37 Squadron (Home Defence) and then in March 1917 to 60 Squadron in France, where he won the VC.

What seems to be a barely-concealed official excuse for Gran's permission to join the RFC appeared in a Norwegian newspaper: "It's a curious story that comes from the Christiania Dagblad regarding Lieut. Tryggve Gran, who will be remembered by his aeroplane flight over the North Sea some little time ago. Lieut. Gran has been, it is stated, ordered to resign his commission in the Norwegian Flying Corps for having appeared in uniform in a foreign country, it being added that he will probably become a naturalised British subject and join the British Flying Corps."

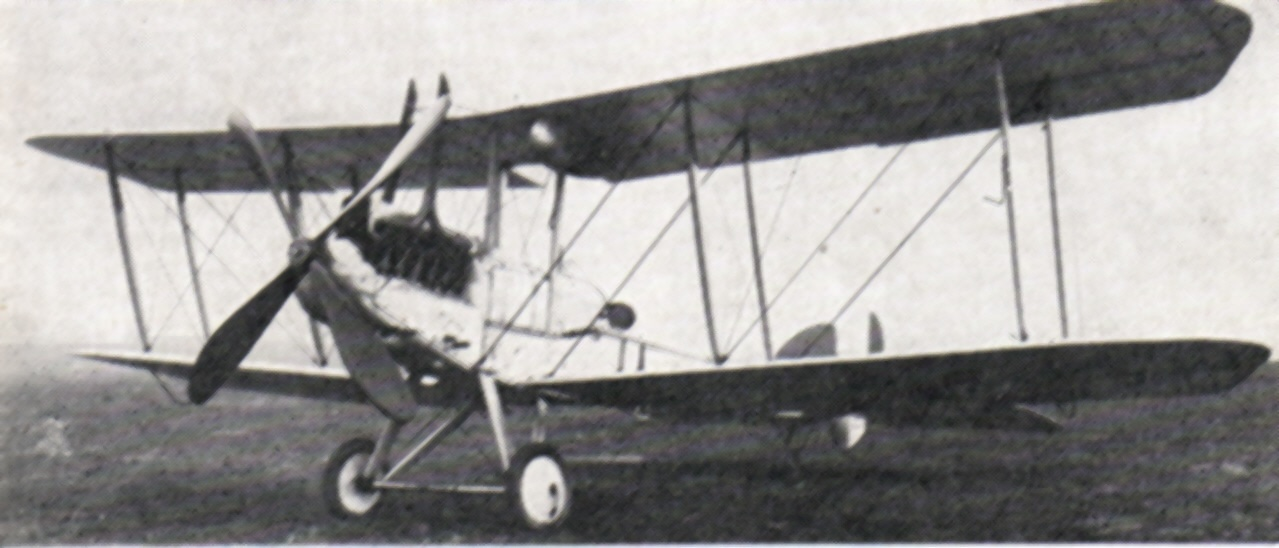
Royal Aircraft Factory B.E.12

Gran was confirmed in his rank and appointed a Flying Officer on 1 March 1917. He was posted to B flight of 39 Squadron based at RFC Sutton's Farm in the London Air Defence Area, part of the Home Defence wing. 39 Squadron usually flew Royal Aircraft Factory B.E.2s and B.E.12s, but the unit operated at least one Armstrong Whitworth F.K.8., the type which Gran would later fly to make the first (indirect) flight from London to Stockholm via Kristiania.

The squadron flew against Zeppelin and Schütte-Lanz airships, which resumed their attacks in mid-March 1917, and also Gothas such as the Gotha G.V, and 'Giant' Riesenflugzeug bombers. On 13 June Gran was airborne in a B.E.12, (Note: B.E.12 No. 6488, built by Daimler, works no. 4515.) from RFC North Weald (another 39 Sqn airfield) when he narrowly failed to shoot down a Gotha.

On 24 July 1917 he was posted to the recently formed 44 Squadron, also part of Home Defence, based at Hainault Farm, Ilford, Essex (later RAF Fairlop), flying Sopwith Camels. His Commanding Officer was Major (later Wing Commander) T. O’B. Hubbard. It's not entirely clear how Gran managed to progress as far as he did without a valid pilot's license, but on 2 August 1917 he finally received Royal Aero Club Aviators' Certificate No. 5000.

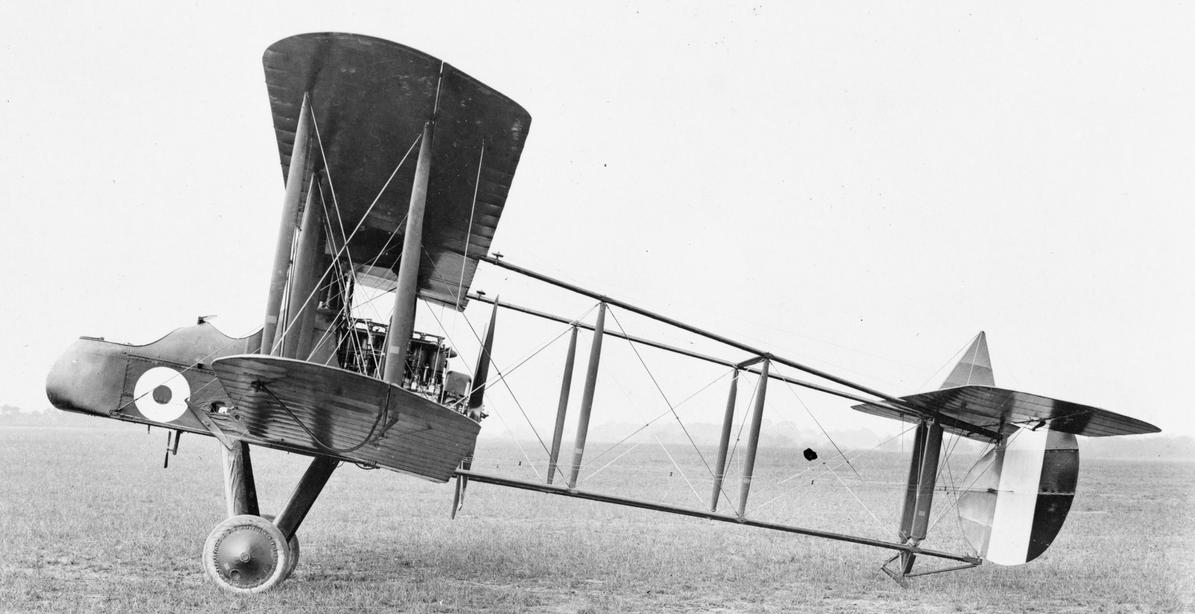
Royal Aircraft Factory FE2b, similar to the aircraft Gran flew

On 28 August 1917 Gran was assigned to the newly formed 101 Squadron on the Western Front in France. He was briefly sent to 70 Squadron - apparently a staging post before joining his official unit - arriving there on 1 September 1917. A few days later he was with 101 Squadron, flying Royal Aircraft Factory F.E.2b/d night fighters. The squadron was stationed at Clairmarais aerodrome (a satellite airfield for RFC Saint-Omer) from 31 August 1917 to 2 February 1918. The CO was Major the Hon. Laurence Twisleton-Wykeham-Fiennes, the second son of 18th Baron Saye and Sele.

101 Squadron flew night bombing missions with F.E.2bs during Battle of Menin Road, 3rd Battle of Ypres and the Battle of Cambrai. (Note: For further information: Menin Road Ridge - (Jones 1934, pp. 186–8); Polygon Wood - (Jones 1934, pp. 191, 194, 197). Rumbeke, October 21st 1917, (near Roeselare, NE of Ypres) - (Jones 1934, pp. 208–9, 211). Maps, (Jones 1934, pp. 137, 212, 227, 244) although none show 101 Squadron, being stationed too far to the west.) Gran carried out 17 night bombing raids. On 30 November 1917, 101 squadron's targets were Cambrai, Dechy, and Marquion. That night he was badly wounded in the leg by anti-aircraft fire ('Archie') while flying over occupied territory, managed to land just inside Allied lines and hospitalised. He returned to England from 16 December 1917 and recovered in the Royal Free Hospital. He was awarded the Military Cross (gazetted 26 March 1918) for his exploits.

In his book recounting his wartime experiences, Gran reproduces three letters dated August to October 1917 from James McCudden "in his own handwriting", but omits to mention that he wasn't the original recipient. The letters were apparently sent to Gran's friend 2nd Lt. Lester (Larry) Carter, who later flew with Gran to Norway in June 1920 in an Armstrong Whitworth F.K.8.

He was appointed a Flight Commander on 1 January 1918 with the rank of acting captain, by which time he was able to walk with crutches. and in March his seniority as second lieutenant was backdated to 1 January 1917. On 20 March 1918 he got permission to go to Norway for a few weeks to recover from his foot/leg injury, and a few days later he was awarded the Military Cross. His citation reads:

T./Capt. Tryggve Gran, Gen. List and R.F.C.
For conspicuous gallantry and devotion to duty. He bombed enemy aerodromes with great success, and engaged enemy searchlights, transport and other targets with machine-gun fire. He invariably showed the greatest determination and resource.

He was married to his first wife on 29 April 1918, reportedly wearing the Mons Star, although it seems unlikely that he was entitled to it.

He was promoted acting major (squadron commander) on 10 September 1918, and received an offer to go to northern Russia to lead a flying detachment of the Royal Air Force during the Allied intervention in the North Russia Campaign. On 20 September 1918 he departed from Dundee, arriving in Arkhangelsk ten days later, although he does not appear to have achieved much. In his memoirs he does not mention meeting Sir Ernest Shackleton, who was also there from October 1918. In October his leg wound was troubling him in the extreme cold, and the RFC doctor advised him to get a transfer. He returned to Norway on 8 November, a few days before the Armistice. Gran was temporarily transferred to the RAF unemployed list on 26 April 1919.

=== Attempt at first non-stop trans-Atlantic flight ===
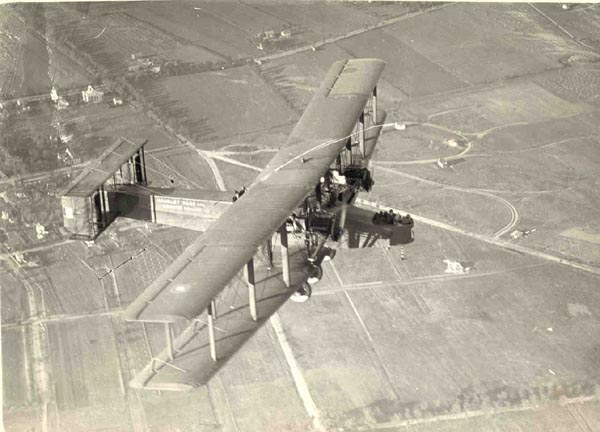
The V-1500 'Atlantic' during its onward flight from New York to Chicago (1919)

He immediately joined the crew of Handley Page's entry, a V/1500 four-engined bomber, in the Daily Mail's Transatlantic Air Race, which had been postponed during the war. The pilot was Major Herbert G. Brackley, (Note: Brackley had been taught to fly by Jack Alcock who was instructing at the RNAS Eastchurch flying school.) and the co-pilot was recently retired Admiral Mark Kerr, the first Naval Flag Officer to become a pilot. Gran was the navigator and relief pilot. During testing in Harbour Grace, Newfoundland in May 1919, the engines boiled over because of faulty radiators. While the team was waiting for the latest radiators to arrive from England Alcock and Brown (who had arrived on 24 May 1919), had assembled their Vickers Vimy, tested it, and taken off on 14 June to win the competition. (Note: An oft-repeated claim that the Handley Page crashed in the Bay of Fundy in Maine appears to be a figment of Gran's fevered imagination. This statement, along with a number of other fanciful assertions by the 86-year old Gran, appeared in an uncritical article in The Observer colour magazine for 31 March 1974.)

A publicity stunt organised by Handley Page to fly the V/1500 straight to New York in early July 1919 was cut short when the aircraft suffered overheating engines again and crashed at Parrsboro racecourse, Nova Scotia. The navigator's seat from the V/1500 is in the Ottawa House Museum, Parrsboro. The repairs were going to take three months, and on 1 August Gran was granted a permanent commission in the RAF with the rank of captain. He returned to the UK; the V/1500 eventually made it to New York in October 1919.

=== Flights to Scandinavia ===
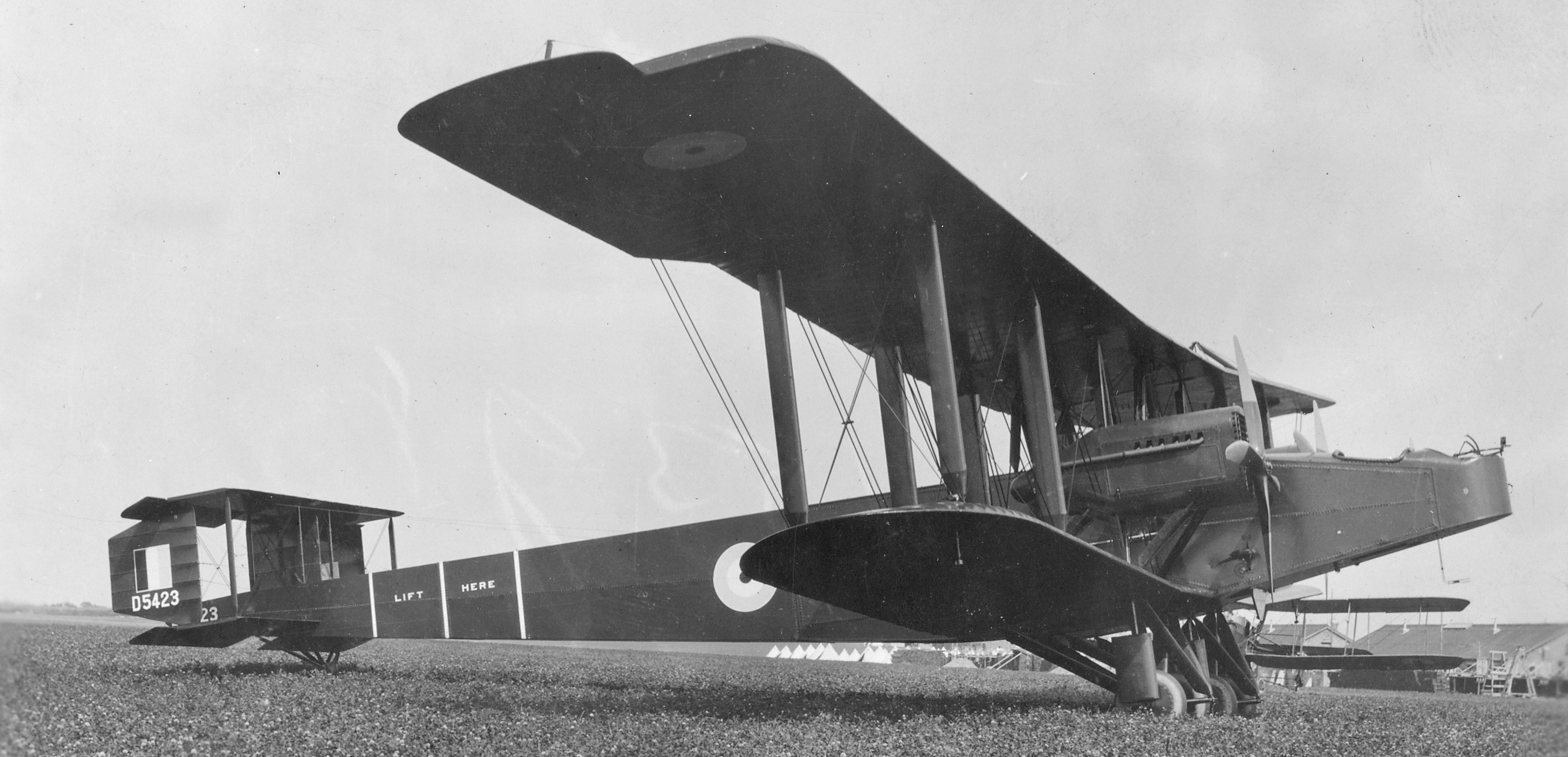
A Handley Page O/400 similar to the one Gran flew to Norway

In 1918 Handley Page (HP) and no:Wilhelm Meisterlin (HP's general agent in Norway) had already planned to form an Anglo-Norwegian airline company, flying from Kristiania to Gothenburg and Copenhagen. HP was also going to run scheduled flights from Copenhagen to London. In order to test this route, Gran and Captain J. Stewart flew a Handley Page O/400 (G-EAKE) on 16 August 1919 from London via Soesterberg to the Danish Army airport Kløvermarken near Copenhagen; then on to Århus, and Kjeller Airport near Kristiania. The first flight from Kristiania to Stockholm was planned, and on 6 September the O/400 with Stewart, Gran and his English wife as a passenger took off from Kjeller. But the Handley-Page crashed shortly after takeoff with a seized engine; no-one was injured and the aircraft was badly damaged although repairable. Gran returned to the UK and his commission was cancelled again on 2 December 1919.

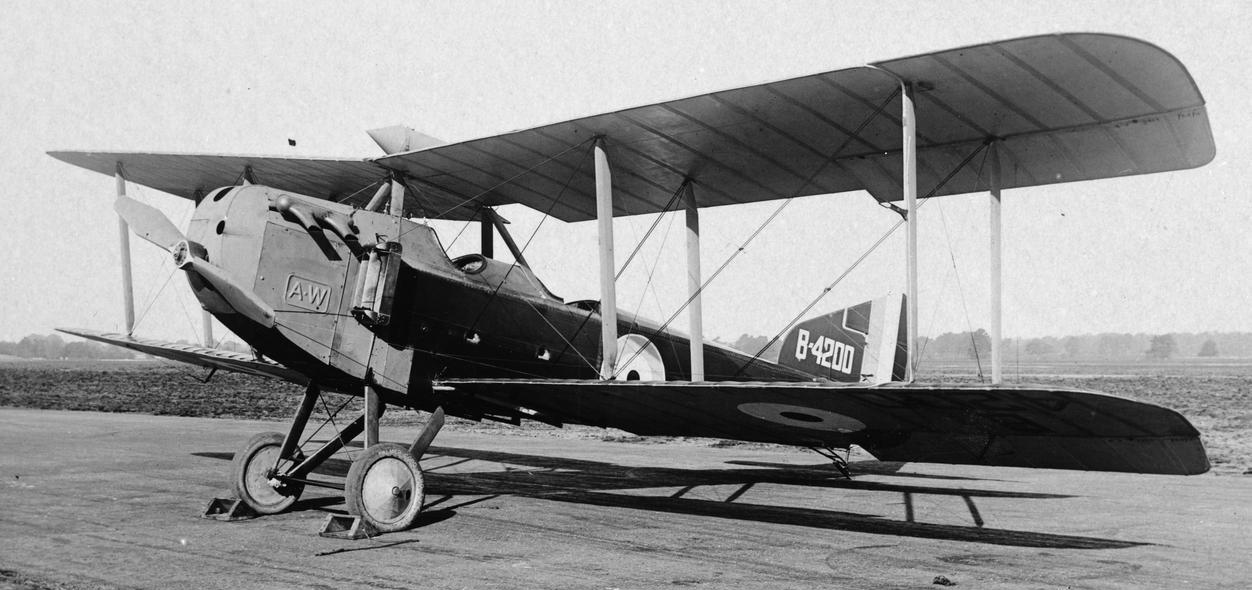
An Armstrong Whitworth F.K.8 similar to the one which Gran and Carpenter flew from London to Stockholm

A friend of Gran's, Captain Larry Carter, had bought an ex-RAF Armstrong Whitworth F.K.8 with the idea of flying it non-stop to Sweden. The F.K.8 was registered as a civil aircraft to Gran on 9 June 1920: they set off from Dover on 17 June, and arrived at Århus after several delays on 23 June. News came from Norway that the O/400 had been repaired in Kjeller after the winter, and they changed the plan to be the first to fly from Kristiania to Stockholm. Crossing the Skaggerak they arrived in Kjeller in the early hours of 25 June. The final leg of the journey continued in the permanent twilight of the night of 24-25 June 1920, when Carter and Gran flew from Kjeller to Stockholm in slightly over 2½ hours: they thus became the first to fly (somewhat indirectly) from London to Stockholm. The Handley Page O/400 arrived from Norway the next evening. A return race was planned, and on 30 June Gran and Carter took off. However, the engine caught fire over Örebro, and after a forced landing they extinguished the fire. On taking off again, however, the F.K.8 nosed over and was wrecked although the pair of flyers received only relatively minor injuries. (Note: Meisterlin still had plans to start up an airline service, but on 30 June 1920 at the end of a demonstration flight form Kjeller to Stockholm in the attempted company of a Norman Thompson N.T.2B flying boat the O/400 G-EAKA got lost and made a safe emergency landing in a cornfield near Stockholm. On take-off the next day, however, the tall corn interfered with the wings and wrapped itself around the undercarriage: the aircraft nosed over, and one person sustained severe burns.)

=== RAF flying instructor ===
Gran received another commission as a Flight Lieutenant on 22 September 1920. He joined the staff of the Air Pilotage School (variously No. 2 Navigation School, later School of Aerial Navigation) at RAF Andover that month. Another instructor at Andover was Flying Officer (later Wing Commander) Aubrey R. M. Rickards.

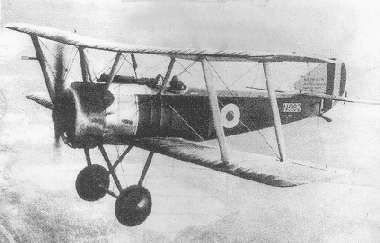
A Sopwith Pup in flight, 1917

While flying together, Rickards and Gran were forced down by bad weather and landed at Waddon (later Croydon Airport) where the Aircraft Disposals Company was being managed by Handley Page. They had a look round at the war surplus aircraft, and they both subsequently bought a Sopwith Pup. Pup G-EAVW (works No. C312) was registered to Gran on 27 October 1920, while Rickards bought G-EAVX. It appears that they tried to fly their Pups together to Norway via Holland in December 1920, but the prevailing wind forced them to Newcastle, where they caught a steamship to Norway. (Note: Rickards later died in an air crash in October 1938, while serving in Oman. Rickard's Sopwith Pup, the only surviving wartime example, is now being restored.)

In the spring of 1921 Gran was in collision with a motorcycle in London and injured his left leg so severely that he was unable to resume active flying, and he returned home to Norway. (Note: The registration of Gran's Pup G-EAVW appears to have been cancelled in December 1921.) Gran finally relinquished his commission on 6 August 1921.

In May 1922 Gran travelled with the future Olympic skiers Thorleif Haug and Jacob Tullin Thams to Svalbard to prepare for a ski trip across the ice sheet. From Ny-Ålesund they were to go skiing and sledding for a month to "study the country, the equipment and ourselves"; at the same time they were to shoot a film about Svalbard. This time Gran did not manage to raise enough money for two planes and equipment, and the trip was abandoned.

== Later civilian career ==
After the war, Gran started holding lectures on aviation and his journeys to the polar areas, as well as writing books. In 1928, he sailed on the Veslekari as part of a concerted effort to search for the polar explorer Roald Amundsen, lost flying while trying to discover the fate of Umberto Nobile's North Pole expedition on board the Airship Italia.

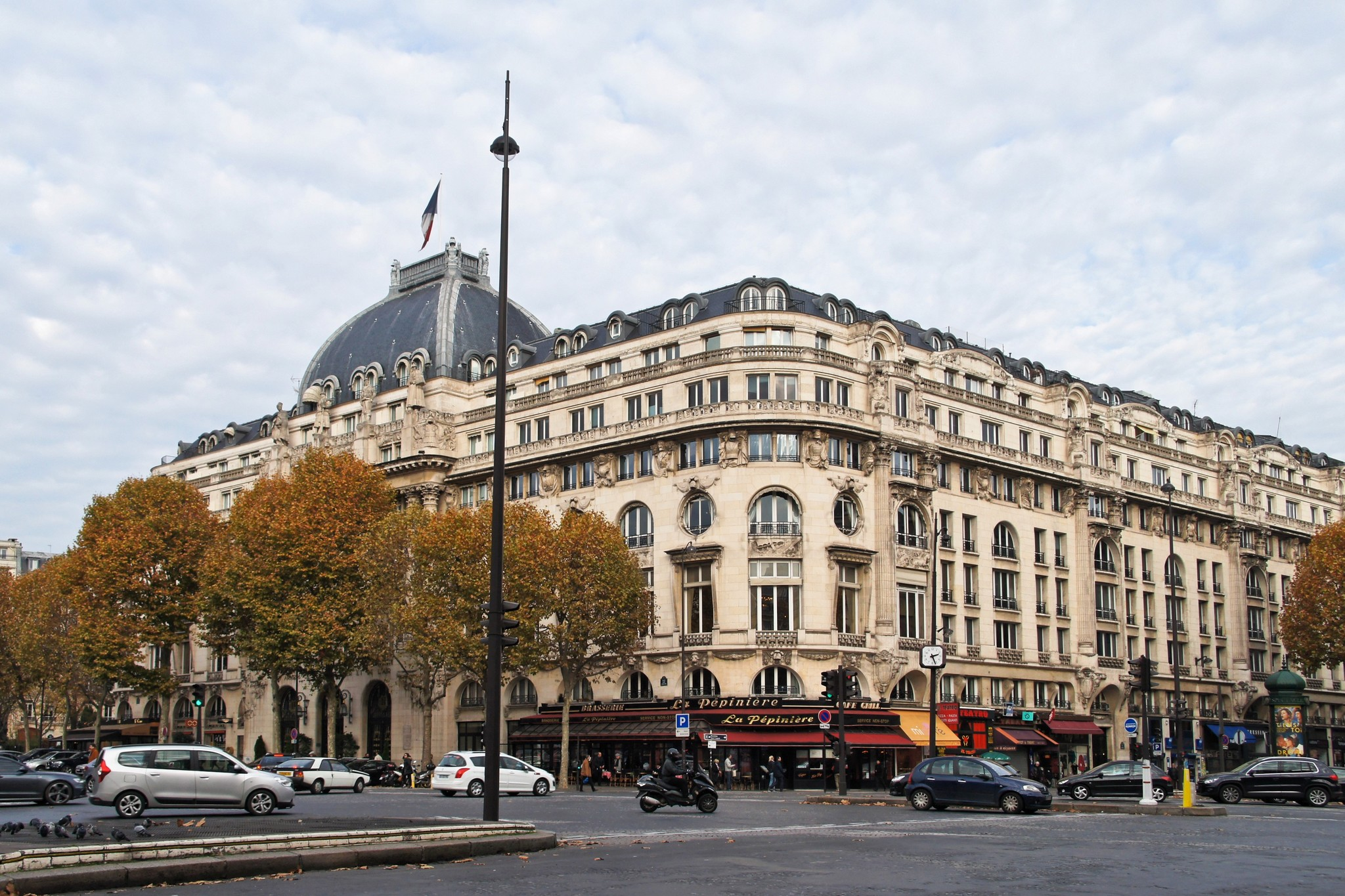
Cercle national des armées, Paris, where Gran was awarded the Légion d'honneur

In 1931 Gran proposed a solo attempt to reach the South Pole on a motorcycle.

Gran received the Cross of the Légion d'honneur in 1934. It was awarded on 24 July by General Denain, French Air Minister at the fr:Cercle Militaire, on the occasion of a dinner given by the minister. Gran and other Norwegian flyers were in Paris as part of the festivities to celebrate the 25th anniversary of Blériot's historic cross-channel flight. It was also almost exactly 20 years since Gran's 500 km record-breaking flight to Norway. The party earlier visited Villacoublay, and also laid a floral wreath at the Tomb of the Unknown Soldier. (Note: "Le capitaine Gran, pionnier de l'air méconnu". Le Figaro (in French). 26 July 1934. p. 4d. Another article on the same page reports an award to five pilots who had collectively flown over 1,000,000 kilometres for Air France.)

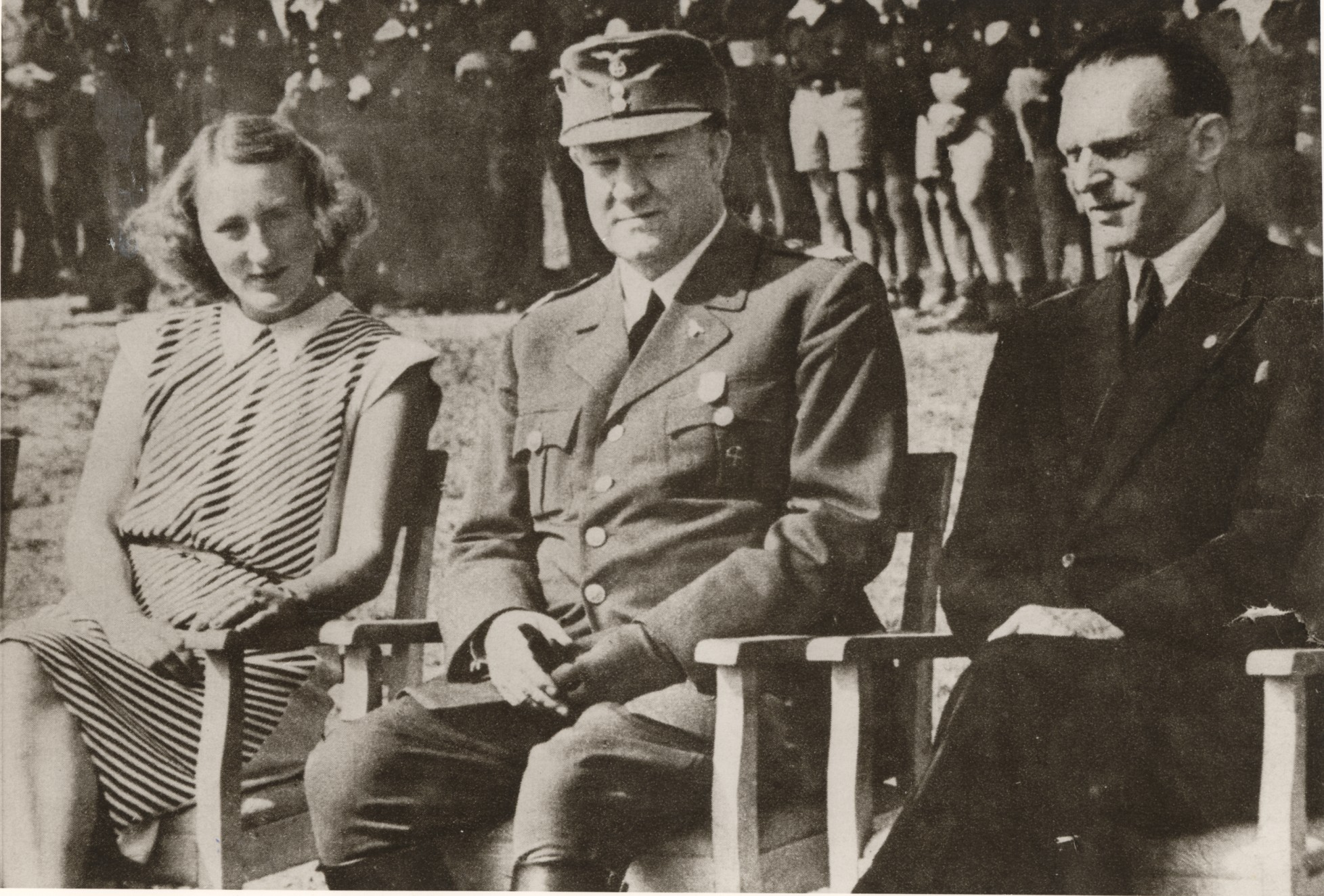
Gran (r.) with Vidkun Quisling at the annual Stiklestad rally, July 1944

During the Second World War, Gran was reportedly a member of Nasjonal Samling (NS), Vidkun Quisling's collaborationist party. The NS used Gran's hero-like status in their war propaganda, and in 1944, a commemorative stamp was issued to mark the 30th anniversary of Gran's flight across the North Sea.

He stood trial in 1948 for his war-time activities. One of the witnesses was Oberst Gudbrand Østbye, brigade commander for the Norwegian forces in Valdres in 1940. He said that Gran had spent some time in a military jail (Kakebu) suspected of being a spy; but on his release he had acted almost like the head of the prison camps and had ordered 300 soldiers to clear snow for farmers in Hemsedal. (Note: Albretsen 2000, citing Haga, Arnfinn (1999). Valdres 1940. Oslo: J. W. Cappelen.) Gran was found guilty of treason and sentenced to a prison term of 18 months: but since he had already been incarcerated during his arrest he didn't serve any further time in jail.

It has been speculated Gran feared reprisals from the pro-German fascist party because of his commitment to the Royal Air Force in the First World War. Others have speculated that his friendship with Göring and bitterness over not being offered a full-time job in the Norwegian Army Air Service may have been reasons for Gran to support the NS during the Nazi occupation of Norway.

The remainder of his life was devoted principally to writing books.

== Personal life ==
Memorial to Tryggve Gran in Cruden Bay, Aberdeenshire, Scotland

Gran was married three times. Firstly, as "Teddy Grant, formerly Tryggve Gran" on 29 April 1918, in London, to actress Lily St. John (Lilian Clara Johnson) who later starred in The Naughty Princess, marriage dissolved 1921; secondly in 1923 to Ingeborg Meinich (1902–1997) with whom he had two daughters, the marriage dissolved; lastly in 1941 to Margaret Schønheyder, a renowned portrait painter. With his last wife, he had a son, Hermann who was born in 1944.

Gran was also a gifted football player, earning one cap for Norway in 1908. This was Norway's first ever international match, and was played against Sweden in Gothenburg. Gran played as a striker. Sweden beat Norway 11–3.

Tryggve Gran died in his home in Grimstad Municipality, Norway on 8 January 1980 aged 91. A memorial was unveiled in Cruden Bay during 1971. Gran, together with his third wife Margaret, are buried in the churchyard at Fjære Church in Grimstad Municipality.

== Legacy ==
- Mount Gran and Gran Glacier in Antarctica are named after him, as is Tryggve Granfjellet in Spitsbergen.
- Gran was portrayed by Norwegian actor Sven Nordin in the 1985 Central Television serial The Last Place on Earth.

== Honours ==
- Silver Polar Medal (for his part in Robert F. Scott's Antarctic expedition 1910–1911)
- Order of St. Olav (Norway, 1915, First World War: returned in 1925)
- Military Cross (United Kingdom, 1918, First World War)
- Légion d'honneur (France, 1934)
- Order of the Crown of Italy

The Canterbury Museum, Christchurch, New Zealand, acquired Gran's four extant medals at a London auction in 2017 for £105,000. "The purchase included two of Mr Gran's journals as well as his Polar Medal as a member of the Antarctic expedition, United Kingdom Military Cross, French Legion of Honour and Italian Order of the Crown."

== Publications ==
- Hvor sydlyset flammer (1915)
- Under Britisk Flag: Krigen 1914–1918 (1919)
- Triumviratet (1921)
- En helt: Kaptein Scotts siste færd (1924)
- Mellom himmel og jord (1927)
- Heia – La Villa (1932)
- Stormen på Mont Blanc (1933)
- La Villa i kamp (1934)
- Slik var det: Fra kryp til flyger (1945)
- Slik var det: Gjennom livets passat (1952)
- Kampen om Sydpolen (1961)
- Første fly over Nordsjøen: Et femtiårsminne (1964)
- Fra tjuagutt til sydpolfarer (1974)
- Mitt liv mellom himmel og jord (1979)

== See also ==
- Aviation in Norway
