= Ragna Hørbye =

Norwegian politician (1861–1950)

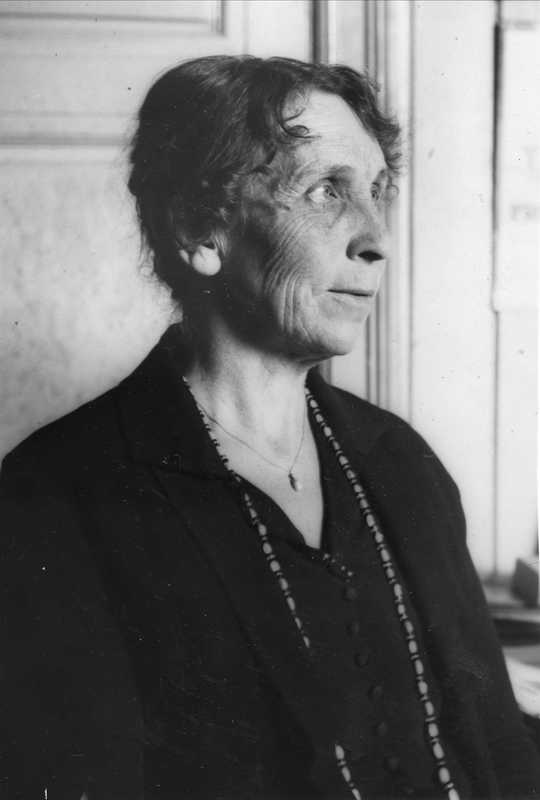
Ragna Hørbye

Ragna Hørbye, née Heyerdahl (15 September 1861 – 8 December 1950) was a Norwegian politician for the Liberal Left Party.

She was born in Furnes as a daughter of Harald Heyerdahl (1824–1886) and Marie Lithander. She took education, and studied languages abroad. In 1889 she married ophthalmologist Ludvig Hørbye (1856–1925). Her daughter Ragna Heyerdahl Hørbye married Colonel Gudbrand Østbye.

She was a member of Oslo city council for three terms, from 1920 to 1928. She was a central board member of the Liberal Left Party from 1918 to 1929. She was a deputy representative to the Parliament of Norway from 1925 to 1930. In 1924 she was elected as the third deputy on the Liberal Left/Conservative joint ballot, and fourth deputy in 1927. In 1930 her party did not field a joint ballot, but its own ballot, and Hørbye was the second candidate behind Anton Wilhelm Brøgger. Neither were elected.

She also issued two short story collections, Novelletter (1885) and Nye novelletter (1894). She died in December 1950 and was buried in Vår Frelsers gravlund.
