= Gerrit Johannes Geysendorffer =

Dutch aviation pioneer

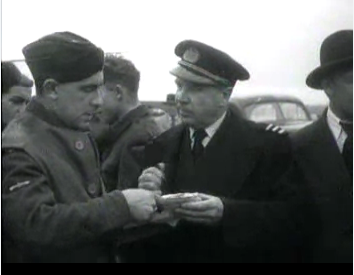
- Born: April 1, 1892; Sliedrecht, the Netherlands
- Died: January 26, 1947 (aged 54); Kastrup, Denmark
- Occupations: Military pilot, airline transport pilot for KLM

Gerrit Johannes "Geys" Geysendorffer (Note: several spelling variations of his surname have been used, including Geysendorfer, Geyssendorffer, and Geyssendorfer; in some sources also referred to as Jan Johannes Geysendorffer or Gerrit Jan Geysendorffer, with Jan being a common Dutch nickname for Johannes) (1 April 1892, Sliedrecht – 26 January 1947, Copenhagen Airport, Kastrup) was a Dutch aviation pioneer, knight in the Order of Orange-Nassau, and recipient of the 1926 Harmon National Trophy for the Netherlands.

Originally a military pilot, he was the first Dutch aviator to become a licensed airline transport pilot and one of the first two Dutch pilots employed by KLM Royal Dutch Airlines. He was the captain of the first intercontinental charter flight in 1927, a participant in the 1934 MacRobertson Air Race, and the captain of the fatal 1947 KLM PH-TCR flight. At the time of his death, Geysendorffer was the oldest pilot in KLM's employ and had accumulated over 25000 flight hours.

== Personal life ==
Geysendorffer was born on 1 April 1892 in Sliedrecht. He married Tofa Spandet on 14 December 1926, with whom he had two children. He died on 26 January 1947 when the plane he was piloting crashed shortly after takeoff from Copenhagen Airport, Kastrup.

== Career ==
=== Military service ===
Geysendorffer joined the Luchtvaartafdeling (LVA, the predecessor of the Royal Netherlands Air Force) at Soesterberg Air Base in 1918 or 1919, and on 4 September 1919 received his F.A.I. license. During his time at Soesterberg, he took part in a number of meteorological research flights, and accumulated 580 flight hours with the LVA by 1921.

=== N.G.G. Combinatie ===
On 1 April 1920, Sergeant Geysendorffer and two of his fellow NCOs, Evert Jacob Need and Piet van de Griend, started a small air tourism business called N.G.G. Combinatie, to hold demonstration flights when the men were on leave. The business used a single plane, a DFW C.V which had been bought by Geysendorffer and company and subsequently gifted to the LVA on the condition that Need, Geysendorffer and Van de Griend would be permitted to fly it when on leave. In June 1920, during the yearly traveling carnival (Dutch: kermis) in Venlo, N.G.G. Combinatie held a series of demonstration flights over the city over the course of several days, including multiple flights on 19 and 21 June. Whether any flights occurred on 22 June prior to a fatal flight that day is unknown. The fatal flight, a low flight over the city to drop advertising flyers for a local cinema, was piloted by Need while Geysendorffer and Van de Griend were in nearby Helden in order to plan future demonstration flights there. The plane took off around 3 p.m. local time from the Groote Heide (Note: a heath near Venlo that is now part of the Maas-Schwalm-Nette Nature Park) with Need and two passengers on board: the son of the cinema's owner, and the wife of the cinema's silent film narrator.

The plane caught on fire and hit a building on the Lomstraat in Venlo, but reports conflict on the order in which this happened. The Delftsche Courant wrote on 23 June 1920 that the plane, while flying over Venlo, caught on fire as a result of a burst fuel tank and subsequently came down, while the Zutphensche Courant wrote that the plane made an abnormal swerve, came down, then caught fire as a result of a burst fuel tank right before impact. In their 2013 article on N.G.G. Combinatie, Gerdessen and Hazewinkel describe the plane as having caught on fire while in flight and crashing as a result, but also cite an accident report by the Rijks Studiedienst voor Luchtvaart (RSL, predecessor of the Royal NLR) that describes the plane as having caught on fire after the impact. What all reports agree on is that all three people on board died. It resulted in the end of N.G.G. Combinatie, and was the first civil air disaster in the Netherlands.

=== KLM Royal Dutch Airlines ===
KLM Royal Dutch Airlines was founded on 7 October 1919, and its first scheduled commercial flight, between Croydon Airport and Amsterdam, took place on 17 May 1920. (Note: This flight, with the Airco DH.16 registered as G-EALU and leased from the British Aircraft Transport and Travel Limited, was flown by British pilot Henry "Jerry" Shaw.) On 1 March 1921, Geysendorffer and Rinse Hofstra were hired as the first Dutch pilots of KLM. On 14 April 1921, Geysendorffer was a passenger on the first KLM airmail flight between the Netherlands and Hamburg, Germany, in preparation of future flights along the route. The next day, Geysendorffer became the first Dutch pilot to receive an airline transport license.

A Fokker F.III captained by Geysendorffer, registration H-NABV, was hit by a gust of wind during landing, and ended up flipped on its back in January 1923, an incident that led to a construction change of the landing gear of both the H-NABV and the H-NABU, another Fokker F.III flown by KLM at the time.

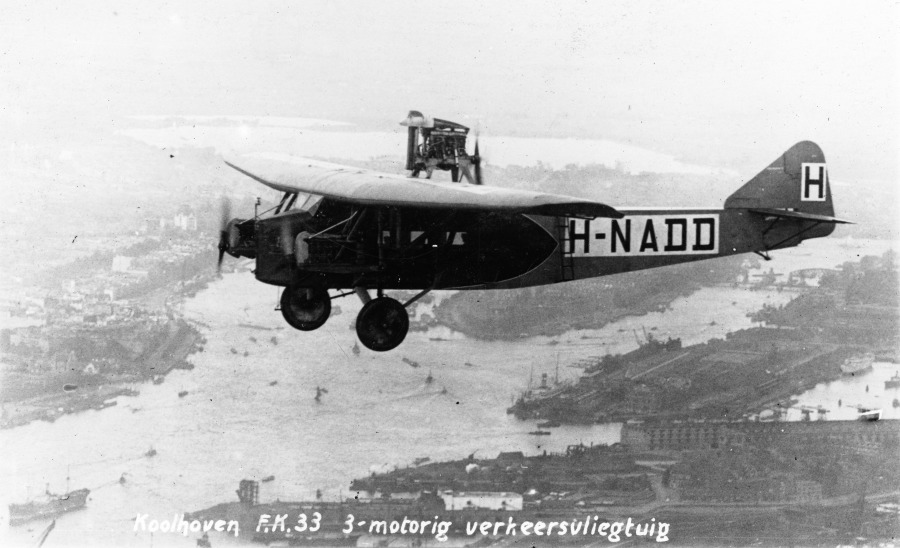
"Dikke Dirk", the NVI F.K.33 H-NADD

The KLM purchased its first trimotor airplane in 1925, the sole NVI F.K.33 to ever be built, which would in KLM's service be registered as H-NADD and nicknamed "Dikke Dirk" (English: Fat Dirk). On 22 September 1925, a press conference was held including NVI director Wallaardt Sacré, KLM's Albert Plesman and the plane's designer Frits Koolhoven. During a demonstration flight with several members of press on board, one of the plane's wheels came loose and hung suspended from the plane. Pilots Geysendorffer and Fons Aler landed the plane safely and without injuries.

On 22 January of the following year, Geysendorffer managed to reach Urk by plane to deliver post and yeast after the island had become isolated as a result of the freezing of the Zuiderzee, after a failed attempt two days prior. During the same year, he also captained the first KLM scheduled flight to Paris, led a group of five Fokker F.IIIs sold by KLM to Balair in a flight to Switzerland, and held, alongside Ivan Smirnov, a series of demonstration flights on 16 and 17 April in Hamburg, Copenhagen and Malmö with KLM's newly purchased Fokker F.VII planes as part of KLM's promotion of its upcoming scheduled flight service route, Rotterdam-Amsterdam-Hamburg-Kopenhagen-Malmö.

Geysendorffer was announced as recipient of the 1926 Harmon National Trophy for most outstanding aviator of the Netherlands in early 1927, and the award ceremony took place in May. Dutch newspaper Het Vaderland described Geysendorffer as "the symbol of a true airline pilot" (Dutch: het symbool ... van een waren lijnpiloot).

=== Charter flights with Van Lear Black ===
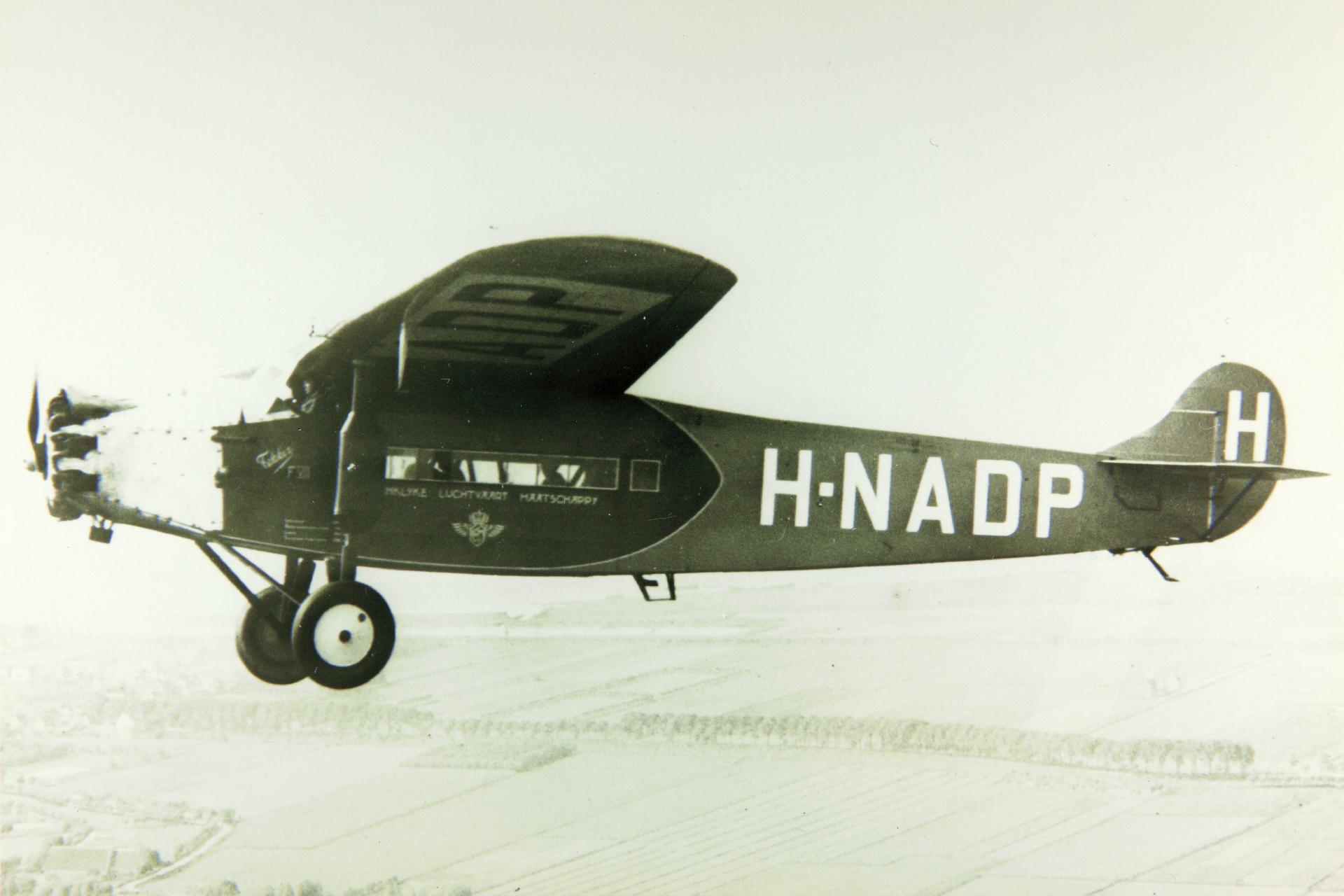
The Fokker F.VIIa H-NADP in flight

In early 1927, William Van Lear Black approached KLM to charter a plane and crew. KLM agreed, and provided him with a Fokker F.VIIa and a crew consisting of captain Geysendorffer, co-pilot J.B. Scholte and flight engineer K.A.O. Weber. From 1 March 1927 onwards, a series of flights between various European cities occurred. By 20 April, around 13,000 km had been flown, and by 13 June this had increased to 22,000 km.

In May 1927, Van Lear Black made plans to charter a plane for a flight from Amsterdam to Batavia (Note: modern-day Jakarta, Indonesia) and back. The crew would again consist of Geysendorffer, Scholte and Weber, flying the single-motor Fokker F.VIIa registered as H-NADP. The H-NADP departed from Schiphol Airport on 15 June and arrived in Batavia on 30 June. The return flight left the Dutch East Indies on 6 July and arrived in the Netherlands on 23 July.

It was the second ever flight between the Netherlands and the Dutch East Indies, and the flight would score a number of firsts: first intercontinental charter flight; first passenger flight between the Netherlands and the Dutch East Indies; first two-way flight between the two; (Note: the sole preceding flight, the 1924 H-NACC Amsterdam-Batavia testflight, had made its return to the Netherlands by ship) and, as a result of a landing at the Balestier plain on 29 June, first paying aerial passenger to Singapore.

Van Lear Black's trip to Batavia and back was well-publicized, and thousands of people came to Schiphol to witness the H-NADP's return to Amsterdam. At the official reception held upon the plane's arrival, Van Lear Black and the three crew members all were knighted in the Order of Orange-Nassau and received Silver Medals of the City of Amsterdam.

In early 1929, Geysendorffer left KLM for the private employ of Van Lear Black. After Van Lear Black's death in 1930, Geysendorffer rejoined KLM in 1931.

=== MacRobertson Air Race ===
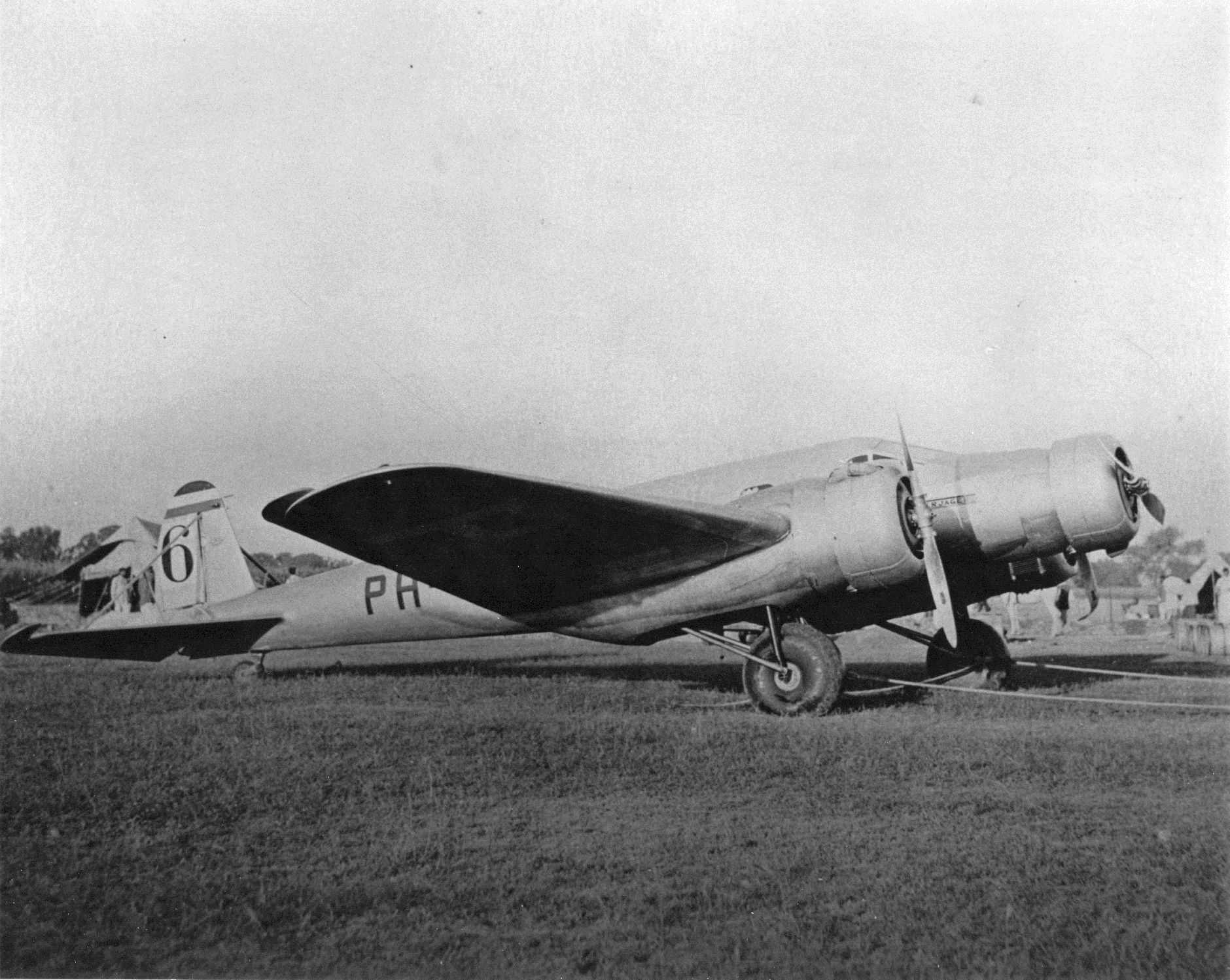
The Pander S-4 after landing at Allahabad

Together with co-pilot Dirk Lucas Asjes and radio operator Pieter Pronk, Geysendorffer took part in the 1934 MacRobertson Air Race, flying the Pander S-4 with registration PH-OST, formerly known as Postjager but renamed Panderjager for the occasion. It was the sole trimotor to take part in the race. At Allahabad, the plane experienced problems with its retractable landing gear. As a result, the plane took significant damage during landing, including to the propellers of two of its three motors. The damage ended any chance of victory in the air race.

Nevertheless, on 26 October, Geysendorffer sent a telegram that the crew had managed to repair the plane and held a successful 30-minute test flight; and that they would, with landing gear down, continue their voyage that evening as they "want[ed] to reach [their] goal in spite of severe setbacks" (Dutch: willen doel bereiken ondanks grooten tegenslag). At 10:40pm local time, as a result of a misunderstanding, a motorized vehicle crossed the runway to move a beacon during the Panderjager's takeoff. The Panderjager collided with the vehicle and caught fire, rapidly burning down. While the Panderjager's crew managed to escape the plane and sustained only minor injuries, the vehicle's driver was severely injured.

=== 1947 DC-3 Copenhagen disaster ===
In 1947, Geysendorffer was the captain of the KLM Douglas DC-3 that crashed shortly after takeoff from Copenhagen Airport. All crew and passengers on board died, including Swedish Prince Gustaf Adolf and U.S. opera singer Grace Moore. The crash was caused by loss of control on takeoff as a result of the tail fin's elevator gust lock pins not having been removed prior to the flight. It was, at the time of the crash, the worst aviation disaster in Danish history. At the time of his death, Geysendorffer was the oldest pilot in KLM's employ and had accumulated over 25000 flight hours.
