= Michèle Boni Yapi =

Ivorian aircraft maintenance technician and metrologist (1965–2025)

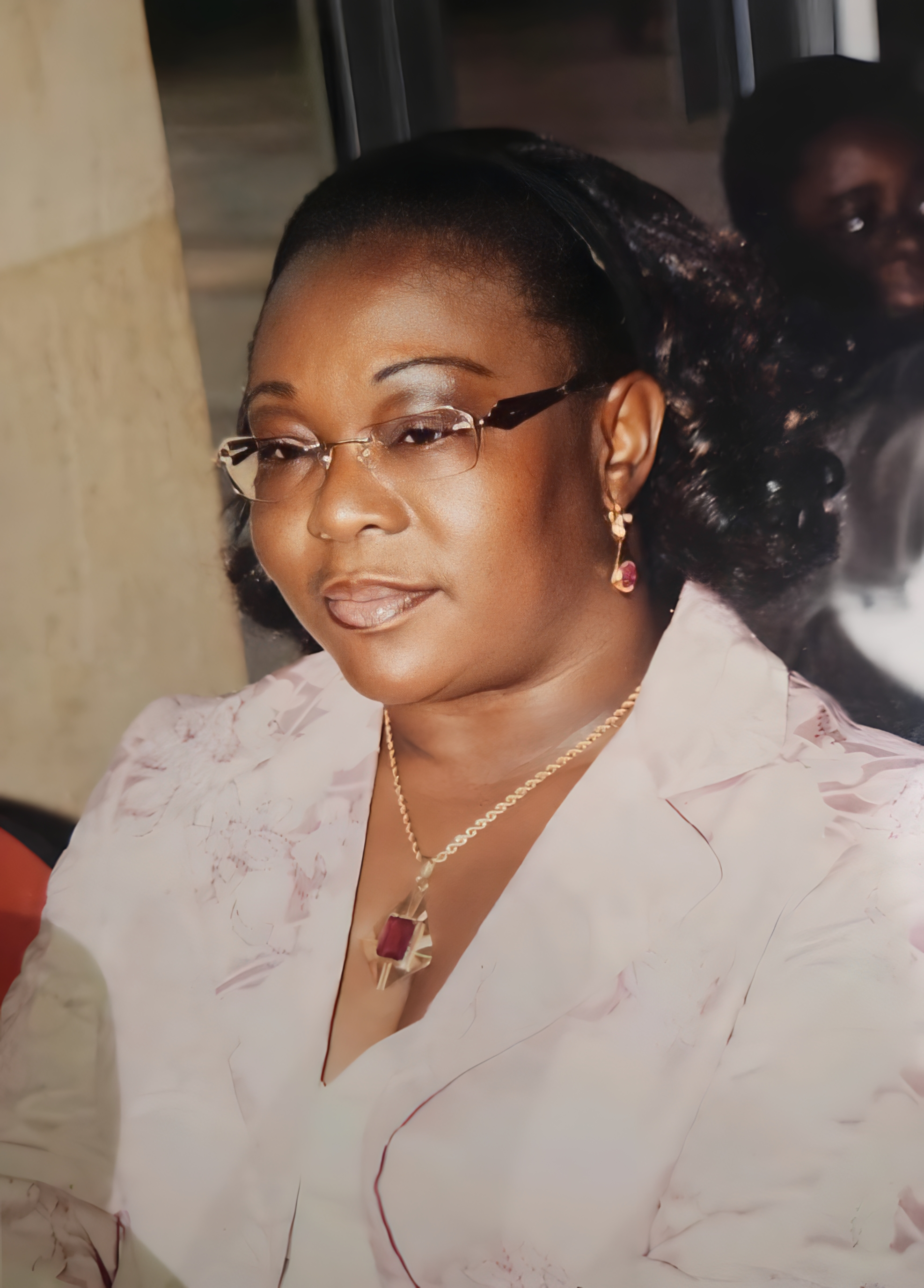
- Michele Boni Yapi
- Born: July 4, 1965; Katiola, Côte d'Ivoire
- Died: February 24, 2025 (aged 59); Abidjan, Côte d'Ivoire
- Education: Lycée Sainte-Marie d'Abidjan; University of Abidjan; Air Afrique Training Center (Dakar); INSET Yamoussoukro
- Occupations: Aircraft Maintenance Technician, Metrologist
- Known for: Ivorian Pioneer in West African aviation maintenance

Michèle Boni Yapi (4 July 1965 – 24 February 2025) was an Ivorian aircraft maintenance technician and metrologist. She is recognized as the first woman in Côte d'Ivoire and West Africa to qualify and work professionally as an aircraft electronics technician.

== Early life and education ==
Michèle Boni was born on 4 July 1965 in Katiola, Côte d'Ivoire. She attended the Lycée Sainte-Marie d'Abidjan, where she obtained her scientific baccalaureate (Série C) in 1983. After studying at the Faculty of Sciences at the University of Abidjan, she passed the entrance exam in 1985 to join the professional training center of the multinational airline Air Afrique in Dakar, Senegal.

In 1987, at the age of 22, she graduated as an Aircraft Maintenance Technician, specializing in Aircraft Electronics (FEA3 promotion), becoming the first woman in the country to hold this technical qualification. She later expanded her technical background by training as an application analyst-programmer at the INSET in Abidjan from 1988 to 1990.

== Career ==
Michèle Boni Yapi began her professional career at Air Afrique, working from 1987 to 1991 as an instrument technician at the Centre de Révision Accessoires (CERA), where she maintained and inspected aircraft instruments. Over a twelve-year period with the airline, she transitioned into administrative and management roles, serving as an administrative supervisor in the Maintenance Department (1991–1994) and subsequently as head of the asset management department (1994–1999). She also worked within the Flight Studies and Assistance Department.

In January 2013, she joined the Laboratoire National d'Essais de Qualité de Métrologie et d'Analyses (LANEMA), a national metrology and quality control laboratory in Côte d'Ivoire. During her tenure, she held several positions including administrative manager, head of the metrology and instruments laboratory, and acting technical manager, overseeing technical compliance and civil aviation renewals (ANAC) until her passing.

== Death and legacy ==
Michèle Boni Yapi died on 24 February 2025 in Abidjan. Following her passing, she received posthumous international recognition for her pioneering role in West African aviation, notably during a special edition of the Jazz Afrika cultural event held in Dakar, Senegal, where local authorities and institutions honored her memory.
