= Gudbrand Østbye =

- Born: 2 October 1885; Gjøvik, Norway
- Died: 2 June 1972 (aged 86)
- Occupations: Army officer and historian
- Relatives: Ragna Hørbye (mother-in-law)
- Awards: St. Olav's Medal With Oak Branch; Order of the Sword

Gudbrand Østbye (2 October 1885 – 2 June 1972) was a Norwegian army officer and historian. He was born in Gjøvik, a son of factory owner Anders Østbye and Ellen Anna Hovdenak. He was married to Ragna Heyerdahl Hørbye, and thus son-in-law of Ragna Hørbye. During the Norwegian Campaign in 1940, he was in command of the 4th Brigade. Among his publications are Krigen i Valdres from 1946, and two volumes of the series Krigen i Norge 1940. He was decorated with the St. Olav's Medal With Oak Branch, and was a Knight of the Order of the Sword.
