= Herbert G. Brackley =

English aviators

Herbert G Brackley was a pioneer of civil aviation during the first half of the twentieth century.

== Early life ==
Brackley was born on 4 October 1894. During his early life, Brackley moved around many times, living for part of his life at 20 Umfreville Road, Harringay in London.

== Career ==
Joining Reuters in 1912, by 1914 he was working in their Paris office. He gained a Royal Aero Club Certificate in 1915. He was commissioned into the Royal Naval Air Service as a Flight Sub-Lieutenant on 13 June 1915. On the merging of that service with the RFC to form the RAF he was a Flight Commander transferring as a Captain in the RAF. By the end of World War I he had been promoted to Major.

Intending to set up an air service for Reuters after the war, these plans fell through and instead he went to Newfoundland with a Handley Page V/1500 in order to attempt the trans-Atlantic crossing. Beaten in the attempt by Alcock and Brown, he flew the other way and completed the first flight from Newfoundland to New York City, accompanied by Admiral Mark Kerr. He also completed a number of other record breaking flights in America. Returning to Britain, he joined Handley Page as the Chief of the Air Department of Handley Page Transport.

In 1920 he led a crew of four attempting to be the first to fly from London to Cape Town. Flying a Handley Page O/400 they left Cricklewood Airfield, London on 25 January, flying the first leg to Paris. On trying to take off from Brindisi, Italy one of the four (a mechanic called Stoten) was killed when he and the other mechanic tried to free a wheel that had become bogged down, being hit by one of the propellers which were still moving. A new propeller was required and the plane did not take off again until 19 February. Brackley had to make an emergency landing at El Shereik in Sudan. He made the landing without rudders and with ineffective elevators and on landing the nose was buried in the desert sand. He, the co-pilot and the remaining mechanic were safe and the flight was abandoned.

In 1921 he joined the British Air Mission as an Air Adviser to the Imperial Japanese Naval Air Service and spent the next three years helping in the organisation and training of the Japanese Naval Air Arm. Returning to Britain in 1924, he joined the newly formed Imperial Airways as their Air Superintendent as well as remaining a member of the Reserve of Air Force Officers. His task with Imperial Airways was to plan operations and organise training as well as carry out route development. He even undertook some of the developmental flying himself such as the first scheduled flight in the new Armstrong Whitworth Argosy from London to Paris which he carried out on 5 August 1926. He also personally surveyed the route to be taken by the new four-engined flying boats between England and Australia, recommending that large distances could be flown overland.

Recalled to service in 1939, he was initially assigned to RAF Coastal Command (as a Squadron Leader) where his experience with flying boats and trans-Atlantic flights proved useful. However, by the middle of the war the vast operating areas, the speed of modern warfare and the development of airborne forces, not to mention the ferrying of aircraft to and from operational zones, had brought with them the requirement for dedicated transport units. In 1943 these dedicated units were brought together under the umbrella of the newly created RAF Transport Command. With his pre-war experience of running an Empire-wide airline service, it was appropriate to appoint him to the post of SASO in the new command with the rank of Group Captain.

With the end of the war, he relinquished his commission as Air Commodore and returned to the civilian airline world, initially as the Assistant to the chairman of BOAC. Amongst his post-war achievements was the successful evacuation of 35,000 people from India to Pakistan following the partition of India. On 1 April 1948 he was appointed Chief Executive of British South American Airways Corporation. On a stopover in Rio de Janeiro during a tour of South America he drowned in a swimming accident on 15 November 1948.

== Personal life ==
Brackley married Frida Mond, daughter of the chemist and industrialist Sir Robert Mond in London on 27 September 1922. They met while he was in Japan which she visited on a round-the-world cruise. They lived in Japan for a time. They had two sons. Brackley's body was brought to England from Brazil and he was buried in Blakeney churchyard in Norfolk, very close to his home. Frida prepared a book based on his correspondence which was published in 1952.
