= Curtiss L =

Curtiss engine

Model "L"
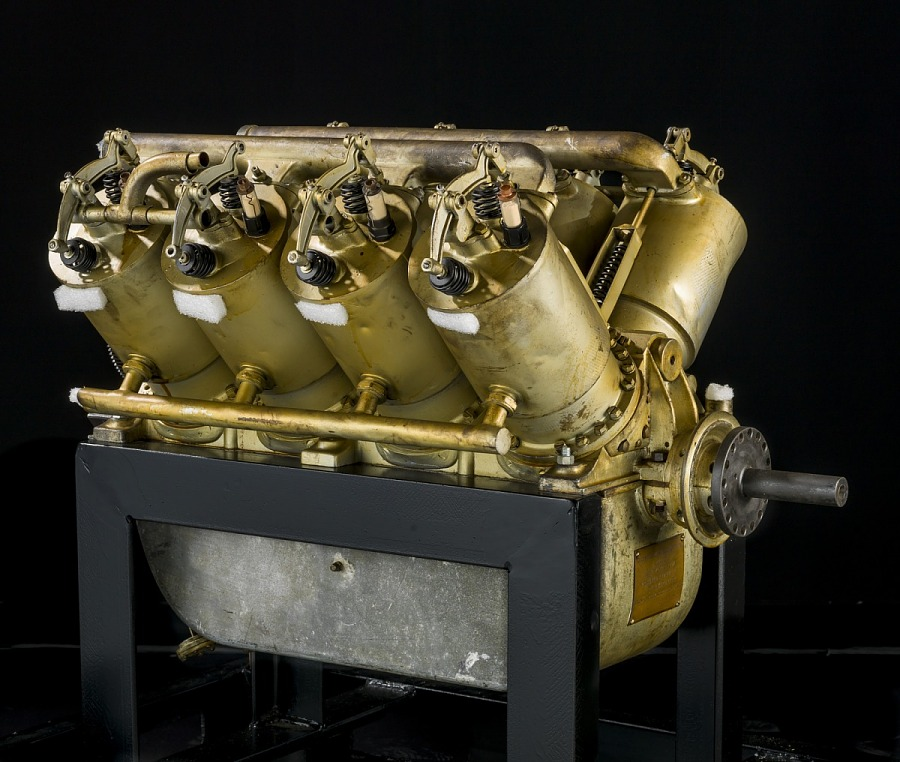
- Curtiss Model "L" aircraft engine
- Type: V-8 piston engine
- National origin: United States
- Manufacturer: Curtiss Aeroplane and Motor Company
- First run: 1910
- Major applications: Curtiss Model D Curtiss Model E
- Developed into: Curtiss O

The Curtiss L is the first in a series of 503 cu in (8.2 L) water-cooled V8 engines, produced by the Curtiss Aeroplane and Motor Company. (Note: Early Curtiss aero engines were referred to by their nominal horsepower. The "L" designation does not appear in contemporary publications but is used by later authors when classifying the engine.)

Early Curtiss engines were air-cooled, but in pursuit of greater power, Curtiss began developing liquid-cooled designs. Historical records indicate a Model L engine was fitted to a Curtiss built monoplane which was displayed, but not flown, at the 1910 Gordon Bennett race at Belmont Park, New York. It is also likely that a Model L engine powered the aircraft that crashed in Macon, Georgia, in 1912, resulting in the death of the aviator Eugene Burton Ely.

Continued development of Curtiss's 503 cu in (8.2 L) V8 series eventual lead to the commercially successful Curtiss OX-5 engines which were built in large numbers during World War I.

== Applications ==
- Curtiss Model D
- Curtiss Model E

== Specifications ==
Data from the Smithsonian

=== General characteristics ===
- Type: 8-cylinder water-cooled Vee piston engine
- Bore: 4 in (102 mm)
- Stroke: 5 in (127 mm)
- Displacement: 503 cu in (8.2 L)
- Length: 43 in (1,092 mm)
- Width: 31.75 in (806 mm)
- Height: 35.5 in (902 mm)
- Dry weight: 285 lb (129 kg)

=== Components ===
- Valvetrain: One intake and one exhaust valve per cylinder, pushrod-actuated
- Cooling system: Water-cooled

=== Performance ===
- Power output: 65 hp (48 kW) at 1,150 rpm

== See also ==
- List of aircraft engines
