= John Henry Towers =

United States Navy admiral and pioneer aviator

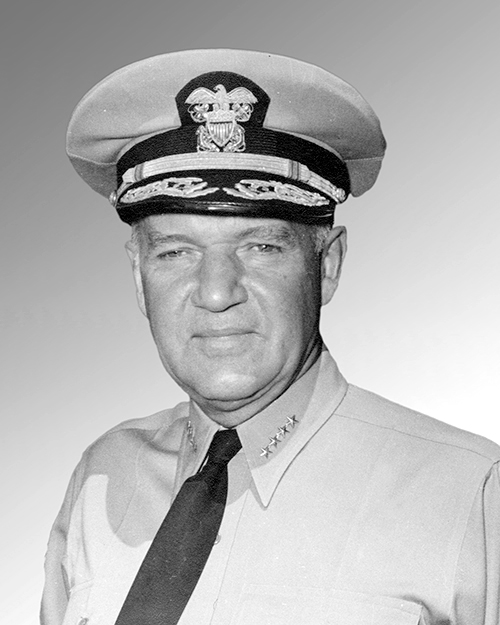
- Towers circa 1946
- Born: January 30, 1885; Rome, Georgia, U.S.
- Died: April 30, 1955 (aged 70); Jamaica, New York, U.S.
- Relatives: Herbert D. Riley (son-in-law)
- Military career
- Allegiance: United States
- Branch: United States Navy
- Service years: 1906–1947
- Rank: Admiral
- Service number: 0-5891
- Commands: United States Pacific Fleet; United States Fifth Fleet; Second Fast Carrier Task Force; Task Force 38; USS Langley (CV-1); USS Mugford (DD-105); USS Saratoga (CV-3)
- Conflicts: Occupation of Cuba; World War I World War II
- Awards: Navy Cross (2); Navy Distinguished Service Medal; Legion of Merit; NC-4 Medal
- Other work: President, Pacific War Memorial; President, Flight Safety Council

John Henry Towers CBE (January 30, 1885 – April 30, 1955) was a highly decorated United States Navy four-star admiral and pioneer naval aviator. He made important contributions to the technical and organizational development of naval aviation from its beginnings, eventually serving as Chief of the Bureau of Aeronautics (1939–1942). He commanded carrier task forces during World War II, and retired in December 1947. He and Marc Mitscher were the only early Naval Aviation pioneers to survive the hazards of early flight to remain with naval aviation throughout their careers. Towers spent his last years supporting aeronautical research and advising the aviation industry.

== Early life and career ==
John H. Towers was born on 30 January 1885 at Rome, Georgia, son of William Magee and Mary (Norton) Towers. He completed public school in Rome and entered the Georgia School of Technology at Atlanta, where he completed one year in civil engineering course, before receiving an appointment to the United States Naval Academy at Annapolis, Maryland in June 1902. While at the academy, Towers was nicknamed Hattie and reached the rank of cadet petty officer 1st class.

Among his classmates were many future admirals including Roland M. Brainard, Arthur L. Bristol, William L. Calhoun, Milo F. Draemel, Robert L. Ghormley, William A. Glassford, Charles C. Hartigan, Aubrey W. Fitch, Frank J. Fletcher, Isaac C. Kidd, John S. McCain Sr., Leigh Noyes, Ferdinand L. Reichmuth, Sherwoode A. Taffinder, Russell Willson, and Thomas Withers.

He graduated with a Bachelor of Science degree on 12 February 1906 and was attached as passed midshipman to the battleship USS Kentucky. Towers then took part in the cruise around the world with Great White Fleet and also served in the Cuban waters during the Second Occupation of Cuba. After the two years at sea, then required by law, he was commissioned ensign on 13 February 1908 while still aboard Kentucky.

Towers was transferred to New York Shipbuilding Corporation for duty in connection with fitting out of the first United States dreadnought battleship, USS Michigan, in September 1909 and upon her commissioning in January 1910, he served as fire control officer and spotter. During his tenure in this capacity, he became interested in aviation, which was motivated by recognition that higher elevation observation was required to observe fall of shot at the range of modern naval artillery. Towers requested aviation training in November 1910; but his proficiency at gunfire spotting was considered essential to Michigan's mission when Glenn Curtiss offered to train a naval officer to fly the following month, so Theodore G. Ellyson became the first United States naval aviator. Only after Curtiss moved his flying school from San Diego to the east coast was Tower released from Michigan to report to the Curtiss Flying School in Hammondsport, New York, on June 27, 1911, for aviation training.

=== Pioneer naval aviator ===
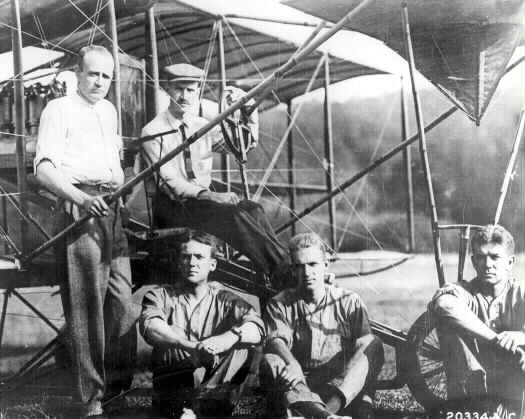
Early Naval Aviators: Towers is seated second from left. Glenn Curtiss at controls. Theodore Ellyson at the nose wheel of the plane.

Under the tutelage of aviation pioneers Curtiss and Ellyson, Towers qualified as a pilot with the Aero Club of America on 13 September 1911, flying the Navy's first airplane, a Curtiss A-1 seaplane. In Sept 1911 Towers and Ellyson created the first official Naval Air Station and flying aviation unit at Greenbury Point, Maryland across the Severn River from the Naval Academy under orders from Captain Washington Irving Chambers, the first Navy officer assigned to development of the nascent U.S. Naval aviation program.

In October 1911, Towers achieved a distance record, flying an A-1 from Annapolis, Maryland, to Old Point Comfort, Virginia, a distance of 112 miles in 122 minutes. He set several speed and altitude records at the time.

Due to the winter weather conditions at Greenbury Point they crated the airplanes and Towers et al. traveled to North Island in San Diego, California where, in conjunction with the Curtiss Flying School, he took part in developing and improving naval aircraft types

After that winter in San Diego they went back to Greenbury Point. On October 6, 1912, he achieved an American endurance record by rigging extra gasoline tanks to a Curtiss A-2 seaplane, allowing him to remain aloft for 6 hours, ten minutes, 35 seconds. From October to December 1912, Towers conducted tests to spot submerged submarines from the air over the Chesapeake Bay. This later was valuable in leading to the design of the NC boats and the First Crossing of the Atlantic in 1919. He furthered those tests into 1913 during fleet operations near Guantanamo Bay, Cuba. Additionally, he investigated the potential for Navy aerial reconnaissance, bombing, photography, and communications.

On 8 May 1913, Lt. Towers flew a long-distance flight of 169 miles in a Curtiss flying boat from the Washington Navy Yard down the Potomac River and then up the Chesapeake Bay to the U.S. Naval Academy at Annapolis, Maryland. The flight took three hours and five minutes. Ensign Godfrey Chevalier was his passenger.

On 20 June 1913, Towers was nearly killed in an aviation mishap over the Chesapeake Bay. While he was flying as a passenger in a Wright seaplane, his plane was caught in a sudden downdraft and plummeted earthward. The pilot, Ensign W.D. Billingsley, was thrown from the aircraft and killed (becoming the first naval aviation fatality). Towers was wrenched from his seat but managed to catch a wing strut and stay with the plane until it crashed into the Chesapeake. Interviewed by Glenn Curtiss soon thereafter, Towers recounted the circumstances of the tragedy; his report and resultant recommendations eventually led to the design and adoption of safety belts and harnesses for pilots and their passengers.

On 20 January 1914, after appealing to the higher-ups to move the aviation unit to warmer climes Lieutenant Towers led 9 officers and 23 enlisted men, with seven aircraft, portable hangars and other gear from the aviation unit at Annapolis (Greenbury Point) to Pensacola, Florida to set up the naval aviation training unit. On April 20, 1914, Towers led the first naval aviation unit called into action with the Fleet. He and two other pilots, 12 enlisted men and three aircraft sailed from Pensacola aboard the cruiser Birmingham in response to the Tampico Affair.

=== Naval aviator designation and insignia ===
In January 1915, the navy decided to officially designate its flyers. At that time, Towers was officially designated as Naval Aviator No. 3, with an effective date of 1914. Lieutenant Commander Towers, while assigned to the aviation desk under the CNO, is credited with the development of the Naval Aviators badge, which were designed and ordered in 1917. On January 19, 1918, distribution of the first gold Naval Aviator wings began, and it is likely that Towers, as Senior Naval Aviator in Washington at the time, was an early, if not the earliest, recipient.

== World War I ==
In August 1914, shortly after the war began, Towers was ordered to London as assistant naval attaché—a billet he filled until he returned to the United States in the autumn of 1916. That August Lieutenant Towers accompanied the U.S. Relief Expedition aboard the USS Tennessee as part of the naval delegation led by Commander Reginald R. Belknap, with overall command by Assistant Secretary of the Army Henry S. Breckinridge. Subsequently, Towers advocated for the First Yale Unit, which became the core of naval aviation's participation in the war.

In May 1917, Lieutenant Commander Towers was ordered to the Bureau of Navigation as Supervisor of the Naval Reserve Flying Corps, a precursor to the Naval Air Reserve Force. When the Navy established the Division of Aviation, at Navy Department headquarters, Towers was appointed Assistant Director of Naval Aviation. In that position, he orchestrated the buildup from a handful of obsolete aircraft and fewer than 50 pilots to a force of thousands of aircraft and aviators. Towers was subsequently awarded the Navy Cross for his wartime service as Assistant Director of Naval Aviation.

== Interwar years, 1919–1939 ==
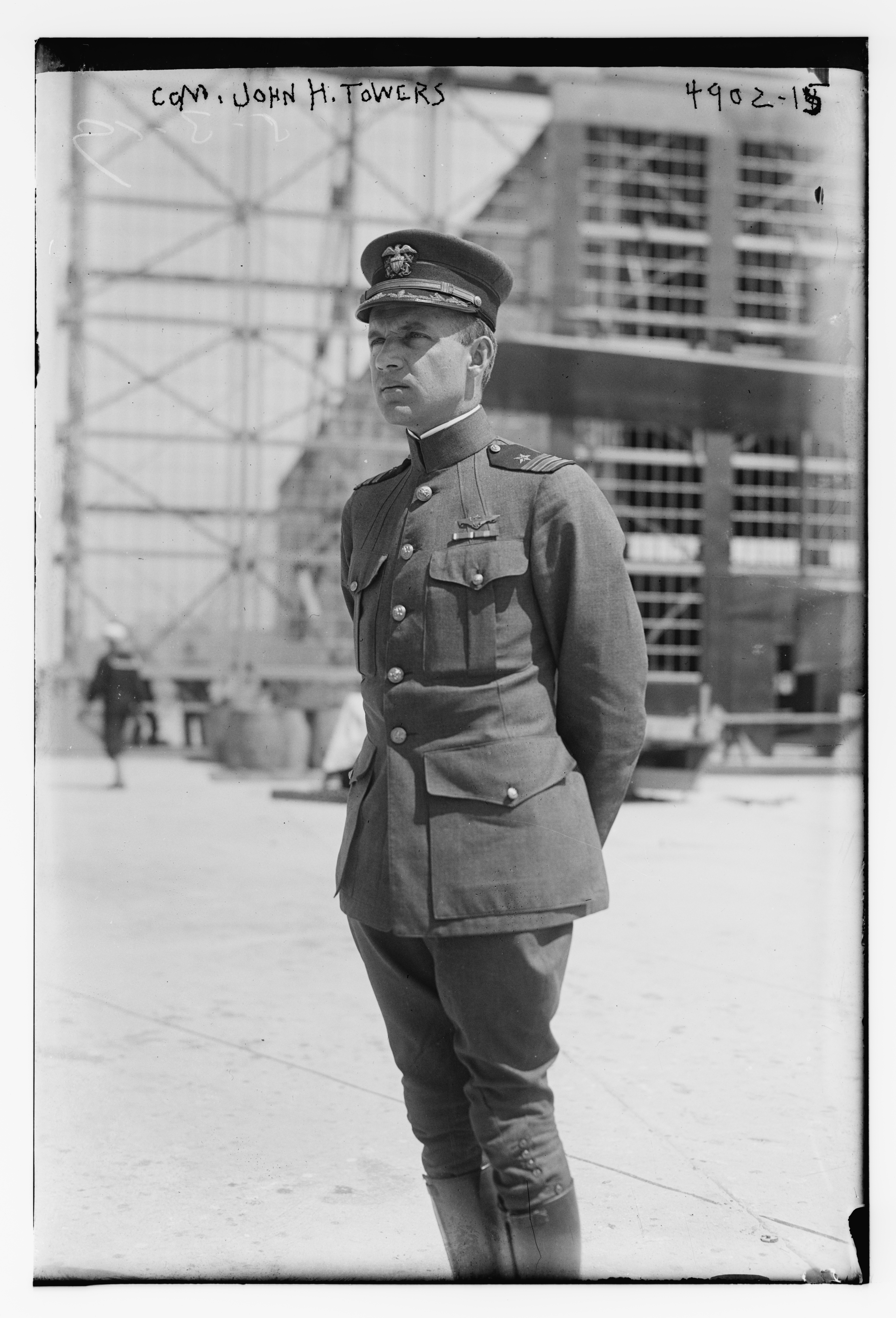
Towers as Commander in 1919

During the interwar years, Towers was a leading advocate of Naval Aviation (and especially carrier aviation). He was involved in a number of pioneering developments in Naval Aviation, including the first transatlantic crossing by aircraft; serving as commander of the first U.S. aircraft carrier, USS Langley; and holding important positions (including bureau chief) within the Bureau of Aeronautics (BuAer), the organizational structure established for naval aviation in 1921.

=== Transatlantic crossing: Flight of NC-4, 1919 ===
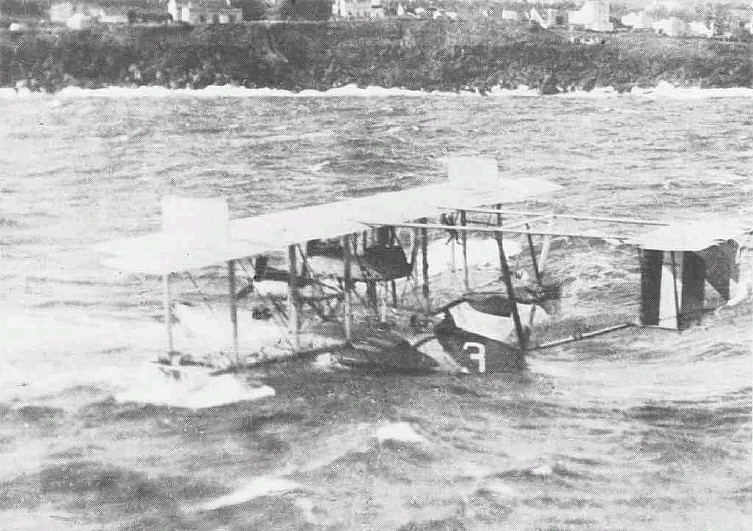
The NC-3, commanded by Towers, limps into the Azores after an attempt to cross the Atlantic

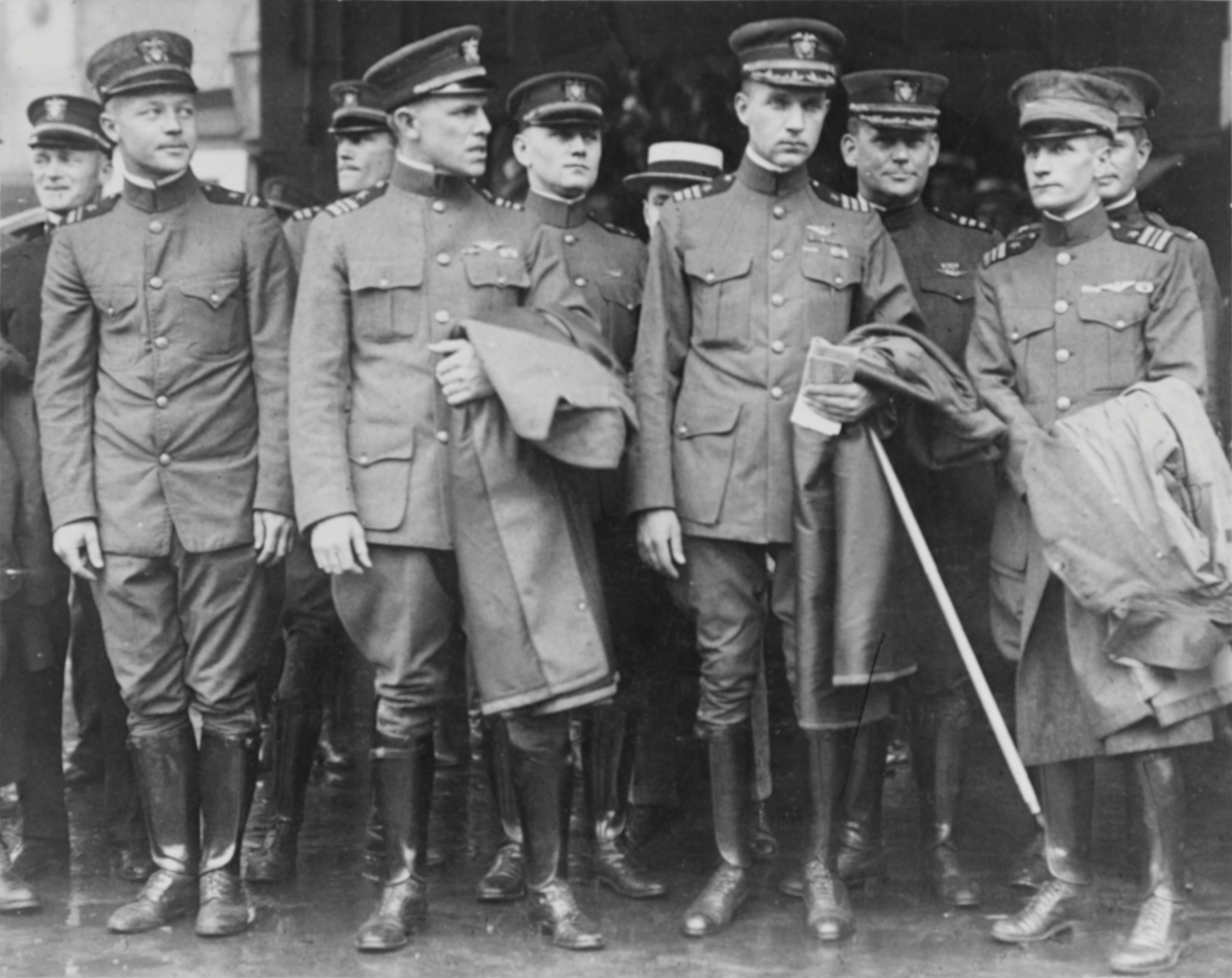
Officers of the Transatlantic Flight, Towers with walking cane, beside him are future admirals Patrick N. L. Bellinger and Albert C. Read.

In 1919, then-Commander Towers proposed, planned and led the first air crossing of the Atlantic. Planning for the mission began during the early years of World War I, when Allied shipping was threatened by submarine warfare, but could not be accomplished before the war's end. The flying expedition began on 8 May 1919 when three Curtiss NC Flying Boats, designated NC-1, NC-3 and NC-4, left Naval Air Station Rockaway, New York, The aircraft made stops in Chatham, Massachusetts, and Halifax, Nova Scotia, before reaching Trepassey, Newfoundland, on 15 May 1919.

On 16 May they left on the longest leg of their journey, to the Azores. Dense fog forced NC-1 and NC-3 to land in heavy seas, and neither could take off again. After NC-1 began taking on water, the crew was rescued by the Greek freighter Ionia. The crew of the NC-3, including Towers, managed to keep the NC-3 afloat for 52 hours, taxiing the craft more than 200 miles to Ponta Delgada on São Miguel Island. NC-4 went on to complete the transatlantic crossing, arriving at Lisbon on 27 May. For his leadership in the operation, Towers was awarded his second Navy Cross. He was also made a commander of the Order of the Tower and Sword by the Portuguese government on 3 June 1919. Ten years later, Towers and the flight crew of NC-4 were awarded Congressional Gold Medals.

=== Sea and shore assignments, 1920s and 1930s ===
The newly appointed Chief of Bureau of Aeronautics, U.S. Navy, Rear Admiral John H. Towers, right, being administered the oath on June 1, 1939

Between the autumn of 1919 and the late winter of 1922 and 1923, Towers served at sea, as the executive officer of USS Aroostook and as the commanding officer of USS Mugford, a destroyer that had been redesignated an aircraft tender. He then served as executive officer at NAS Pensacola. From March 1923 to September 1925, he served as an assistant naval attaché at the American embassies at London, Paris, Rome, The Hague, and Berlin.

Returning to the United States in autumn 1925, he was assigned to the Bureau of Aeronautics and served as a member of the court of inquiry that investigated the loss of dirigible USS Shenandoah.

Towers next commanded USS Langley, the Navy's first aircraft carrier, from January 1927 to August 1928. He received a commendation for "coolness and courage in the face of danger" when a gasoline line caught fire and burned on board the carrier in December 1927. Towers personally led the vigorous and successful effort to suppress the flames kindled by the explosion and thus averted a catastrophe.

After shore duty in the Bureau of Aeronautics, Towers successively served as head of the plans division and later, as assistant bureau chief. Towers joined the staff of the Commander, Aircraft, Battle Force, under Rear Admiral Harry E. Yarnell, in June 1931. He was among the staff which planned a successful "attack" on Pearl Harbor during the Joint Army-Navy Exercise No. 4 in the Hawaiian Islands in February 1932—an operation which was to be duplicated on a larger scale by the Japanese in December 1941.

Between June 1933 and June 1939, Towers filled a variety of billets ashore and afloat: he completed the senior course at the Naval War College in 1934; commanded the Naval Air Station at San Diego; again served on the staff of ComAirBatFor; commanded the aircraft carrier USS Saratoga; and became Assistant Chief of the Bureau of Aeronautics. On 1 June 1939, he was named chief of the Bureau of Aeronautics with the accompanying rank of rear admiral.

== World War II ==
As Aeronautics Bureau chief, Towers organized the Navy's aircraft procurement plans while war clouds gathered over the Far East and in the Atlantic. Under his leadership, the air arm of the Navy grew from 2,000 planes in 1939 to 39,000 in 1942. He also instituted a rigorous pilot-training program and established a trained group of reserve officers for ground support duties. During Towers' tenure, the number of men assigned to naval aviation activities reached a high point of some three quarters of a million.

=== World War II operational commands ===
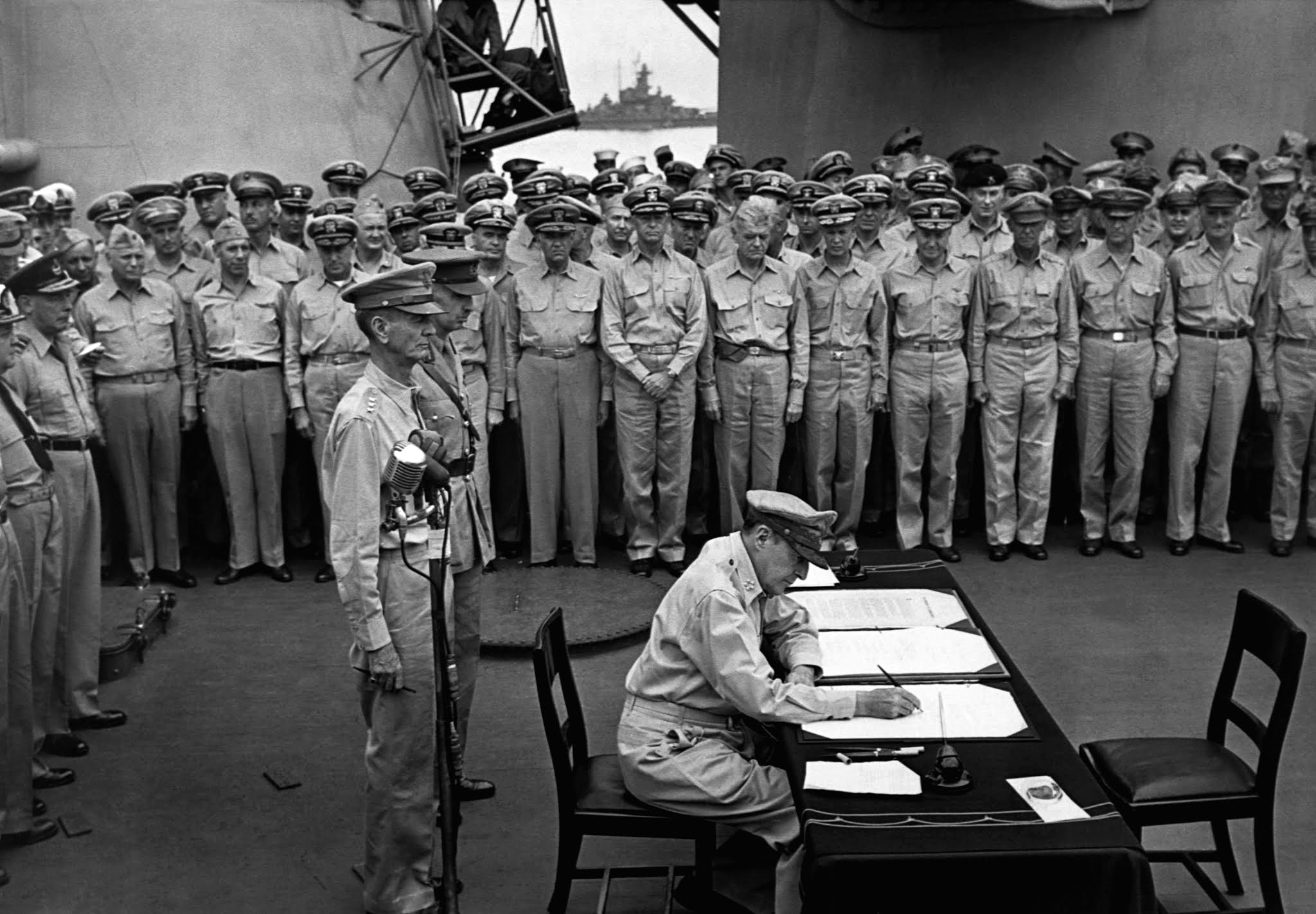
Allied sailors and officers watch General of the Army Douglas MacArthur sign documents during the surrender ceremony aboard Missouri on 2 September 1945. Towers is ninth from the right.

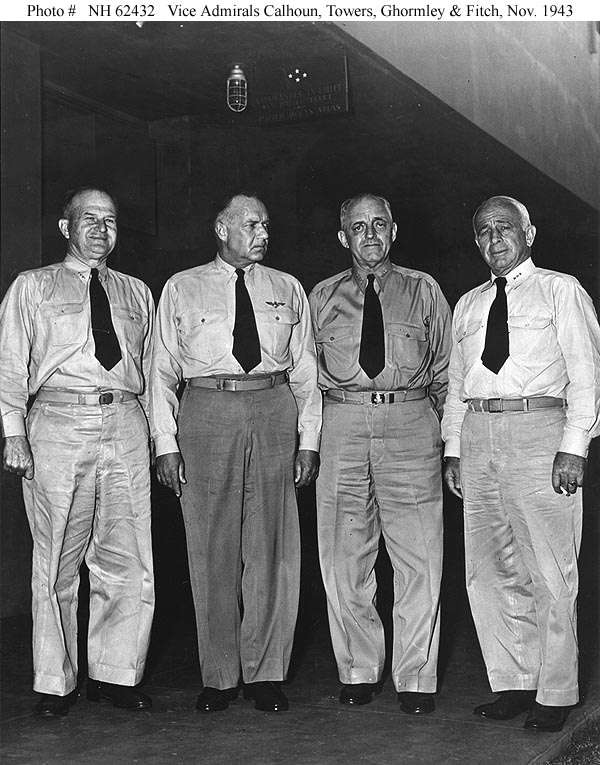
Naval Academy classmates, now admirals, in Pacific in November 1943: Calhoun, Towers, Ghormley and Fitch

Promoted to vice admiral on 6 October 1942, Towers became Commander, Air Force, Pacific Fleet. From this billet, he supervised the development, organization, training, and supply of the Fleet's growing aviation capability, and helped develop the strategy which spelled the doom of the Japanese fleet and eventual American victory in the Pacific. For his "sound judgment and keen resourcefulness", Towers received, successively, the Legion of Merit and the Distinguished Service Medal.

Towers was subsequently promoted to the dual position of Deputy Commander-in-Chief, Pacific Ocean Area (DCINCPOA) and Deputy Commander-in-Chief, Pacific Fleet (DCINCPAC). In this capacity, he served as Admiral Chester Nimitz's chief advisor on naval aviation policy, fleet logistics, and administration matters.

In August 1945, Towers was given command of the Second Fast Carrier Task Force and Task Force 38, Pacific Fleet. He held this position in the closing days of the war.

== Post-war service ==
On 7 November 1945, he broke his flag aboard the battleship USS New Jersey as commander, 5th Fleet. On 1 February 1946, he relieved Admiral Raymond Spruance as commander in chief, Pacific Fleet, with the aircraft carrier USS Bennington his flagship, and held the post until March 1947.

In 1946, President Truman signed the first Outline Command Plan (now known as the Unified Command Plan) that called for the establishment of several joint or unified commands. On 1 January 1947, the new United States Pacific Command stood up as one of the first unified commands with Admiral Towers as its first commander. He served as the commander of Pacific Command for only two months before being reassigned: 1 January 1947 – 28 February 1947. Admiral Towers was dual-hatted as both commander in chief, Pacific Fleet and commander in chief, Pacific Command.

After chairing the Navy's General Board from March to December 1947, Towers retired on 1 December 1947.

== Retirement ==
After retirement, Towers served as president of the Pacific War Memorial, as assistant to the president of Pan American World Airways, and as president of the Flight Safety Council. Towers died in St. Albans Naval Hospital, Jamaica, New York, on 30 April 1955 and was buried at Arlington National Cemetery.

== Honors and awards ==
In 1961, Towers was posthumously designated the second recipient of the Gray Eagle Award, as the most senior active naval aviator from 1928 until his retirement. He was enshrined in the National Aviation Hall of Fame in 1966, the International Aerospace Hall of Fame in 1973, the Naval Aviation Hall of Honor in 1981 and the Georgia Aviation Hall of Fame in 2004.

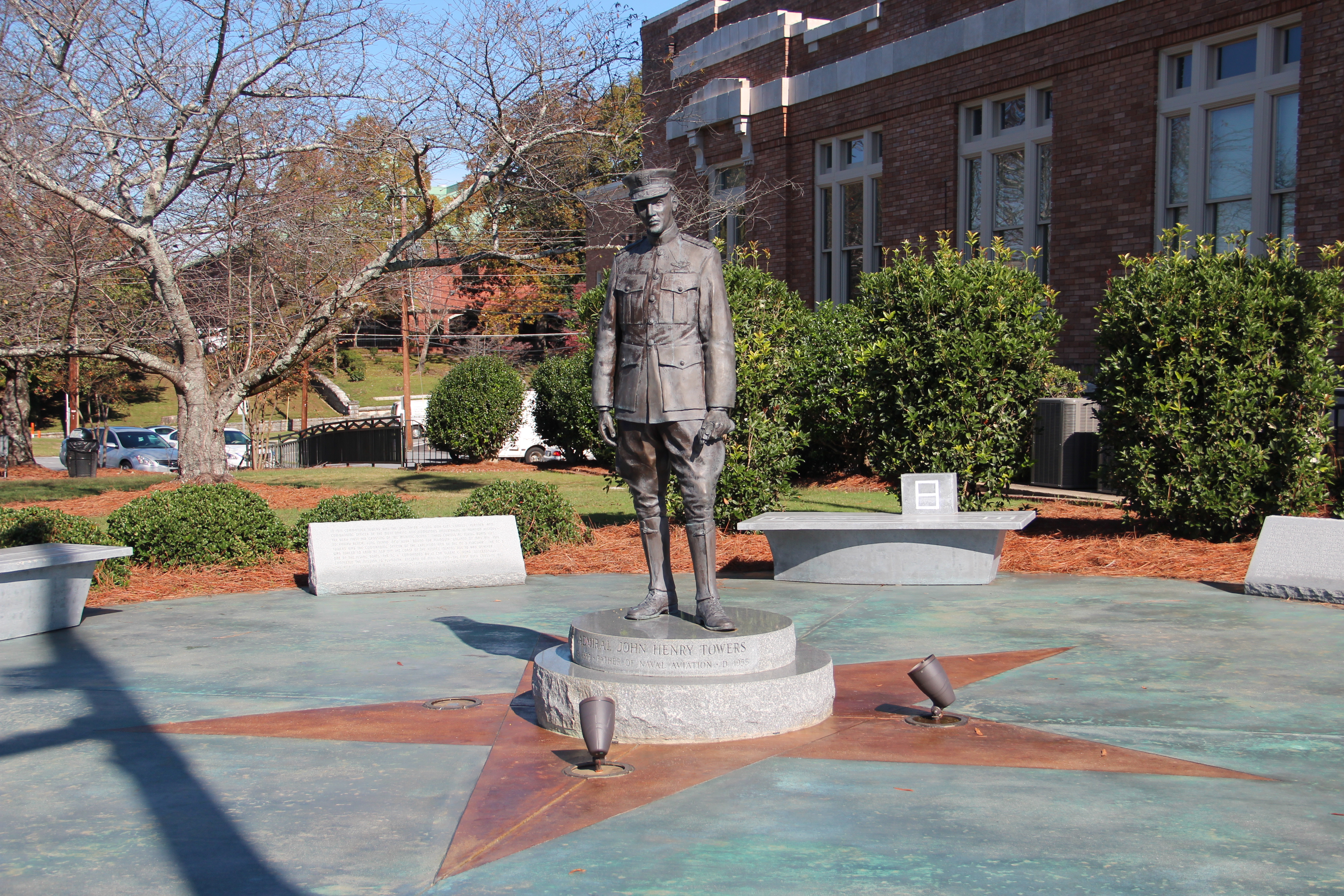
Statue of Towers in Rome, Georgia by Bob Rasmussen

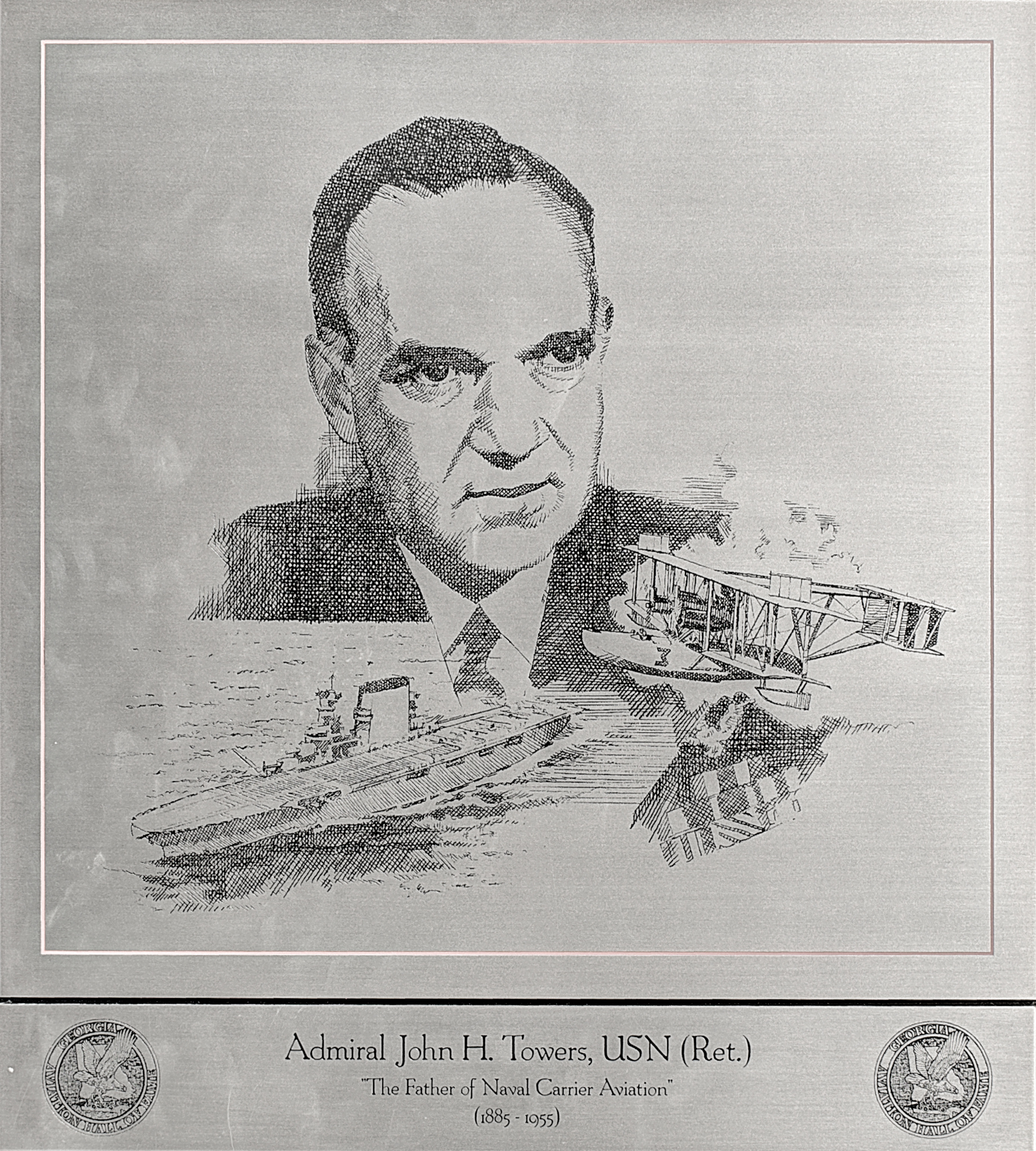
Plaque of Towers at the Georgia Aviation Hall of Fame

The decorations and medals he earned during his career include the following:

Naval Aviator Badge
1st row	Navy Cross with one 5/16 inch star	Navy Distinguished Service Medal	Legion of Merit
2nd row	NC-4 Medal	Cuban Pacification Medal	Mexican Service Medal
3rd row	World War I Victory Medal	American Defense Service Medal	American Campaign Medal
4th row	Asiatic-Pacific Campaign Medal with two 3/16 inch service stars	World War II Victory Medal	Navy Occupation Medal
5th row	Commander of the Order of the British Empire	Air Force Cross (United Kingdom)	Commander of the Order of the Tower and Sword (Portugal)

== Namesakes ==
USS Towers (DDG-9), a guided missile destroyer that saw action in the Vietnam War, was named in his honor. A crater on the moon was named in his honor by the Apollo 17 mission. Towers Field at Jacksonville Naval Air Station in Jacksonville, Florida, is named for him, as is the air field at Richard B. Russell Regional Airport, Rome, Georgia. A pool located on the United States Pacific Fleet command section of Pearl Harbor is named after him.

== See also ==
- Theodore G. Ellyson - Naval Aviator No. 1
- Eugene Burton Ely - First aviator to successfully takeoff and land from a ship
- William A. Moffett - First commander of the U.S. Navy's Bureau of Aeronautics & father of U.S. Naval aviation
- Albert Cushing Read - Commander of the first transatlantic flight (1919)
- John Rodgers - Naval Aviator No. 2, commander of first flight to Hawaii (1925)

Military offices
Preceded by Raymond A. Spruance	Commander in Chief of the United States Pacific Fleet; 1946–1947	Succeeded by Louis E. Denfeld
Preceded by None	Commander in Chief, United States Pacific Command; 1946–1947	Succeeded by Louis E. Denfeld
