= Curtiss O =

Curtiss engine

Curtiss Model "O" Aero Engine
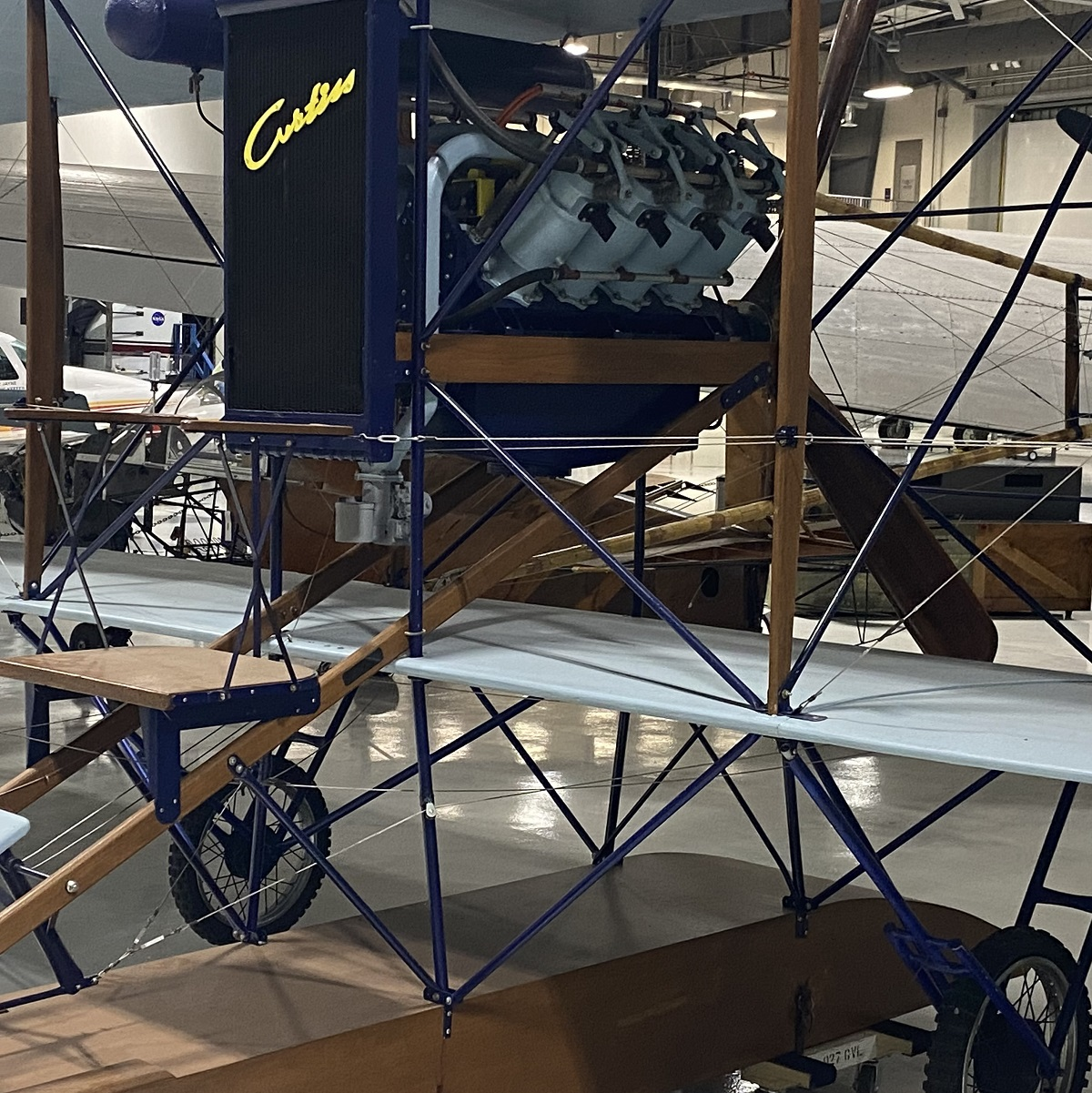
- Replica of a Curtiss Model "O" engine
- Type: V8 piston engine
- National origin: United States
- Manufacturer: Curtiss Aeroplane and Motor Company
- First run: 1911
- Developed from: Curtiss L
- Developed into: Curtiss OX

The Curtiss O was a 75 hp (56 kW) water-cooled V8 aero-engine, which was the basis of the commercially successful Curtiss OX series of engines.

== Design and development ==
In 1909 Glenn Curtiss won the inaugural Gordon Bennett Trophy flying a Curtiss racing biplane powered by a V8 engine featuring a cross-flow OHV configuration (two overhead valves, one rocker, one push-pull rod per cylinder). At that time most of Curtiss’s competitors were using less-efficient suction intake valves.

Curtiss continued the development of their V8 OHV engines with demand for higher power outputs being driven by the US Navy’s requirement for seaplanes. By 1912 Curtiss V8’s were developing 75 hp at 1,100 rpm and were known as the Model O.

The Model O featured separate operation of the inlet and exhaust valves and a noticeably longer crankcase than the earlier Model L. Engine lubrication was also more advanced with an oil reservoir cast in the lower half of the crankcase from where a submerged rotary pump forced lubricating oil directly to all the bearings through a hollow crankshaft and camshaft. The connecting rods were also hollow allowing oil to be pumped directly to the wrist pin bearings and cylinder walls. Both fuel and lube oil consumption were low by contemporary standards.

The Model O was further developed to achieve 90 hp at 1,200 rpm at which time it was designated as the Curtiss Model OX. Curtiss OX production started in 1913 and it became the first mass produced American aero engine series. The most successful engine in the series was the Curtiss OX-5 which powered many early American aircraft including the Curtiss Jenny, the standard trainer used by American and Canadian forces during World War One.

== Applications ==
- Curtiss Model E-8-75 Amphibious Aircraft
- Curtiss Model F Flying Boat. 1912 prototypes and 1913 models fitted with Curtiss "O“ engine.
- Curtiss Model G Tractor Biplane. Two aircraft completed for the US signal corps. 1st aircraft (No.21) fitted with 75 hp Curtiss O engine driving a 3 blade propeller through a chain speed reduction system. 2nd aircraft (No 22) fitted with a 90 hp direct drive Curtiss OX engine.

== Specifications ==
Data from Angle and Aeronautics

=== General characteristics ===
- Type: 8-cylinder water-cooled Vee piston engine
- Bore: 4 in (102 mm)
- Stroke: 5 in (127 mm)
- Displacement: 500 cu in (8.2 L)
- Dry weight: 275 lb (125 kg)

=== Components ===
- Valvetrain: One intake and one exhaust valve per cylinder, pushrod-actuated
- Cooling system: Water-cooled

=== Performance ===
- Power output: 75 hp (56 kW) at 1,100 rpm
- Fuel consumption: 4 U.S. gal (15 L) per hour
- Oil consumption: 1 U.S. gal (4 L) per hour

== See also ==
- List of aircraft engines
