= Washington Irving Chambers =

US Navy officer (1856–1934)

Captain Washington Irving Chambers
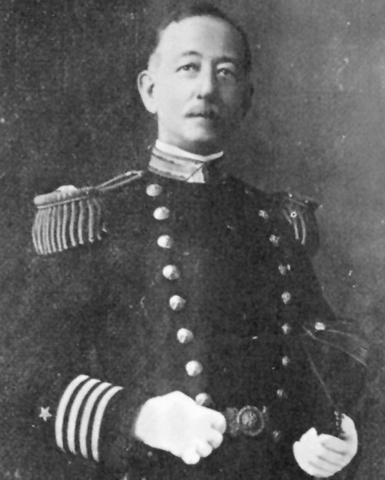
- Captain Washington Irving Chambers
- Born: April 4, 1856; Kingston, New York, US
- Died: September 23, 1934 (aged 78); Chillicothe, Ohio, US
- Burial place: Arlington National Cemetery
- Relatives: CAPT Irving Reynolds Chambers, USN (1893-1979), (son)
- Military career
- Allegiance: United States of America
- Branch: United States Navy
- Service years: 1876–1919
- Rank: Captain
- Nickname: "the Father of Naval Aviation"
- Commands: USS Frolic; USS Nashville; USS Florida; USS Louisiana
- Conflicts: Spanish–American War; Philippines – Moro Rebellion; Cuban Pacification; World War I

Captain Washington Irving Chambers, USN (April 4, 1856 – September 23, 1934) was a 43-year, career United States Navy officer, who near the end of his service played a major role in the early development of U.S. naval aviation, serving as the first officer to have oversight of the Navy's incipient aviation program through the Bureau of Navigation. In that capacity from 1910 to 1913, he consulted and worked with early civil aviation pioneers Orville Wright and Glenn Curtiss; organized the first airplane landing (1911) and takeoff (1910) from a ship in collaboration with pioneer aviator Eugene Ely; recruited the first naval aviators; established aviator training; oversaw the first budget appropriation of $25,000 from which he purchased the first aircraft for the Navy; designed a catapult to launch aircraft from warships and led a Board that recommended establishment of the first naval air station at Pensacola, Florida and advocated for the establishment of a "national aerodynamic laboratory". Chambers has been called "the Father of Naval Aviation".

== Early life and education ==
Washington Irving Chambers was born in Kingston, New York, in 1856, the only child of a boot maker, Jacob Chambers (1812-1882), and his wife, Margaret Ann (nee Ayres) (1817-1903), both native New Yorkers. Through his father, he was a descendant of Louis DuBois, a Huguenot settler who helped found New Paltz, New York, and the Hasbrouck family. Chambers was named after the prominent 19th Century New York author Washington Irving, often called "the Father of American Literature", himself named after George Washington, the American Revolutionary War general and first president of the United States, who is historically regarded as "the Father of his Country".

In June 1871, Washington Chambers was appointed a cadet midshipman to the US Naval Academy at Annapolis, Maryland, from New York's 13th congressional district. He completed the four year academic course in June 1876 when he was 20 years old and graduated as a Passed Midshipman, required to spend two years at sea before commissioning as an ensign.

In November 1892, Chambers was sent to study and teach at the Naval War College. After graduating, he remained on staff until November 1893.

== Naval career ==
Early in his career as an ensign, Chambers distinguished himself as one of six officers attached to USS Thetis under Captain Winfield Scott Schley, who led the four-ship Greely Relief Expedition in 1884 that located and rescued U.S. Army First Lieutenant Adolphus Greely and the six other survivors of the Lady Franklin Bay Expedition five miles off Cape Sabine in Smith Sound, an uninhabited Arctic sea passage between Greenland and Canada's northernmost island, Ellesmere on June 22, 1884. Over the next twenty-five years, in shore duty that alternated with his sea duty, to include teaching at the Naval War College, the Torpedo Station at Newport, Rhode Island, and Assistant Chief of the Bureau of Ordnance (1907–09), Chambers contributed to the design of torpedoes and the Navy's first all-big-gun battleships, cementing his reputation as one of the Navy's leading intellects and technology innovators, as well as a savvy navigator of the Navy's labyrinthine bureaucracy, which put him in good stead to advocate for naval air against early skepticism and resistance. On January 8, 1914, he was detached from Bureau of Navigation, and to the Division of Operations, Navy Department, for special duty. During this period of service, recommendations to the Navy Department caused the Office of the Chief of Naval Operations to be set up (1915) and Captain Chambers continued to serve under the first Chief, William S. Benson, throughout the World War, and until relieved of active duty on November 8, 1919.

== Personal life ==
On December 3, 1892, Chambers married Isabella Reynolds (1863–1945) at Kingston, NY. They had one child, Irving Reynolds Chambers (1893-1979), who was also a career naval officer. Following Captain Chambers's retirement from active duty in the Navy, he and his wife resided in Washington, D.C. At the time of his death on September 23, 1934, in Chillicothe, Ohio, he was returning by train to Washington from a trip to San Diego, California. He was survived by his wife and son. Both Chambers men and their wives are buried in Arlington National Cemetery.

=== Irving Reynolds Chambers ===
Irving Chambers was given the nickname "Skipper" by his father and graduated from the Naval Academy in 1915. He served 31 years in the Navy, attaining the rank of captain. Irving Chambers qualified as a submarine officer, and as a lieutenant in 1921 commanding the submarine USS R-6 (SS-83), he was the last man off the boat when it sank at San Pedro Bay (California) due to a malfunctioning torpedo tube door on September 26 that year. Chambers, an excellent swimmer, remained in the water to assist some of his men who were struggling. Following a board of inquiry, he was cleared of any culpability for the accident, which claimed two sailors' lives. The submarine was refloated two weeks later, on October 13, and returned to service until its decommissioning 24-years later in October 1945.

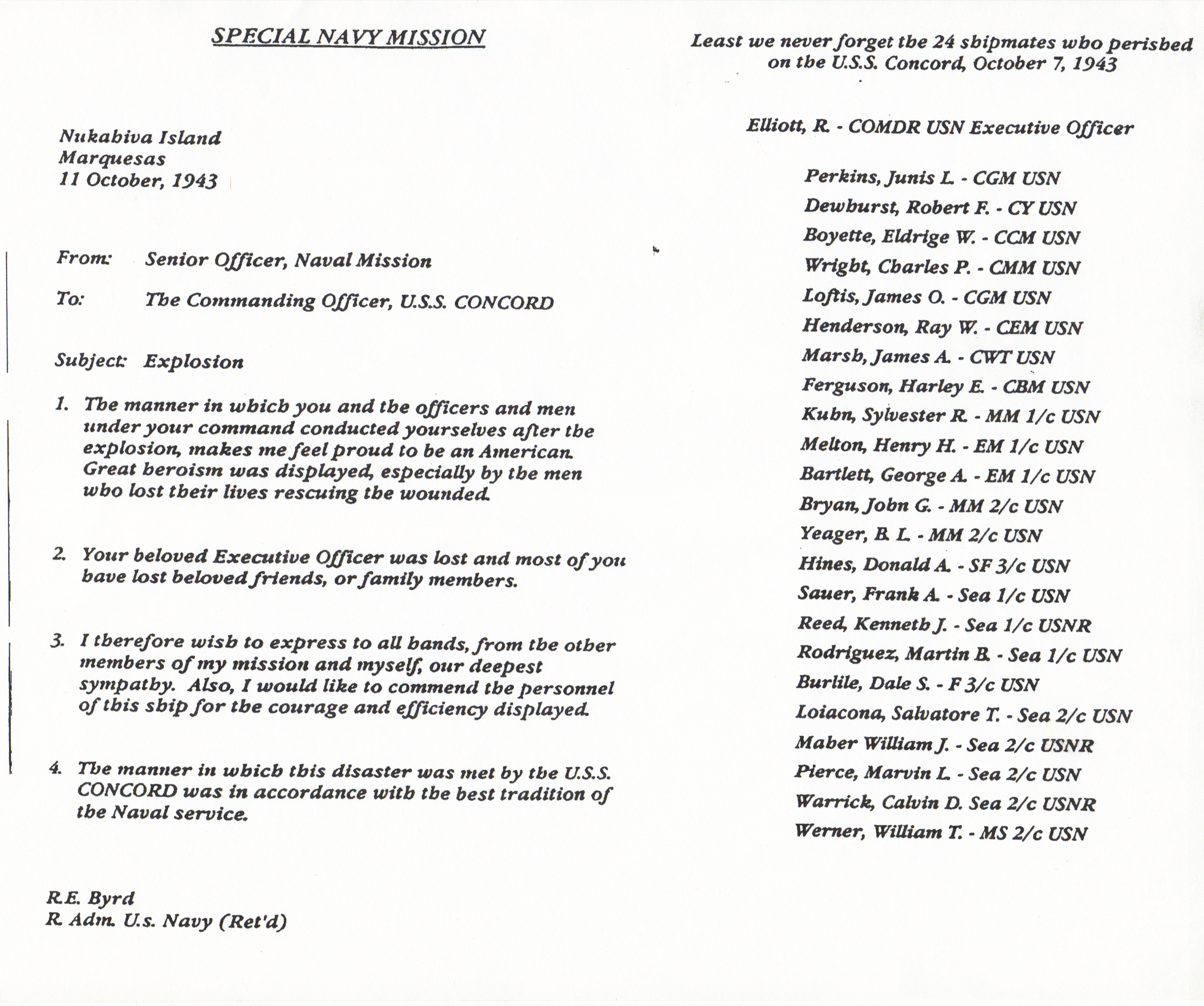
Letter from RADM Richard E. Byrd to Captain Irving R. Chambers, Commanding Officer, USS Concord, commemorating the loss of 24 men during Byrd's special mission to reconnoiter South Sea islands during September–December 1943.

Promoted to captain in 1940, Irving Chambers's last sea command was the light cruiser USS Concord (CL-10) from July 13, 1942 to December 16, 1943. From August 27 to December 5, 1943, famed polar explorer and retired Rear Admiral Richard E. Byrd and his team embarked on Concord from Balboa, the western terminus of the Panama Canal, for a special mission to conduct a highly secret survey of 33 South Pacific islands to identify potential sites for refueling bases for military use and for post-World War II commercial flights. Byrd had been recalled to active duty on March 26, 1942, and served as the confidential advisor to Admiral Ernest J. King and on the South Pacific Island Base Inspection Board. A large explosion at sea on October 7, 1943, took the lives of 24 Concord crewmen, including the executive officer, Commander Rogers Elliott. Caused by ignition of gasoline fumes at the stern of the ship, the explosion threw some men overboard, while others were killed from concussion, burns, fractured skulls, and broken necks. Several sailors died while trying to save their shipmates. The dead were buried at sea on October 8. On October 23, 1943, Byrd wrote a letter from Nuku Hiva, the largest of the Marquesas Islands in French Polynesia, to Chambers, as the ship's commanding officer, commending him and his crew "for the courage and efficiency" displayed following the explosion that made Byrd "feel proud to be an American. Great heroism was displayed, especially by the men who lost their lives rescuing the wounded."

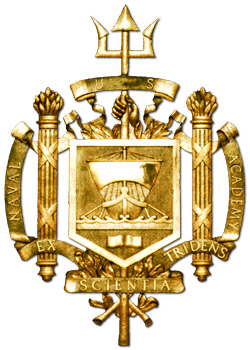
United States Naval Academy Midshipman – Class of 1876

Ensign	Lieutenant, Junior Grade	Lieutenant	Lieutenant Commander	Commander	Captain
O-1	O-2	O-3	O-4	O-5	O-6
November 30, 1878	January 1, 1886	May 29, 1891	July 13, 1899	April 21, 1905	December 7, 1908
Captain Chambers was involuntarily placed on the "retired list" in late 1913, making him ineligible for promotion to flag officer, although he remained on active duty. On January 8, 1914, he was detached from Bureau of Navigation, and to the Division of Operations, Navy Department, for special duty. During this period of service, recommendations to the Navy Department caused the Office of the Chief of Naval Operations to be set up (1915) and Captain Chambers continued to serve under the first Chief throughout the World War, and until relieved of active duty on November 8, 1919.

== Legacy ==
- Naval Station Norfolk Chambers Field at Norfolk, Virginia, dedicated in June 1938, was named in his honor.
- On December 2, 2008, Secretary of the Navy Donald Winter announced that the eleventh ship of the Lewis and Clark class of dry-cargo-ammunition vessels would be named for Captain Chambers. On September 11, 2010, USNS Washington Chambers (T-AKE-11), was christened and launched, sponsored by Mrs. Loretta Penn. Washington Chambers was placed in service on February 23, 2011, with Captain Mike Flanagan, commanding.
- Many of his papers are held by the U.S. Library of Congress. The "Washington Irving Chambers papers" consist of 12,000 documents in 48 containers occupying 12 linear feet. They encompass correspondence, memoranda, logbooks, subject files, printed matter, blueprints, photographs, and other papers relating to Chambers's service in the U.S. Navy and with the Greely Relief Expedition to the Arctic in 1884 and the Nicaragua Canal survey expedition of 1884–1885. Documents include his service aboard USS Pensacola (screw steamer) and USS Portsmouth (sloop of war) as well as at the U.S. Naval War College, New York Naval Shipyard, United States Naval Torpedo Station (Newport, R.I), and U.S. Navy Department offices including the Bureau of Ordinance and the Bureau of Navigation. Subjects include the development and application of aviation to naval forces, flight science and procedures, balloons, dirigibles, helicopters, parachutes, ordnance, and ship construction. Correspondents include Thomas S. Baldwin, W. Starling Burgess, Glenn Hammond Curtiss, Theodore Gordon Ellyson (U.S. naval aviator #1), Eugene Ely, Louis Godard, Roy Knabenshue, Grover Loening, Glenn L. Martin, James Means, Holden Chester Richardson, John Rodgers (U.S. naval aviator #2), and John H. Towers (U.S. naval aviator #3).
- Irving Reynolds Chambers, then a Navy commander, in the late 1930s donated his father's extensive original photo collection of United States naval aviation to the Office of Naval Records and Library at Washington, D.C. The collection is known as the "Washington Irving Chambers Collection" and consists of several hundred images of early naval aviation from the years 1911 to 1913, with specific emphasis on first test flights of the A-1, A-2, & A-3, the first aircraft built for the Navy, taking off on Keuka Lake at Hammondsport, New York; the C-1, the Navy's first flying boat at Hammondsport; testing of the A-1 at Annapolis; launching of the C-2 flying boat in Pensacola; modifications of the A-1 and A-2 Hydro OWL; the Curtiss twin-engine flying boat, the America; the Curtiss Tractor Landplane; the Gallaudet Bullet; and the Wright Model G Aeroboat.
- President Ronald Reagan, by Proclamation 5473, declared May 8, 1986 "Naval Aviation Day", stating in part, "May 8 marks the seventy-fifth anniversary of naval aviation in the United States. On that day in 1911, Captain Washington Irving Chambers prepared the requisition for the first aircraft for the United States Navy, thereby initiating a long and glorious tradition. Since that date, naval aviation has played an essential role in our national defense, both in peace and war. Naval aviation also has played a vital role in the development of space exploration and aviation technology. . . . "
