= Theodore G. Ellyson =

First United States Navy officer to be designated as a "naval aviator" (1885–1928)

Theodore Gordon Ellyson
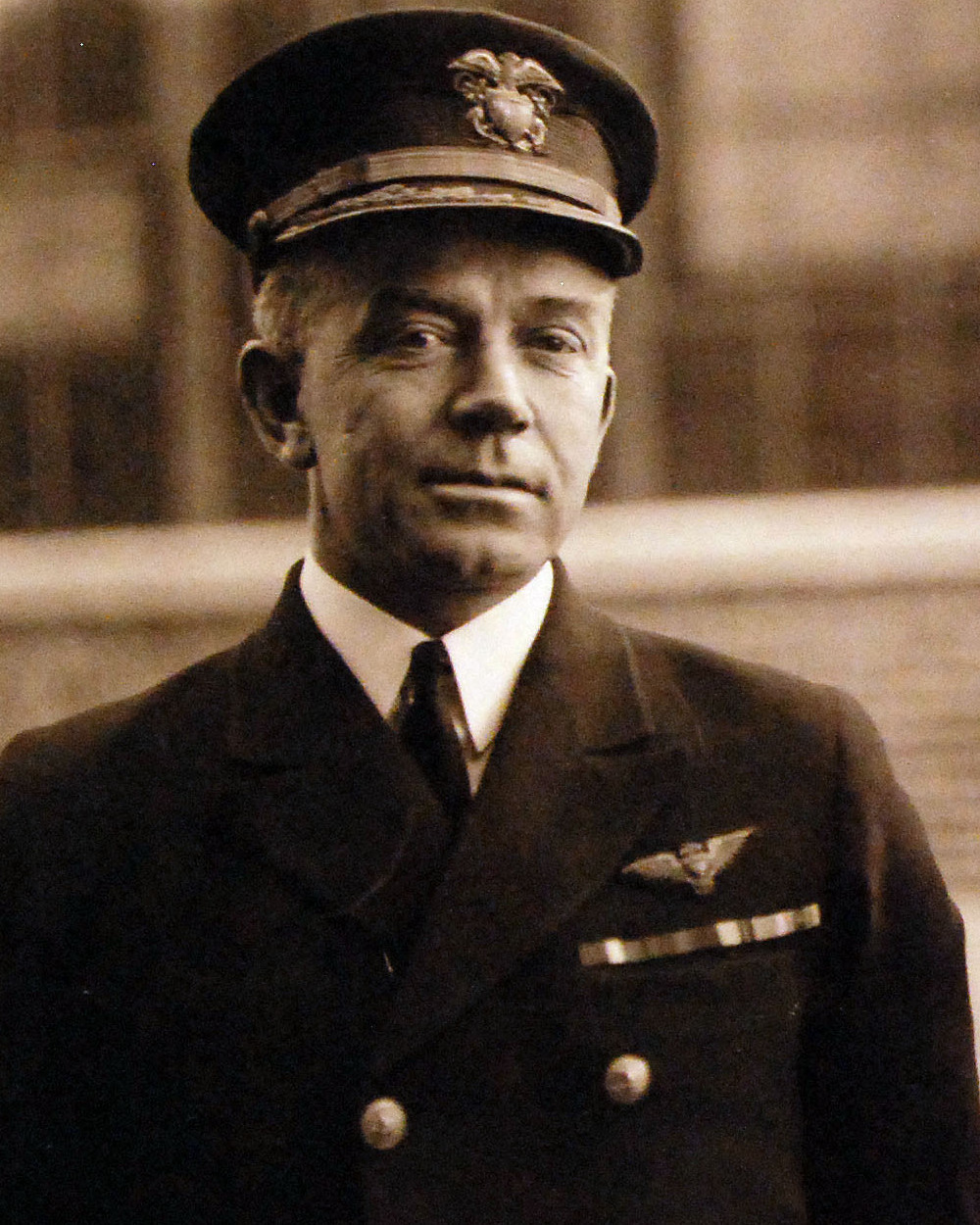
- Born: February 27, 1885; Richmond, Virginia, U.S.
- Died: February 27, 1928 (aged 43); Chesapeake Bay, U.S.
- Burial place: United States Naval Academy Cemetery
- Military career
- Allegiance: United States
- Branch: United States Navy
- Service years: 1905–1928
- Rank: Commander
- Nickname: Spuds
- Conflicts: World War I
- Awards: Navy Cross

Theodore Gordon "Spuds" Ellyson, USN (February 27, 1885 – February 27, 1928), was the first United States Navy officer designated as an aviator ("Naval Aviator No. 1"). Ellyson served in the experimental development of aviation in the years before and after World War I. He also spent several years before the war as part of the Navy's new submarine service.

A recipient of the Navy Cross for his antisubmarine service in World War I, Ellyson died in 1928 when his aircraft crashed over the Chesapeake Bay.

== Early life and pre-aviation naval career ==
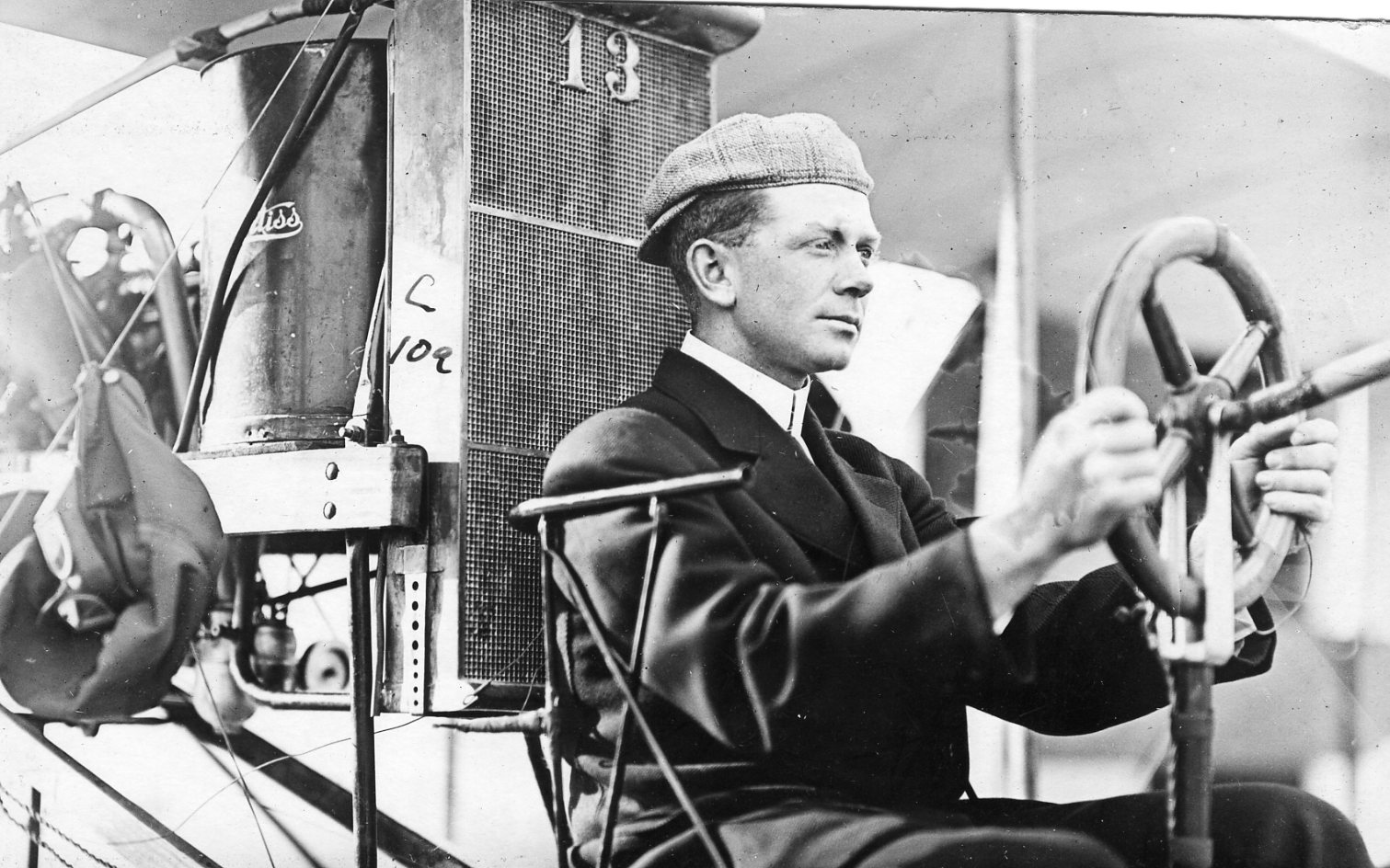
Ellyson circa 1910–1915

Born in Richmond, Virginia, Ellyson entered the United States Naval Academy in 1901 and graduated with the class of 1905. Among his classmates were several future World War II admirals including: Harold G. Bowen Sr., Arthur B. Cook, Wilhelm L. Friedell, William R. Furlong, Stanford C. Hooper, Royal E. Ingersoll, Herbert F. Leary, Byron McCandless, John H. Newton, Chester W. Nimitz, Harry E. Shoemaker, John M. Smeallie, John W. Wilcox Jr. and Walter B. Woodson. During the five years following his graduation, he served on USS Texas and USS Missouri; as Watch and Division Officer of USS Pennsylvania and later USS Colorado; and on USS West Virginia, USS Rainbow, and USS Shark on the Asiatic Station.

After his return to the United States in April 1910, he commanded the USS Tarantula until November of that year, and then had duty in connection with fitting out the submarine USS Seal at Newport News Shipbuilding and Drydock Company. He commanded her briefly after her commissioning on December 2, 1910.

== Naval Aviator Number One ==
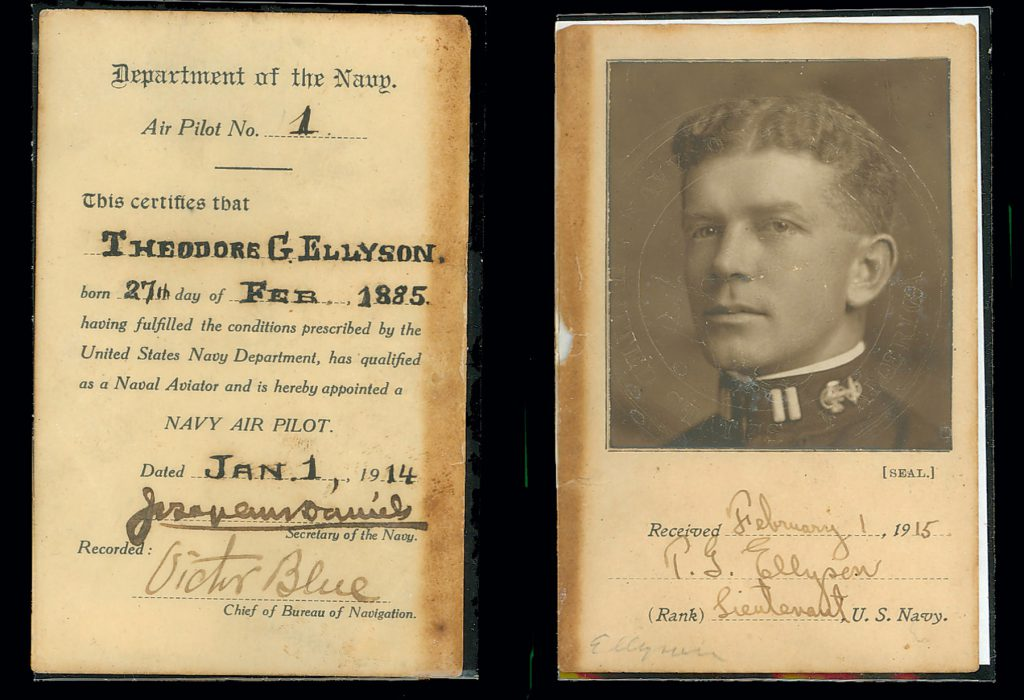
Ellyson's Navy Air Pilot No. 1 license

In December 1910, Ellyson was ordered by Captain Washington I. Chambers, the Navy's first director of naval aviation, to North Island, San Diego, California for instruction in aviation under Glenn Curtiss. While at an Aero Club show on January 28, 1911 near the flight school, Ellyson took off in a Curtiss "grass cutter" plane to become the first Naval aviator. With a blocked throttle, this ground plane was not supposed to fly, and Ellyson was not proficient enough to fly. He slewed off left, cracking up the plane somewhat by making a wing-first landing. However, Ellyson was not injured and from then on he was considered to have made his first flight on this date. He also cooperated with Curtiss in the design of a pontoon for aircraft, and after Curtiss' first flight on January 27, 1911, Ellyson went up with Curtiss in February to become the first passenger to go aloft in a floatplane. Later that month, he participated in experiments demonstrating the potential use of floatplanes from ships, when the aircraft was hoisted on board USS Pennsylvania and subsequently lowered to the water for its return flight to North Island.

LT Ellyson became first aviator in history to qualify as a pilot according to Federation Aeronautique Internationale (FAI) standards in a flight over water. In the presence of a committee of the Aero Club of America, he was required to fly five figure eights around two flags buoyed 1500 feet apart and land within 150 feet of an established mark. This course had to be completed twice. When Ellyson qualified, he landed directly alongside his mark, a white flag buoyed by a bottle. His second landing was within ten feet of his first. The test also required the prospective aviator to climb to a minimum altitude of 150 ft (officially 50 meters). Ellyson made this twice on his test. On September 7, 1911, LT Ellyson, in the Navy model A-1 Triad, slid down 150 ft on a wire cable at Hammondsport, New York from a platform 25 ft high, and was safely launched out over Keuka Lake.

From the time Ellyson began instruction in aviation until April 29, 1913, he devoted all of his time to active flying and experimental work in aviation. This included the establishment of Naval Aviation Camps at Annapolis in September 1911 when, with then-Lieutenant John H. Towers, he flew an aircraft from Annapolis to Milford Haven, Virginia, a nonstop distance record for float planes.

== World War I service ==
In 1917, he had duty at the Naval Academy and with the midshipmen on cruise on USS Wyoming and USS Kansas. On February 14, 1918, he was detached for duty at the Submarine Chaser Base, New London, Connecticut, and in June arrived in London for duty with a submarine chaser squadron at U.S. Naval Base 27 at Plymouth. Ellyson was awarded the Navy Cross for distinguished service in World War I for his development of successful tactics for the submarine chaser squadron.

== Postwar service and death ==
Following the armistice in 1918, he remained in the European Area, commanding Nucleus Crew 14 (zeppelin) from March to May 1919. Upon his return to the United States, he assisted in fitting out the destroyer USS J. Fred Talbott at William Cramp and Sons, and served on that vessel as commanding officer from the time of her commissioning in June 1919 until July 1920. During the next five months, he commanded the USS Little and USS Brooks.

On January 10, 1921, he was ordered to Hampton Roads, Virginia, to serve for eight months as executive officer of the Naval Air Station, Naval Operating Base. The Bureau of Aeronautics was established in the Navy Department on September 1, 1921, and on October 21, Commander Ellyson became head of the plans division of that bureau. He remained in that assignment until December 1922, when he became the aviation member of the U.S. Naval Mission to Brazil, cooperating in the reorganization of the Brazilian Navy. He returned to the Bureau of Aeronautics in May 1925.

On July 20, 1925, he assumed command of Torpedo Squadron 1 and from March to June 1926 was executive officer of USS Wright, a seaplane tender. On June 23, 1926, he was ordered to duty in connection with the fitting out of USS Lexington, the Navy's second aircraft carrier, and was on board when she was placed in commission.

Commander Ellyson was killed on February 27, 1928, his 43rd birthday, in the crash of a Loening OL-7 aircraft in the lower Chesapeake Bay while on a night flight from Norfolk, Virginia, to Annapolis, Maryland. His body washed ashore and was recovered in April 1928. He was buried in the United States Naval Academy Cemetery.

== Legacy ==
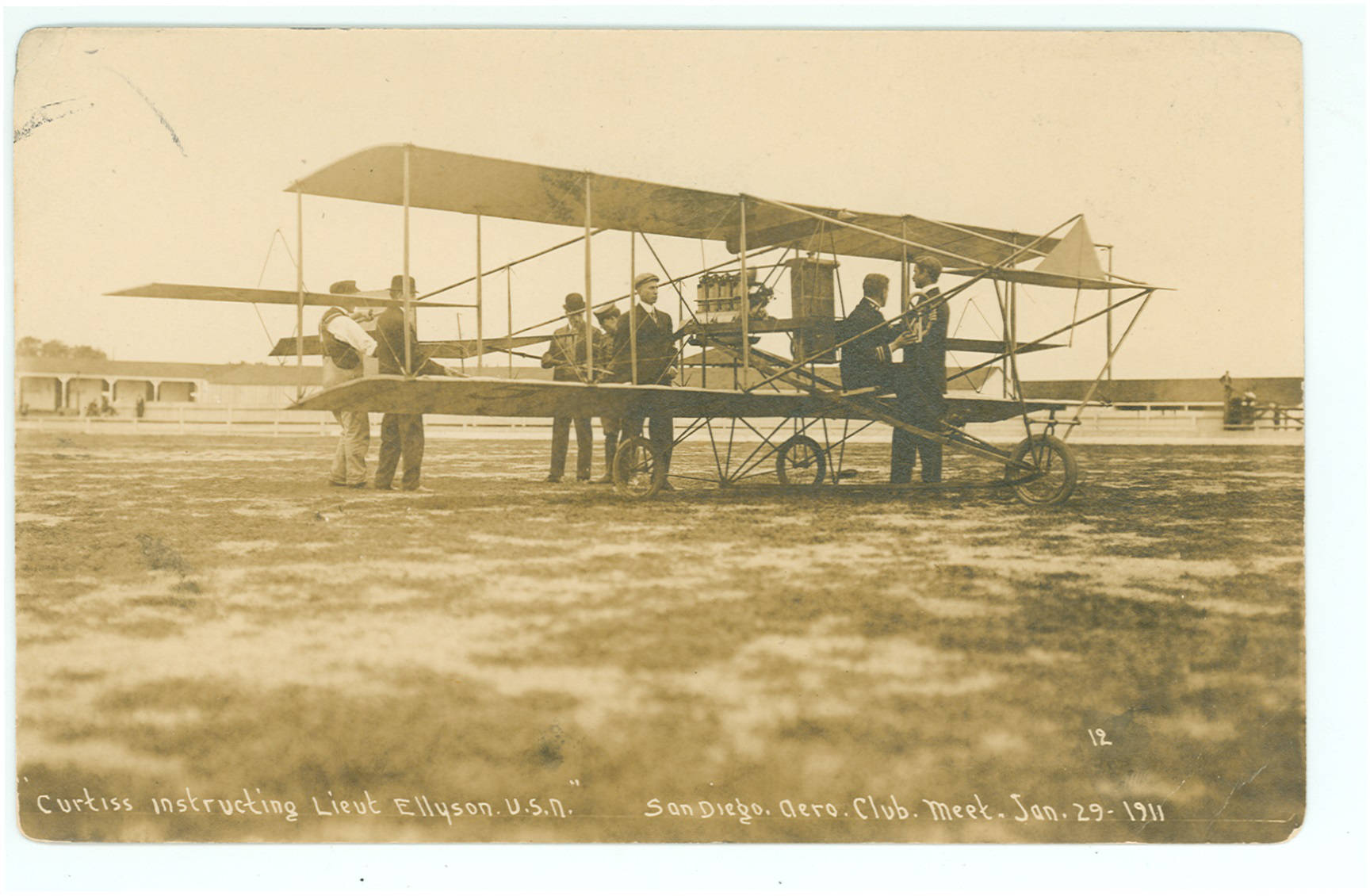
Ellyson receiving instruction from Glenn Curtiss in 1911

In 1941, the destroyer USS Ellyson was named in his honor. The vessel was launched on July 25, 1941 by the Federal Shipbuilding and Dry Dock Company in Kearny, New Jersey, and sponsored by the commander's daughter, Miss Gordon Ellyson. The ship was commissioned on November 28, 1941 with Lieutenant Commander J.B. Rooney in command. In 1961, Ellyson was designated the recipient of the Gray Eagle Award for the period 1911 to 1928, when he was the senior active Naval Aviator. In 1965, Ellyson was enshrined in the National Aviation Hall of Fame in Dayton, Ohio.

On October 7, 2019, the Naval Academy dedicated an airpark complete with an F-14A, EA-6B, A-4A, and F-4J as Ellyson Park. Ellyson is buried only a short distance away.

The Coronado Street Course, a NASCAR track located at Naval Air Station North Island, begins and concludes with the Ellyson Start/Finish Line named in his honor.

== See also ==
- John Alcock – British commander of the first non-stop transatlantic flight (1919)
- Eugene Burton Ely – First aviator to successfully takeoff and land from a ship
- William A. Moffett – First commander of the U.S. Navy's Bureau of Aeronautics & father of U.S. Naval aviation
- Albert Cushing Read – U.S. commander of the first transatlantic flight (1919)
- John Rodgers – U.S. Naval Aviator No. 2, commander of first flight to Hawaii (1925)
- John Henry Towers – U.S. Naval Aviator No. 3
