= Curtiss Model E =

Early aircraft model

Model E
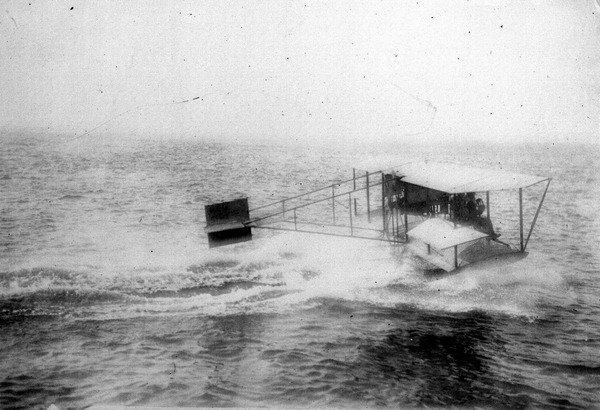
- The A-1, the United States Navy's first aircraft

General information
- Type: Utility aircraft
- Manufacturer: Curtiss Aeroplane Company
- Designer: Glenn Curtiss

History
- First flight: 25 February 1911

The Curtiss Model E is an early aircraft developed by Glenn Curtiss in the United States in 1911.

== Design ==
Essentially a refined and enlarged version of the later "headless" Model D, variants of the Model E made important steps in pioneering the development of seaplanes and flying boats in America. Like its predecessor, the Model E was an open-framework biplane with two-bay unstaggered wings of equal span. In landplane configuration, it was fitted with tricycle undercarriage, and as a seaplane with a large central pontoon and outriggers under the wings. Most examples of the Model E followed the pattern of the "headless" Model Ds, with elevators and horizontal stabilizer carried together in the cruciform tail unit. The large ailerons were mounted in the interplane gap, their span continuing past the wings themselves, and as before were controlled by a shoulder yoke accommodating sideways "leaning" movements by the pilot to operate them. The Model E was designed and built as a two-seater, although in practice some of the lower-powered versions were converted to single-seaters.

Black pontoons on the wingtips of A-1 slanted diagonally backward toward the water to reduce friction on water and serve to balance aircraft on water. On the bottom of each pontoon is a little hydroplane of wood measuring 3-inch wide (76 mm) by 1/4-inch thick (6.4 mm) to further aid in balance and reduce friction. The front elevator on A-1 was at the aviators feet.

Triad could skim the water at 50 miles per hour (80 km/h) and had an endurance of 150 miles (240 km). Glenn Curtiss demonstrated a capability to skim along the surface in two-foot (0.61 m) seas. CAPT Washington Irving Chambers expressed confidence in landing in “moderate seas”, but stated he would not attempt to land in them and further added that they could adapt the movements of the Triad to conform to the seas.

The increased weight and drag of the “amphibian” gear cost the Triad 5 knots (9.3 km/h; 5.8 mph) of airspeed, so the more powerful 75 horsepower (56 kW) v8 was required to maintain the speed of the land plane configuration. Altitude was unaffected.

== Operational history ==
The Model E achieved fame through examples purchased by the United States Navy. A $4,400 Model E-8-75 floatplane became the Navy's first aircraft when ordered by Captain Washington Irving Chambers on 8 May 1911 and received the designation A-1, as well as the nickname "Triad" hydroaeroplane since it could operate from land and sea and in the air. Theodore Ellyson became the Navy's first pilot when he took off from Keuka Lake near Hammondsport, New York on 30 June. In all, the Navy was to purchase some 14 Model Es, designating their earliest examples from A-1 to A-4, then redesignating these together with new purchases in the AH-1 to AH-18 block of serials. These aircraft achieved a number of firsts for the Navy, including the first cross-country flight in a seaplane, a world seaplane altitude record of 900 ft (274 m) a much later national seaplane altitude record of 6,200 ft (1,890 m), and, significantly for later naval operations, the first catapult launch of a seaplane.

The aircraft originally designated A-2 had an especially interesting career. Purchased by the Navy in landplane configuration on 13 July 1911, by August it was fitted with two long, cigar-shaped sheet metal cylinder pontoons beneath the bottom frame, about four feet from each aviator. A-2 was converted into a floatplane the following June. In this configuration it set a seaplane flight endurance record of 6 hours 10 minutes on 6 October 1912. Later that month, it was extensively rebuilt along the lines of the Curtiss Tadpole hull, thus becoming the Navy's first flying boat. Later still, retractable wheels were added to create an amphibian that became known as the OWL (standing for "Over Water and Land"). This machine was redesignated E-1 and then AX-1 by the Navy and was finally destroyed on 27 November 1915.

In addition to their naval service, the type was operated by the Aeronautical Division, U.S. Signal Corps, which purchased two examples of the Model E-4 (Signal Corps numbers S.C. 6 and 8), built a third entirely from spare parts (S.C. 23), and later acquired one of the Navy's seaplanes (AH-8). Poor safety and reliability records of pusher aircraft led to all examples being grounded on February 24, 1914, although the AH-8 was flown briefly in 1928 following a refurbishment.

An original Model E-8-75 is preserved at the EAA AirVenture Museum and flew as recently as 1984. A replica of the A-1 was started in 1956, and built by employees of Convair, Ryan and Rohr for the San Diego Air & Space Museum. It flew a number of times in 1984 before being retired for static display. Another replica was built by the Glenn H. Curtiss Museum and flown in 2004, notable for its use of Curtiss' original flight control system.

== Variants ==
- Model E-4 - version with a 40 hp (30 kW) four-cylinder engine,
- Model E-8 - version with a 60 hp (45 kW) V-8 engine,
- Model E-8-75 - version with a 75 hp (56 kW) V-8 engine.

== Operators ==
United States

- United States Navy
- Aeronautical Division, U.S. Signal Corps

== Specifications (A-1) ==
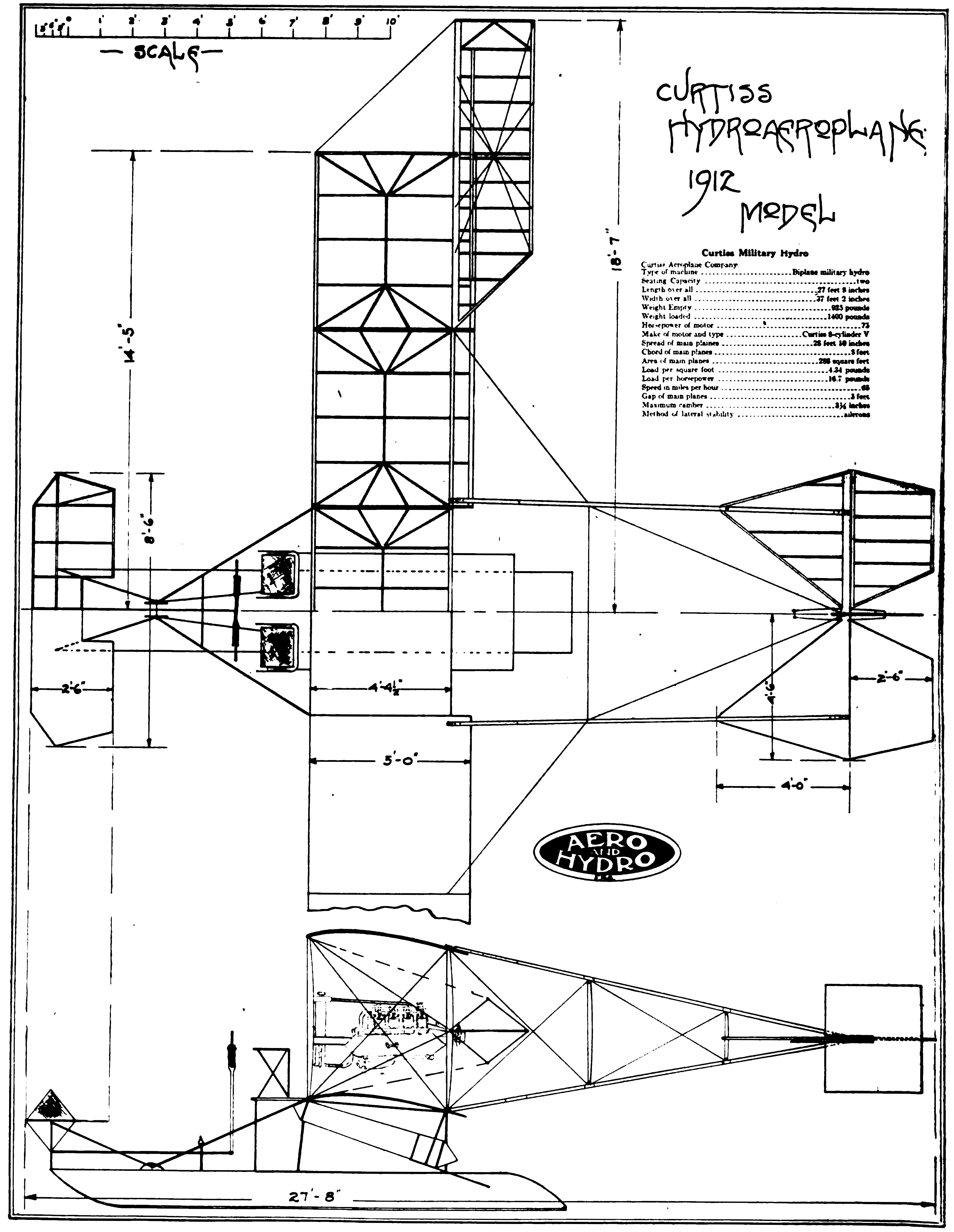
Curtiss 1912 Hydroplane 2 view from Aero and Hydro Vol. 1 p 336

Data from Aerofiles : Curtiss

General characteristics

- Crew: 1
- Capacity: 1 pax
- Length: 28 ft 8 in (8.74 m)
- Wingspan: 37 ft 0 in (11.28 m)
- Gross weight: 1,575 lb (714 kg)
- Powerplant: 1 × Curtiss O V-8 water-cooled piston engine, 75 hp (56 kW)
- Propellers: 2-bladed pusher propeller

Performance

- Maximum speed: 42 mph (68 km/h, 36 kn)
- Cruise speed: 40 mph (64 km/h, 35 kn)
- Range: 112 mi (180 km, 97 nmi)

== See also ==
Related development

- Curtiss Model F

== Bibliography ==
- Taylor, Michael J. H. (1989). Jane's Encyclopedia of Aviation. London: Studio Editions. pp. 276–78.
- World Aircraft Information Files. London: Bright Star Publishing. pp. File 891 Sheet 42–43.
