= Curtiss OX-5 =

V8 piston aircraft engine

OX-5
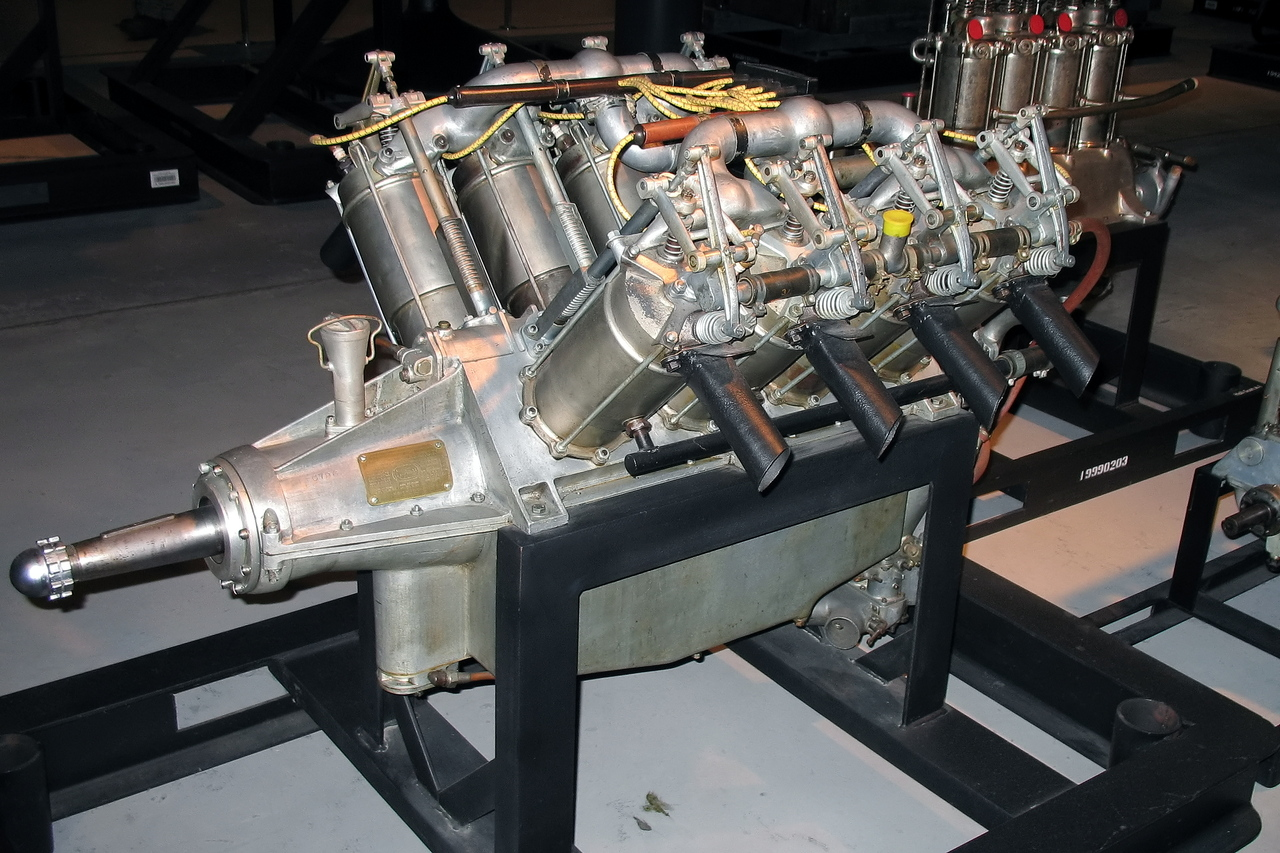
- Preserved OX-5 engine
- Type: V8 piston engine
- National origin: United States
- Manufacturer: Curtiss Aeroplane and Motor Company
- First run: 1915
- Number built: 12,600
- Developed from: Curtiss O

The Curtiss OX-5 was an early V8 American liquid-cooled aircraft engine built by Curtiss. It was the first American-designed aircraft engine to enter mass production, although it was considered obsolete when it did so in 1917. It nevertheless found widespread use on a number of aircraft, perhaps the most famous being the JN-4 "Jenny". Some 12,600 units were built through early 1919. The wide availability of the engine in the surplus market made it common until the 1930s, although it was considered unreliable for most of its service life.

== Design and development ==
The OX-5 was the last in a series of Glenn Curtiss designed V engines, which started as a series of air-cooled V-twins for motorcycles in 1902. A modified version of one of these early designs was sold as an aircraft engine in 1906, and from then on the company's primary market was aircraft. The basic design had slowly expanded by adding additional cylinders until they reached the V8 in 1906. They also started enlarging the cylinders as well, but this led to cooling problems that required the introduction of liquid cooling in 1908. These early engines used a flathead valve arrangement, which eventually gave way to a cross-flow cylinder with overhead valves in 1909, leading to improved volumetric efficiency. By this point engine design was a team effort; the team included Charles M. Manly, whose earlier Manly–Balzer engine had held the power-to-weight ratio record for 16 years. Curtiss continued the development of their V8 engines with demand for higher power outputs being largely driven by the US Navy’s requirement for seaplanes. By 1912 Curtiss V8’s were developing 75 hp (56 kW) and were known as the Curtiss Model O. The Curtiss O was further developed into the 90 hp (67 kW) Curtiss OX. OX series production began in 1913. The OX-5 was built between 1915 and 1919 and was by far the most popular OX variant.

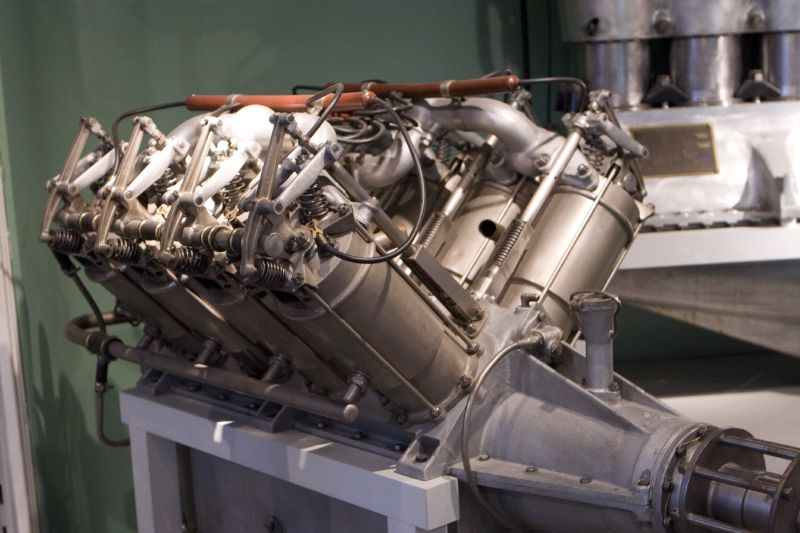
Curtiss OX-5 at Canada Aviation Museum

Like most engines of the era, the OX-5's high-temperature areas were built mostly of cast iron, using individual cylinders bolted to a single aluminum crankcase, wrapped in a cooling jacket made of a nickel-copper alloy. Later versions used a brazed-on steel jacket instead. Cylinder heads were also attached to the crankcase, using X-shaped tie-downs on the top of the head attached to the block via four long bolts. Fuel was carbureted near the rear of the engine, then piped to the cylinders via two T-shaped pipes, the cylinders being arranged so the intake ports of any two in a bank were near each other. The cylinders had one intake and one exhaust valve, the exhaust valve operated by a pushrod from a camshaft running between the banks and inlet valve operated by a pull rod/tube working from the same camshaft. This arrangement caused the outer exhaust valves to have a rather long rocker arm. The push/pullrods were arranged one inside the other, the exhaust valve rod being on the inside and the intake valve rod a tube around it. The aluminum camshaft bearings were a split type bolted together and held in place by lock screws. The pistons were cast aluminum.

The OX-5 was not considered particularly advanced, nor powerful, for its era. By this point rotary engines such as the Oberursel or Gnome-Rhône were producing about 100 hp (75 kW), and newer inlines were becoming available with 160 hp (120 kW) or more. Nevertheless, the OX-5 had fairly good fuel economy as a result of its slow RPM, which made it useful for civilian aircraft. The OX-5 was used on the Swallow Airplane Swallow, Pitcairn PA-4 Fleetwing II, Travel Air 2000, Waco 9 and 10, the American Eagle, the Buhl-Verville CW-3 Airster, and some models of the Jenny. The primary reason for its popularity was its low cost after the war, with almost-new examples selling as low as $20. It was often used in boats as well as in aircraft.

=== Reliability ===
The engine was considered unreliable, but unreliable is a relative term: aviation engine technology had not fully matured at the end of World War I. Certainly the JN4 with the OX-5 was underpowered, but the OX-5 proved a much better engine than the Hall Scott A7A that was the Achilles heel of the Standard J-1, the substitute primary trainer. In particular the valve gear was fragile, and it had no provisions for lubrication other than grease and oil applied by hand, leading to an overhaul interval as short as fifty hours. Additionally the engine featured a single spark plug in each cylinder, and a single ignition system, in an era when ignition equipment was less reliable, with dual ignition already being fitted to more advanced aviation powerplants like the French V-form Hispano-Suiza 8 and the inline-six cylinder series of Mercedes D.I through D.III German engines. Built by several contractors in large numbers, the OX-5 suffered from uneven quality control. However, while the overwhelming majority of training accidents in the U.S. were in JN-4s, this was because JN-4s were flown by the vast majority of trainee pilots, and the accident rate in the US for primary training was four times less than the advanced training rate in France (virtually all US airmen getting advanced training in France), approximately 2800 flying hours in the US primarily in OX-5 powered JN-4s per fatality to 761 hours per fatality in France in other types. Very few fatal accidents were caused by engine failure, although the lack of power may have been the cause of the many stall and spins that took about forty five percent of training lives. Anyone seeing a JN-4 today struggling into the air with an OX-5 can see very quickly that the JN-4 had to be flown in a narrow envelope. Also, the replacement of the A7A in Standard J-1s was contemplated, but the cost of $2,000 per aircraft compared with the need (by the time the J-1s were grounded in June 1918 JN-4s were in sufficient supply) led to the rejection of this idea. The successful civilian post-war use of the OX-5 (even in civilian purchased and converted J-1s) was due to its relative reliability in the more aerodynamically advanced designs of the 1920s, its simplicity of operation, and its low cost. By comparison the Hall Scott A7A created such a bad impression during the war that very few, if any, were used by civilian operators.

The OX-5 itself would be replaced by the well-proven Wright Aeronautical-built version of the 150 hp (110 kW) Hispano-Suiza HS-8a V8 engine in the nearly 930 examples of the later production Curtiss JN-4H Jenny biplanes.

== Engines on display ==
- A Curtis OX-5 engine is on public display at the Aerospace Museum of California.
- A Curtis OX-5 modified for marine use, reportedly in a Chris Craft, is on public display at the Iowa Great Lakes Maritime Museum.
- A Curtis OX-5 engine is on public display at the Military Aviation Preservation Society (MAPS) Museum in Green, Ohio near the Akron/Canton Airport.
- A Curtis OX-5 engine, gifted by Wesley Talent, is on display at the Udvar-Hazy center.
- an OX-5 engine is on static display at the Shannon Air Museum in Fredericksburg, Va. They also have on display a Travel Air 2000 fitted with an OX-5

== Specifications (OX-5) ==
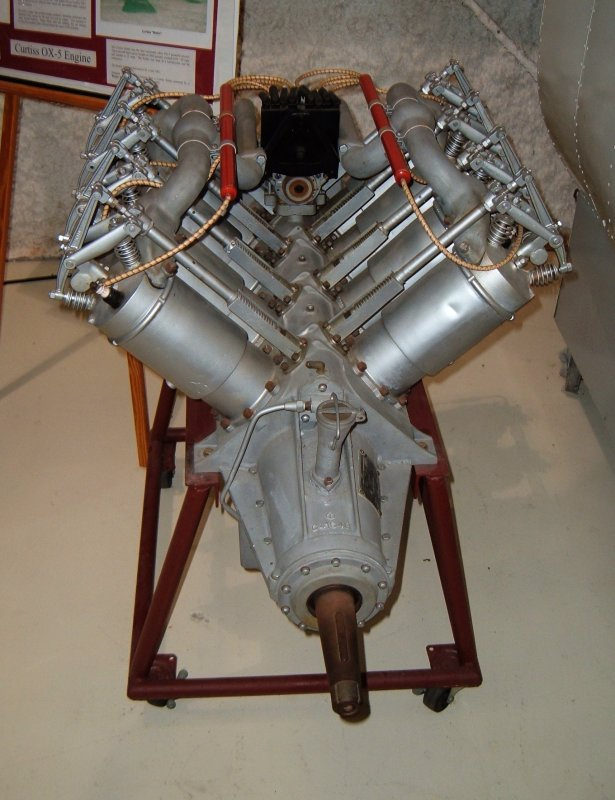
Top overhead view of OX-5 at Lone Star Flight Museum

=== General characteristics ===
- Type: 8-cylinder water-cooled 90° Vee piston engine
- Bore: 4.0 in (102 mm)
- Stroke: 5.0 in (127 mm)
- Displacement: 503 in^{3} (8.2 L)
- Length: 56.75 in (1441.45 mm)
- Width: 29.75 in (755.65 mm)
- Height: 36.75 in (933.45 mm)
- Dry weight: 390 lb (177 kg)

=== Components ===
- Valvetrain: One intake and one exhaust valve per cylinder, pushrod-actuated
- Fuel system: Duplex Zenith Carburetor
- Oil system: Gear-pump 40 to 60 psi 3-gallon sump
- Cooling system: Water-cooled

=== Performance ===
- Power output:
- 90 hp (67 kW) at 1,400 rpm
- 105 hp (78 kW) at 1,800 rpm for brief periods
- Specific power: 0.21 hp/in^{3} (9.5 kW/L)
- Compression ratio: 4.9:1
- Fuel consumption: 8.0 US gal/h (30.8 L/h) at 75% power
- Specific fuel consumption: 0.53 lb/(hp·h) (0.32 kg/(kW·h)) at 75% power
- Oil consumption: 0.5 US gal/h (1.9 L/h) at 75% power
- Power-to-weight ratio: 0.27 hp/lb (440 W/kg)
