= Curtiss Model D =

American early aircraft model introduced in 1911

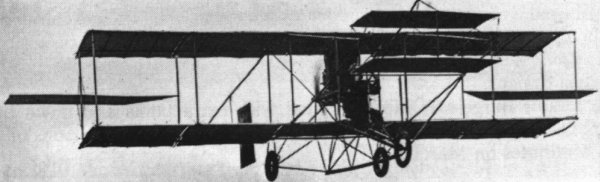
- A "headed" Curtiss Model D (Curtiss photo 1916) pusher; later "headless" models incorporated elevators around the rudder in the tail (like most aircraft since).

General information
- Manufacturer: Curtiss Aeroplane and Motor Company
- Status: Historic
- Primary user: Exhibition pilots aeronautical experimenters United States Navy; Aeronautical Division, U.S. Signal Corps

History
- Introduction date: 1911; 115 years ago

The 1911 Curtiss Model D (or frequently "Curtiss Pusher") is an early United States pusher aircraft with the engine and propeller behind the pilot's seat. It was among the first aircraft in the world to be built in any quantity, during an era of trial-and-error development and equally important parallel technical development in internal combustion engine technologies.

It was also the aircraft type to make the first takeoff from the deck of a ship (flown by Eugene B. Ely off the deck of USS Birmingham on November 14, 1910, near Hampton Roads, Virginia) and to make the first landing aboard a ship (USS Pennsylvania) on January 18, 1911, near San Francisco, California.

It was originally fitted with a foreplane for pitch control, but this was dispensed with when it was accidentally discovered to be unnecessary. The new version without the foreplane was known as the Headless Pusher.

Like all Curtiss designs, the aircraft used ailerons, which first existed on a Curtiss-designed airframe as quadruple "wing-tip" ailerons on the 1908 June Bug to control rolling in flight, thus avoiding use of the Wright brothers' patented wing-warping technology.

== Development ==
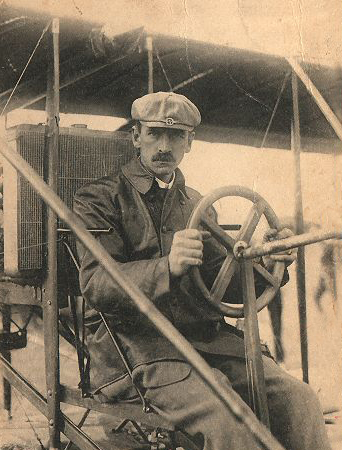
Glenn Curtiss at the controls of the Curtiss Reims Racer, which used the "shoulder cradle" apparatus shown (as his later Model D did) to operate the ailerons' control cables

The Model D was a biplane fitted with a wheeled tricycle undercarriage. The construction was primarily of spruce, with ash used in parts of the engine bearers and undercarriage beams, with doped linen stretched over it. The outrigger beams were made of bamboo. Prevented by patents from using the Wright Brothers' wing-warping technique to provide lateral control, and with neither the Wrights nor himself likely to have known about its prior patenting in 1868 England, Curtiss did not use the June Bug's "wing-tip" aileron configuration, but instead used between-the-wing-panels "interplane" ailerons, instead, as directly derived from his earlier Curtiss No. 1 and Curtiss No. 2 pushers. In the end, this proved to be a superior solution. Both the interplane and trailing-edge ailerons on these early aircraft did not use a hand- or foot-operated mechanism to operate them, but very much like the earlier Santos-Dumont 14-bis had adopted in November 1906, required the pilot to "lean into" the turn to operate the ailerons—on the Curtiss pushers, a transverse-rocking, metal framework "shoulder cradle", hinged longitudinally on either side of the pilot's seat—initially as straight metal tubes resting against the pilot's upper arms; and later achieved with "armrests" in a similar location; achieved the connection between the pilot and aileron control cabling. Almost all Model Ds were constructed with a pusher configuration, with the propeller behind the pilot. Because of this configuration, they were often referred to as "Curtiss Pushers". Early examples were built in a canard configuration, with elevators mounted on struts at the front of the aircraft in addition to a horizontal stabilizer at the rear. Later, the elevators were incorporated into the tail unit, and the canard surface arrangement dispensed with, resulting in what came to be called the Curtiss "Headless" Pushers.

In addition to amateur aviators, a Model D was purchased in April 1911 by the Aeronautical Division of the U.S. Army Signal Corps as a trainer (S.C. No. 2), and by the Navy as an airborne observation platform. A number of them were exported to foreign militaries, as well, including the Russian Navy. On November 14, 1910, Eugene Ely took off from USS Birmingham in a Model D. This was the first time an aircraft had taken off from a ship. On January 18, 1911, Ely landed a Model D aboard USS Pennsylvania. This was the first aircraft to land on a ship.

Upon his election in November 1915, Congressman Orrin Dubbs Bleakley became the first government official to fly from his home state to Washington, DC. The trip was made in a 75 hp (56 kW) Curtiss biplane from Philadelphia, piloted by Sergeant William C. Ocker, on leave from the United States Aviation Corps at the time. The trip took 3 hours, 15 minutes, including an unscheduled stop in a wheat field in Maryland.

== Variants ==
Model D-4
with one 40 hp (30 kW) Curtiss four-cylinder inline engine

Model D-8
Signal Corps Number 2, one 40 hp (30 kW) Curtiss Vee engine, top speed of 60 mph (97 km/h) at sea level

Model D-8-75
with one 75 hp (56 kW) Curtiss eight-cylinder Vee engine

Burgess Model D
single prototype built under licence by Burgess Company of Marblehead, Massachusetts

== Operators ==
United States

- United States Army
  - Aeronautical Division, U.S. Signal Corps
    - S.C. No.2 (1911–1914)
- United States Navy

China

- Revolutionary Chinese
  - Chinese American Aerobatic Display Team

== Surviving aircraft ==
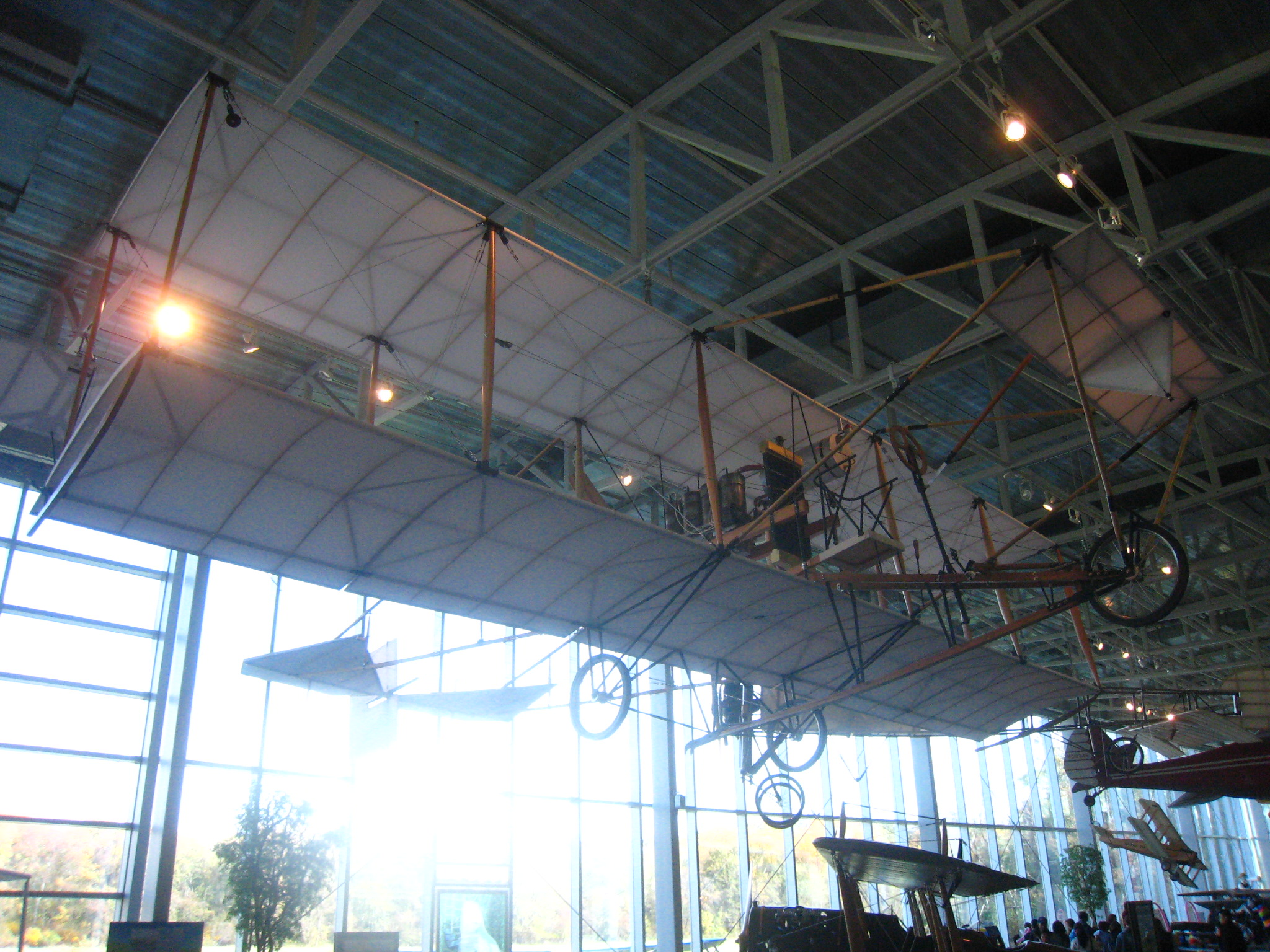
"Headed" Model D at the College Park Air Museum

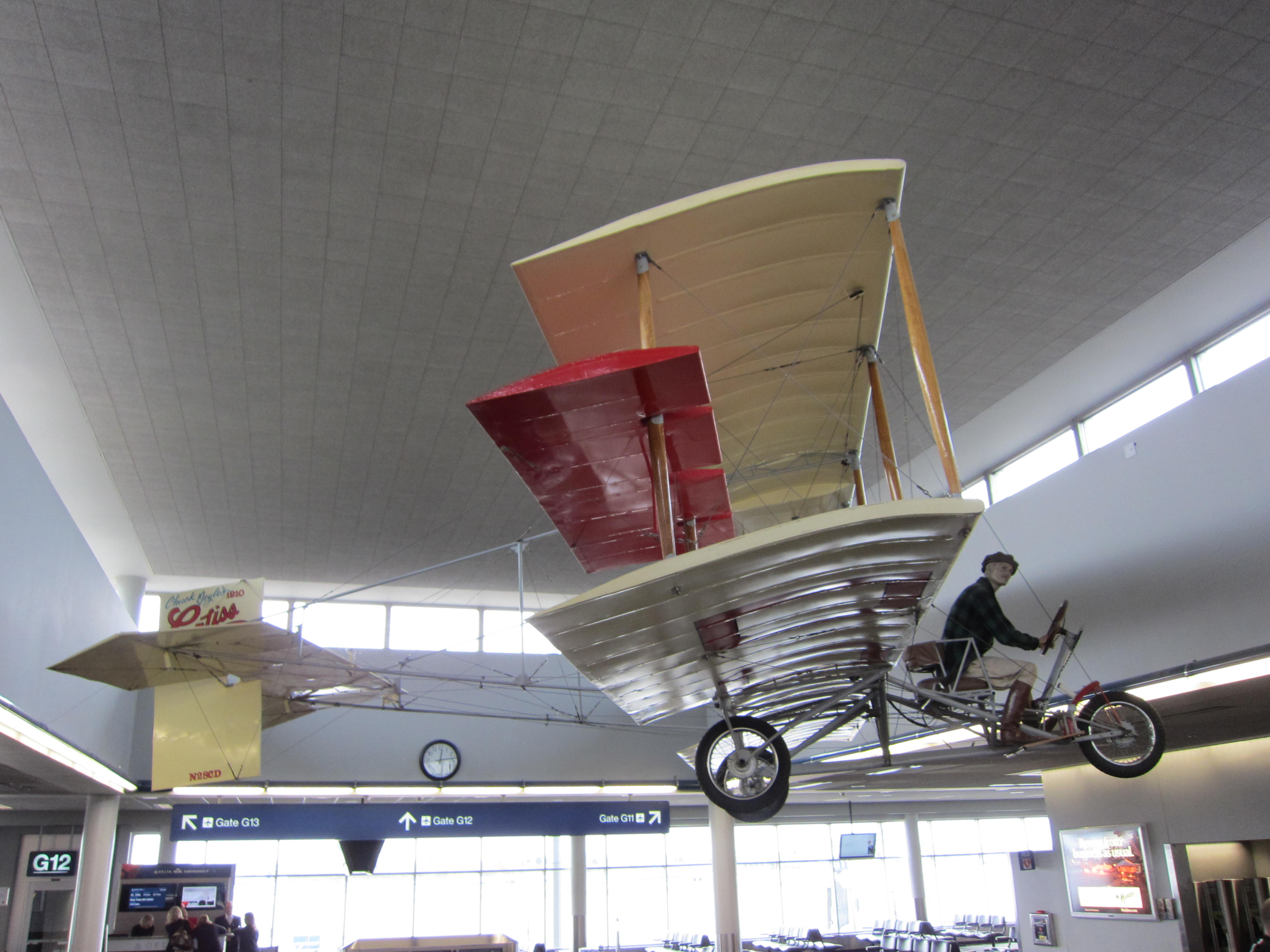
"Headless" Model D replica at Minneapolis-St. Paul International Airport

A number of Curtiss Pusher original and reproduction aircraft exist, and reproductions of the design date as far back to the era when the original aircraft was in production, mostly built by private parties.

- Original – this Model D is in storage with the Ohio History Connection in Columbus, Ohio. It was assembled by Paul and Josh Wilber in Norwalk, Ohio, from 1911-1912 and first flew on October 7, 1912. The original Roberts four-cylinder, two-cycle, 50-horsepower engine was replaced by a Kirkham six-cylinder, four-cycle, 50 hp engine. Approximately ninety percent of the aircraft is original.
- Replica – an airworthy Model D, it is at the Military Aviation Museum in Virginia Beach, Virginia.
- Replica –an airworthy Model D, at the Old Rhinebeck Aerodrome in Red Hook, New York, it was built for the collection in 1976, and has been powered by first a Hall-Scott V8 engine, and more recently, with a vintage Curtiss V8 engine.
- Replica – an airworthy Model D, at the Owls Head Maine Transportation Museum in Owls Head, Maine, it has a Continental O-300 engine installed.
- Unknown – an airworthy Model D, at the Western Antique Aeroplane & Automobile Museum in Hood River, Oregon, it has a Curtiss OX-5 engine installed. It was rebuilt in 1934, but includes parts dating back to 1910.
- Replica – a Model D on display at the Western Antique Aeroplane and Automobile Museum in Hood River, Oregon, it has a Continental C-85 engine installed.
- Replica – a Model D on static display at the National Air and Space Museum in Washington, DC, it was built in 1919 and includes parts from an original airframe. It initially had an OX-5 engine installed, but this was replaced by a Curtiss V8. It was donated to the Smithsonian in 1925.
- Replica – a Model D on static display at the Minneapolis-Saint Paul International Airport in Saint Paul, Minnesota, it was built in 1964 by John D Pruett and was previously owned by Chuck Doyle.
- Replica – a Model D on static display at the National Museum of the United States Air Force in Dayton, Ohio, it was completed in 1987 and has a replica engine made of wood and plastic.
- Replica – a Model D on static display at the College Park Aviation Museum in College Park, Maryland, it was completed in 2010.
- Replica – a Model D on static display at the Durango Silverton Narrow Gauge Railroad Museum in Durango, Colorado, it was built by Dave Claussen and installed in April 2013.
- Replica – a Model D on static display at the Nebraska National Guard Museum in Seward, Nebraska, it was built by Dave Claussen and installed in July 2016.
- Replica – a Model D on static display at the Reynolds-Alberta Museum in Wetaskiwin, Alberta, Canada, it incorporates an original Curtiss Pusher engine.
- Replica – a Model D on static display at Hector International Airport in Fargo, North Dakota, it was built, restored, and flown by Charles Klessig of Galesburg, North Dakota.

== Specifications (Model D Type IV) ==
Data from

General characteristics

- Crew: 1
- Capacity: 1 pax
- Length: 29 ft 3 in (8.92 m)
- Wingspan: 38 ft 3 in (11.66 m)
- Height: 7 ft 10 in (2.39 m)
- Empty weight: 700 lb (318 kg)
- Gross weight: 1,300 lb (590 kg)
- Powerplant: 1 × Curtiss E-4 4-cylinder water-cooled in-line piston engine, 40 hp (30 kW)
- Propellers: 2-bladed fixed-pitch pusher propeller

Performance

- Maximum speed: 50 mph (80 km/h, 43 kn)
- Endurance: 3 hours 30 minutes

== See also ==
Related development

- AEA June Bug
- Curtiss No. 1
- Curtiss Model E

Related lists

- List of United States Navy aircraft designations (pre-1962)
- List of military aircraft of the United States
- List of United States naval aircraft
- List of non-carrier aircraft flown from aircraft carriers
