= Curtiss V-8 motorcycle =

Curtiss V-8
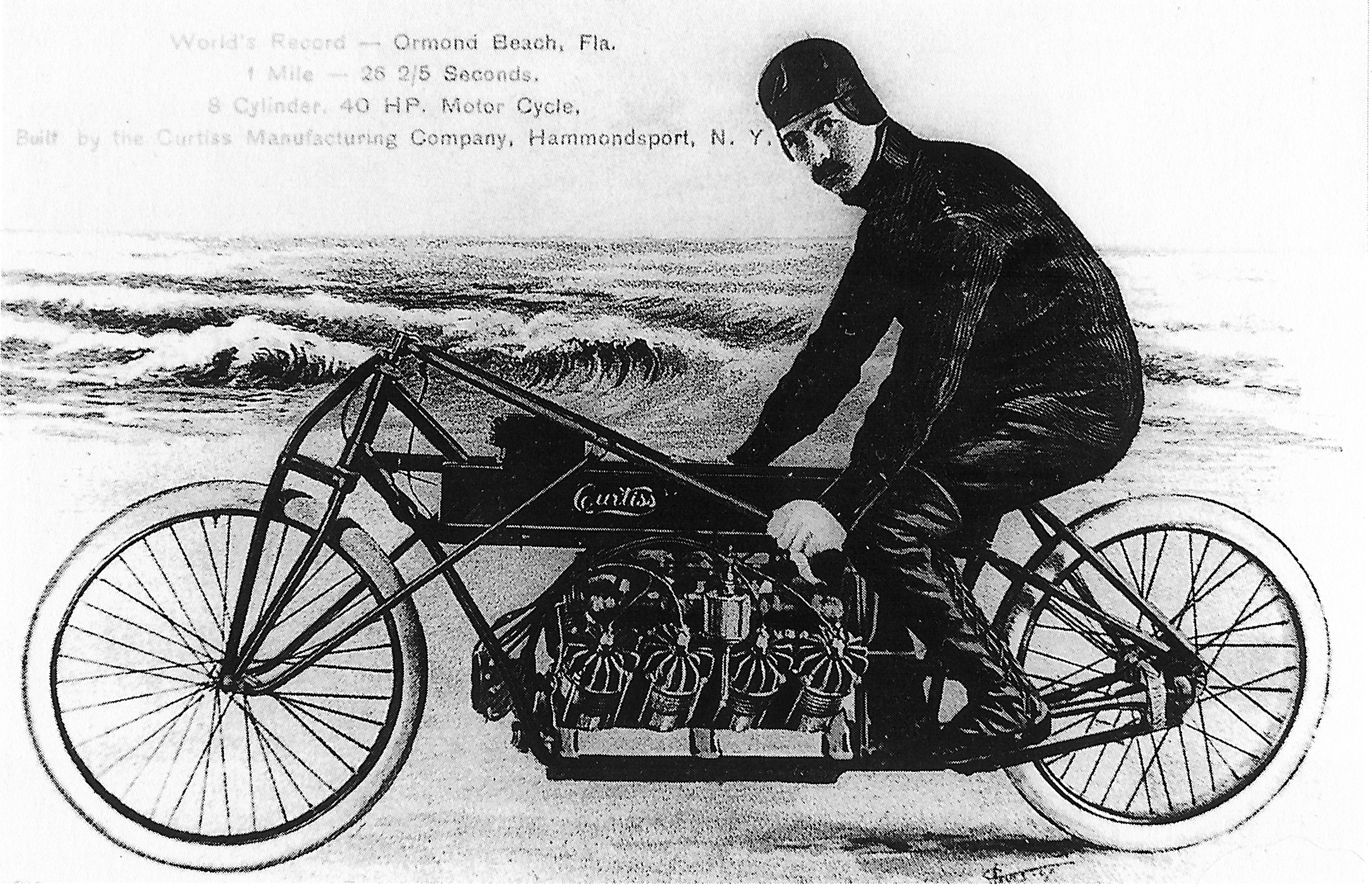
- Manufacturer: Glenn Curtiss
- Assembly: 1906
- Class: Speed record challenger
- Engine: Curtiss B-8: 269 cu in (4,410 cc), dual carburetor, 90° F-head V-8
- Bore / stroke: 3.625 in × 3.25 in (92.1 mm × 82.6 mm)
- Top speed: 136 mph (219 km/h)
- Power: 40 hp (30 kW) @ 1,800 RPM
- Ignition type: Battery ignition, jump-spark
- Transmission: Direct drive Shaft and rear hub bevel
- Frame type: Steel tubing
- Brakes: Rear v brake
- Tires: 26 in (660 mm)
- Wheelbase: 64 in (1.6 m)
- Dimensions: L: 7 ft 10 in (2.4 m); W: 2 ft 3 in (0.7 m); H: 3 ft (0.9 m)
- Weight: 275 lb (125 kg) (wet)
- Fuel capacity: 2.5 US gal (9.5 L)

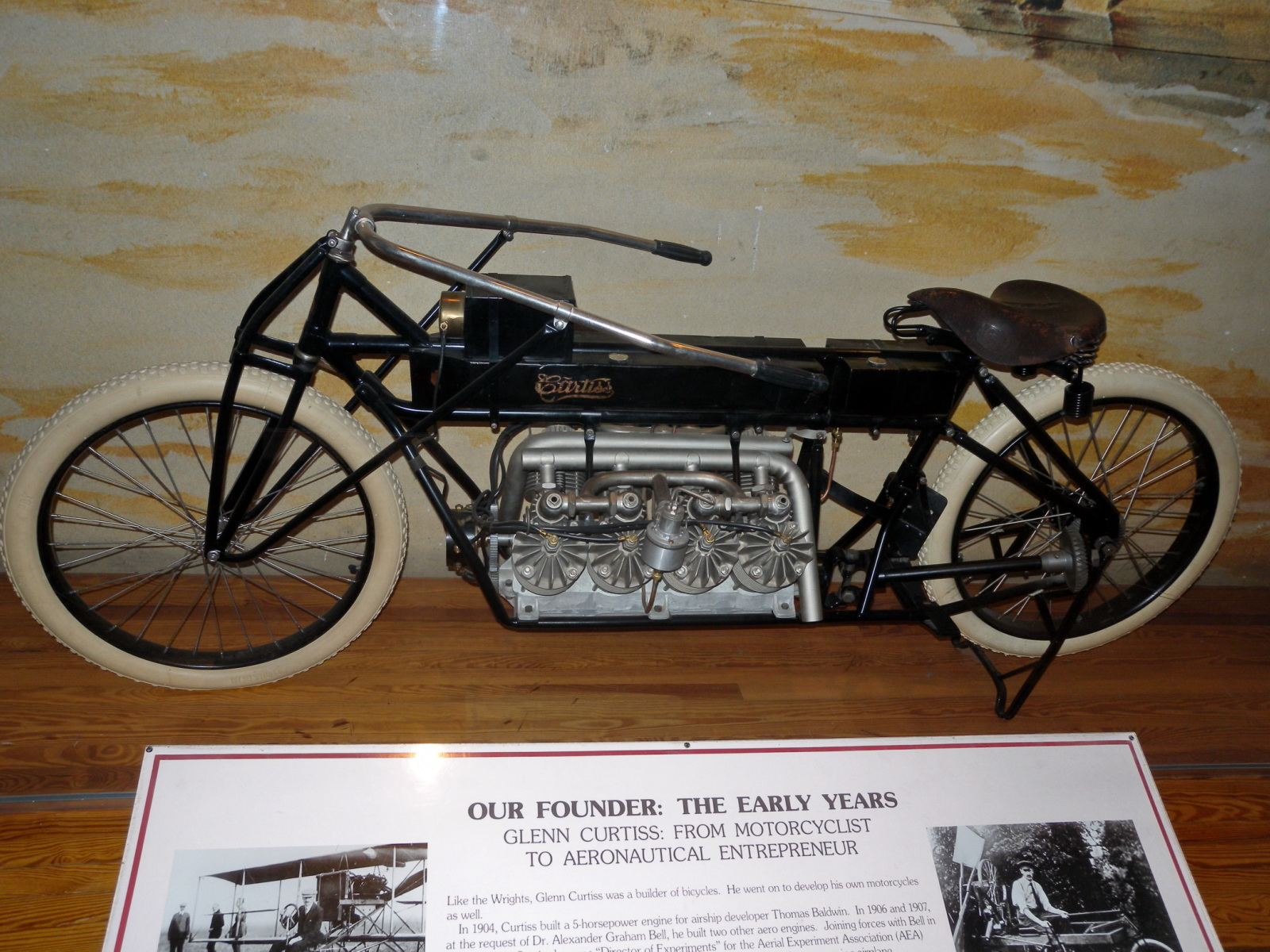
Curtiss V-8 in the Smithsonian

The Curtiss V-8 motorcycle was a purpose-built motorcycle designed and built by aviation and motorcycling pioneer Glenn Curtiss to show the power of his Curtiss Model B-8 269 cu in (4,410 cc) V8 engine intended for use in dirigible airships and upcoming airplanes.

Curtiss had already made a record run in 1903 with a V2 engine motorcycle. The V8 motorcycle set an unofficial land speed record of 136.36 miles per hour (219.45 km/h) on January 24, 1907 in Ormond Beach, Florida. This was only a one-way run, hand stopped with the use of binoculars. No return run was made as the direct drive shaft broke. The motorcycle, only able to run straight and not usable on roads, was retired.

In 2025, a working replica was made by Dale Stoner and presented by Jay Leno's Garage.

== Engine ==
The forty horsepower air-cooled F-head engine was the two carburetor version of the Curtiss Model B-8 aircraft powerplant, one of thirteen engines listed in the May 1908 "Aerial and Cycle Motors" catalog. The engine weighed 150 lb (68 kg) and was offered for US$1,200 but it did not sell, in spite of the engine's notoriety from the speed record. An eight carburetor version of the Model B-8 was used in the experimental AEA Red Wing and White Wing airplanes that flew in 1908.

== Legacy ==
Curtiss remained "the fastest man in the world," the title the newspapers gave him for going faster than any vehicle, on land, sea or air, until 1911, when his absolute record was broken by the 141.7 mph (228.0 km/h) Blitzen Benz automobile.

No motorcycle surpassed the record until 1930. Curtiss's success at racing strengthened his reputation as a leading maker of high-performance motorcycles and engines.

It has been suggested that the literary character Tom Swift was based on Curtiss. Tom Swift and His Motor Cycle, the first of over 100 books in the Tom Swift series, was published shortly after the V-8 record setting run.

The record setting V-8 motorcycle is now in the Smithsonian's National Air and Space Museum. The Air and Space museum lent it to the Guggenheim for the 1998 The Art of the Motorcycle exhibition in New York.

The Curtiss OX-5 aero engine, a successor of the V-8 motorcycle engine, powered several United States civilian and military aircraft. More than 10,000 were manufactured.

== See also ==
- Motorcycle land-speed record
- Land speed record
- List of motorcycles of 1900 to 1909
