= Bell Oionus I =

1910 aircraft

Oionus I
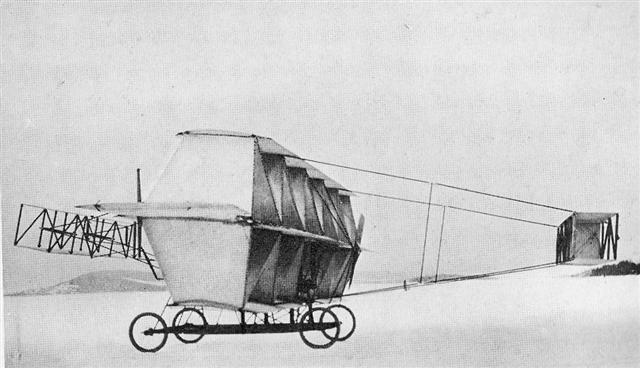
- The Oionus I at Baddeck, Nova Scotia in 1910

General information
- Type: Early experimental aircraft
- Manufacturer: Bell Experimental Labroratory
- Designer: Alexander Graham Bell
- Number built: 1

History
- Manufactured: 1910
- First flight: 25 March 1910

The Oionus I was a tetrahedral triplane built for Alexander Graham Bell. It was the culmination of Bell's experiments with kites built at Baddeck, Nova Scotia. The aircraft's design combined those of the Aerial Experiment Association (AEA)'s AEA Silver Dart biplane and his AEA Cygnet kite. It was Bell's final aviation pursuit and Canada's first and only triplane design. The aircraft attempted a test flight in March 1910 but failed to achieve flight.

== Design and development ==
The Oionus I had its origins in March 1909 with the dissolution of the AEA, when Alexander Graham Bell hired both Frederick W. "Casey" Baldwin as an engineer and J.A.D. McCurdy as assistant engineer to build the last of Bell's designs. Incorporating tetrahedral sections in the structure of the triplane design continued the concept of the tetrahedral kites that had originally been tested in Bell's AEA Cygnet series that had achieved a short hop in the Cygnet III but were abandoned as a concept by Bell.

The triplane design that was chosen employed a longer central plane with wingtip ailerons, with flying controls based on a fixed biplane tail and rudder at the rear and a canard biplane elevator section at the front. The internal structure was based on tubular-steel with linen-covered wings and interior sections; a four-wheel chassis or running gear formed the undercarriage. A Curtiss pusher engine drove a propeller through a chain and sprocket arrangement; later a Kirkham engine from the Baddeck No. 2 was substituted.

== Operational history ==
After construction was complete in February 1910, and a new engine was installed, McCurdy readied the aircraft for flight, taking it out on some ground runs. Ballast was added to the tail and on 25 March 1910, a fight test off the ice at Baddeck Bay managed to achieve three of the four wheels coming off the ground. McCurdy ended the test in order for modification to be made for future testing, including adding more incidence to the wings. Shortly after, the ice melted and no further attempts were made to fly the Oionus I.

== Specifications (Oionos I) ==
Data from Canadian Aircraft Since 1909

General characteristics

- Crew: 1
- Empty weight: 700 lb (318 kg)
- Powerplant: 1 × Kirkham 40 hp air-cooled piston engine, 40 hp (30 kW)

Performance
