= Thomas Selfridge =

First person to die in an airplane crash (1908)

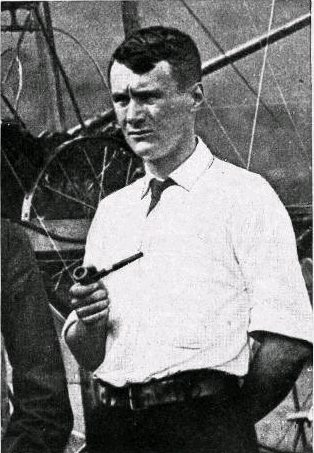
- Lieutenant Thomas Selfridge (1882–1908)
- Born: February 8, 1882; San Francisco, California, U.S.
- Died: September 17, 1908 (aged 26); Fort Myer, Virginia, U.S.
- Cause of death: Plane crash
- Burial place: Arlington National Cemetery Section 3 Gravesite 2158
- Relatives: Thomas O. Selfridge Sr. (grandfather), Thomas O. Selfridge Jr. (uncle)
- Military career
- Allegiance: United States
- Branch: United States Army
- Service years: 1903–1908
- Rank: First Lieutenant
- Units: Aeronautical Division, U.S. Signal Corps

Thomas Etholen Selfridge (February 8, 1882 – September 17, 1908) was an American first lieutenant in the U.S. Army and the first person to die in an airplane crash. He was also the first active-duty member of the U.S. military to die in a crash while on duty. He was killed while seated as a passenger in a Wright Flyer, on a demonstration flight piloted by Orville Wright.

== Biography ==
Selfridge was born on February 8, 1882, in San Francisco, California. He was the nephew of Rear Admiral Thomas Oliver Selfridge Jr., who was the son of another Rear Admiral, Thomas Oliver Selfridge Sr. He graduated from the United States Military Academy in 1903, and received his commission in the Artillery Corps. He was 31st in a class of 96; Douglas MacArthur was first. In 1907, when the Artillery Corps was separated into the Field Artillery and Coast Artillery Corps, Selfridge was assigned to the 5th Field Artillery Regiment and the following year to the 1st Field Artillery Regiment.

Selfridge was stationed at the Presidio during the great San Francisco earthquake of April 18, 1906. His unit participated in search and rescue, as well as cleanup operations. In 1907, he was assigned to the Aeronautical Division, U.S. Signal Corps at Fort Myer, Virginia, where he was later instructed in flying a dirigible. He was also the United States government representative to the Aerial Experiment Association (AEA), which was chaired by Alexander Graham Bell, and he became its first secretary.

Selfridge took his first flight on December 6, 1907, on Bell's tetrahedral kite, the Cygnet, made of 3,393 winged cells. It took him 168 feet (51 m) in the air above Bras d'Or Lake in Nova Scotia, Canada, and flew for 7 minutes. This was the first recorded passenger flight of any heavier-than-air craft in Canada. He also flew a craft built by a Canadian engineer, Frederick W. Baldwin, which flew 3 feet (0.91 m) off the ground for a distance of about 100 feet (30 m).

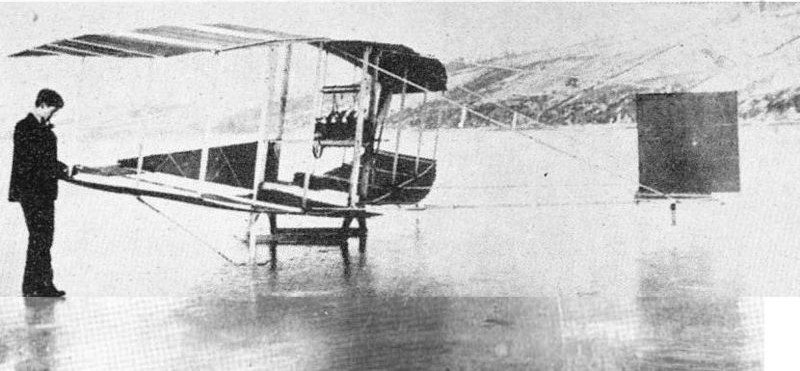
"Red Wing" aeroplane

Selfridge designed Red Wing, the AEA's first powered aircraft. On March 12, 1908, the Red Wing, piloted by Frederick W. Baldwin, raced over the frozen surface of Keuka Lake near Hammondsport, New York, on runners, and managed to fly 318 feet (97 m) before crashing. Red Wing was destroyed in a crash on its second flight on March 17, 1908, and only the engine could be salvaged.

On May 19, 1908, Selfridge became the first US military officer to pilot a modern aircraft, when he flew solo in AEA's newest craft, White Wing, traveling 100 feet (30 m) on his first attempt and 200 feet (61 m) on his second. Between May 19 and August 3, he made several flights at Hammondsport, culminating in a flight of 1 minute and 30 seconds at a height of 75 feet (23 m). The next day, his final solo flight of 50 seconds covered a distance of 800 yards (730 m). Although not fully trained as a pilot, Selfridge was nevertheless the first U.S. military officer to fly any airplane unaccompanied.

In August 1908, Selfridge was one of three pilots trained to fly the Army Dirigible Number One, purchased by the US Army from Thomas Scott Baldwin in July 1908; his training partners were Lieutenants Frank P. Lahm and Benjamin Foulois. The dirigible was scheduled to fly from Fort Omaha, Nebraska, to exhibitions at the Missouri State Fair in Sedalia, Missouri, piloted by Foulois and Selfridge.The Army had tentatively agreed, however, to purchase an airplane from the Wright brothers and had scheduled the acceptance trials in September. Selfridge, with an interest in both heavier-than-air and lighter-than-air ships, obtained an appointment and traveled to Fort Myer, Virginia.

== Death ==
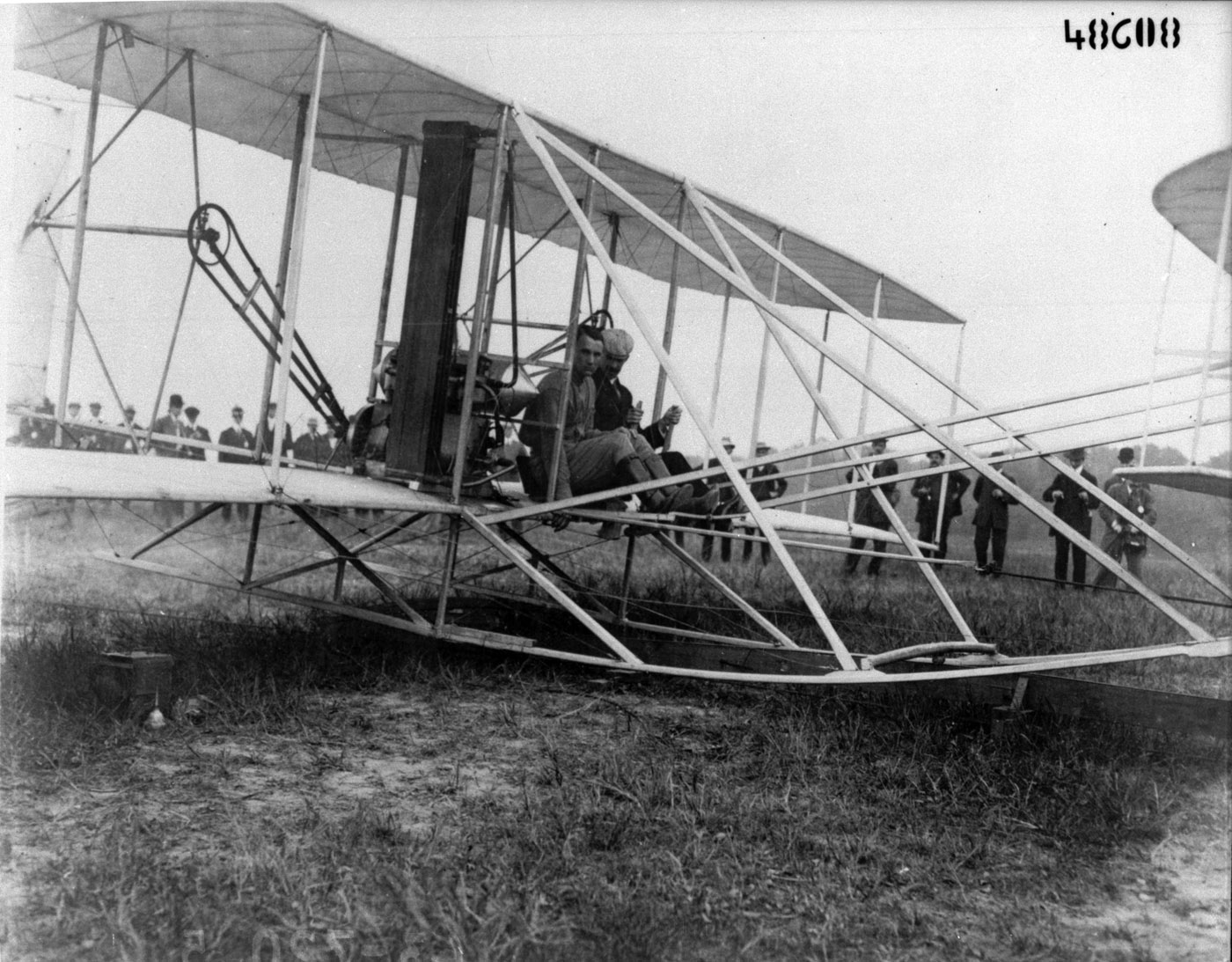
Selfridge and Orville Wright prior to takeoff on the fatal flight

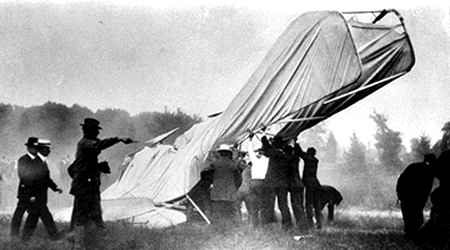
Wreckage of the Wright Flyer that took the life of Tom Selfridge

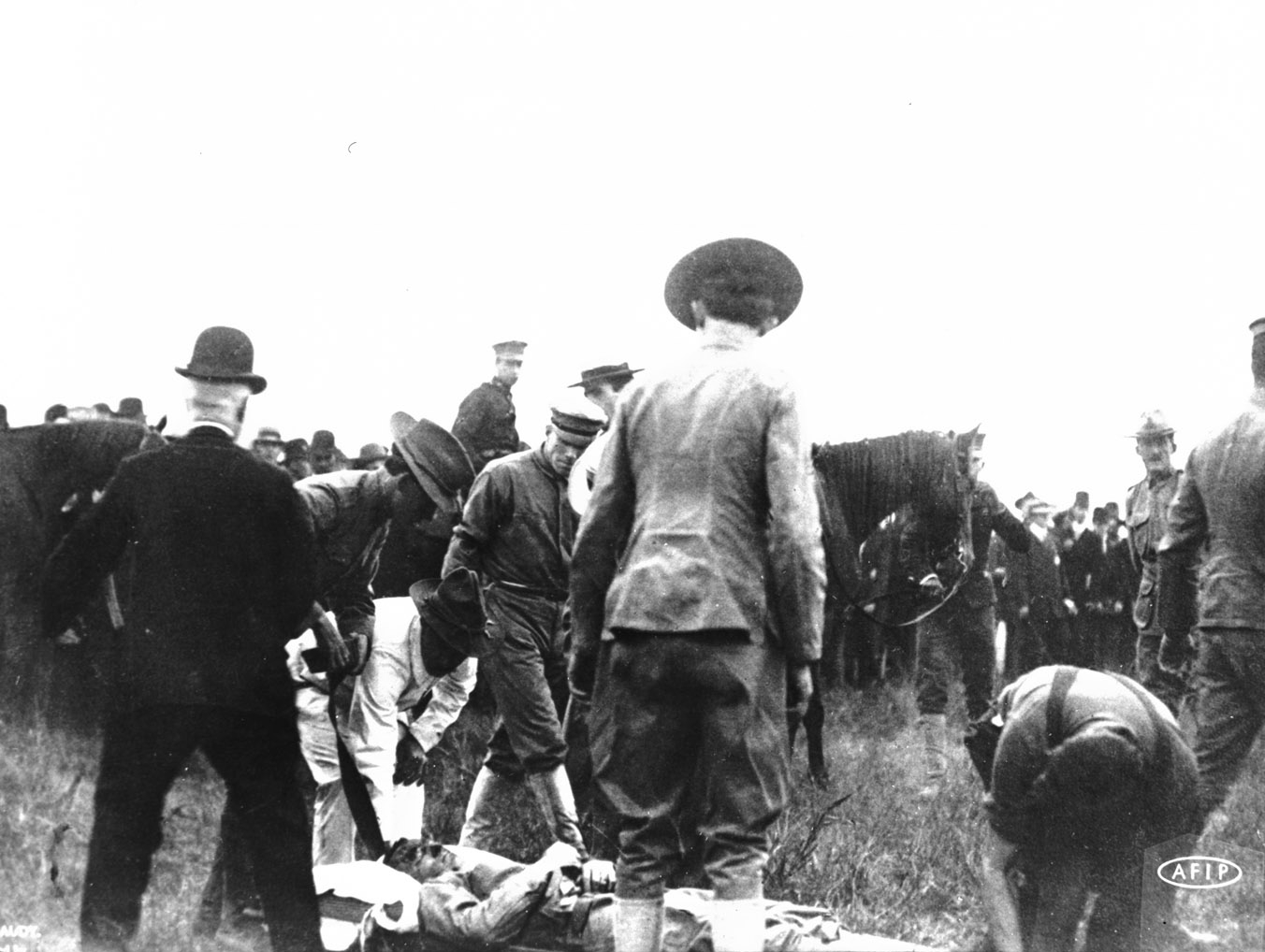
Army personnel tending to Thomas Selfridge on stretcher

In September 1908, Orville Wright visited Fort Myer to demonstrate the 1908 Wright Military Flyer for the US Army Signal Corps division. On September 17, Selfridge arranged to be his passenger, and Wright piloted the craft. On this occasion, the Flyer was carrying more weight than it had ever done before; the combined weight of the two men was about 320 pounds (150 kg).

The Flyer circled Fort Myer 4 1/2 times at a height of 150 feet (46 m). Halfway through the fifth circuit, at 5:14 in the afternoon, the right-hand propeller broke, losing thrust. This set up a vibration, causing the split propeller to hit a guy-wire bracing the rear vertical rudder. The wire tore out of its fastening and shattered the propeller; the rudder swiveled to the horizontal and sent the Flyer into a nose dive. Wright shut off the engine and managed to glide to about 75 feet (23 m), but the craft hit the ground nose-first. Both men were thrown forward against the remaining wires, and Selfridge struck one of the wooden uprights of the framework, fracturing the base of his skull. He underwent neurosurgery, but died three hours later without regaining consciousness. Wright suffered severe injuries, including a broken left femur, several broken ribs, and a damaged hip, and was hospitalized for seven weeks.

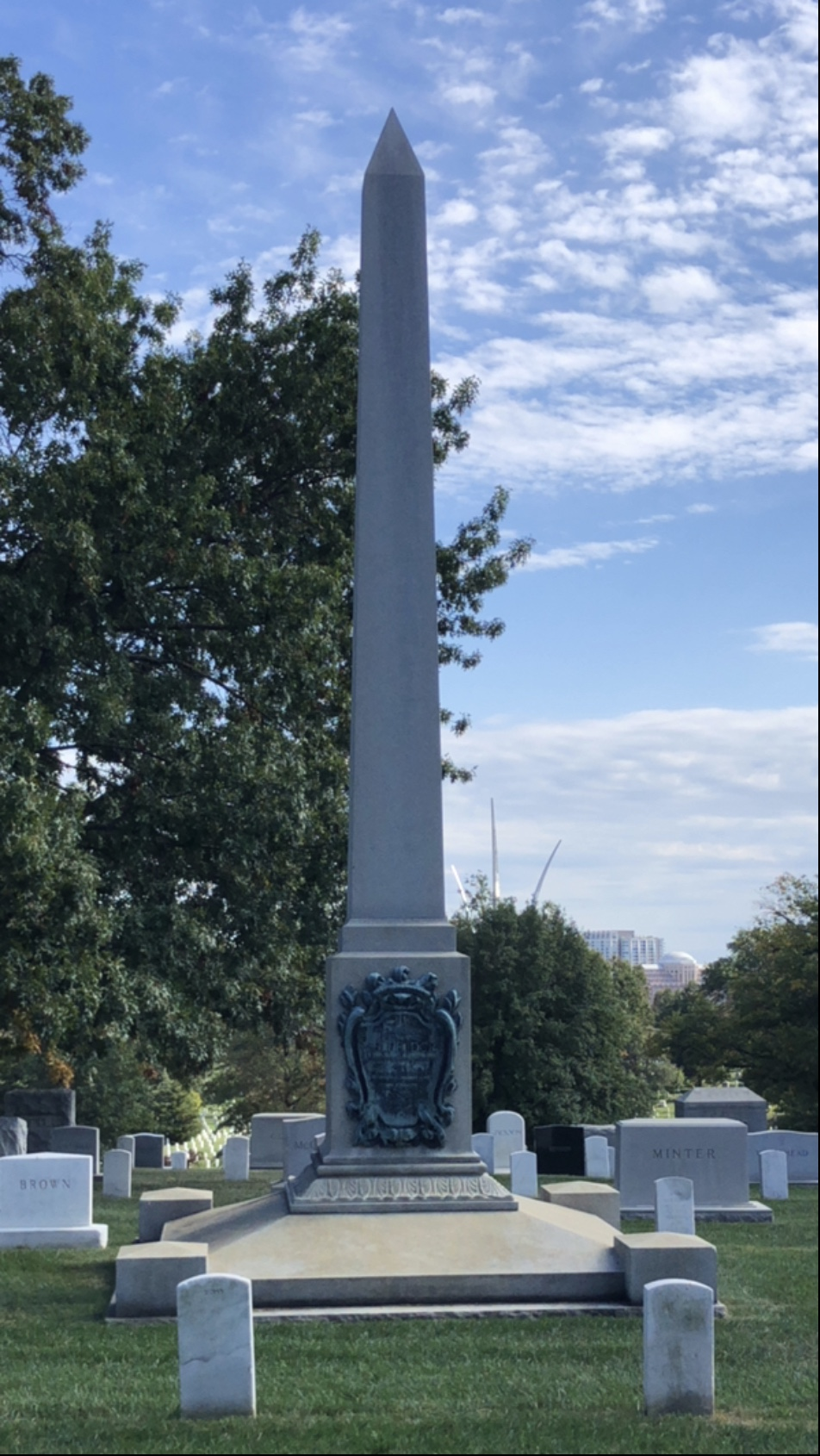
Thomas Selfridge gravestone at Arlington National Cemetery

Orville Wright later described the fatal accident in a letter to his brother, Wilbur Wright:

On the fourth round, everything seemingly working much better and smoother than any former flight, I started on a larger circuit with less abrupt turns. It was on the very first slow turn that the trouble began. ... A hurried glance behind revealed nothing wrong, but I decided to shut off the power and descend as soon as the machine could be faced in a direction where a landing could be made. This decision was hardly reached, in fact, I suppose it was not over two or three seconds from the time the first taps were heard, until two big thumps, which gave the machine a terrible shaking, showed that something had broken. ... The machine suddenly turned to the right and I immediately shut off the power. Quick as a flash, the machine turned down in front and started straight for the ground. Our course for 50 feet was within a very few degrees of the perpendicular. Lt. Selfridge up to this time had not uttered a word, though he took a hasty glance behind when the propeller broke and turned once or twice to look into my face, evidently to see what I thought of the situation. But when the machine turned head first for the ground, he exclaimed 'Oh! Oh!' in an almost inaudible voice.

Two photographs taken of the Flyer just prior to the flight show that Selfridge was not wearing any headgear, while Wright was only wearing a cap. Following the crash, due to speculation that Selfridge would have survived had he worn headgear, the first pilots of the US Army were instructed to wear large heavy headgear reminiscent of early football helmets.

Thomas Selfridge was buried in Arlington National Cemetery in Section 3 Gravesite 2158, adjacent to Joint Base Myer-Henderson Hall.

== Legacy ==
Selfridge Air National Guard Base is named after him. The base is located in Harrison Township, Michigan, near Mt. Clemens, 22 miles from downtown Detroit, Michigan (from the US Port of Entry at the Detroit-Windsor Tunnel).

Though buried in Arlington National Cemetery, Selfridge is memorialized by a large cenotaph in Section XXXIV of West Point Cemetery.

The damaged propeller of the Wright Flyer wrecked at Fort Myer can be viewed at the National Museum of the United States Air Force, at Wright-Patterson Air Force Base, in Dayton, Ohio.

In 1965, Selfridge was posthumously inducted into the National Aviation Hall of Fame in Dayton, Ohio.

A gate between Arlington National Cemetery and Joint Base Myer-Henderson Hall, located roughly halfway between the two chapels on Joint Base Myer-Henderson Hall, is named Selfridge Gate, in his honor.

== See also ==
- List of fatalities from aviation accidents
- List of firsts in aviation
- Otto Lilienthal, glider death
- Percy Pilcher, glider crash
- Daniel J. Maloney, glider death
- George E. M. Kelly, first American military pilot to die in an airplane crash while piloting
- Eugene Lefebvre, first pilot to be killed
