= Curtiss B-8 =

1900s American piston aircraft engine

B-8
- Type: V-8 air-cooled
- National origin: United States
- Manufacturer: Glenn Curtiss
- Major applications: AEA June Bug

The Curtiss B-8 was an early air-cooled 8-cylinder engine used for a number of aircraft and one motorcycle designed by Glenn Curtiss. Made in 1906, the Curtiss V-8 motorcycle set a speed record in January 1907. The engine type powered the AEA June Bug on 4 July 1908, becoming the first Curtiss engine to power a heavier-than-air aircraft in sustained flight.

According to Dale Stoner, who had built a replica of the V-8 motorcycle, it ran with 1675 rpm at 136 mph. He added a 1:3 transmission to slow the replica down.

A comparable, earlier French design is the Antoinette 8V that since 1904 powered several boats and aircraft.

Applications included:

- AEA June Bug
- AEA White Wing
- AEA Red Wing
- Curtiss V-8 motorcycle
- Greene 1910 Biplane

== Specifications ==
Data from

=== General characteristics ===
- Type: V-8 Air-cooled piston engine
- Bore: 3.625 in (92 mm)
- Stroke: 3.25 in (83 mm)
- Displacement: 268 cu in (4,391.7 cc)
- Length: 31 in (79 cm)
- Width: 17 in (43 cm)
- Height: 19.5 in (50 cm)
- Dry weight: 150 lb (68.04 kg)
- Designer: Glenn Curtiss

=== Performance ===
- Power output: 40 hp (29.8 kW)
- Power-to-weight ratio: 0.27 hp/lb (0.438 kW/kg)
