= AEA June Bug =

American biplane

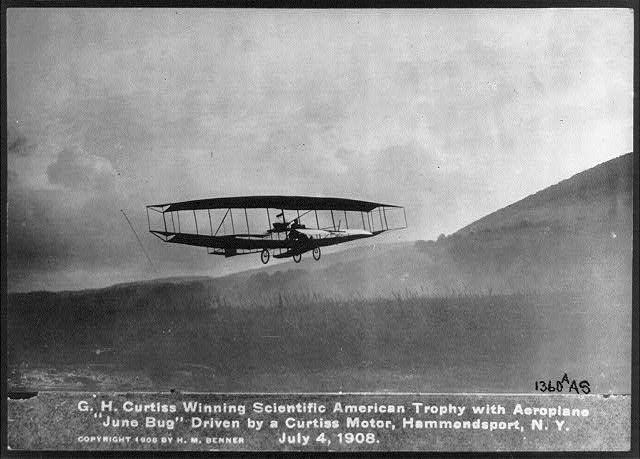

General information
- Type: Pioneer era aircraft
- Manufacturer: Aerial Experiment Association
- Designer: Glenn Curtiss
- Status: Crashed January 2, 1909
- Primary user: Aerial Experiment Association
- Number built: 1

History
- Manufactured: 1908
- First flight: June 21, 1908

The June Bug was an American "pioneer era" biplane built by the Aerial Experiment Association (A.E.A) in 1908 and flown by Glenn Hammond Curtiss. The aircraft was the first American airplane to fly at least 1 km in front of a crowd.

== Design and development ==
A Scientific American competition in 1907 offered a solid silver sculpted trophy, and $25,000 in cash, to be awarded to whoever made the first public flight of over 1 kilometer (3,280 ft) in an American aircraft. In 1907, Glenn Curtiss and the Aerial Experiment Association began building the June Bug with hopes of winning the Scientific American Cup.

The June Bug, also referred to as Aerodrome #3 (the third powered airplane built by the A.E.A), included the previously used aileron steering system, but a shoulder yoke made it possible for the pilot to steer by leaning from side to side. The aircraft featured a canard, horizontal surfaces, and a rear rudder. The original varnish sealing the wing fabric cracked in the heat, so a mixture of turpentine, paraffin, and gasoline was used on the aircraft instead. The June Bug had yellow wings due to the yellow ochre added to the wing mixture in order to make the aircraft show up better in the orthochromic-form monochrome photographs of the time.

The aircraft was named by Alexander Graham Bell after the common Phyllophaga, a beetle known colloquially in North America as the "June bug". This was because June bugs were observed to fly similarly to aircraft: they have large stiff outer wings for gliding, and more delicate smaller propeller-like wings that do the actual propulsion.

The June Bug was tested by G.H. Curtiss in Hammondsport, New York, at Stony Brook Farm, on June 21, 1908. Three of the four test flights were successful, with distances of 456 ft (139 m), 417 ft (127 m), and 1,266 ft (386 m), at an average speed of 34.5 mph (55.5 km/h). On June 25, performances of 2,175 ft (663 m) and 3,420 ft (1,040 m) were considered encouraging, and the A.E.A. contacted the Aero Club of America to sign up for the Scientific American Cup.

== Operational history ==
=== Cup attempt ===
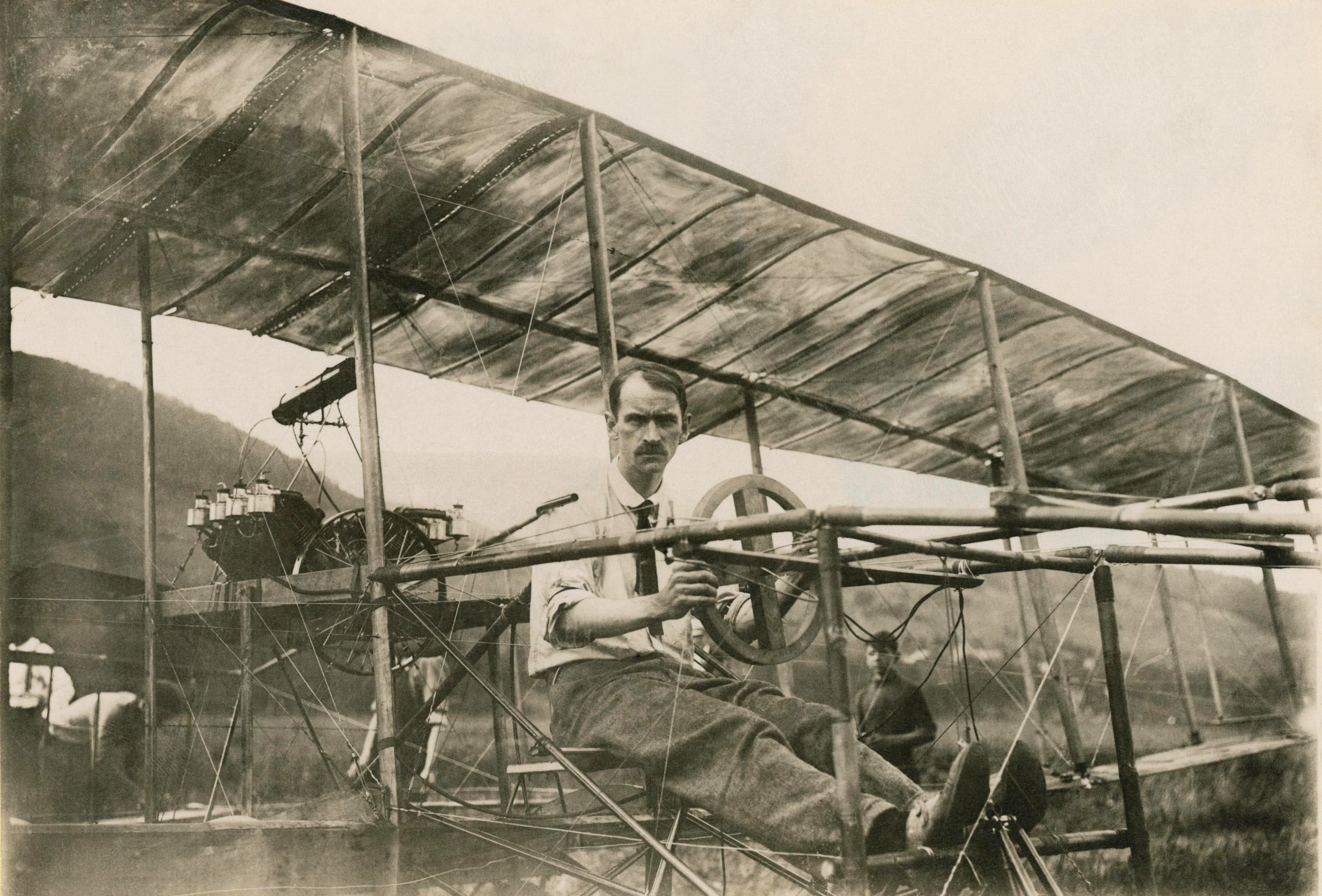
Curtiss in the June Bug, July 4, 1908.

The Aero Club contacted the Wright brothers, offering them the chance to make an attempt first. Orville wrote to decline the opportunity on June 30, as the Wrights were busy completing their deal with the United States government. Orville's message was received by July 1, and G.H. Curtiss took to the air as requested on July 4 (Independence Day).

The flight was made a public event, and spectators were allowed to watch. The event was overseen by a delegation of 22 members of the Aero Club, headed by Alan R. Hawley. The Kalem Company's film crew covered the event, making the June Bug the first airplane in the United States to perform in a movie. The nearby Pleasant Valley Wine Company opened its doors and offered free samples to the spectators at the event. Charles M. Manly, who had unsuccessfully tested the Langley Aerodrome in 1903, measured out the 1 km and 20 ft (6.1 m) distance with volunteer help. The June Bug took one false start, going 40 feet (12 m) high, but not far enough. On the second try, the airplane successfully flew 5,085 ft (1550 m) in 1 minute 42 seconds, winning the trophy and a US$25,000 cash prize.

Amidst the publicity following the flight, the Wrights sent a warning to Curtiss that they had not given permission for the use of "their" aircraft control system to be used "for exhibitions or in a commercial way". In fact, none of the A.E.A.'s aircraft used a wing-warping system like the Wrights' for control, relying instead on triangular ailerons designed by Alexander Graham Bell, which he successfully patented in December 1911. However, in 1913 a court ruled that this technique was an infringement of the Wright's 1906 patent.

Three years previous to the June Bug's flight, the Wrights had made flights of up to 24 miles (38 km) without official witnesses. However, the Wrights would have been required to install wheels and dispense with a catapult launch to compete for the 1908 prize.

== Later use ==
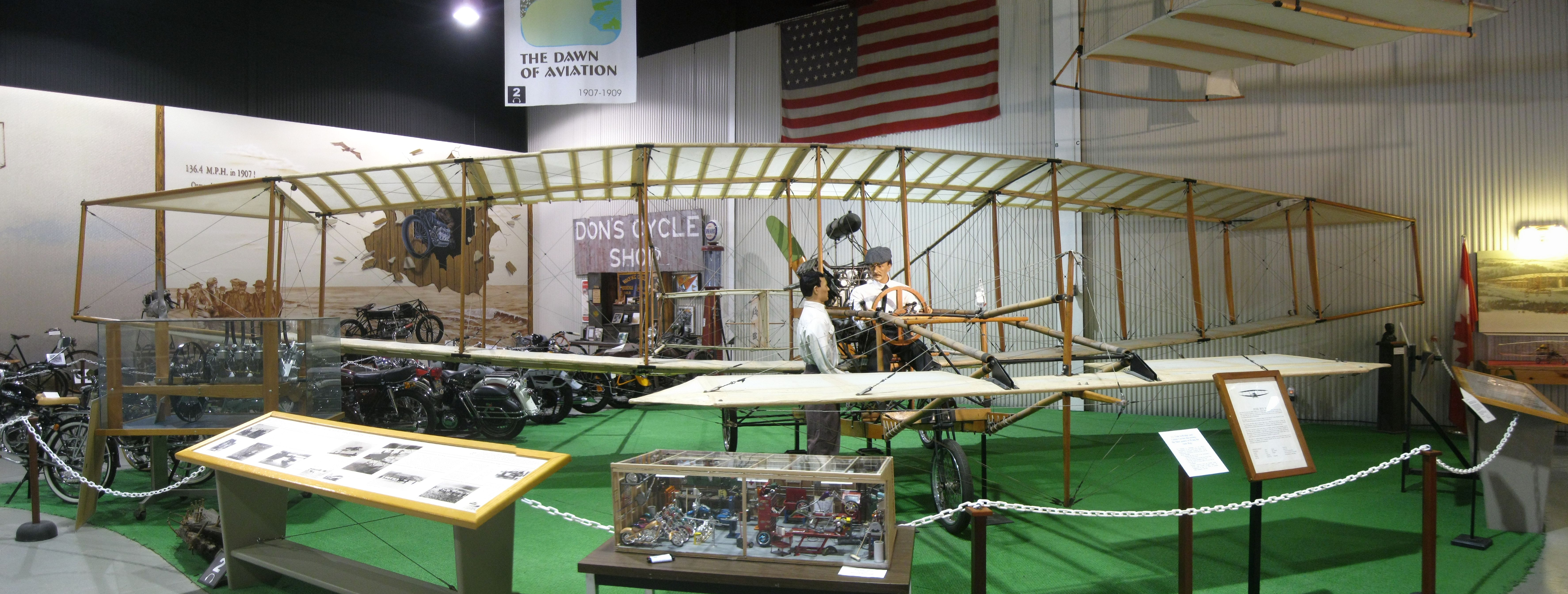
Modern operational replica of the June Bug in the Glenn H. Curtiss Museum in Hammondsport, New York

From October to November, the June Bug was modified by adding floats to it in an attempt to create a seaplane. Renamed Loon, attempts to fly it began on Keuka Lake on November 28. Although the aircraft could achieve speeds of up to 29 mph (47 km/h) on the water, it could not take off, and on January 2, 1909, one of the floats filled with water, causing the Loon to sink. It was recovered, but rotted in a nearby boathouse.

A replica of the June Bug was built and flown in 1976 by Mercury Aircraft of Hammondsport.

== Specifications ==
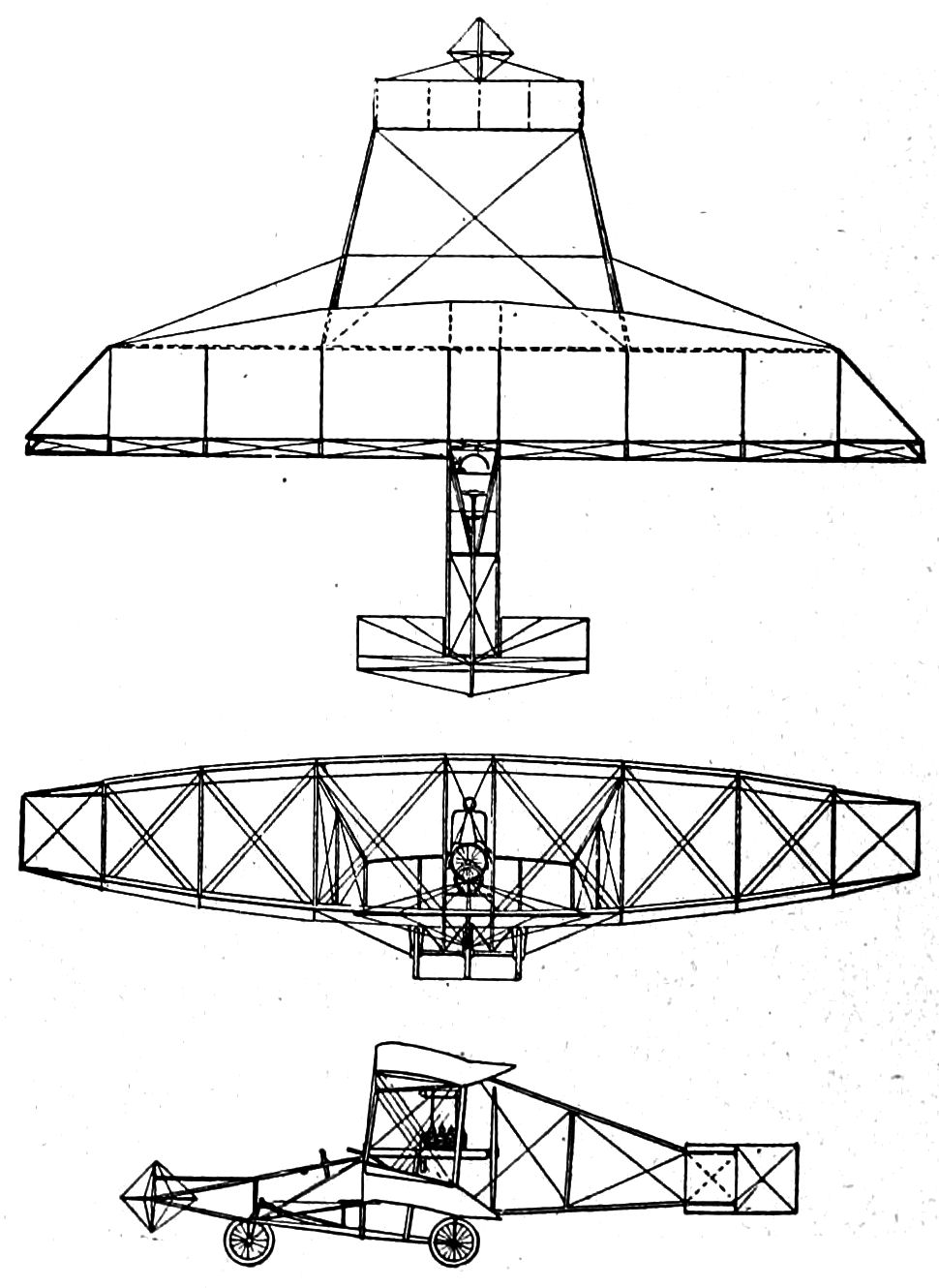
Curtiss June Bug 3-view drawing from Aero Digest, December 1928

Data from

General characteristics

- Length: 27 ft 5 in (8.36 m)
- Wingspan: 42 ft 6 in (12.95 m)
- Powerplant: 1 × Curtiss B-8 V-8 air-cooled piston engine, 40 hp (30 kW)

Performance

- Maximum speed: 39 mph (63 km/h, 34 kn)5,360ft

== See also ==
Related development

- Curtiss Golden Flyer
