= AEA Red Wing =

Aircraft designed by Thomas Selfridge in 1908

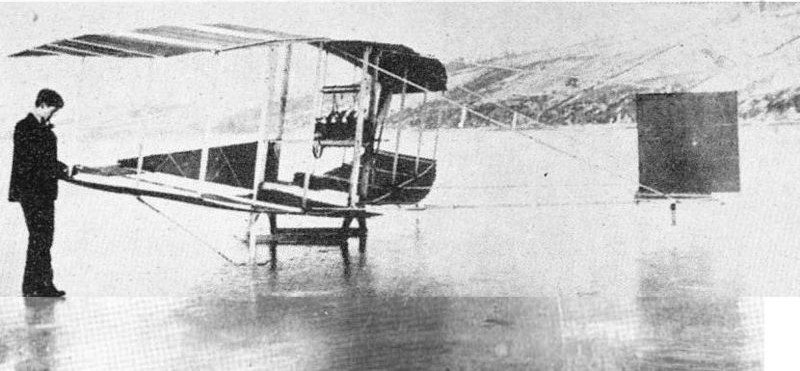

General information
- Type: Early experimental aircraft
- Manufacturer: Aerial Experiment Association
- Designer: Thomas Selfridge
- Status: Destroyed on second flight
- Primary user: Aerial Experiment Association

History
- First flight: 12 March 1908

The Red Wing (or Aerodrome #1) was an early aircraft designed by Thomas Selfridge and built by the Aerial Experiment Association in 1908. It was named for the bright red color of its silk wings — chosen to achieve the best result with the photographic materials and techniques of the day.

The aircraft was a pusher configuration with the engine and propeller behind the pilot. Lateral control was provided by the pilot shifting his weight from side to side.

On 12 March 1908 Frederick W. Baldwin piloted the aircraft off the frozen Keuka Lake near Hammondsport, New York in what would be the first public demonstration of a powered aircraft flight in the United States as well as the first flight by a Canadian pilot.

Contemporary accounts described the flight as the "First Public Trip of Heavier-than-air Car in America." Reports entitled "Views of an Expert" stated that Professor Alexander Graham Bell's new machine, the Red Wing, built from plans by Lieutenant Selfridge, was "shown to be practicable by flight over Keuka Lake, Hammondsport, New York, 12 March 1908 by F. W. Baldwin, the engineer in charge of its construction."

The aircraft covered 319 ft (97 m) at a height of around 20 ft (6 m). This was said to be the longest "first flight" by either an aircraft or a pilot, up to that date. On March 17 Baldwin attempted a second flight, also from the ice of Keuka Lake, before crashing 20 seconds after takeoff. A portion of the tail gave way, bringing the test to an end. The Red Wing was damaged beyond repair.

== Specifications (Red Wing) ==
General characteristics

- Crew: 1
- Length: 26 ft 0 in (8.0 m)
- Wingspan: 43 ft 4 in (13.21 m)
- Powerplant: 1 × Curtiss B-8 air-cooled V8 engine, 40 hp (30 kW)

Performance

- Range: 0.060 mi (0.097 km, 0.052 nmi)

== See also ==
Related lists

- List of experimental aircraft
