= Aerial Experiment Association =

1907–1909 aircraft research group

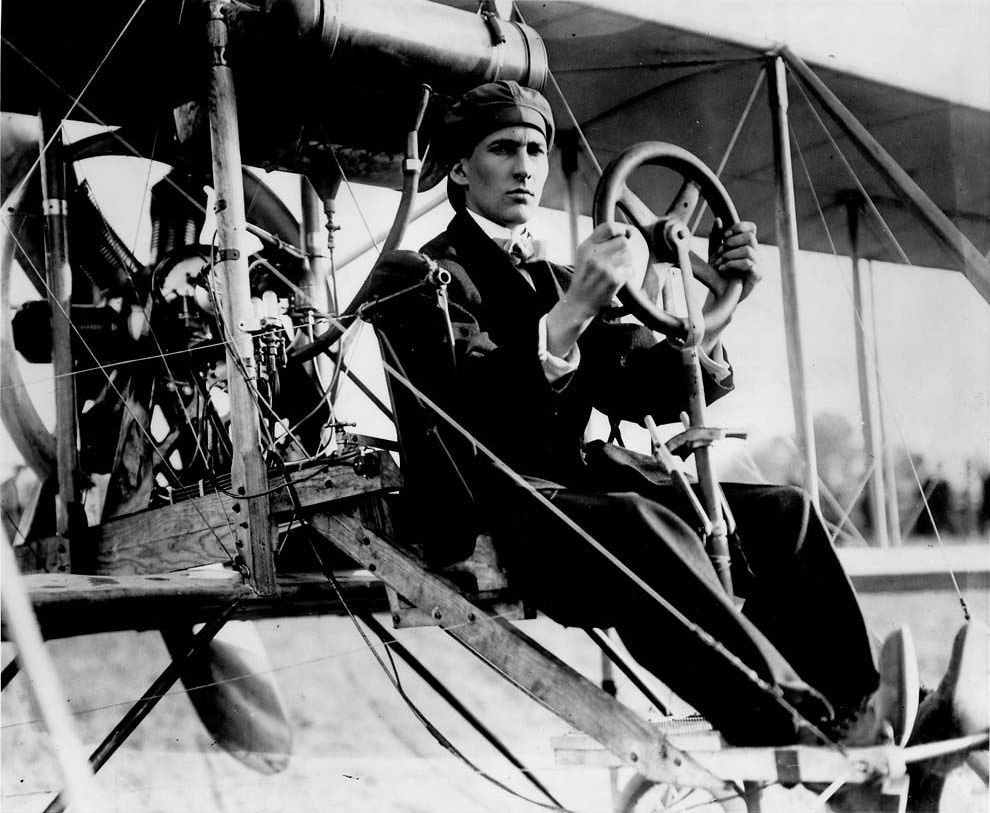
AEA member John Alexander Douglas McCurdy at the controls of an airplane during an aviation 'meet' near Toronto, Ontario, Canada, c. August 1911. The starboard-side of the transverse "shoulder-yoke" hinged structure for aileron control, in the general form of an upper seat support frame, is visible beside the seated pilot.

The Aerial Experiment Association (AEA) was a Canadian-American aeronautical research group formed on 30 September 1907, under the leadership of Dr. Alexander Graham Bell.

The AEA produced several different aircraft in quick succession, with each member acting as principal designer for at least one. The group introduced key technical innovations, notably wingtip ailerons and the tricycle landing gear.

According to Bell, the AEA was a "co-operative scientific association, not for gain but for the love of the art and doing what we can to help one another." Although the association had no significant commercial impact, one of its members, Glenn Curtiss, later established a commercial venture that would ultimately become the Curtiss Aeroplane and Motor Company. The AEA was disbanded on 31 March 1909.

== Origins ==
The AEA came into being when John Alexander Douglas McCurdy and his friend Frederick W. "Casey" Baldwin, two recent engineering graduates of the University of Toronto, decided to spend the summer in Baddeck, Nova Scotia. McCurdy had grown up there, and his father was the personal secretary of Bell. He had grown up close to the Bell family and was well received in their home. One day, as the three sat with Bell discussing the problems of aviation, Mabel Bell, Alexander's wife, suggested they create a formal research group to exploit their collective ideas. Being independently wealthy, she provided a total of US$35,000 (equivalent to $1,250,000 in 2025) to finance the Association, with $20,000 made available immediately by the sale of property.

Curtiss, the American motorcycle designer and manufacturer and a recognized expert on gasoline engines, was recruited as a member of the association, and his associate Augustus Post assisted as representative from the Aero Club of America. Curtiss had visited the Wright brothers to discuss aeronautical engineering and offered them use of a 50 hp engine. Wilbur cordially declined, saying that a motor of their own development met their power needs, unaware that the AEA was about to become a serious competitor in powered flight. Bell wrote to U.S. President Theodore Roosevelt to have an interested young officer who had volunteered his help, U.S. Army Lieutenant Thomas Selfridge, officially detailed to Baddeck. Selfridge was assigned to the Aeronautical Division, U.S. Signal Corps on 3 August 1907, two days after its formation, and was sent to Nova Scotia. A year later, on 17 September 1908, while riding as a passenger with Orville Wright on a demonstration flight for the U.S. Army, he became the first person killed in an aircraft accident.

== First experiments ==
In 1898, Bell experimented with man-lifting tetrahedral kites and wings constructed of multiple compound tetrahedral kites covered in maroon silk. (Note: Bell was inspired in part by Australian aeronautical engineer Lawrence Hargrave's work with man-carrying box kites. Hargrave declined to take patents on his inventions, similar to Bell's decision not to file patents on some of his inventions. Bell also chose maroon-colored silk as it would show up clearly against the light-colored sky in his photographic studies.) The tetrahedral wings were named Cygnet I, II and III, and were flown both uncrewed and crewed (Cygnet I crashed during a flight carrying Selfridge) in the period from 1907 to 1912. Some of Bell's kites are on display at the Alexander Graham Bell National Historic Site.

== Later AEA designs ==
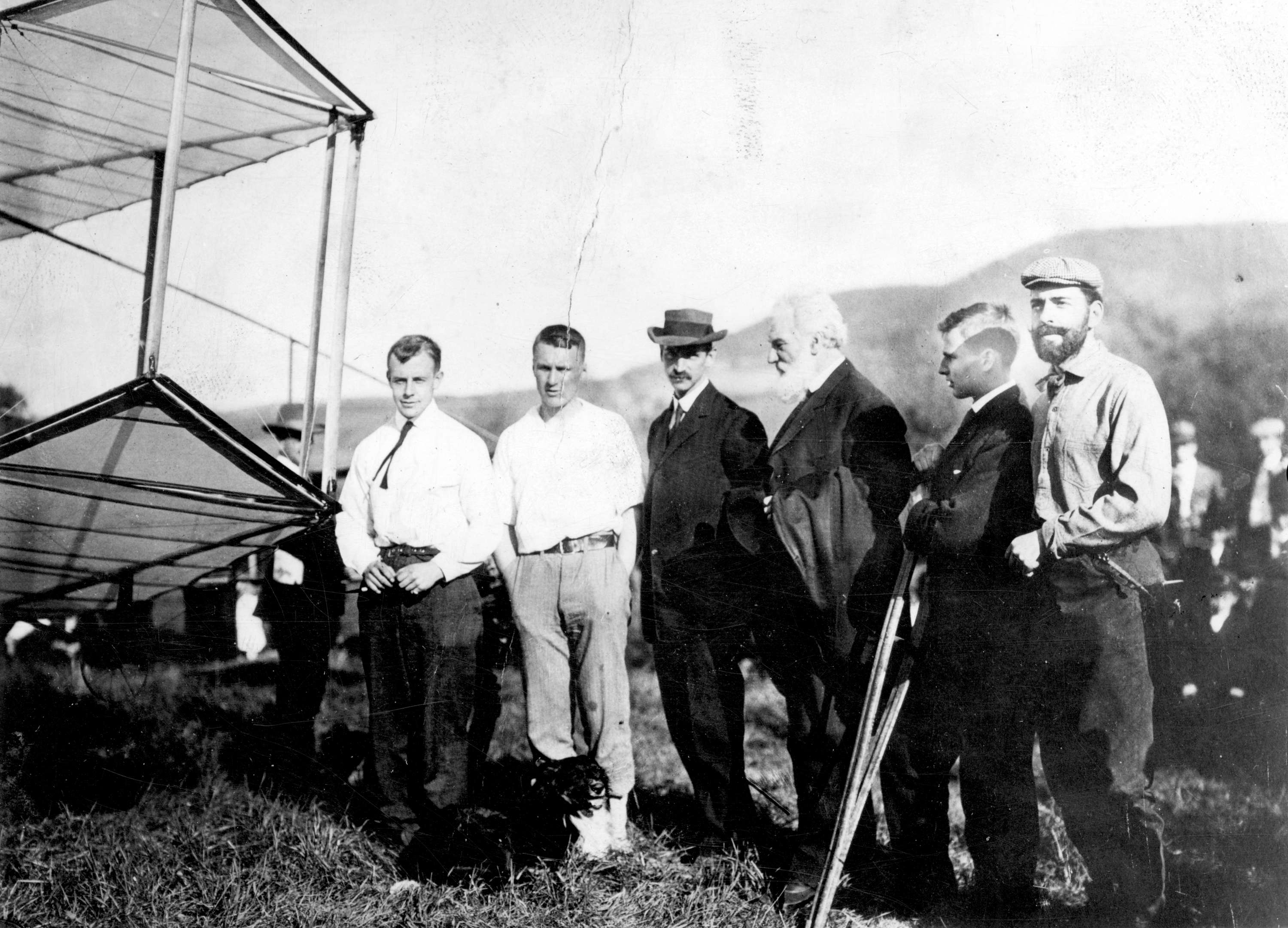
Aerial Experiment Association members Casey Baldwin, Tom Selfridge, Glenn Curtiss, Alexander Graham Bell, John McCurdy and Augustus Post serving as observer from Aero Club of America.

The AEA's work progressed to heavier-than-air machines, applying their knowledge of kites to gliders. The AEA collaboration led to very public success. Casey Baldwin became the first Canadian and first British subject pilot on 12 March 1908 flight of Red Wing. (Note: Quote: "Professor Alexander Graham Bell's New Machine, Built After Plans by Lieutenant Selfridge, Shown to Be Practicable by Flight Over Keuka Lake. Portion of Tail Gives Way, Bringing the Test to an End. Views of an Expert. Hammondsport, New York, 12 March 1908. Professor Alexander Graham Bell's new aeroplane, the Red Wing, was given its test flight over Lake Keuka today by F. W. Baldwin, the engineer in charge of its construction. The machine was built by the Aerial Experiment Association for Lieut. Thomas Selfridge, U.S.A.")

Its successor, White Wing, also of 1908, was the first airplane to have Bell's ailerons. The following design, the June Bug, also of 1908 and piloted by Curtiss, won the Scientific American Trophy by making the first official one-kilometer flight in North America, although the Wrights had already accomplished this in 1904.

Their fourth flying machine, the Silver Dart, also constructed in 1908, made the first controlled powered flight in Canada on 23 February 1909 when it was flown off the ice of Bras d'Or Lake near Baddeck by McCurdy, who had been one of its designers. On 10 March 1909, McCurdy set a record when he flew the Silver Dart on a circular course over a distance of more than 32 km (20 mi), a feat that the Wrights had already accomplished in 1905. The Association made the first passenger flight in Canada on 2 August, also in the Silver Dart.

Much development also took place in Hammondsport, New York, where in 1908 pioneering experimentation was done on seaplane carried out by Curtiss. In France Henri Fabre successfully flew the first powered seaplane in history, the Fabre Hydravion, in March 1910.

== Organization's dissolution ==
Bell's organization was established with a fixed term mandate, which was extended to March 31, 1909, by joint agreement of all its members, with Mrs. Bell contributing an additional $10,000 of financing. After Lt. Selfridge's death in September 1908, McCurdy became the organization's secretary and Bell's cousin, Charles J. Bell, became the Association's legal trustee. In March 1909, strained relations arose between Curtiss and the Association's other members. A request for him to attend the association's meeting and resolve the issue went unanswered.

It was also in March that Curtiss abruptly announced a new commercial venture—in partnership with Augustus Moore Herring and backed by wealthy members of the Aero Club of America—called the Herring-Curtiss Company. This new development, plus the fact that it effectively displaced the AEA's headquarters at Curtiss' own facility in Hammondsport, resulted in the AEA's mandate expiring without further extension on March 31.

== Aircraft designed and constructed ==
- AEA Glider (1907), biplane hang glider based on the designs and data shared by Octave Chanute
- Aerodrome No. 1 Red Wing (1908), Selfridge design, single-seat powered biplane
- Aerodrome No. 2 White Wing (1908), Baldwin design, single-seat powered biplane
- Aerodrome No. 3 June Bug (1908), Curtiss design, single-seat powered biplane
- Aerodrome No. 3A Loon (1908), June Bug modified as a floatplane
- Aerodrome No. 4 Silver Dart (1909), McCurdy design, powered biplane
- Aerodrome No. 5 Cygnet II & Cygnet III (1909), Bell design, single-seat powered aircraft with unorthodox wing
- Bell Oionus I (1910), tetrahedral triplane built after the AEA had disbanded, constructed at Baddeck Kite House, Nova Scotia, and Bell's final aviation pursuit. (Note: Built by McCurdy and Baldwin for Alexander Graham Bell)

== See also ==
- 1911 in aviation
