= AEA Cygnet =

Early Canadian aircraft

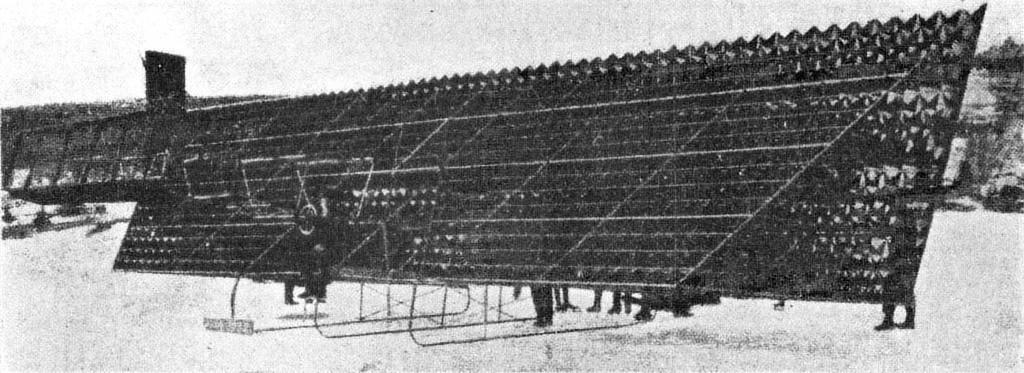
- The Cygnet II in 1909, at Baddeck, Nova Scotia

General information
- Type: Early experimental aircraft
- Manufacturer: Aerial Experiment Association
- Designer: Alexander Graham Bell
- Primary user: Aerial Experiment Association
- Number built: 4

History
- Manufactured: 1907–1912
- First flight: 6 December 1907
- Retired: 1910s

The Cygnet (or Aerodrome #5) was an extremely unorthodox early Canadian aircraft, with a wall-like "wing" made up of 3,393 tetrahedral cells. It was a powered version of the Cygnet tetrahedral kite designed by Alexander Graham Bell in 1907 and built by the newly founded Aerial Experiment Association.

== Design and development ==
Bell's experiments with tetrahedral kites had explored the advantages of utilizing great banks of cells to create a lifting body leading to the Cygnet I. On 6 December 1907, Thomas Selfridge piloted the kite as it was towed into the air behind a motorboat, eventually reaching a height of 168 ft (51 m). This was the first recorded heavier-than-air flight in Canada. While demonstrably able to fly as a person-carrying kite, it seemed unpromising as a direction for research into powered flight. It was difficult to control, and was in fact destroyed when it hit the water at the end of the flight.

The following year, a smaller copy of the design was built as the Cygnet II, now equipped with wheeled undercarriage and a Curtiss V-8 engine.

== Operational history ==
Attempts to fly the Cygnet II at Baddeck, Nova Scotia between 22 and 24 February 1909, met with failure. When the AEA Silver Dart was ready for flight testing, the engine was removed from the Cygnet II, and then returned. Rebuilt again as the Cygnet III with a more powerful 70 hp Gnome Gamma engine, its final flight was on 19 March 1912, at Bras d'Or Lake, Nova Scotia, piloted by John McCurdy. The results were highly unsatisfactory with the Cygnet III only able to lift off the ground for a foot or two, typically considered remaining in ground effect. After a final trial on 17 March, the tetrahedral cell bank failed structurally, leaving the aircraft irreparably damaged. The Cygnet II and III were abandoned following this flight attempt.

== Specifications (Cygnet III) ==
General characteristics

- Crew: 1
- Wingspan: 26 ft 4 in (8.03 m)
- Powerplant: 1 × Gnome Gamma 7-cyl. air-cooled rotary piston engine, 70 hp (52 kW)
- Propellers: 2-bladed

Performance

- Service ceiling: 168 ft (51 m)

== See also ==
- Man-lifting kite
- List of experimental aircraft
