= AEA White Wing =

Early American aircraft

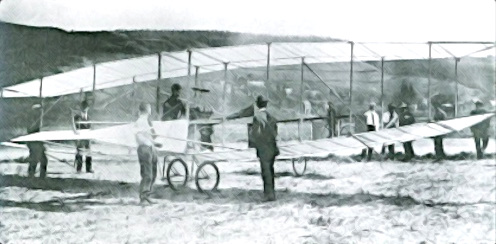

General information
- Type: Early experimental aircraft
- Manufacturer: Aerial Experimental Association
- Designer: Frederick W. Baldwin
- Status: Destroyed in crash
- Primary user: Aerial Experiment Association
- Number built: 1

History
- Manufactured: 1908
- First flight: 18 May 1908
- Last flight: 23 May 1908

The White Wing (or Aerodrome #2) was an early US aircraft designed by Frederick W. Baldwin and built by the Aerial Experiment Association in 1908. Unusual for aircraft of its day, it featured a wheeled undercarriage. The wings were equipped with ailerons controlled by a harness worn around the pilot's body; leaning in one direction would cause the aircraft to bank to follow. The ailerons led to a legal dispute with the Wright brothers over the brothers' patent on movable wing surfaces.

== History ==
First piloted by Baldwin himself on 18 May and the aircraft flew very well. White Wing was then piloted by Lt Thomas Selfridge at Hammondsport, New York, on 19 May 1908 (becoming the first US Army officer to fly an airplane) and then Glenn Curtiss made a flight of 1,017 ft (310 m) in it on 21 May. On 23 May, it crashed during a landing by John McCurdy and was damaged beyond repair.

== Specifications (White Wing) ==
Data from

General characteristics

- Length: 26 ft 3 in (8.00 m)
- Wingspan: 43 ft 3 in (13.18 m)
- Powerplant: 1 × Curtiss B-8 V-8 air-cooled piston engine, 40 hp (30 kW)

Performance

- Range: 0 mi (0 km, 0 nmi) 1,000ft

== See also ==
Related lists

- List of experimental aircraft
