= Frederick Walker Baldwin =

Canadian hydrofoil & aviation pioneer (1882-1948)

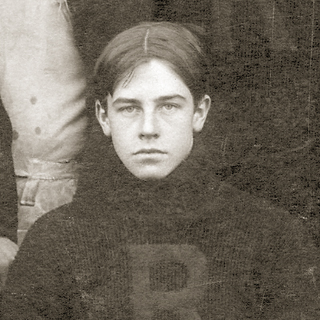
- "Casey" Baldwin at Ridley College, circa 1900
- Born: Frederick Walker Baldwin; January 2, 1882; Toronto, Ontario, Canada
- Died: August 7, 1948 (age 66); Beinn Bhreagh, Nova Scotia, Canada
- Other name: Casey Baldwin
- Education: Ridley College; University of Toronto (P. Eng, 1906)
- Occupation: Engineer
- Relatives: Robert Baldwin (grandfather)

Member of the Nova Scotia House of Assembly for Victoria
- In office 1933–1937
- Preceded by: Donald Buchanan McLeod
- Succeeded by: John Malcolm Campbell

Frederick Walker Baldwin (January 2, 1882 – August 7, 1948), also known as Casey Baldwin, paternal grandson of Canadian reform leader Robert Baldwin, was a hydrofoil and aviation pioneer and partner of the famous inventor Alexander Graham Bell. He was manager of Graham Bell Laboratories from 1909 to 1932, and represented Victoria in the Nova Scotia Legislature from 1933 to 1937, where he was instrumental in bringing about the creation of Cape Breton Highlands National Park. In 1908, he became the first Canadian and British subject to fly an airplane.

== Biography ==
Born in Toronto, Ontario, Casey Baldwin was educated at Ridley College, where he held prominent student leadership roles, won the Blake Gold Medal, and was captain of the cricket team.

As an undergraduate student at the University of Toronto, he served in the Second Field Company of Canadian Engineers. He graduated from University of Toronto in 1906, with a degree in electrical and mechanical engineering. Following graduation, Baldwin went to Ithaca, New York, to attend a summer session at Cornell University. He then travelled to Baddeck, Nova Scotia, to visit the home of his college friend Douglas McCurdy and the famous inventor Alexander Graham Bell. On October 1, 1907, with the encouragement and generous financial support of Bell's wife Mabel Hubbard Bell, Bell, Baldwin, McCurdy, and two Americans, Glenn Curtiss and Thomas Selfridge, formed the Aerial Experiment Association (AEA) with the express purpose to "get in the air".

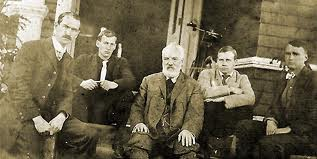
Aerial Experiment Association. Casey (second from right), Bell (centre), McCurdy, Curtis, and Selfridge

Baldwin used his engineering skills to help build the Silver Dart plus several other experimental aircraft. On March 12, 1908 at Lake Keuka, New York he became the first Canadian, and either the third or fourth North American, to pilot an airplane. William Whitney Christmas claimed to have first flown his aircraft on various dates from September 1907 to March 1908 near Fairfax, Virginia. The first two successful pilots were, of course, the famous Wright brothers, but it seems unlikely that it will ever be firmly established whether Christmas or Baldwin was the so-called "Third Man."

Baldwin also helped design and build the White Wing airplane and the Red Wing, piloting the latter in a public demonstration of powered aircraft flight at Hammondsport, New York in 1908.

In the summer of 1908, Casey Baldwin and Alexander Graham Bell began discussing powered watercraft and began building and testing various types before turning to the construction of an aircraft that could take off from water that the two called a "hydrodrome." While the project was temporarily shelved, in 1919 Baldwin built the HD-4 hydrofoil that set a world water speed record of 114 km/h on Bras d'Or Lake. However, the watercraft was not a commercial success and the HD-4 project was ended in 1921.

Following the death of Alexander Graham Bell (August 2, 1922), Casey Baldwin continued boat building and experimenting in hydrofoils in Cape Breton as Director of Graham Bell Laboratories. Bell's last words in 1922 were "Stand by Casey," an encouragement to his family to continue Baldwin's work. A local celebrity, in 1933 Baldwin was elected to the Provincial Legislature as the member from Victoria County. He was one of the founders of the Cruising Club of America.

Casey Baldwin died in Beinn Bhreagh, Nova Scotia in 1948. Following its creation, in 1974 he was inducted posthumously into Canada's Aviation Hall of Fame. In his honour, the Casey Baldwin Award is granted annually by the Canadian Aeronautics and Space Institute to the authors of the best paper published in the Canadian Aeronautics and Space Journal.
