= Curtiss Aerocar =

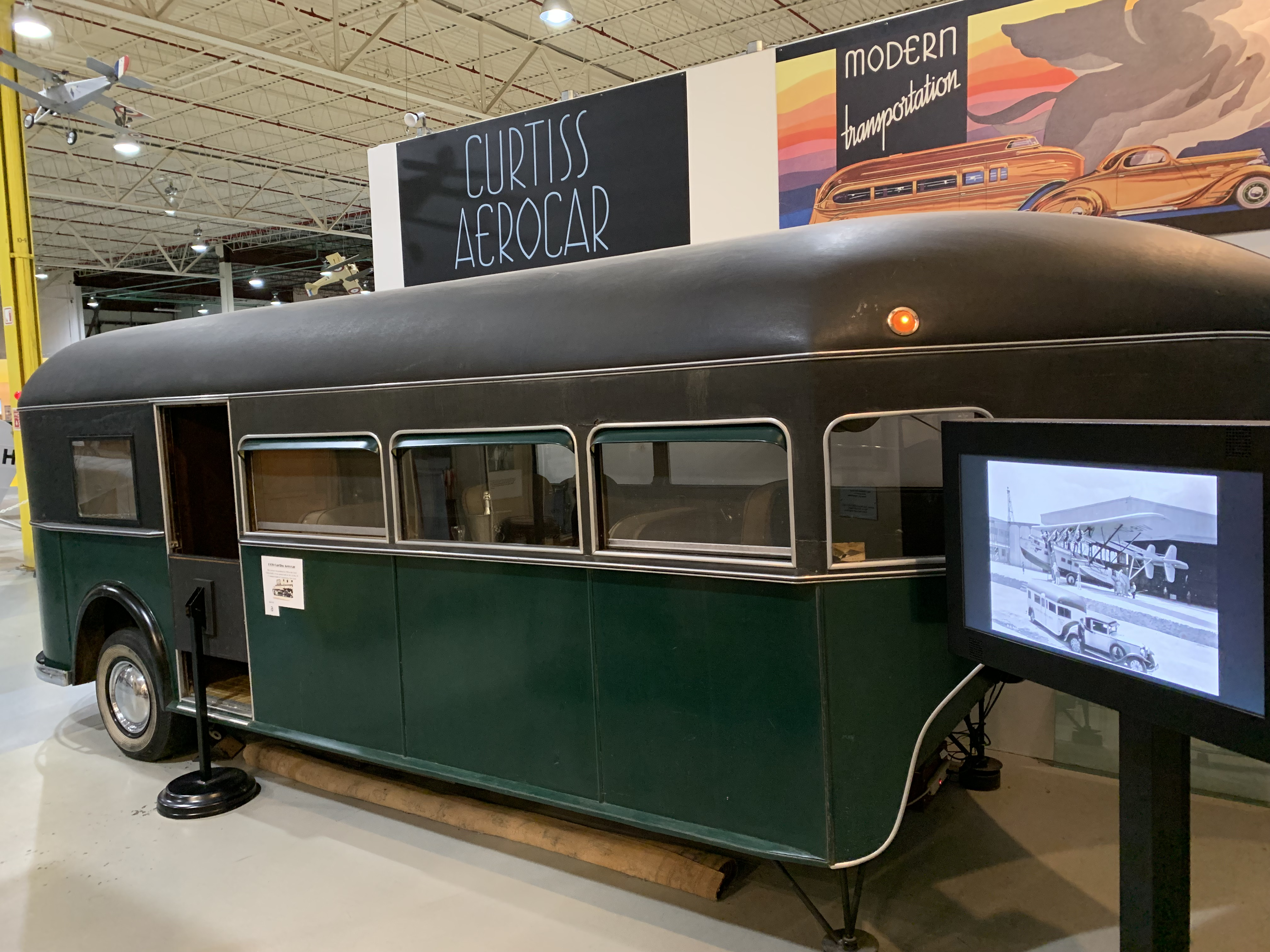
The Curtiss Aerocar at the Glenn H. Curtiss Museum, Hammondsport, NY

The Curtiss Aerocar was a multi-purpose, fifth-wheeled trailer designed by Glenn Hammond Curtiss and built in Opa-locka and Coral Gables, Florida and Detroit, Michigan in the US between 1928 and 1940.

The Curtiss Aerocar is the first-known production travel trailer built in the US and the first-known production travel trailer in the world to use a fifth wheel coupling.

The Curtiss Aerocar was designed on aircraft principles using lightweight materials and aerodynamic styling. It was both fast and stable, reaching speeds in excess of 70 mph under tow. The Curtiss Aerocar was used for public transport, mobile commerce and haulage purposes as well as recreation during the late 1920s and 1930s.

Called by Fortune Magazine in 1937 "the Rolls-Royce of the trailers", Florida-built Aerocar models cost $2,500 and above in 1929 and were custom-built for the wealthy. Lower-priced production models of the Aerocar ($1,000 to $1,500 in 1929) were manufactured under licence in Detroit. Prices increased at both locations during the 1930s.

The Aerocar's fully-enclosed cabin furnished with luxury amenities enabled owners to take recreational vehicle vacations in hitherto unknown levels of comfort. In facilitating fast and safe long-distance travel by road it offered a viable alternative to interstate railroad and air travel and played a leading role in the development of the US travel trailer industry.

== The Curtiss Camp Car (1919) ==
The Curtiss Camp Car (1919) was the first recreational vehicle known to have been built by Curtiss for private use. It was an early fifth-wheeled RV that was the prototype of the Aerocar.

As well as being an aviator and motorcyclist Curtiss was also a keen hunter and camper. In 1919 he developed in association with his half-brother G. Carl Adams at least one prototype camping trailer for use on private vacations in New York and Florida. Curtiss' aim in building a recreational vehicle was to create a camping experience comfortable enough for the whole family. The prototype vehicle was conceived as a fifth-wheel trailer and named the Camp Car. Its design and key features would be replicated in the Curtiss Aerocar eight years later.

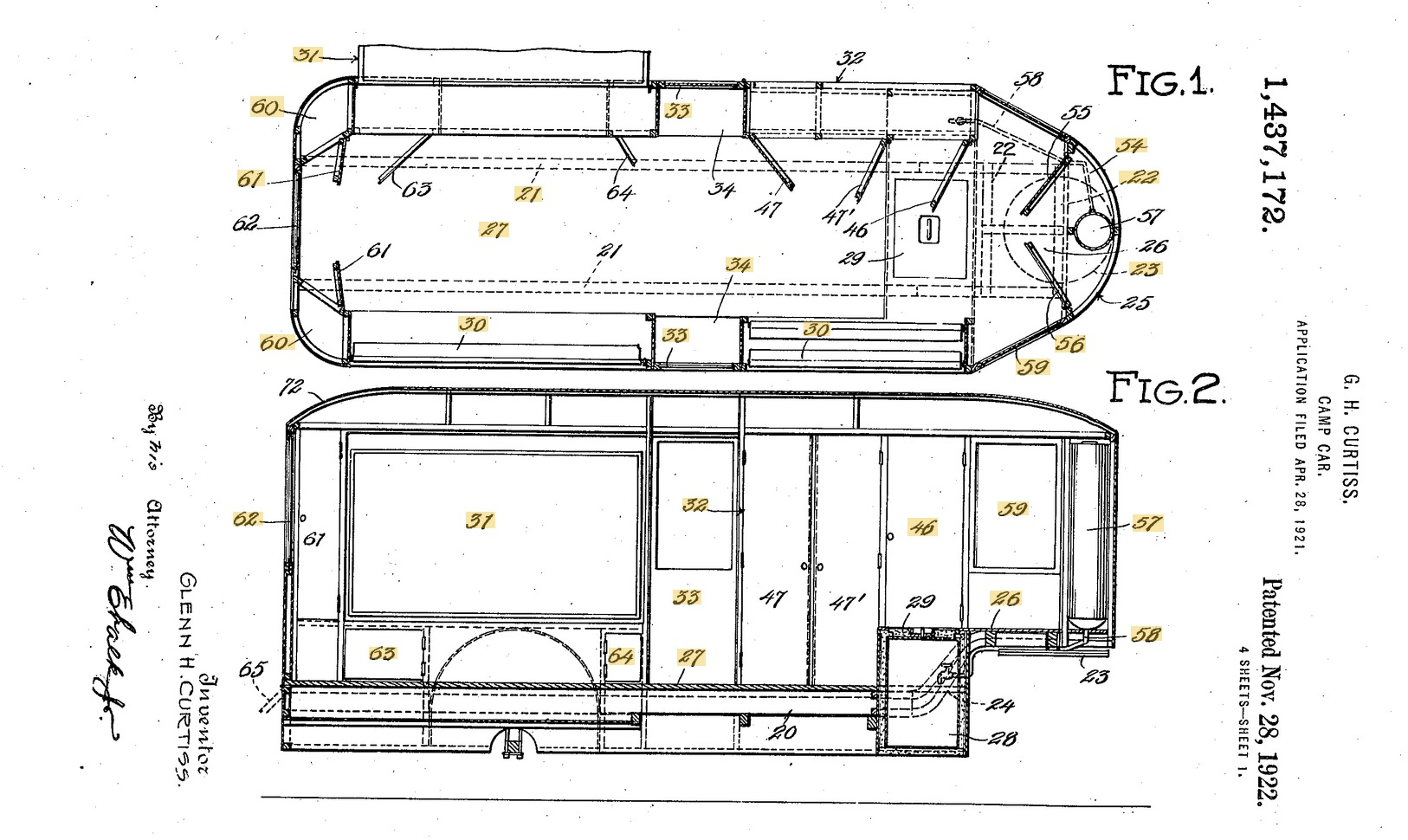
The Curtiss Camp Car patent (US1437172)

A patent for the Camp Car (US Pat. No. 1437172) was filed on 28 April 1921 and issued on 28 November 1922. Although the Curtiss Camp Car patent referred to a second forthcoming patent application for a Curtiss-designed fifth-wheel coupling, no such patent was submitted. Images of the Camp Car held in the archives of the Glenn H. Curtiss Museum indicate that the fifth-wheel hitch used was the commercially available Martin Rocking Fifth Wheel.

== The Adams Motorbungalo (1920-22) ==
The Adams Motorbungalo was the first recreational vehicle designed by Curtiss in 1920 that went into production.

Although Adams wrote in 1921 that the Camp Car weighed over two tons and was too heavy to navigate sandy or swampy ground, there was sufficient interest in the idea from other campers for Curtiss and Adams to refine the design and go into limited production. It came in several variants costing up to $1,200 and was manufactured by the Adams Trailer Corporation at Hammondsport and Long Island, New York.

The revised camping trailer was known as The Adams Motorbungalo (also "Adams Motorbungalow" and "Adams Motor Bungalo") named after Carl Adams. The Adams Motorbungalo was a shorter, lighter trailer than the Camp Car featuring space-saving 'pullman' (drop-down) beds rather than fold-outs. It used a conventional ball hitch in order to suit a wide range of tow vehicles. The chassis was based on a small goods trailer originally used in Curtiss aircraft factories to transport aircraft engines and machinery. Both the goods trailer and Adams Motorbungalo were patented in Canada (CA222,875 issued on 22 August 1922 and CA 221,009 issued on 18 July 1922).

Despite strong initial demand for the Adams Motorbungalo, it was too expensive for the average auto camper and only about 100 units were produced between 1920 and 1922. Manufacturing ceased when Carl Adams left New York to join Curtiss in Florida in 1922. The Adams Trailer Corporation was dissolved in December 1922.

== The Brighton Trailer (1927) ==
From 1920 until his death on 23 July 1930 Curtiss was heavily involved in community and real estate development in south Florida. In partnership with local cattle farmer and agricultural innovator James H. Bright, Curtiss developed the new cities of Hialeah (1921), Country Club Estates (1924, renamed Miami Springs in 1930) and Opa-locka (1926), collectively known as the Curtiss-Bright Cities. To support these new communities Curtiss and Bright became patrons of Miami's backcountry and undertook agricultural, farm animal, irrigation, drainage and even aerial seeding trials in the Miami region with the goal of improving agricultural resilience, long-term employment and year-round commercial activity in an otherwise winter-focused, tourist-driven economy.

In about 1927 truck farmers who worked on Curtiss-Bright-owned land at Brighton in Florida under a co-operative farming model were provided by Curtiss with one or more basic fifth-wheel goods trailers designed by Curtiss and probably built by former aviator and Aerocar engineer Hugh Robinson to deliver their farming produce to retail, restaurant and hotel customers in Miami. The farming trailer bore a close resemblance to the Curtiss Camp Car.

In April 1928 entrepreneur and Miami Beach developer Carl G. Fisher was given a ride in the farming trailer. Fisher was so taken by the experience that he persuaded Curtiss to patent the trailer and develop it for broader commercial and recreational use. Fisher used his extensive contacts among the "gasoline aristocracy" of Detroit to drum up interest in the trailer while Curtiss produced an improved prototype that would become known as the Aerocar. In August 1928 one of the Curtiss farm trailers was repainted, rebadged as an Aerocar and used as a rolling billboard to advertise Curtiss properties to northern farmers.

In a letter dated 30 April 1928 to Roy D. Chapin, chairman of the Hudson Motor Car Company, Fisher wrote that "Glenn Curtiss has the greatest trailer that was ever made in America." Following the prototype's much-publicized 39-hour trip from Miami to New York between 5 and 8 August 1928 to demonstrate the Aerocar could outpace the railroads, orders started flowing. The Aerocar Corporation was formed on 14 September 1928. Aerocars went into limited production in a vacant workshop at 1170 Sharazad, Opa-locka, Florida in late 1928.

== Design ==
Although the Adams Motorbungalo used a conventional ball hitch, Curtiss reverted to the fifth wheel concept used in the Curtiss Camp Car for the Aerocar but used this time a fifth wheel hitch of his own design. In an article in the December 1930 edition of U.S. Air Services magazine, Curtiss' Florida acquaintance Colonel James Prentice of the US Army stated that Curtiss had remarked to him that during his flying days he had noticed how stable aircraft were when towed backwards between factory and airfield with their rear landing skid resting on top of a tow truck. The towing experience was reputed to be so comfortable that men who rode on aircraft under tow in this way would sometimes fall asleep. Curtiss sought to duplicate this effect using the Aerocar's fifth wheel configuration.

Curtiss detested the cramped space, noise and vibration transferred to passengers in a standard automobile, claiming they led to a form of "auto-intoxication". He was scathing of automobile design of the 1920s and offered his own solutions to these issues by using triangulated suspension, aerodynamic design and in later years, front-wheel drive (see Curtiss Automobiles below). Separating the engine from passengers by using a tow vehicle and trailer combination was a simple solution to the problem of road and engine noise and vibration affecting passenger comfort and explains Curtiss' preference for trailers over motorhomes when designing leisure vehicles.

The chassis of the Aerocar was of monocoque design and used a lightweight wooden frame held together by struts, wires and turnbuckles similar to those used in the Curtiss JN "Jenny" airplane of 1915. The frame was lined with Celotex, a Florida-produced insulation board made from sugar cane and waterproofed with RubRos, another Florida product made of rubber and rosin.

== The Aero Coupler (1928) ==
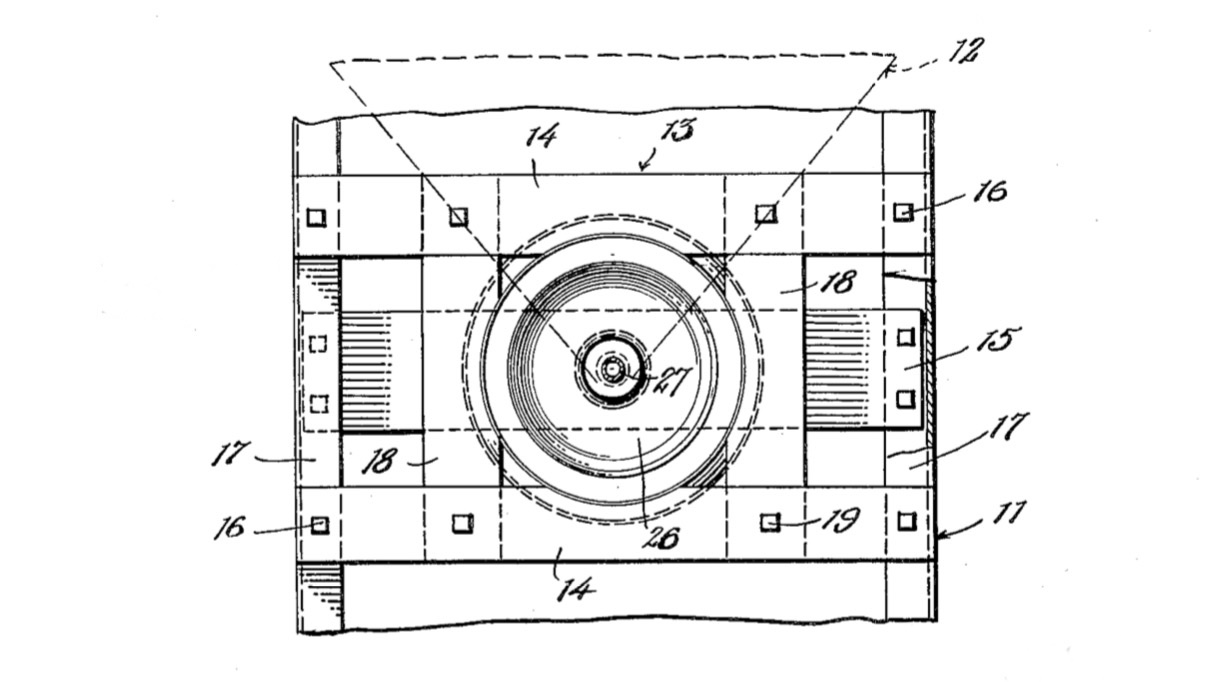
The Aero Coupler patent drawing (1928)

For the Aerocar Curtiss invented a new type of shock-absorbing fifth wheel hitch called the Aero Coupler (sometimes "Aerocoupler"). A similar hitch was used in The Brighton Trailer and may have been the hitch referred to (but not patented) in the Curtiss Camp Car patent of 1921. It consisted of a pneumatic aircraft wheel mounted horizontally within a square wooden (later aluminum) frame that was bolted to the rear of the tow vehicle (usually a modified coupe to accommodate the hitch) above its rear axle. A king pin mounted at the front of the Aerocar was inserted into the center of the wheel. Under tow the Aero Coupler's tire was inflated to a low pressure and would absorb shocks and vibrations from all directions. A patent for the "Curtiss Flexible Coupling" (US1916967) was applied for on 8 June 1928 and granted on 4 July 1933, three years after Curtiss' death.

As with all fifth-wheel hitches, mounting the hitch over the rear axle of the tow vehicle reduced both sway and the risk of rollover compared to conventional hitches mounted to the tow bar at the rear of the tow vehicle.

== Aerocar Manufacturing (1928-30) ==
Although the Aerocar's main customers would be located in wealthy northern states, it was Curtiss' wish that the Aerocar be manufactured in the Miami region to help support the southern Florida economy. Curtiss did however yield to other Aerocar shareholders by agreeing that the Aerocar should also be manufactured under license in Detroit by the Aerocar Company of Detroit. This was a company established to build Aerocars by Briggs Manufacturing Co., Detroit automobile and body manufacturers and close contacts of Fisher. The Detroit Aerocar factory was located at 7425 Melville St., Detroit and later at 4815 Cabot Ave., Detroit. Parts, labor and customers were closer at hand in Detroit than in Miami.

The first Aerocars were built for a range of buyers including leisure travelers, resort owners and travelling salesmen. At Curtiss' suggestion, Aerocars were developed as ground transportation for newly emerging airlines including Southwest Air Fast Express (SAFE), Transcontinental Air Transport (TAT) and Pan American Airways (Pan Am). In December 1929 four Aerocars were delivered to Cuba including one gifted to Cuban President Gerardo Machiado to help foster closer business ties between Florida and Cuba.

Early Aerocars were spacious and elaborately fitted out but lacked attention to detail. Fisher (who ordered four Aerocars for use at his proposed development in Montauk, New York) complained in 1929 of a lack of wind-down windows, that no jacks were provided and that the toilet was noisy. Quality improved as orders increased, however.

Florida-built Aerocars were generally regarded as superior to those built in Detroit, with each Florida vehicle tailor-made for its client. Detroit Aerocars were built in larger numbers and to standard specifications. Only Florida-built Aerocars were called "Curtiss Aerocars" at the time, but the Curtiss name is today generally applied to both Miami- and Detroit-built Aerocars in order to distinguish them from other vehicles or flying cars bearing the Aerocar name.

== Aerocar Manufacturing (1930-37) ==
After Curtiss' death in 1930 Aerocar production continued in Detroit but ground to a halt in Florida as company employees were deeply affected by the premature death of a close friend and colleague. The impact of the Great Depression was felt heavily by Aerocar directors who were forced to focus on saving their main businesses in automobile manufacturing, real estate and aviation. As a small side business of its owners, Aerocar was left to flounder.

In 1932, under the new ownership of energy magnate and Miami Biltmore Hotel owner Henry Latham Doherty, Aerocar's Florida operations revived. In 1933 the Aerocar Corporation moved from Opa-Locka to larger premises at 300 Valencia Avenue, Coral Gables which incorporated a showroom alongside the workshop. New Aerocar models, including an observation deck model designed by Hugh Robinson and several commercial variants were produced between 1932 and 1935 (see Other Curtiss Road Vehicles below). A fleet of at least 14 Aerocars used to ferry guests between Doherty-owned hotel and sports clubs was a common sight in Miami in the mid 1930s, although Curtiss Aerocar Co. President Harry C. Genung later complained that Doherty would not permit Aerocars to be sold to other hotels that competed with Doherty.

The Aerocar Company of Detroit had at least two changes of ownership during the 1930s and faced intense competition from cheaper, mass-produced travel trailer manufacturers including Covered Wagon (which began manufacturing travel trailers two years after Aerocar in 1930) and Schult Trailers. More affordable Detroit-built Aerocars were popular with commercial users (see Early Business Owners below) and it was this sector which helped keep the Detroit Aerocar factory in business until the late 1930s.

== Decline (1937-40) ==
From the mid 1930s the upmarket Aerocar could no longer isolate itself from the prolonged effects of the Great Depression, intense competition and the commoditization of the US travel trailer industry. The most common Aerocar newspaper advertisements after 1936 were for the sale of used or ex-display models at significantly reduced prices.

With the lack of a strong figurehead after Curtiss' death in 1930, the Aerocar Corporation splintered into three competing groups: loyal Curtiss family members, friends and employees in Florida, financially-driven shareholders in New York and the cost-conscious licensed manufacturer in Detroit. These groups could not agree on the future direction of Aerocar and the company lost its way. Poor patent enforcement and the appearance of several Aerocar lookalikes compounded the company's problems.

Aerocars continued to inspire vehicle and industrial designers such as Brooks Stevens who designed an Aerocar-based Zephyr Land Cruiser for Milwaukee billionaire William Woods Plankinton III. New Aerocar models were introduced in Detroit in 1937 to try to reverse declining sales but their impact was limited. Aerocar in Florida was forced to downsize to a basement garage in the Miami Biltmore Hotel in 1939, advertising repairs of all makes of trailer. Detroit continued production until 1938. By 1940 all Aerocar production had ceased.

Although precise production numbers are unknown, between Miami and Detroit it is estimated that about 1,000 Aerocars were built.

== Models and prices ==
At least 37 different versions of the Aerocar were produced in Miami and Detroit during its life. Early Miami Aerocars were almost all custom-built while Detroit models were mass-produced but in limited numbers. Known models along with their prices include:

=== 1929 (Miami) ===
- Model 61 (trailer only), $2,500
- Model 61-A (ambulance), $3,000
- Model 61-C (camping), $2,600
- Model 61-G (commercial/garbage truck), $2,850
- Model 61-H (horse trailer), $3,500
- Model 61-HS (tall horse trailer), $3,750
- Model 61-O (observation windows all round), $2,750
- Model 61-OS (observation with reclining seats at rear), $2,900
- Model 61-P (12-passenger transport bus), $2,500
- Model 71-S (streamline club car), $3,000

=== 1929 (Detroit) ===
- Model C-20 (standard Commercial Car), $1,000
- Model B-20 (standard School Bus), $1,200
- Model A-20 (standard Tourist Car), $1,500
- Model D-20 (standard Passenger Bus), $1,500

=== 1932 (Miami) ===
- Model 161-C (chassis only), $1,985
- Model 161-C (with kitchen), $2,365
- Model 161-C (with kitchen and 2 berths), $2,645
- Model 161-C (with kitchen and 4-berths), $2,840

=== 1933 (Miami) ===
- Model 161-B (fully-equipped 4-bed tourer), $5,235
- Model 100-JCA (fully-equipped 2-bed tourer), $3,600
- Model 161-SP (fully-equipped tourer with chauffeur's compartment), $4,500-$6,5000
- Model 161-E (as per Model 161-B with flushing toilet, stainless steel galley, large cabinets), $4,025-$4,250
- Model 161-BS (four chairs convertible to single beds, upper berths), $4,500-$6,000
- Model 161-BPC (as per Model 161-B with observation cockpit), $6,000-$8,5000
- Model 161-P (14-seater bus), $3,850
- Model 61-P (12-seater bus), $3,700
- Model 261-P (23-seater bus), $4,400
- Model 261-PC (23-seater bus with observation cockpit), $5,200

=== Mid 1930s (Detroit) ===
- Model A-16 (16ft Sportsman), $1,300
- Model A-20 (20ft Cruiser), $1,650
- Model A-20 (20ft Tourist), $1,650
- Model C-16 (16ft), $1,000
- Model C-20 (20ft), $1,150
- Model C-22 (22ft), price on request

Some of the available Aerocar options in Miami-built models of 1929 included a lavatory ($105), radio ($179.50), refrigerator ($92.50), stove ($51), speaking tube from Aerocar to driver ($40), cigar lighter ($10.25), thermos ($13.25) and clock and barometer ($22.50).

In 1937 Pleasantaire air conditioning became available as option at $199.50. A steel-bodied Aerocar was offered in about 1938. After this time only used and demonstrator Aerocars were advertised for sale at significantly reduced prices.

== Early business owners ==
Commercial uses included school and passenger buses, horse and furniture transport, ambulances, airline ground transportation, mobile showrooms, kitchen and electrical appliance displays, mobile sound and radio studios and even a mobile casket display. Some of the companies who were known users of Aerocars included:

- Ogden Candy (1928)
- Peoria Casket Company (1929)
- Southwest Air Fast Express (1929)
- Transcontinental Air Transport (1929)
- Clark's Top and Body Works (1930)
- Enna Jettick (1930)
- Friendly Five Shoes (1930)
- Lail Brothers (1930)
- Pan American Airways (1930)
- Philbrick Ambulance (1930)
- Standard Talking Machine (1930)
- Fessenden White (1930s)
- J.E. Burke Co. (1930s)
- Edw. K. Tryon (1930s)
- National Amplifying Systems (1930s)
- Old Ben Coal Corporation (1930s)
- San Antonio Drug Company (1930s)
- Speaker Hines Printing Co.(1930s)
- Norge Electric Refrigerators (1931)
- John Housley Cigar Company (1931)
- Wofford Oil Company (1931)
- General Electric Company (1932)
- Florida Year Round Clubs (1933)
- Roosevelt Warm Springs Institute (1933)
- Cities Services Company (1934)
- Fostoria Glass Co. (1934)
- Crosley Radios (1935)
- Activated Alum Corp (1936)
- RCA (1936)
- Brooklyn Borough Gas Company (1937)
- Grove Laboratories (1937)
- Modern Equipment Corporation (1937)
- The Grolier Society (1937)
- Servel Electrolux (1937)
- Toledo Scales (1937)
- Trinity Portland Cement (1937)
- Indiana State Board of Health Dental Unit (1938)
- Wayside Cathedral (1939)

== Early private owners ==
- G. Carl Adams (Miami)
- C.W. Bell (Boston)
- Arthur K. Bourne (California)
- Ruth Bryan Owen (Miami)
- Henry L. Doherty (New York)
- G. MacCulloch Miller (Long Island)
- Hugh McDonald (New York)
- Marquis George MacDonald (Princeton, New Jersey)
- Charles A. Munn (Palm Beach)
- William Woods Plankinton, Jr. (Milwaukee)
- Augustus Post (New York)
- W.G. Potts (Chicago)
- W.T. Sampson Smith (New York)
- John L. Senior (New York)
- Congressman Glenn B. Skipper (Florida)
- W.K. Vanderbilt (Long Island)
- Philip K. Wrigley (Chicago)

== Aerocars still in existence ==
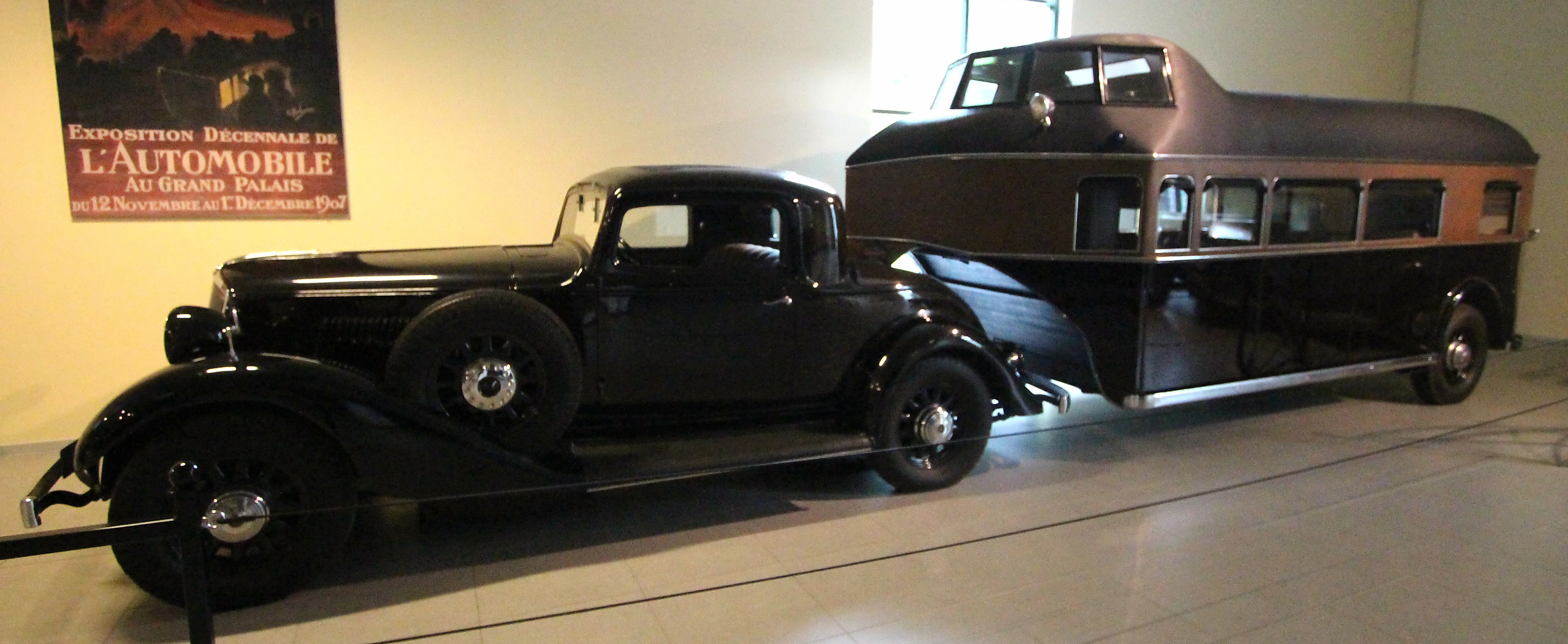
The Curtiss Aerocar at the Louwman Museum in The Netherlands

The Aerocar owned by Mr. and Mrs. W. T. Sampson Smith at the Glenn H. Curtiss Museum.

The Aerocar owned by New York banker Hugh McDonald at The Louwman Museum in The Netherlands.

A small number of Aerocars are known to be held in private collections in the US.

== Aerocar-based commercial trailers ==
The Curtiss Aerocar was one of a family of Curtiss-designed or -inspired road vehicles, some of which were designed and built after Curtiss' death by Aerocar employees. These included:

- The Curtiss Trailer Bus (1922). A fifth-wheel passenger bus designed by Curtiss and built by Curtiss mechanic John Thiel and the Adams Trailer Corporation in New York. The Curtiss Trailer Bus and a second larger bus built at Hialeah were used in Florida to take prospective real estate investors from downtown Miami to inspect Curtiss-Bright-owned land. A double-decker version was built in 1923 to serve as a tourist bus in Miami

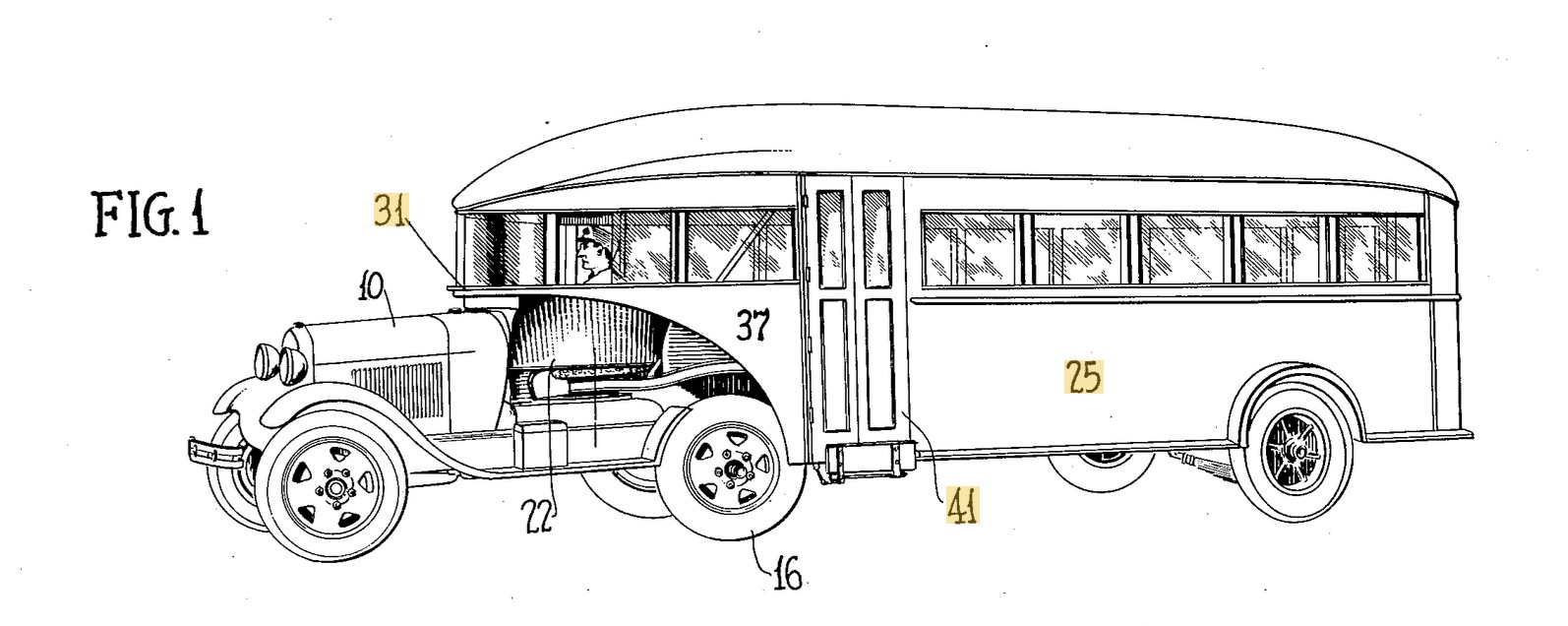
Drawing from the Aerocoach Patent of the Curtiss Motor Vehicle of 1931(US1980613)

- The Aerocoach (1931). A passenger bus version of the Aerocar designed by Curtiss based on the Curtiss Trailer Bus (1922) but built after Curtiss' death by Aerocar of Florida. The Aerocoach patent (US 1,980,613 filed on 1 Apri 1931 and approved on 13 November 1934) was submitted by Curtiss' widow, Lena P. Curtiss, after Curtiss' death. The Aerocoach was trialled by a few bus companies including Greyhound Lines but never saw regular service, possibly due to passenger safety concerns associated with a lightweight trailer
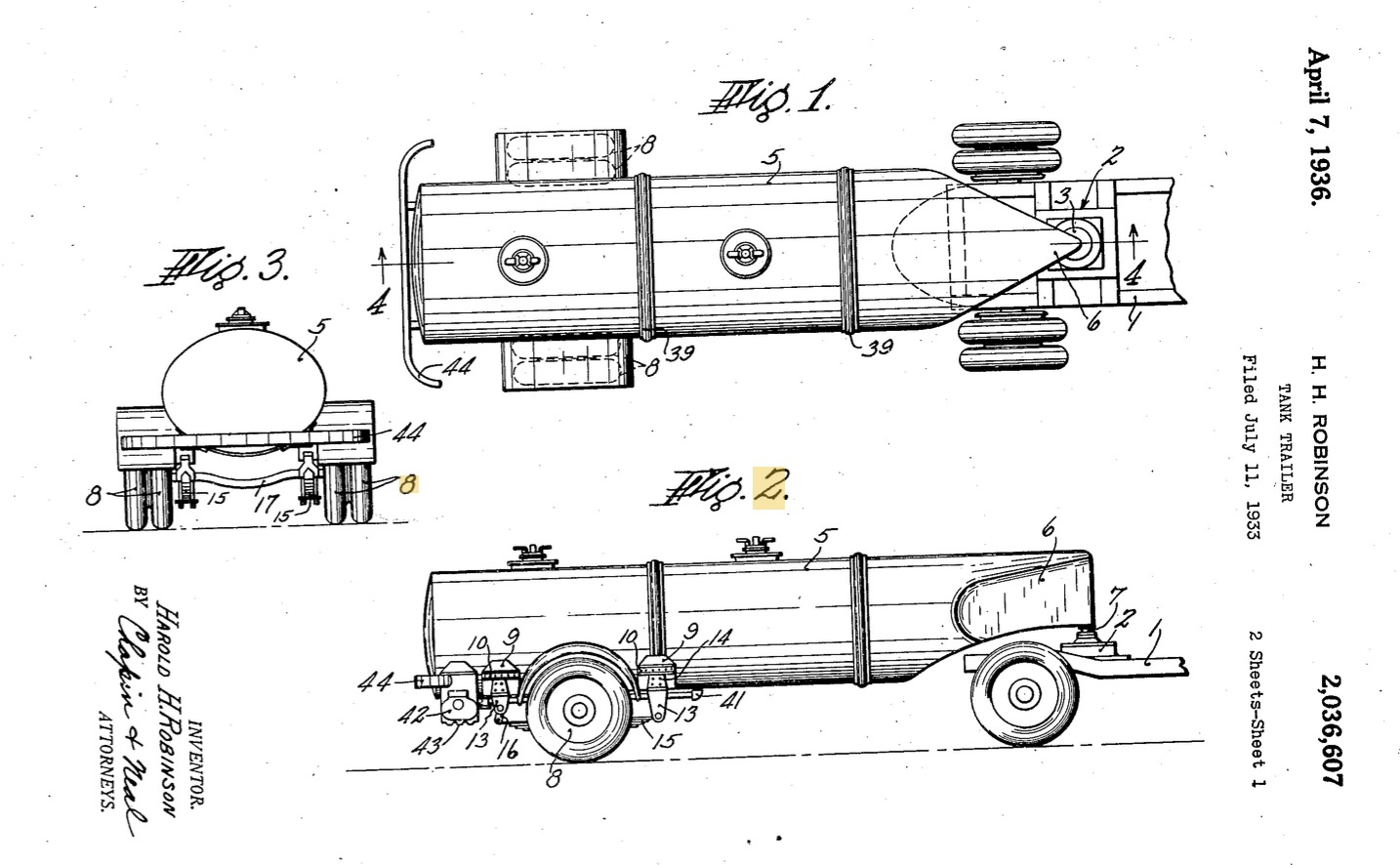
  Patent drawing from Harold H. Robinson's Tank Trailer of 1931 (US2036607)
- The Aerotank (1933). A liquid-carrying trailer for gasoline, oil, water etc., using the Aero Coupler to absorb shocks. Designed by Hugh Robinson's son Harold H. Robinson who later became Aerocar's president in 1937. The Aerotank was patented as a Tank Trailer (US 2,036,607 filed on 11 July 1933 and approved on 7 April 1936)

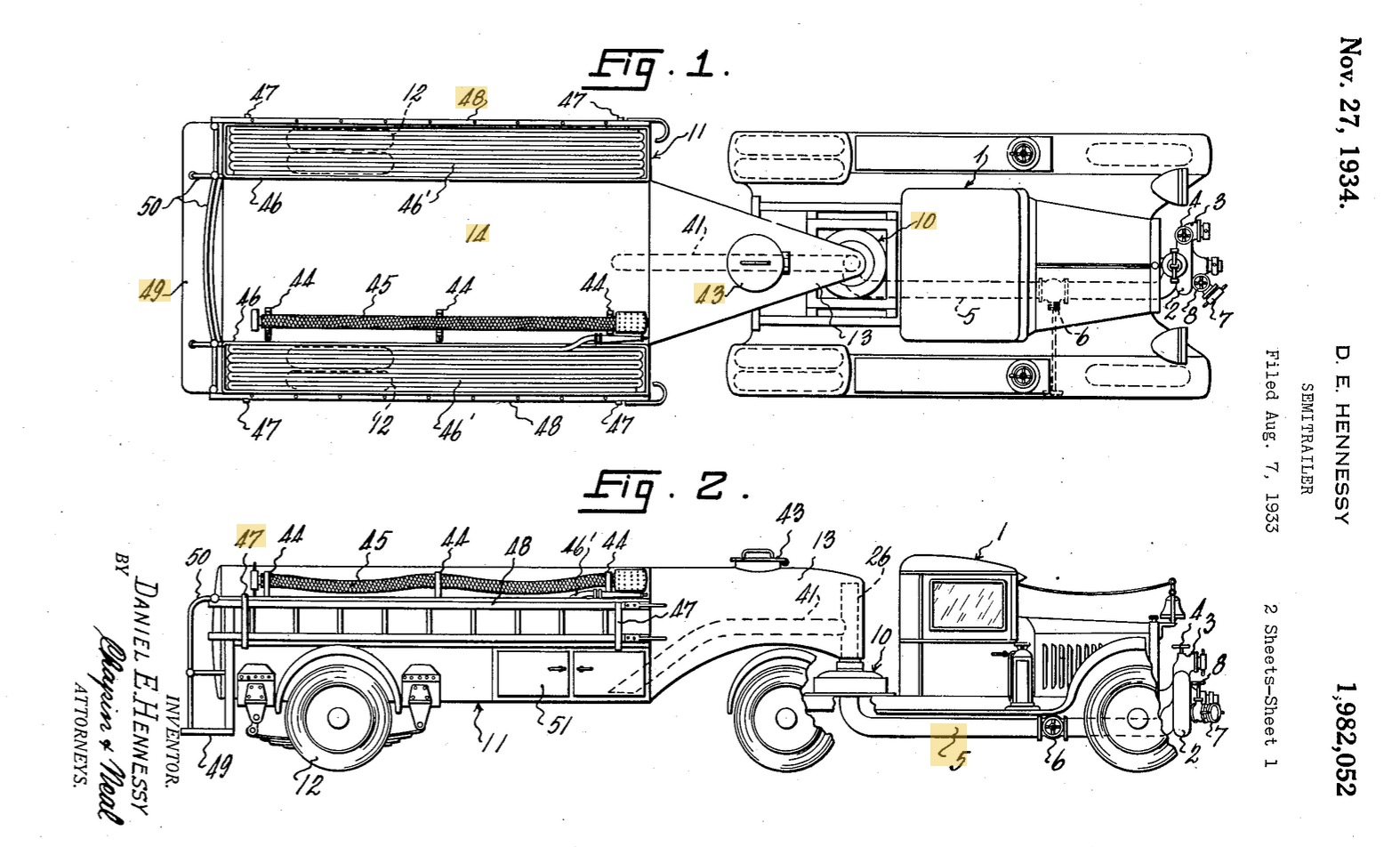
D.E. Hennessy's fire truck patent (US1982052)

- Fire Truck (1933). A firefighting semitrailer with self-contained water pump, using the Aerocar design. Submitted by Curtiss Aerocar Company employee Daniel E. Hennessy after Curtiss's death. Patent number US 1,982,052 filed on 7 August 1933 and approved on 27 November 1934.

Other commercial vehicles based on the Aerocar design were a horse trailer (1929), goods removal trailer (1929) and a garbage truck (1929, sometimes called an Aerotruck) but these are not known to have been independently patented.

== Curtiss Automobiles ==
As part of Curtiss' lifelong interest in roadgoing vehicles (he was reported to have owned 27 automobiles by 1913) Curtiss also designed automobiles. His early designs included four automobiles built by Brunn & Co. of Buffalo, New York and modified by Curtiss between 1912 and 1916 and an autoplane prototype exhibited at the Pan-American Aeronautic Exposition in New York in February 1917.

In 1921 Curtiss formed The Curtiss Motor Car Company to explore new automotive uses for surplus Curtiss OX-5 aircraft engines after World War One, but despite trialling the OX-5 in Prado, Winton and Marmon automobiles, the Depression of 1920-21 cut short these experiments and the company ceased operations in 1922.

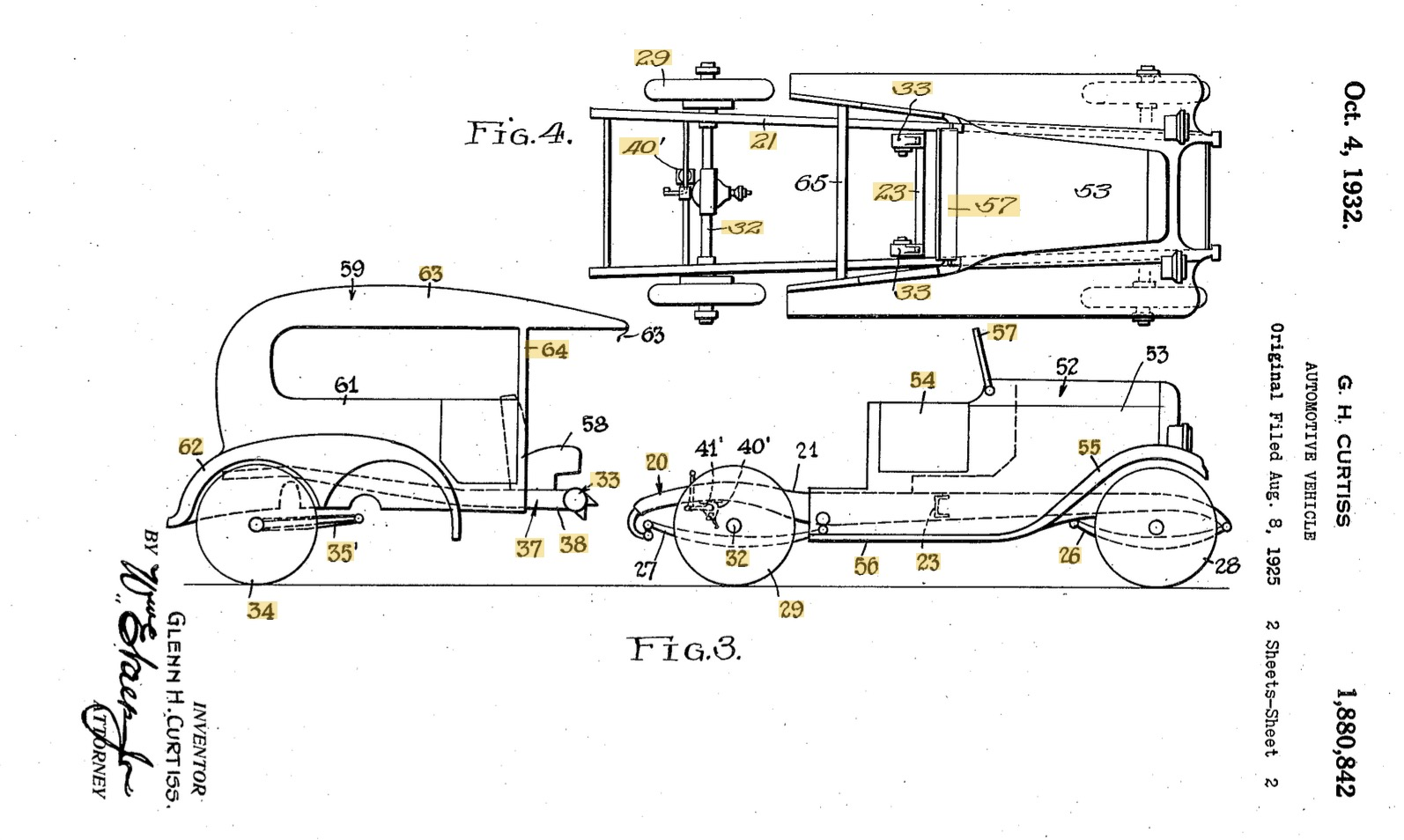
The Curtiss Automotive Vehicle patent of 1925 (US1880842)

In 1925 Curtiss shifted his automotive focus towards designs that improved passenger comfort and reduced road and engine noise and vibrations. He designed a triple-axle automobile with a rear passenger compartment articulated over the mid axle to isolate passengers from road and engine. It was called The Curtiss Automotive Vehicle and was patented after Curtiss' death (patent US1880842 filed on 8 August 1925 and approved on 4 October 1932). It is not known if this vehicle was built.

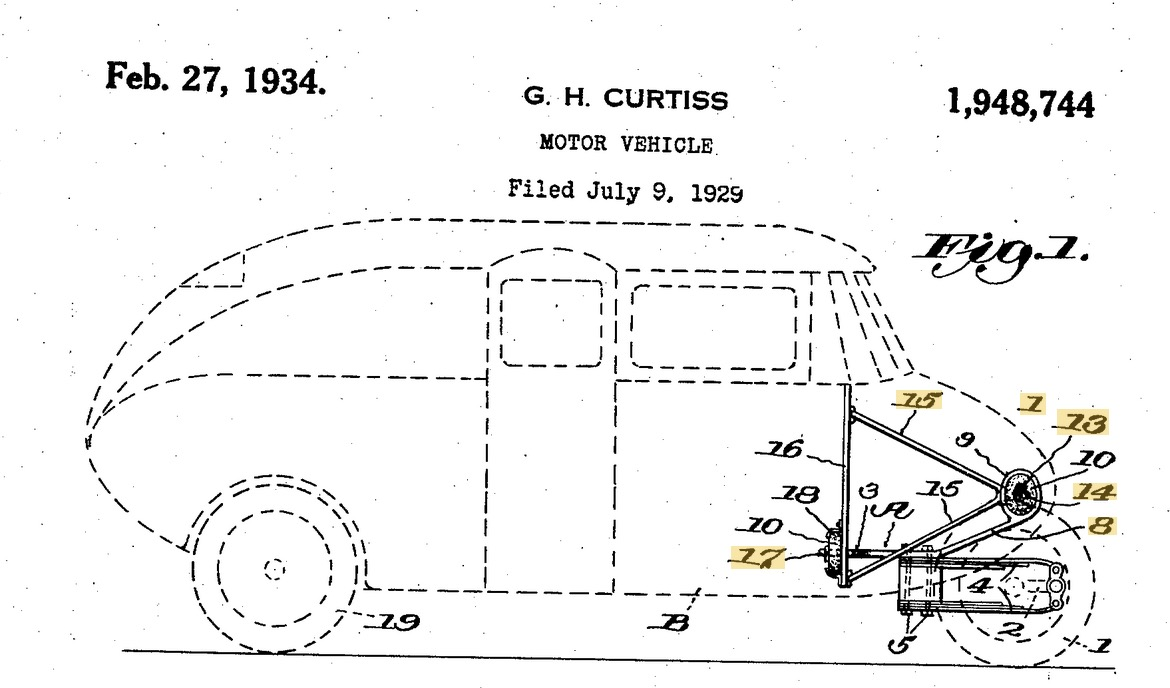
The Curtiss Motor Vehicle patent of 1929 (US1948744)

A Curtiss patent (US 1948744 filed on 9 July 1929 and approved on 27 February 1934) supported by archive material at the Glenn H. Curtiss Museum suggests that just before his death Curtiss conceived of a radical front-wheel drive "house car" (now motorhome) that would carry the Aerocar name. Called simply The Curtiss Motor Vehicle it was an early form of small but aerodynamic motorhome or camper van. Its one-box design pre-dated the 1950 Volkswagen Kombi by over 20 years. It included the articulated suspension of The Curtiss Automotive Vehicle but incorporated a smaller engine and larger passenger compartment. Only one rudimentary prototype is known to have been built.

== Legacy ==
The Aerocar was Curtiss' final technological achievement. It was the last member of a family of road vehicles designed by Curtiss to advance road vehicle comfort and safety. Curtiss' experience with building bicycles, motorcycles, aircraft, automobiles and trailers allowed him to apply technologies used in one form of transport to another. The Aerocar applied the fifth-wheel trailer concept used predominantly in the goods hauling industry for small business, public transport and recreational use. He applied aircraft construction methods to road vehicles including the Aerocar and was a pioneer of the automobile streamlining movement a decade before it became popular in 1930.

As the first fifth wheel production recreational vehicle, the Aerocar established a comfortable and safe way to travel that has since been taken up by millions. Over 53,000 fifth wheel trailers were shipped in the US in 2023.
