= Stencil machine =

Stencil machine may refer to:

- An early name for a mimeograph, also known as "stencil duplicator", a device for duplicating documents and pictures
- "Stencil machine", a contraption devised by Glenn Curtiss for stenciling numbers on paper strips
- Stencil cutter, a device to prepare stencils
