= Tod Shriver =

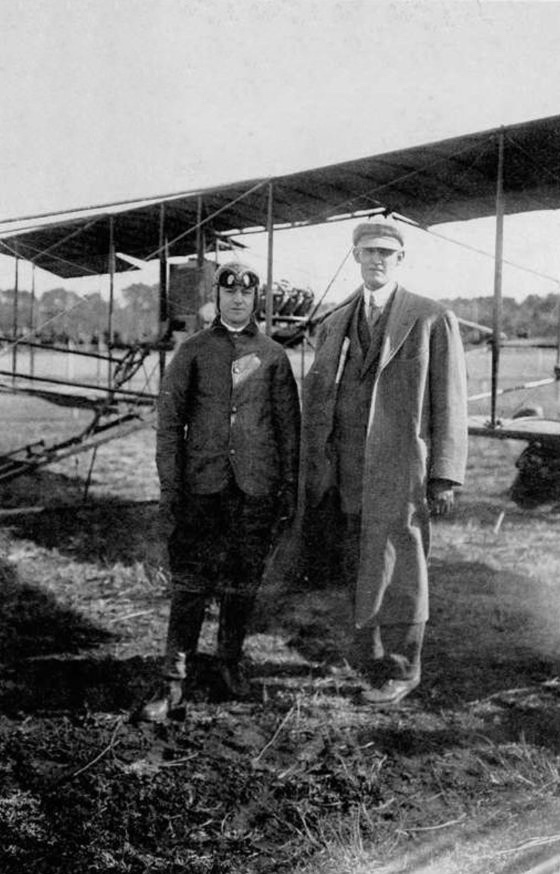
- James C. Mars and Tod Shriver, Japan 1911
- Born: Theodore Corwin Shriver; June 3, 1873; Manchester, Ohio (Adams County)
- Died: December 2, 1911 (aged 38); Ponce, Puerto Rico
- Other name: "Slim"
- Occupation: Aviator
- Years active: 1905-1911

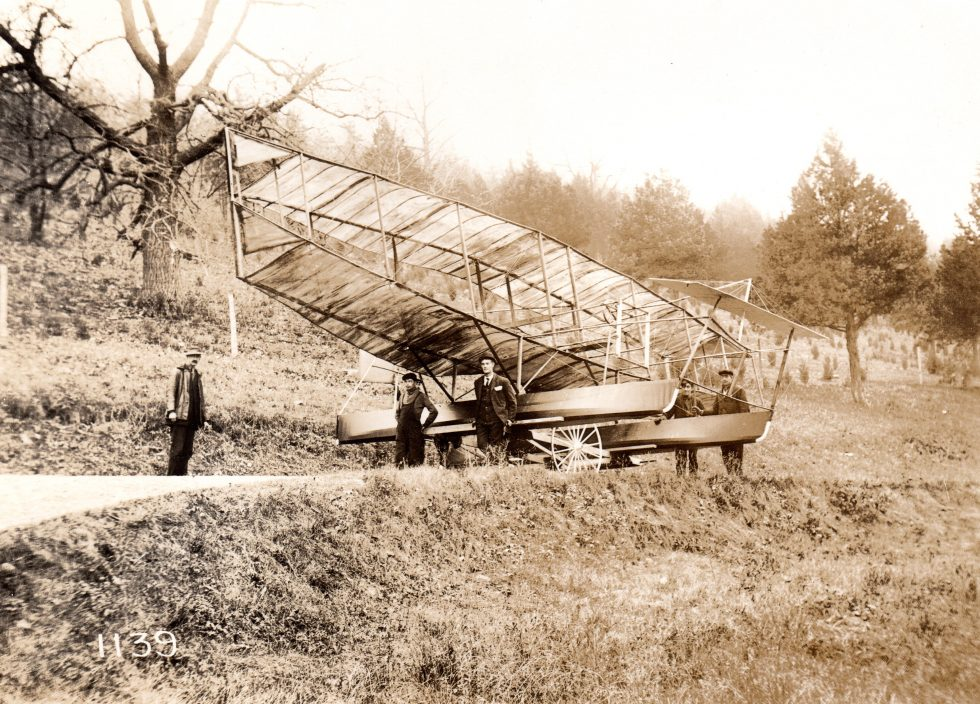
The Loon, the renamed Curtiss June Bug, with floats. Glenn Curtiss on left and Tod Shriver center in dark suit. November 1908

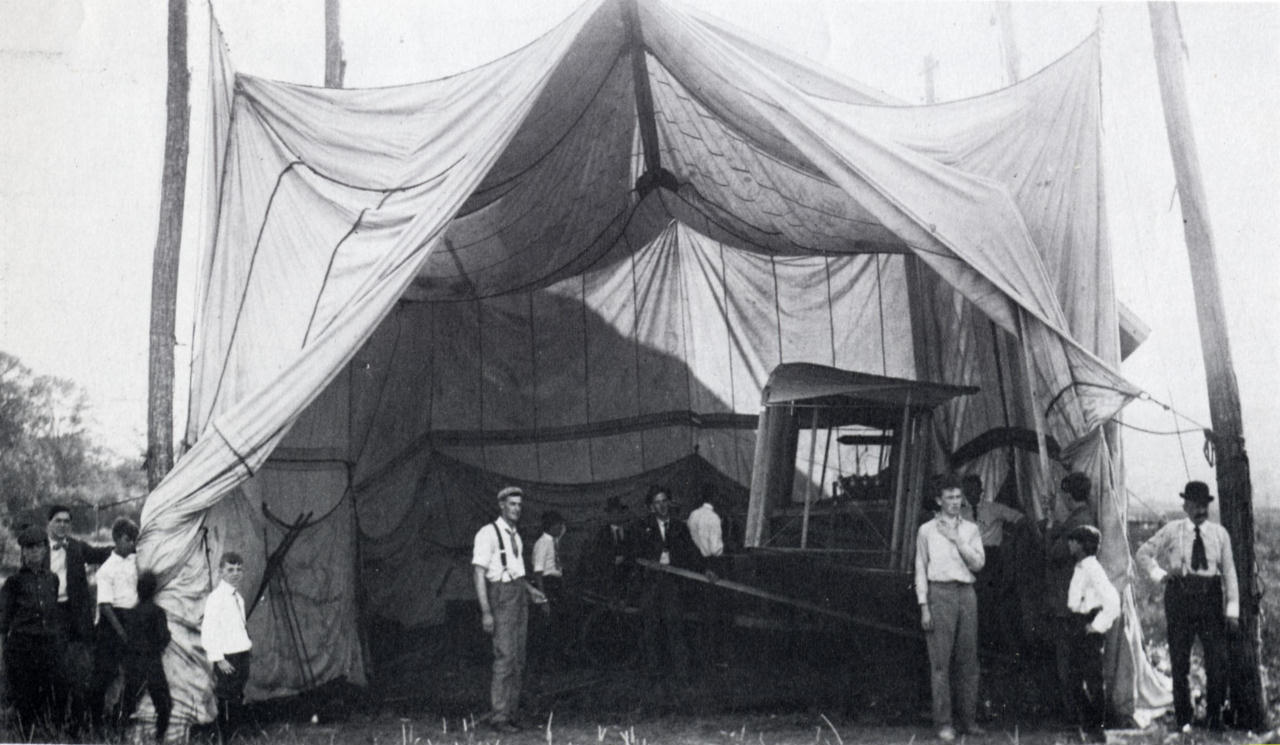
Assembling the Curtiss June Bug, June 1908. Shriver, employed by Curtiss, is seen in the entrance in cap and suspenders.

Tod Corwin Shriver (1873-1911) was a U.S. aviator and exhibition pilot often associated with pioneer Glenn Curtiss. Shriver was a mechanic for Glenn Curtiss, much in the way Charlie Taylor was for The Wright Brothers, and accompanied him to France in 1909 to participate in the historic Rheims air meet officially Grande Semaine d'Aviation de la Champagne. In motion picture footage of Curtiss and his Reims Racer in France, Shriver can be seen joking with Curtiss and others. The footage is preserved in the National Air and Space Museum. Shriver began his association in aviation working with balloonist Thomas Scott Baldwin and in 1906 was working in Curtiss's Hammondsport factory. Shriver in 1910 became a pilot himself on the classic Curtiss pusher type. He also built his own machine in the summer and flew it the first time he tried. He was widely traveled in the final year of his life accompanying Thomas Scott Baldwin and James C. Mars to Hawaii, The Philippines, Australia, China and Japan. Later he made flights in South America. In Puerto Rico he made what was probably the first flight on the island but was the first pilot to die there when his machine fell 200 feet into a sugar cane field.
