= James C. Mars =

American aviation pioneer (1875–1944)

James Cairn Mars
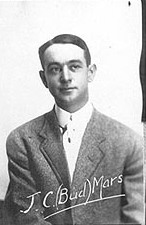
- Mars c. 1910
- Born: March 8, 1875; Grand Haven, Michigan, US
- Died: July 25, 1944 (aged 69); Los Angeles, California, US
- Occupations: Aviator, circus performer, airport operator, real estate
- Known for: Barnstormer, first pilot to fly an aircraft in Arkansas, Hawaii and in the Far East

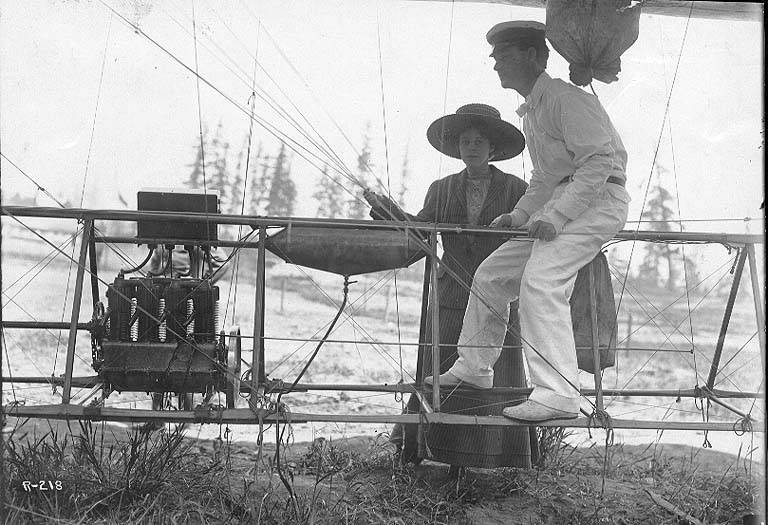
Mars aboard dirigible looked on by his wife

James Cairn Mars (March 8, 1875 - July 25, 1944), also known Bud Mars and the Curtiss Daredevil, was an aviation pioneer. He was the eleventh pilot licensed in the United States. As a balloonist, he was a student of Thomas Scott Baldwin, and as an airplane pilot, of Glenn Curtiss.

== Biography ==
Mars was born on March 8, 1875, in Grand Haven, Michigan.

On December 18, 1910, Mars made the longest plane glide on record when his carburetor froze at 4,000 feet (1,200 m) during an aviation meet in Fresno, California. His usual stunt glides were from 1,000 feet (300 m). "For the first time ... the band did not play on the descent of a birdman." He glided in a half-mile spiral to land safely. Glenn Curtiss also performed.

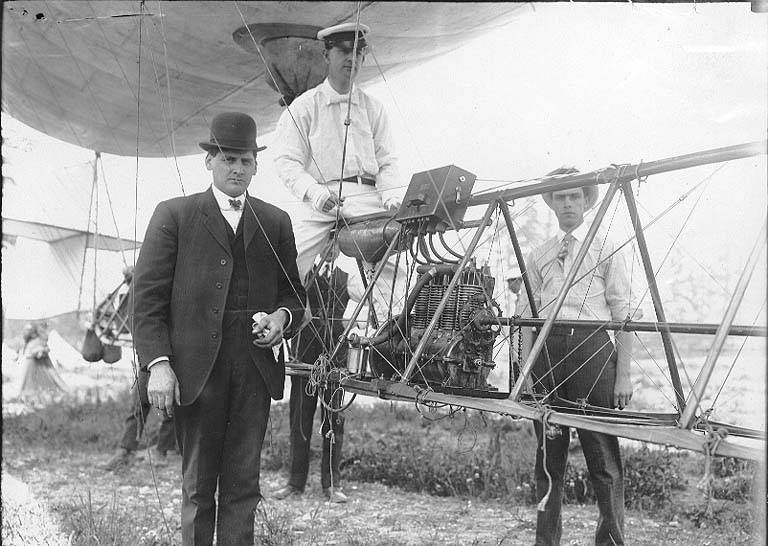
At the Alaska Yukon Pacific Exhibition in Seattle, 1909

On December 31, 1910, Mars made the first airplane flight in Hawaii on a Curtiss B18 biplane.

He was credited in 1911 with being the first pilot to bring aviation to the Far East, although flights had been made in both Japan and Vietnam in late 1910. Mars was the first to fly in both the Philippines and Korea.

While in Japan, he took Hirohito, future Emperor of Japan, on his first airplane flight.

Mars died on July 25, 1944, in Los Angeles, California.
