= Army and Navy Air Service Association =

U.S. nonprofit corporation

The Army and Navy Air Service Association was a United States non-profit corporation based in Washington, D.C. between 1919 and 1947 that functioned as an outside news and advocacy organization for the U.S. Army Air Service and the U.S. Naval Air Service. The organization published a newsletter, U.S. Air Services, from February, 1919, until December 1956. In 1942 the organization changed its name to the Air Services Publishing Company.
