= Glenn H. Curtiss Museum =

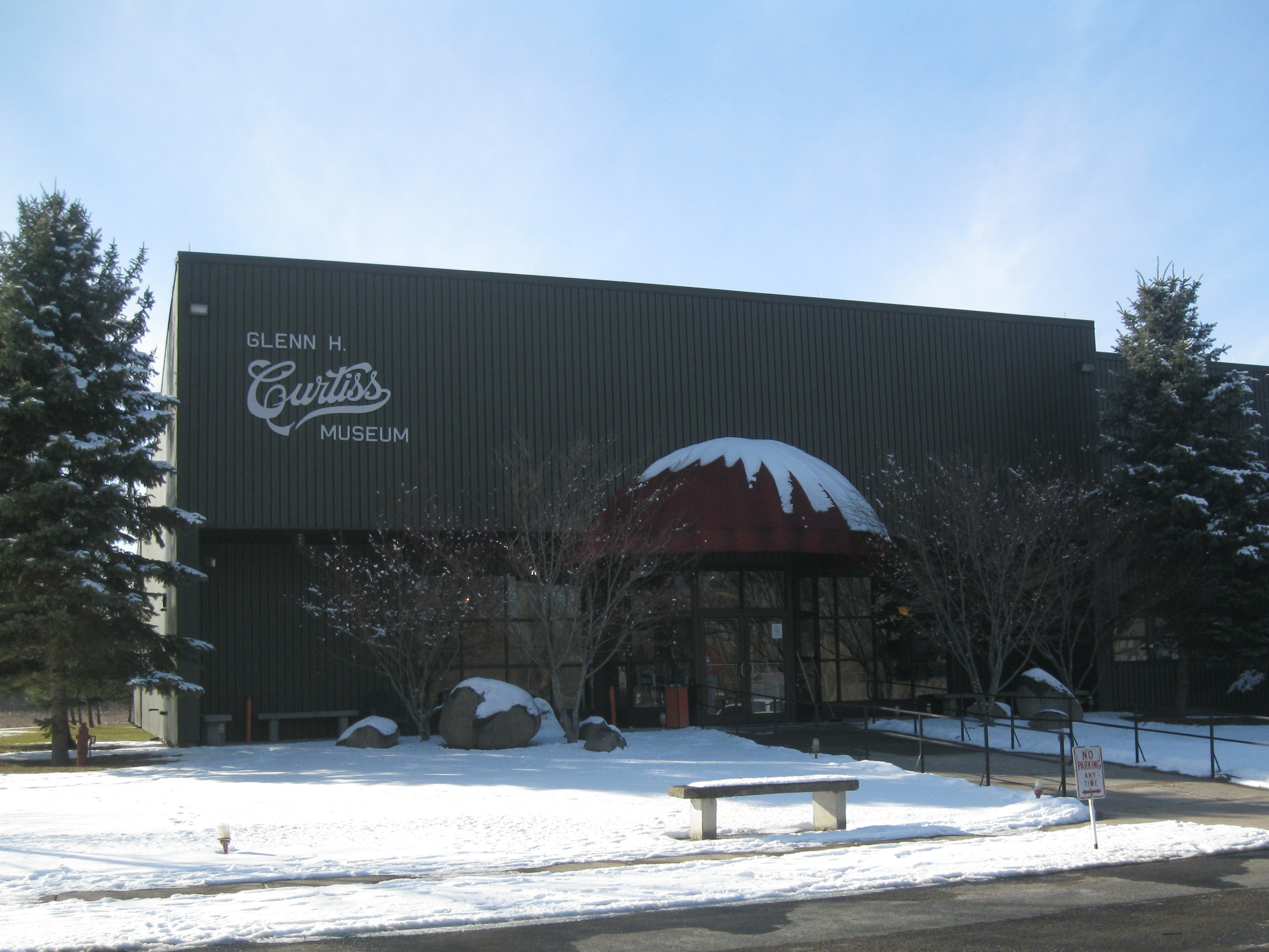
- Museum entrance

- Location within New York
- Established: 1962
- Location: Hammondsport, New York
- Coordinates: 42°23′54.76″N 77°13′58.52″W
- Type: Transportation museum
- Founder: Otto Kohl
- Website: glennhcurtissmuseum.org

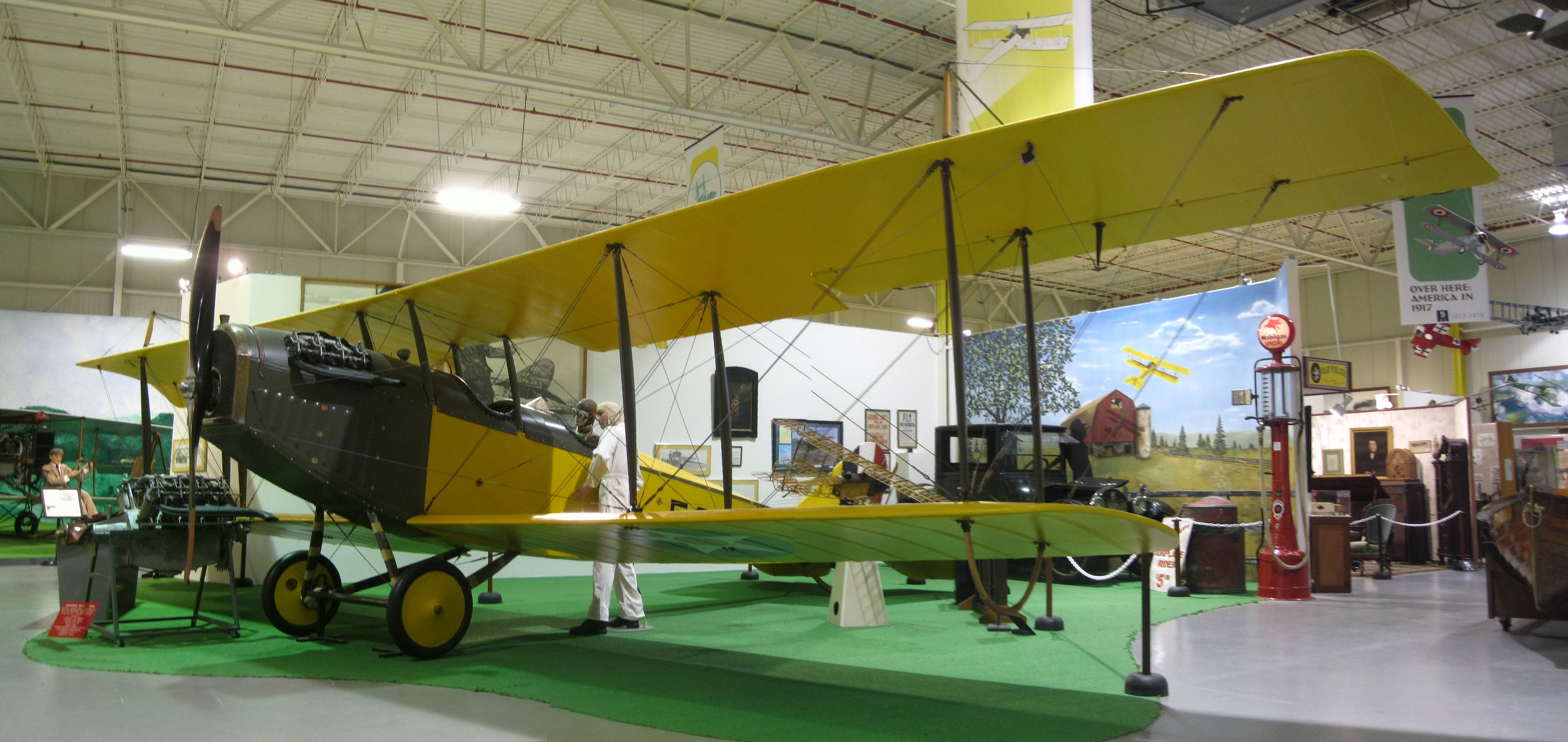
Curtiss JN-4 "Jenny" biplane in the museum

The Glenn H. Curtiss Museum is a transportation museum in Hammondsport, New York with a focus on the early aviator Glenn H. Curtiss. The 60,000 square foot facility has a collection of aircraft, vintage motorcycles, automobiles, and aircraft engines.

== History ==
The museum was founded in the summer of 1962 by Otto Kohl. It was originally located in a former high school. However, in 1992, the museum relocated to a former winery building south of Hammondsport.

== Collection ==
The museum contains over 20 aircraft, including AEA June Bug (reproduction), Curtiss Model D (reproduction), Curtiss Model E, "America" flying boat, JN-4D Jenny, Curtiss Model MF "Seagull", Curtiss Oriole, Curtiss Robin, C-46 Commando, three Mercury Aircraft, a 2/3 scale Curtiss P-40 Warhawk reproduction, and Curtiss-Wright Junior. The museum also displays 16 automobiles, the majority of which are on loan. Smaller collections include bicycles, wooden boats, and motorcycles.
