= U.S. Air Services =

American aeronautics magazine

U.S. Air Services (ISSN 1041-0473) was initially a weekly and then monthly American aeronautics magazine published from 1917 through 1956. Originally issued weekly (starting July 12, 1917) in New York as the U.S. Air Service Journal, as of 1920 (Vol. III) it was published monthly. Publication moved to Washington, D.C., by 1922, titled U.S. Air Service. The publisher was the Army and Navy Air Service Association, it was copyrighted by the Air Service Publishing Company.

The longtime editor was Earl N. Findlay (1878-1956). Indeed, the magazine only outlived him by six months after he died in mid-1956. Despite its military-sounding title (which only added the final "s" with Vol. IX in January 1924), the monthly's pages covered both civil and military aviation issues. Length of individual issues varied widely—from 50 pages or more in 1929 to as few as half that by the mid-1950s. U.S. Air Services was published until December 1956. (volume 41). Content most often included reprinted speeches or summaries of important reports, plus some original material, including short news stories and reviews of recent books. Full-page photos of newsworthy people and aircraft appeared regularly. The first several pages of each issue carried Findlay's informed editorials ranging over all aspects of (chiefly American) aviation. The magazine's motto was "Devoted to the development of aeronautics - civil and military - in the United States, birthplace of the flying machine, and throughout the world."

Probably to better meet needs of major advertisers, the magazine changed to a larger format (9 by 11-inch pages) in November 1927. Many advertisers purchased pages in the same place in each issue for years (Glenn L. Martin Co., for example, purchased the inside front cover, while Lockheed regularly took full-page ads to tout its latest navy fighter aircraft). The first color advertisements began to appear around 1940.

U.S. Air Services was popular among serious aviation aficionados, and copies were found in the Wright family library. Findlay's magazine was a staunch backer of Orville Wright's claim to have flown the first heavier-than-air craft (in December 1903) at a time when the Smithsonian Institution was still backing the earlier though forlorn flight efforts of Samuel Langley, its former Secretary.
