= Glenn Curtiss =

American aviator and industrialist (1878–1930)

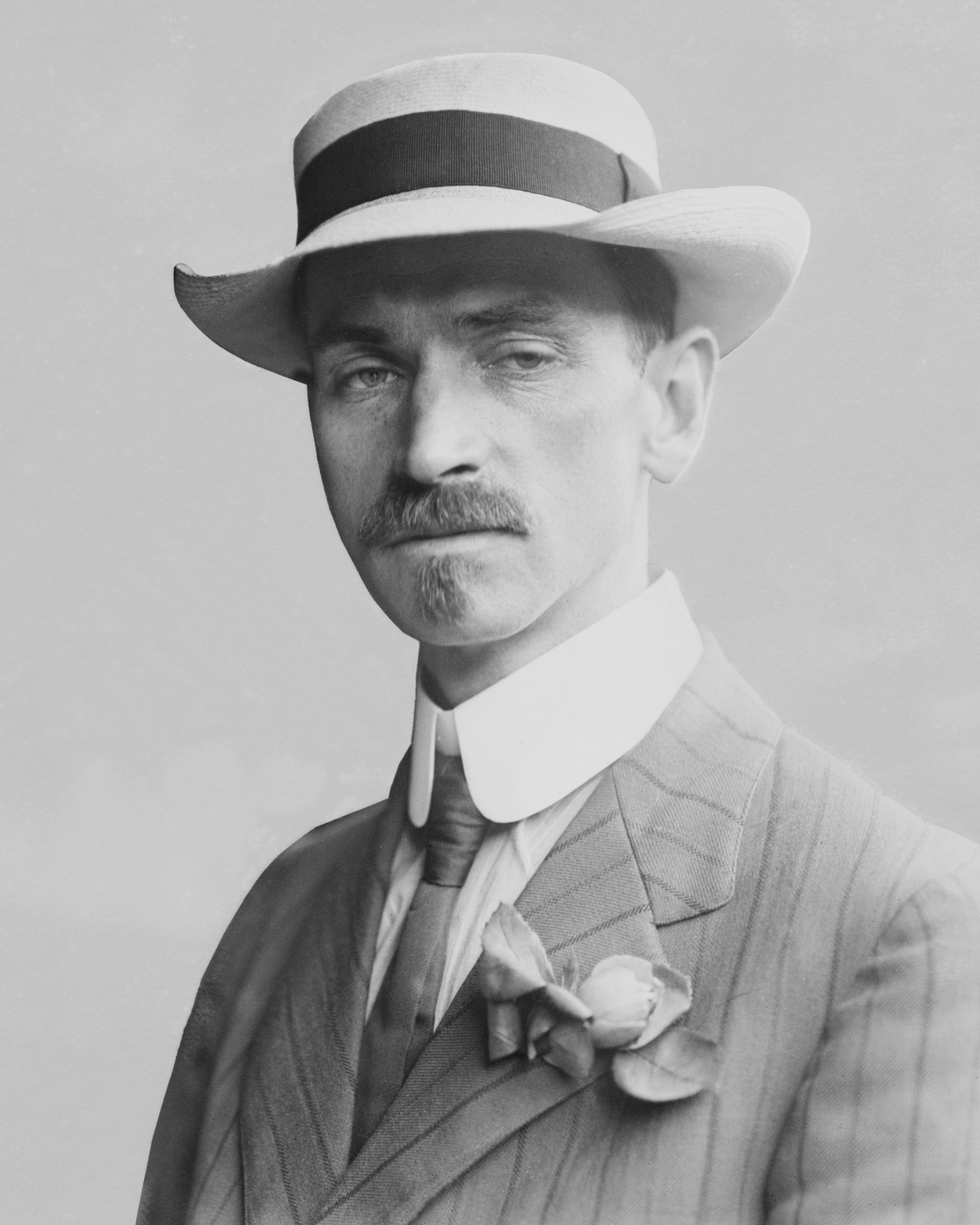
- Glenn Curtiss c. 1909
- Born: Glenn Hammond Curtiss; May 21, 1878; Hammondsport, New York, US
- Died: July 23, 1930 (aged 52); Buffalo, New York, US
- Occupations: Aviator; Company director
- Known for: Bicycle racing Motorcycle racing Air racing Naval aviation Flying boats Transatlantic flight Founder of the Curtiss Aeroplane and Motor Company
- Spouse: Lena Pearl Neff (March 7, 1898 – until his death)
- Children: 2

Glenn Hammond Curtiss (May 21, 1878 – July 23, 1930) was an American aviation and motorcycling pioneer, and a founder of the U.S. aircraft industry. He began his career as a bicycle racer and builder before moving on to motorcycles. As early as 1904, he began to manufacture engines for airships, and with his V8 engine in the Curtiss V-8 motorcycle, on January 24, 1907, Curtiss set an unofficial world speed record, for all kinds of vehicles, that was not broken until 1911.

In 1907, Curtiss joined the Aerial Experiment Association, a pioneering research group, founded by Alexander Graham Bell at Beinn Bhreagh, Nova Scotia, to build flying machines. On July 4, 1908, he flew nearly a mile with the AEA June Bug, recording the first public flight in North America. It won him the Scientific American prize, and also a lawsuit with the Wright Brothers, who had declined to fly in public.

In 1909, Curtiss won the Gordon Bennett Aviation Trophy at the world's first international air meet in France, the Grande Semaine d'Aviation de la Champagne. In 1910 he made the first long-distance flight in the U.S., across NY state. His contributions in designing and building aircraft, like the use of ailerons, led to the formation of the Curtiss Aeroplane and Motor Company, which later merged into the Curtiss-Wright Corporation. His company built aircraft for the U.S. Army and Navy, and, during the years leading up to World War I, his experiments with seaplanes led to advances in naval aviation. Curtiss civil and military aircraft were some of the most important types in the interwar and World War II eras.

== Early life ==
Glenn Curtiss was born in 1878 in Hammondsport, New York, situated on the southern tip of Keuka Lake, one of the Finger Lakes in New York. His mother was Lua Curtiss née Andrews and his father was Frank Richmond Curtiss, a harness maker who had arrived in Hammondsport with Glenn's grandparents in 1876. Glenn's paternal grandparents were Claudius G. Curtiss, a Methodist Episcopal clergyman, and Ruth Bramble. Glenn Curtiss had a younger sister, Rutha Luella, also born in Hammondsport.

Although his formal education extended only to eighth grade, his early interest in mechanics and inventions was evident at his first job at the Eastman Dry Plate and Film Company (later Eastman Kodak Company) in Rochester, New York. His job at the factory was to stencil numbers on the paper backing of the film manufactured by the company. He figured out how to speed up the process of stenciling and built a "stencil machine": a rack with a brush on a hinge which would stencil one hundred paper strips with a single stroke of the brush. This improved his throughput ten times, and eventually the company adopted his invention.

Curtiss also built a rudimentary camera to study photography.

== Bicycles and motorcycles ==
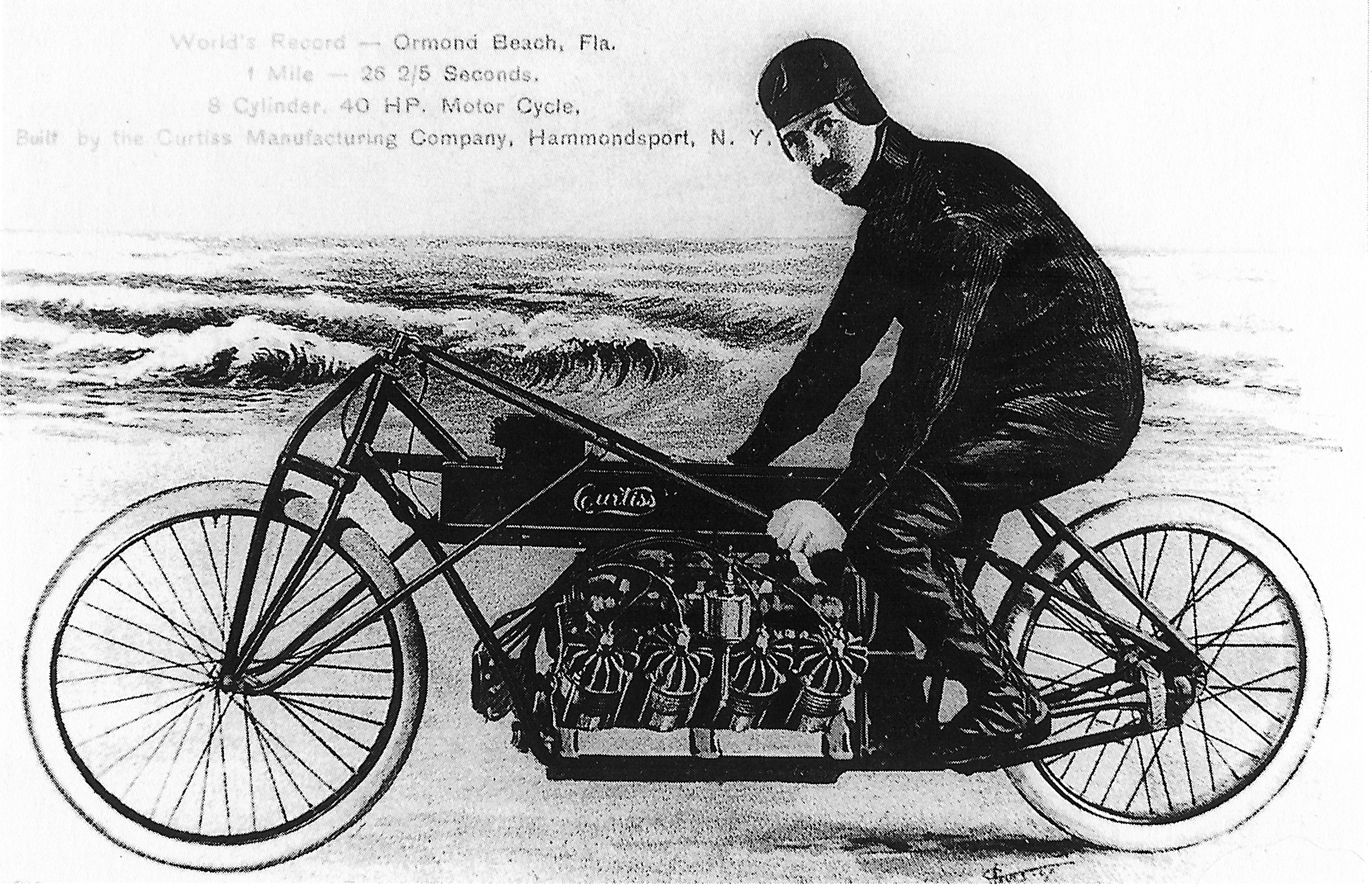
Glenn Curtiss on his V-8 motorcycle in 1907

Curtiss began his career as a Western Union bicycle messenger, a bicycle racer, and bicycle-shop owner. In 1901, he developed an interest in motorcycles when internal combustion engines became more available. In 1902, Curtiss began manufacturing motorcycles with his own single-cylinder engines. His first motorcycle's carburetor was adapted from a tomato soup can containing a gauze screen to pull the gasoline up by capillary action. In 1903, he set a motorcycle land speed record at 64 miles per hour (103 km/h) for one mile (1.6 km). When E.H. Corson of the Hendee Mfg Co (manufacturers of Indian motorcycles) visited Hammondsport in July 1904, he was amazed that the entire Curtiss motorcycle enterprise was located in the back room of the modest "shop". Corson's motorcycles had just been trounced the week before by "Hell Rider" Curtiss in an endurance race from New York to Cambridge, Maryland.

On January 24, 1907, Curtiss set an unofficial world record of 136.36 miles per hour (219.45 km/h), on a 40 horsepower (30 kW) 269 cu in (4,410 cc) V-8-powered motorcycle of his own design and construction in Ormond Beach, Florida. The air-cooled F-head engine was intended for use in aircraft. He remained "the fastest man in the world", the title the newspapers gave him, until the Blitzen Benz in 1911, and his motorcycle record was not broken until 1930. This motorcycle is now in the Smithsonian Institution. Curtiss's success at racing strengthened his reputation as a leading maker of high-performance motorcycles and engines.

== Aviation pioneer ==
=== Curtiss, motor expert ===
In 1904, Curtiss became a supplier of engines for the California "aeronaut" Tom Baldwin, who inspired Curtiss to pursue aviation. In that same year, Baldwin's California Arrow, powered by a Curtiss 9 HP V-twin motorcycle engine, became the first successful dirigible in America.

In 1907, Alexander Graham Bell invited Curtiss to develop a suitable engine (Curtiss B-8) for heavier-than-air flight experimentation. Bell regarded Curtiss as "the greatest motor expert in the country" and invited Curtiss to join his Aerial Experiment Association (AEA).

=== AEA aircraft experiments ===
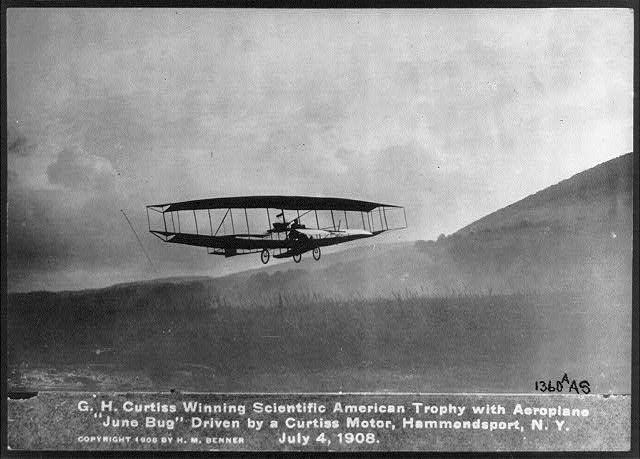
The June Bug on its prize-winning historic flight with Curtiss at the controls

Between 1908 and 1910, the AEA produced four aircraft, each one an improvement over the last. Curtiss primarily designed the AEA's third aircraft, Aerodrome #3, the famous June Bug, and became its test pilot, undertaking most of the proving flights. On July 4, 1908, he flew 5,080 ft (1,550 m) to win the Scientific American Trophy and its $2,500 prize. This is considered to be the first pre-announced public flight of a heavier-than-air flying machine in America. The flight of the June Bug propelled Curtiss and aviation firmly into public awareness. On June 8, 1911, Curtiss received U.S. Pilot's License #1 from the Aero Club of America, because the first batch of licenses were issued in alphabetical order; Wilbur Wright received license #5. At the culmination of the Aerial Experiment Association's experiments, Curtiss offered to purchase the rights to Aerodrome #3, essentially using it as the basis of his Curtiss No. 1, the first of his production series of pusher aircraft.

=== The pre-war years ===
==== Aviation competitions ====
After a 1909 fall-out with the AEA, Curtiss joined with A. M. Herring (and backers from the Aero Club of America) to found the Herring-Curtiss Company in Hammondsport. During the 1909–1910 period, Curtiss employed a number of demonstration pilots, including Eugene Ely, Charles K. Hamilton, J. A. D. McCurdy, Augustus Post, and Hugh Robinson. Another pilot, Tod Shriver, was employed by Curtiss in his factory as early as 1906. Shriver played a similar role for Curtiss that Charlie Taylor had served for the Wright Brothers, seeing to the factory and being all around shop foreman; he later went with Curtiss to France where the latter won the speed competitions. Aerial competitions and demonstration flights across North America helped to introduce aviation to a curious public; Curtiss took full advantage of these occasions to promote his products.

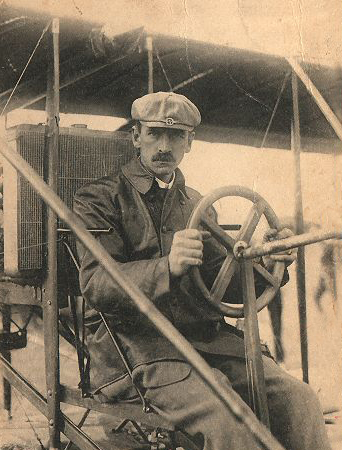
Souvenir postcard of the Grande Semaine d'Aviation, 1909

In August 1909, Curtiss took part in the Grande Semaine d'Aviation de la Champagne aviation meeting at Reims, France, organized by the Aéro-Club de France, and sponsored by Gordon Bennett, publisher of the New York Herald. The Wrights, who were selling their machines to customers in Germany at the time, decided not to compete in person. Several Wright Model A customer aircraft (modified with a landing gear) were at the meet, but they did not win any events. On August 28, 1909, flying his No. 2 biplane, Curtiss won the overall speed event, the Gordon Bennett Cup, completing the 20-km (12.5-mile) course in just under 16 minutes at a speed of 46.5 mph (74.8 km/h), six seconds faster than runner-up Louis Blériot. (Note: Curtiss was awarded French pilot's license No. 2 as a tribute to his Gordon Bennett Cup victory. Blériot held No. 1 and Léon Delagrange No. 3, as the first 16 certificates of the Aero Club de France were retrospectively numbered on December 4, 1909, in alphabetical order.)

On May 29, 1910, Curtiss flew from Albany to New York City to make the first long-distance flight between two major cities in the U.S. For this 137-mile (220 km) flight, which he completed in just under four hours including one stop to refuel, he won a $10,000 prize offered by publisher Joseph Pulitzer and was awarded permanent possession of the Scientific American Trophy. His flight was followed by a photographer on a special train chartered by The New York Times, which covered the venture by the "dapper daredevil" with their first front-page photograph, showing Curtiss’s takeoff from the outskirts of Albany, and six pages inside the issue.

In June 1910, Curtiss provided a simulated bombing demonstration to naval officers at Hammondsport. Two months later, Lt. Jacob E. Fickel demonstrated the feasibility of shooting at targets on the ground from an aircraft with Curtiss serving as pilot. One month later, in September, he trained Blanche Stuart Scott, who was possibly the first American woman pilot. The fictional character Tom Swift, who first appeared in 1910 in Tom Swift and His Motor Cycle and Tom Swift and His Airship, has been said to have been based on Glenn Curtiss. The Tom Swift books are set in a small town on a lake in upstate New York.

=== Patent dispute ===
A patent lawsuit by the Wright Brothers against Curtiss in 1909 continued until it was resolved during World War I. Since the last Wright aircraft, the Wright Model L, was a single prototype of a "scouting" aircraft, made in 1916, the U.S. government, desperately short of combat aircraft, pressured both firms to resolve the dispute. Of nine suits Wright brought against Curtiss and others and the three suits brought against them, the Wright Brothers eventually won every case in courts in the United States.

=== Naval aviation ===
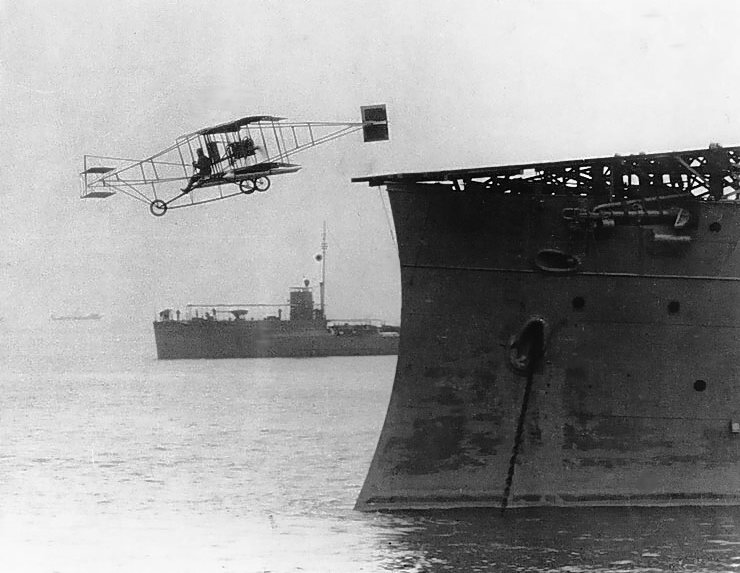
Pilot Eugene Ely takes off from USS Birmingham, Hampton Roads, Virginia, November 14, 1910

On November 14, 1910, Curtiss demonstration pilot Eugene Ely took off from a temporary platform mounted on the forward deck of the cruiser USS Birmingham. His successful takeoff and ensuing flight to shore marked the beginning of a relationship between Curtiss and the Navy that remained significant for decades. At the end of 1910, Curtiss established a winter encampment at San Diego to teach flying to Army and Naval personnel, effectively the first military aviation school. His trainees included Lt. Theodore Ellyson, who became U.S. Naval Aviator #1, and three Army officers, 1st Lt. Paul W. Beck, 2nd Lt. George E. M. Kelly, and 2nd Lt. John C. Walker Jr., and 1912 graduate Chikuhei Nakajima, founder of Nakajima Aircraft Company. The original site of this winter encampment is now part of Naval Air Station North Island and is referred to by the Navy as "The Birthplace of Naval Aviation".

Through the course of that winter, Curtiss was able to develop a float (pontoon) design that enabled him to take off and land on water. On January 26, 1911, he flew the first seaplane from the water in the United States. Demonstrations of this advanced design were of great interest to the Navy, but more significant, as far as the Navy was concerned, was Eugene Ely successfully landing his Curtiss pusher (the same aircraft used to take off from the Birmingham) on a makeshift platform mounted on the rear deck of the armored cruiser USS Pennsylvania. This was the first arrester-cable landing on a ship and the precursor of modern-day carrier operations. On January 28, 1911, Ellyson took off in a Curtiss "grass cutter" to become the first Naval aviator.

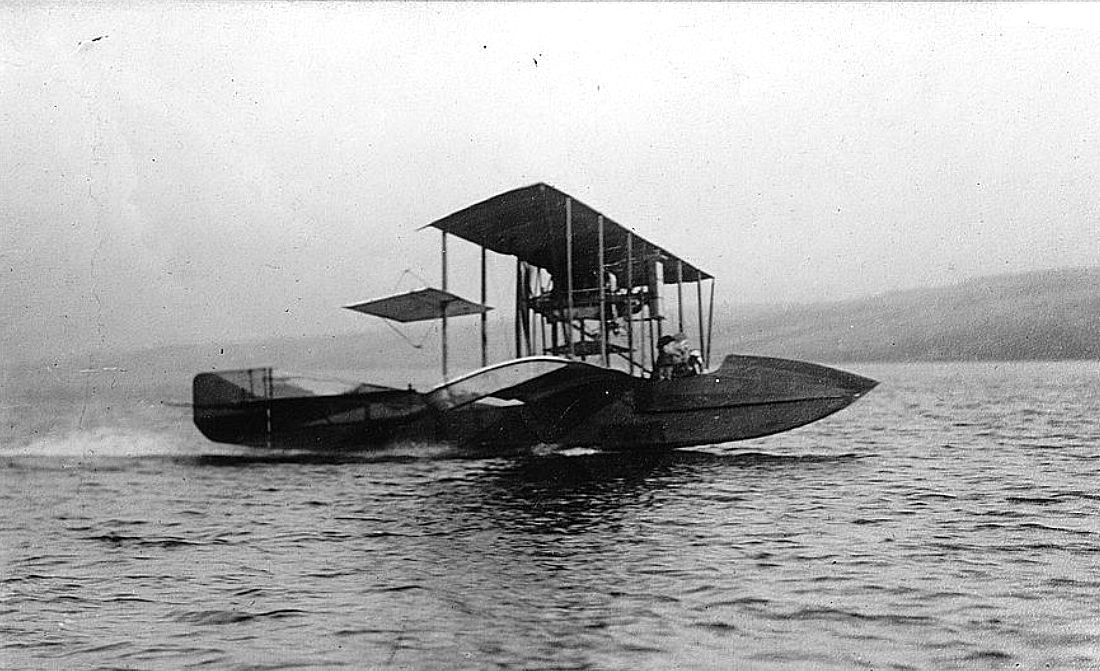
Curtiss flying boat being tested on Keuka Lake, New York (c. 1910–1915)

Curtiss custom built floats and adapted them onto a Model D so it could take off and land on water to prove the concept. On February 24, 1911, Curtiss made his first amphibious demonstration at North Island by taking off and alighting on both land and water. Back in Hammondsport, six months later in July 1911, Curtiss sold the U.S. Navy their first aircraft, the A-1 Triad (Curtiss Model E). The A-1, which was primarily a seaplane, was equipped with retractable wheels, also making it the first amphibious aircraft. Curtiss trained the Navy's first pilots and built their first aircraft. For this, he is considered in the US to be "The Father of Naval Aviation". The Triad was immediately recognized as so obviously useful, it was purchased by the U.S. Navy, Russia, Japan, Germany, and Britain. Curtiss won the Collier Trophy for designing this aircraft.

Henry Kleckler, considered Curtiss's "right hand man", and a "master innovator and mechanic", was also a native of Hammondsport and worked with Curtiss in developing more efficient engines for the "flying boats" pioneered and developed by Curtiss.

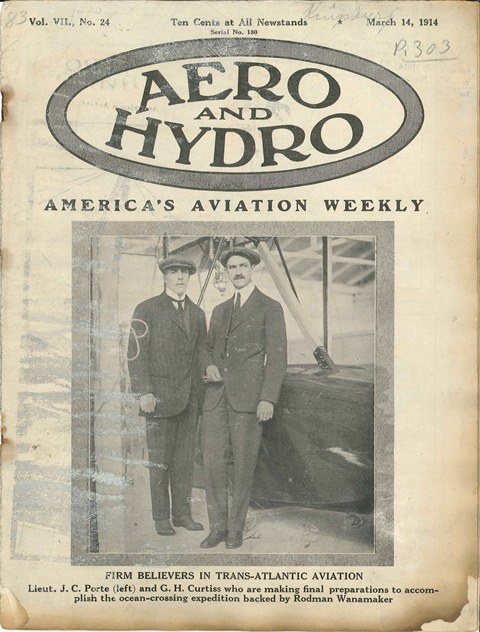
"Firm Believers in Trans-Atlantic Aviation", Porte and Curtiss on the cover of Aero and Hydro, March 14, 1914

Around this time, Curtiss met retired British naval officer John Cyril Porte, who was looking for a partner to produce an aircraft with him to win the Daily Mail prize for the first transatlantic crossing. In 1912, Curtiss produced the two-seat Flying Fish, a larger craft that became classified as a flying boat because the hull sat in the water; it featured an innovative notch (known as a "step") in the hull that Porte recommended for breaking clear of the water at takeoff. Curtiss correctly surmised that this configuration was more suited to building a larger long-distance craft that could operate from water, and was also more stable when operating from a choppy surface. With the backing of Rodman Wanamaker, Porte and Curtiss produced the America in 1914, a larger flying boat with two engines, for the transatlantic crossing.

=== Langley deception ===
Curtiss, working with the head of the Smithsonian Institution Charles Walcott, sought to discredit the Wrights and rehabilitate the reputation of Samuel Langley, a former head of the Smithsonian, who failed in his attempt at powered flight. Secretly, Curtiss extensively modified Langley's 1903 aerodrome (aircraft) then demonstrated in 1914 that it could fly. In turn, the Smithsonian endorsed the false statement that "Professor Samuel P. Langley had actually designed and built the first man-carrying flying machine capable of sustained flight." Walcott ordered the plane modified by Curtiss to be returned to its original 1903 condition before going on display at the Smithsonian to cover up the deception. In 1928, the Smithsonian Board of Regents reversed its position and acknowledged that the Wright Brothers deserved the credit for the first flight.

== World War I and later ==
=== World War I ===
With the start of World War I, Porte returned to service in the Royal Navy, which subsequently purchased several models of the America, then called the H-4, from Curtiss. Porte licensed and further developed the designs, constructing a range of Felixstowe long-range patrol aircraft, and from his experience passed along improvements to the hull to Curtiss. The later British designs were sold to the U.S. forces, or built by Curtiss as the F5L. The Curtiss factory also built a total of 68 "Large Americas", which evolved into the H-12, the only American designed and built aircraft to see combat in World War I.

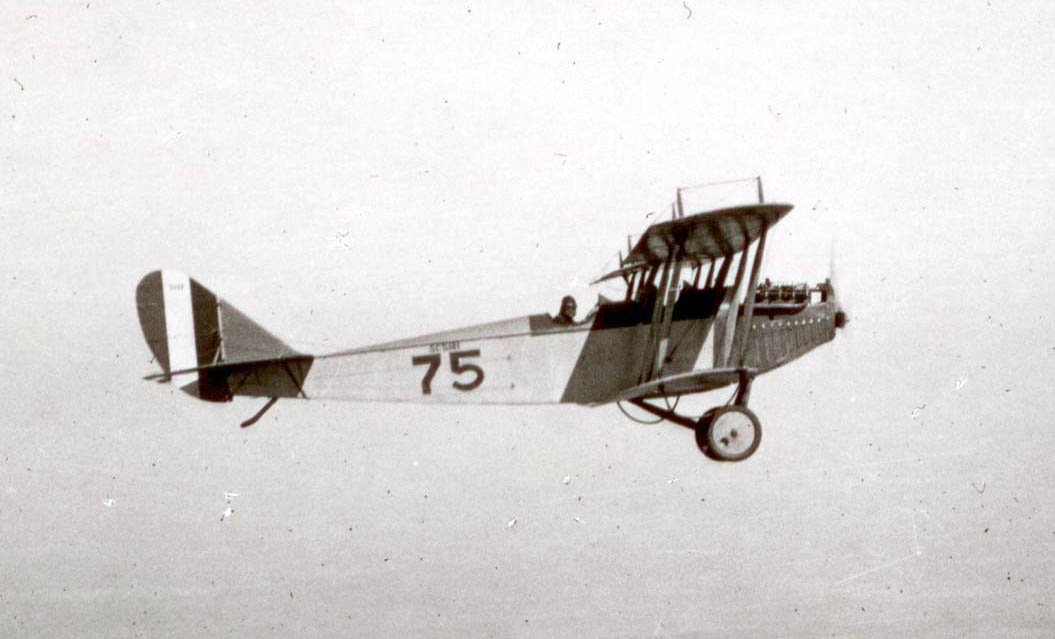
A Curtiss JN-4 (Jenny) on a training flight during World War I

As 1916 approached, the United States was feared to be drawn into the conflict. The Army's Aviation Section, U.S. Signal Corps ordered the development of a simple, easy-to-fly-and-maintain, two-seat trainer. Curtiss created the JN-4 "Jenny" for the Army, and the N-9 seaplane version for the Navy, designed as a trainer. They were some of the most famous products of the Curtiss company, and thousands were sold to the militaries of the United States, Canada, and Britain. Civilian and military aircraft demand boomed, and the company grew to employ 18,000 workers in Buffalo and 3,000 workers in Hammondsport.

In 1917, the U.S. Navy commissioned Curtiss to design a long-range, four-engined flying boat large enough to hold a crew of five, which became known as the Curtiss NC. Three of the four NC flying boats built attempted a transatlantic crossing in 1919. Thus NC-4 became the first aircraft to be flown across the Atlantic Ocean (a feat quickly overshadowed by the Daily Mail prize-winning first non-stop Atlantic crossing from any point on North America to any point in the British Isles by Alcock and Brown), while NC-1 and NC-3 were unable to continue past the Azores. NC-4 is now on permanent display in the National Museum of Naval Aviation in Pensacola, Florida.

=== Post-World War I ===
Peace brought cancellation of wartime contracts. In September 1920, the Curtiss Aeroplane and Motor Company underwent a financial reorganization. Glenn Curtiss cashed out his stock in the company for $32 million and retired to Florida. He continued on as a director of the company, but served only as an adviser on design. Clement M. Keys gained control of the company, which later became the nucleus of a large group of aviation companies.

=== Later years ===
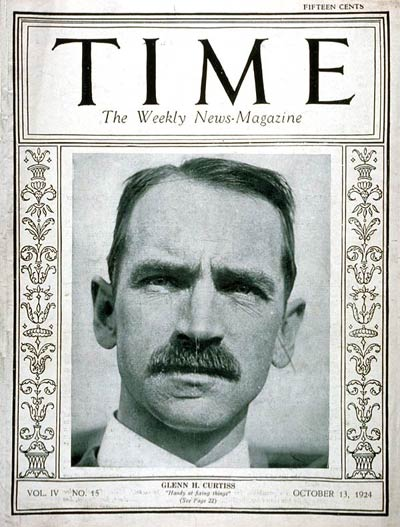
Time cover, October 13, 1924

Curtiss and his family moved to Florida in the 1920s, where he founded 18 corporations, served on civic commissions, and donated extensive land and water rights. He co-developed the city of Hialeah with James Bright and developed the cities of Opa-locka and Miami Springs, where he built a family home, known variously as the Miami Springs Villas House, Dar-Err-Aha, MSTR No. 2, or Glenn Curtiss House. The home, after years of disrepair and frequent vandalism, is being refurbished to serve as a museum in his honor.

His frequent hunting trips into the Florida Everglades led to a final invention, the Adams Motor "Bungalo", a forerunner of the modern recreational vehicle trailer (named after his business partner and half-brother, G. Carl Adams). Curtiss later developed this into a larger, more elaborate fifth-wheel vehicle, which he manufactured and sold under the name Aerocar. Shortly before his death, he designed a tailless aircraft with a V-shaped wing and tricycle landing gear that he hoped could be sold in the price range of a family car.

Shortly before Curtiss's death, the Wright Aeronautical Corporation, a successor to the original Wright Company, merged on July 5, 1929, with the Curtiss Aeroplane and Motor Company, forming Curtiss-Wright.

== Personal life ==
On March 7, 1898, Curtiss married Lena Pearl Neff (1879–1951), daughter of Guy L. Neff and Jenny M. Potter, in Hammondsport, New York. They had two children: Carlton N. Curtiss (1901–1902) and Glenn Hammond Curtiss (1912–1969).

== Death ==
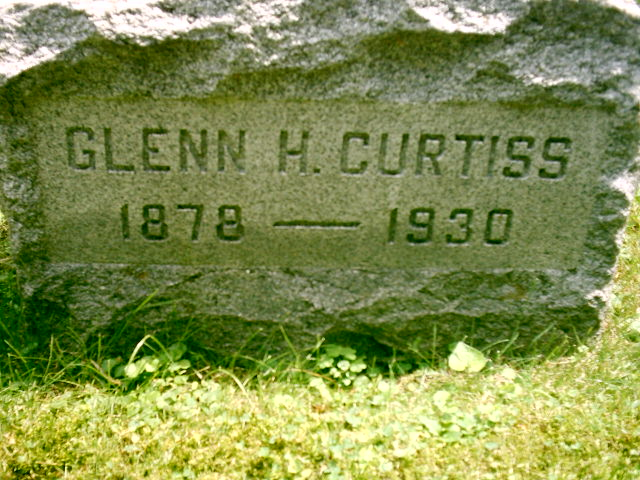
Curtiss's tombstone

Traveling to Rochester, New York, to contest a lawsuit brought by former business partner August Herring, Curtiss suffered an attack of appendicitis in court. He died on July 23, 1930, at age 52, in Buffalo, of complications from an appendectomy. His funeral service was held at St. James Episcopal Church in his home town, Hammondsport, with interment in the family plot at Pleasant Valley Cemetery in Hammondsport.

== Awards and honors ==
By an act of Congress on March 1, 1933, Curtiss was posthumously awarded the Distinguished Flying Cross, which now resides in the Smithsonian Institution. Curtiss was inducted into the National Aviation Hall of Fame in 1964, the International Aerospace Hall of Fame in 1965, the Motorsports Hall of Fame of America in 1990, the Motorcycle Hall of Fame in 1998, and the National Inventors Hall of Fame in 2003. The Smithsonian's National Air and Space Museum has a collection of Curtiss's original documents as well as a collection of airplanes, motorcycles and motors. LaGuardia Airport was originally called Glenn H. Curtiss Airport when it began operation in 1929.

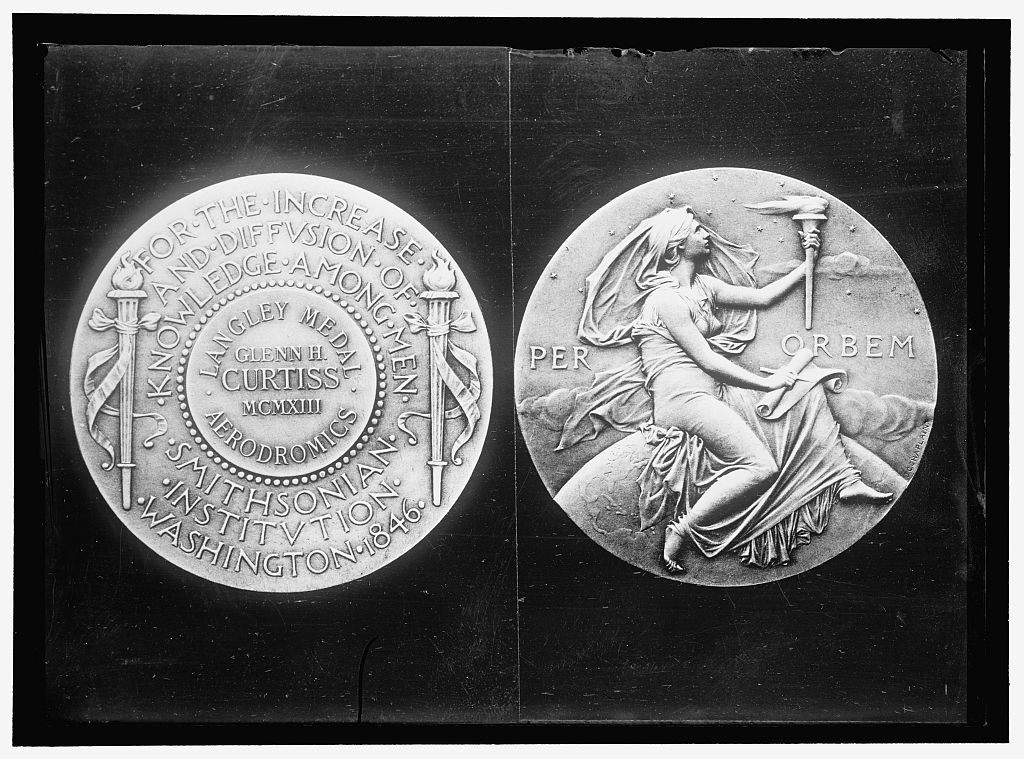
The 1913 Langley Medal awarded to Glenn Curtiss

Other Curtiss honors include: Naval Aviation Hall of Honor; OX-5 Aviation Pioneers Hall of Fame; Empire State Aviation Hall of Fame; Niagara Frontier Aviation and Space Hall of Fame; International Air & Space Hall of Fame; Long Island Air & Space Hall of Fame; Great Floridians 2000; Steuben County (New York) Hall of Fame; Hammondsport School Lifetime Achievements Wall of Fame; Florida Aviation Hall of Fame; Smithsonian Institution Langley Medal; Top 100 Stars of Aerospace and Aviation; Doctor of Science (honoris causa), University of Miami.

The Glenn H. Curtiss Museum in Hammondsport is dedicated to Curtiss's life and work.

Curtiss's famed airplane appeared on a 1918 issue US airmail stamp. along with fifteen other US airmail stamps, (including the first air mail stamps), and on the stamps of at least 17 other countries. Curtiss himself appeared on the cover of Time in 1924.

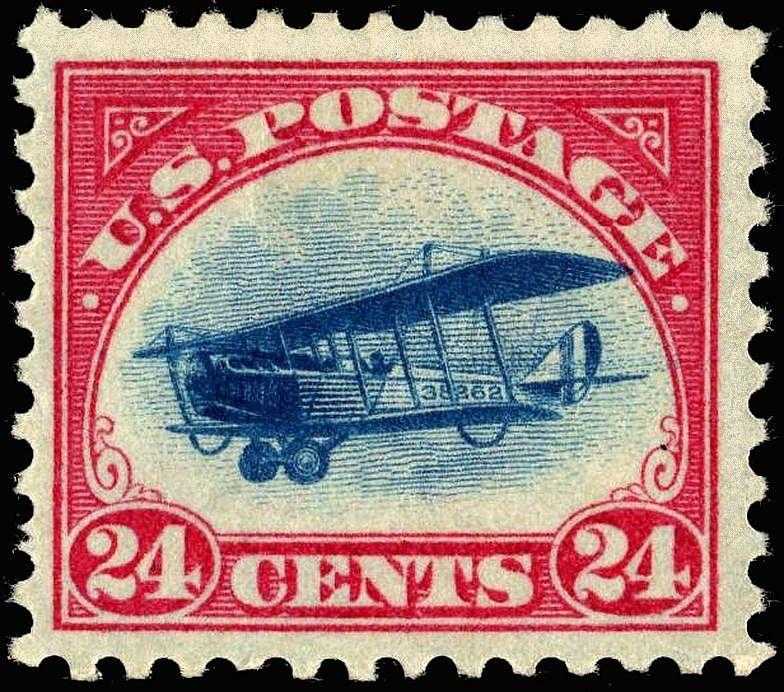
Curtis-Jenny plane depicted on a 1918 issue US postage stamp

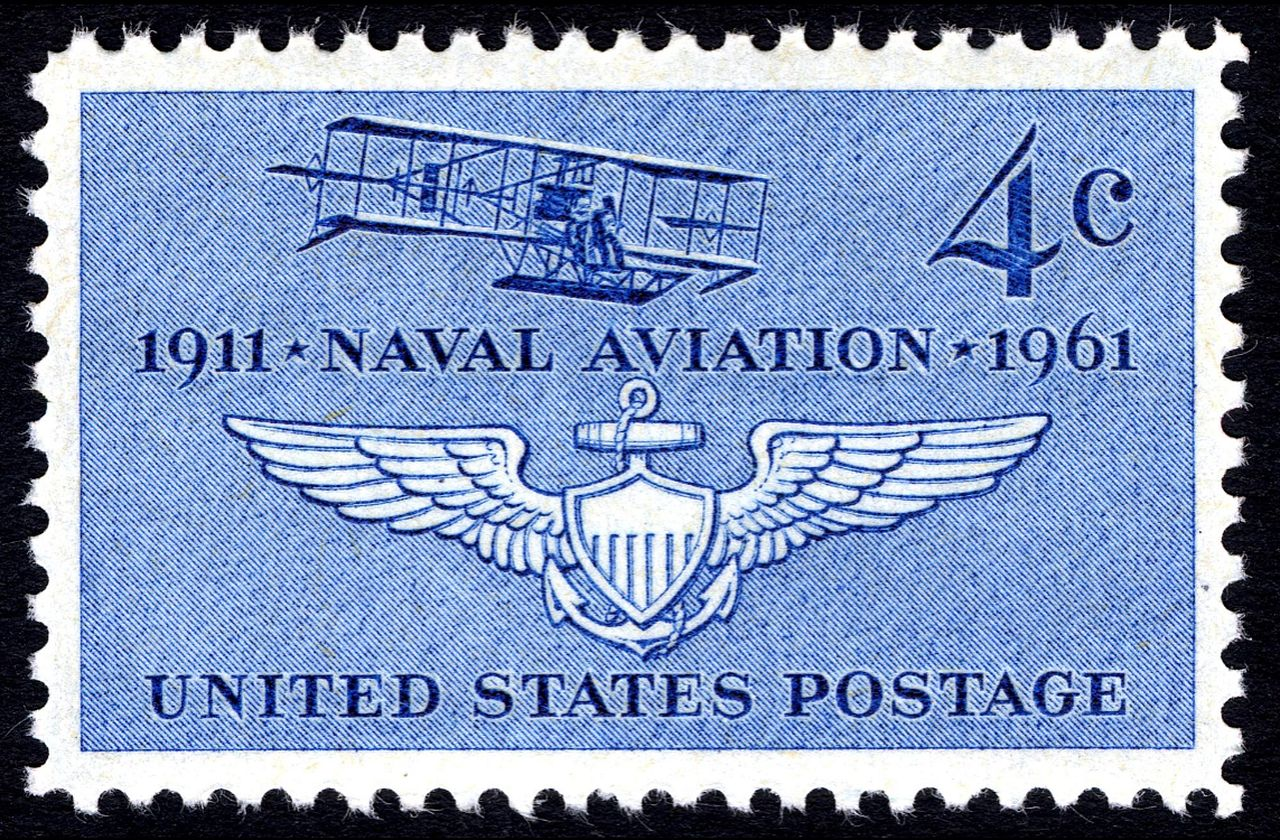
50th anniversary issue, 1961, featuring the Curtiss A1, first airplane used by the US Navy

There is a Curtiss Avenue in Hammondsport, New York, and Glenn Curtiss Elementary School. Carson, California, has Glenn Hammond Curtiss Middle School and Glenn Curtiss Street. Glenn H. Curtiss Road is in San Diego, California, and Glenn Curtiss Boulevard is in East Meadow/Uniondale, New York (Long Island). Glenn Curtiss Drive is in Addison, Texas, and Curtiss Parkway in Miami Springs, Florida. Buffalo, New York, has a Curtiss Park and a Curtis Parkway (named for Glenn despite the incorrect spelling). The Curtiss E-Library in Hialeah, Florida was originally the Lua A. Curtiss Branch Library, named for Glenn's mother.

== Timeline ==
Glenn Curtiss Timeline
- 1878 Birth in Hammondsport, New York
- 1898 Marriage
- 1900 Manufactures Hercules bicycles
- 1901 Motorcycle designer and racer
- 1903 American motorcycle champion
- 1903 Unofficial one-mile motorcycle land speed record 64 mph (103 km/h) on Hercules V8 at Yonkers, New York
- 1904 Thomas Scott Baldwin mounts Curtiss motorcycle engine on a hydrogen-filled dirigible
- 1904 Set 10-mile world speed record
- 1904 Invented handlebar throttle control; also credited to the 1867–1869 Roper steam velocipede
- 1905 Created G.H. Curtiss Manufacturing Company, Inc.
- 1906 Curtiss writes the Wright Brothers offering them an aeronautical motor
- 1907 Curtiss joins Alexander Graham Bell in experimenting in aircraft
- 1907 Set world motorcycle land speed record of 77.6 mph (124.9 km/h)
- 1907 Set world motorcycle land speed record at 136.36 mph (219.45 km/h) in his V8 motorcycle in Ormond Beach, Florida
- 1908 First Army dirigible flight with Curtiss as flight engineer
- 1908 One of several claimants for the first flight of a powered aircraft controlled by ailerons (manned glider flights with ailerons having been accomplished in 1904, unmanned flights even earlier)
- 1908 Lead designer and pilot of "June Bug" on July 4
- 1909 Sale of Curtiss's "Golden Flyer" to the New York Aeronautic Society for US$5,000.00, marks the first sale of any aircraft in the U.S., triggers Wright Brothers lawsuits.
- 1909 Won first international air speed record with 46.5 mph (74.8 km/h) in Rheims, France
- 1909 First U.S. licensed aircraft manufacturer.
- 1909 Established first flying school in United States and exhibition company
- 1910 Long-distance flying record of 150 miles (240 km) from Albany, New York to New York City
- 1910 First simulated bombing runs from an aircraft at Keuka Lake
- 1910 First firearm use from aircraft, piloted by Curtiss
- 1910 First radio communication with aircraft in flight in a Curtiss biplane
- 1910 Curtiss moved to California and set up a shop and flight school at the Los Angeles Motordrome, using the facility for sea plane experiments
- 1910 Trained Blanche Stuart Scott, the first American female pilot
- 1910 First successful takeoff from a United States Navy ship (Eugene Burton Ely, using Curtiss Plane)
- 1911 First landing on a ship (Eugene Burton Ely, using Curtiss Plane) (2 Months later)
- 1911 The Curtiss School of Aviation, established at Rockwell Field in February

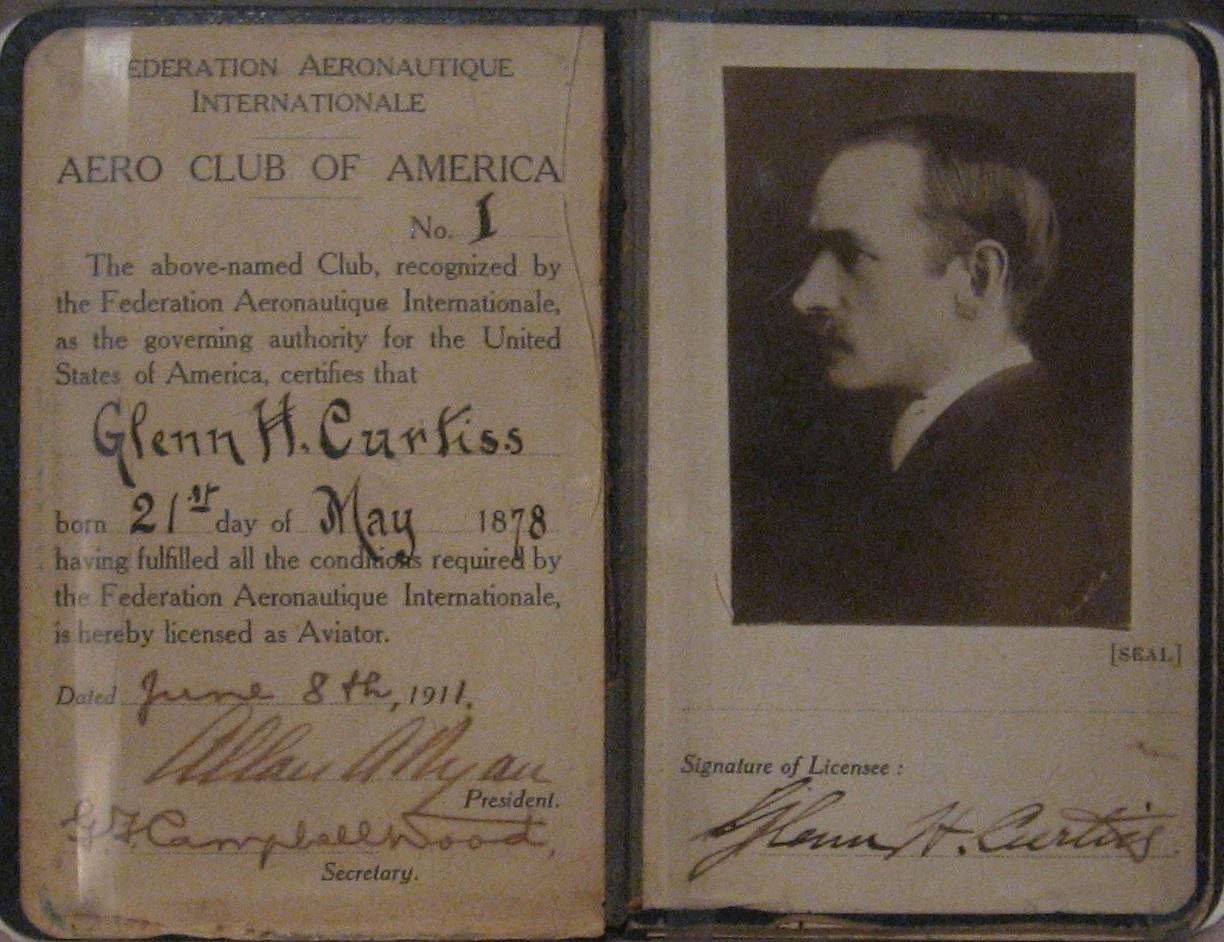
Glenn H. Curtiss's pilot license

- 1911 Pilot license #1 issued for his June Bug flight
- 1911 Ailerons patented
- 1911 Developed first successful pontoon aircraft in US
- 1911 Hydroplane A-1 Triad purchased by US. Navy (US Navy's first aircraft)
- 1911 Developed first retractable landing gear on his hydroaeroplane
- 1911 His first aircraft sold to U.S. Army on April 27
- 1911 Created first military flying school
- 1912 Developed and flew the first flying boat on Lake Keuka
- 1912 First ship catapult launching on October 12 (Lt. Ellyson)
- 1912 Created the first flying school in Florida at Miami Beach
- 1914 Curtiss made a few short flights in the Langley Aerodrome, as part of an unsuccessful attempt to bypass the Wright Brothers' patent on aircraft
- 1915 Start production run of "Jennys" and many other models including flying boats
- 1915 Curtiss started the Atlantic Coast Aeronautical Station on a 20-acre tract east of Newport News (VA) Boat Harbor in the Fall of 1915 with Captain Thomas Scott Baldwin as head.
- 1917 Opens "Experimental Airplane Factory" in Garden City, Long Island
- 1919 Curtiss NC-4 flying boat crosses the Atlantic
- 1919 Commenced private aircraft production with the Oriole
- 1921 Developed Hialeah, Florida, including Hialeah Park Race Track
- 1921 Donated his World War I training field to the Navy
- 1922 Opened Hialeah Park Race Track with his business partner James H. Bright
- 1923 Developed Miami Springs, Florida, and created a flying school and airport
- 1923 (circa) Created first airboats
- 1925 Built his Miami Springs mansion
- 1926 Developed Opa-locka, Florida and airport facility
- 1928 Created the Curtiss Aerocar Company in Opa-locka, Florida.
- 1928 Curtiss towed an Aerocar from Miami to New York City in 39 hours
- 1930 Death in Buffalo, New York
- 1930 Buried in Pleasant Valley Cemetery in Hammondsport, New York
- 1964 Inducted in the National Aviation Hall of Fame
- 1990 Inducted in the Motorsports Hall of Fame of America in the air-racing category

== See also ==
Curtiss Motorcycle at San Francisco Motorcycle Club

- Charles M. Olmsted
- American Trans-Oceanic Company
- Curtiss Model T
- Curtiss Autoplane
- Schneider Trophy
- Curtiss & Bright
- Opa-locka Company

== Bibliography ==
- "At Dayton". Time, October 13, 1924.
- Casey, Louis S (1981). Curtiss, the Hammondsport Era, 1907–1915. New York: Crown Publishers. ISBN 978-0-51754-5652.
- Champlin, Charles (1989). Back there where the past was: a small-town boyhood. Syracuse University Press. ISBN 978-0-81560-6123.
- Curtiss, Glenn (1922). The Curtiss Aviation Book 1912. New York: Fredericj A. Stokes Company.
- de Cet, Mirco. The Illustrated Directory of Motorcycles. St. Paul: Minnesota: MotorBooks/MBI Publishing Company, 2002. ISBN 978-0-7603-1417-3.
- Dizer, John T. Tom Swift & Company. Jefferson, North Carolina: McFarland Publishing, 1982. ISBN 0-89950-024-2.
- FitzGerald-Bush, Frank S. A Dream of Araby: Glenn Curtiss and the Founding of Opa-locka. Opa-locka, Florida: South Florida Archaeological Museum, 1976.
- Harvey, Steve. It Started with a Steamboat: An American Saga. Bloomington, Indiana: AuthorHouse, 2005. ISBN 978-1-4208-4943-1.
- Hatch, Alden (2007). 'Glenn Curtiss: Pioneer of Aviation'. Guilford, Connecticut: The Lyons Press. ISBN 978-1-59921-1459. Archived from the original on November 8, 2023..
- House, Kirk W. (2003). Hell-Rider to King of the Air. SAE International. ISBN 9780-7-68081-343.
- Mitchell, Charles R (2001). Glenn H. Curtiss, aviation pioneer. Charleston, SC: Arcadia. ISBN 978-0-73850-5190.
- Molson, K. M (1995). The Curtiss HS flying boats. Ottawa: National Aviation Museum. ISBN 978-0-66012-0157.
- Roseberry, C. R. (1991). Glenn Curtiss: Pioneer of Flight. Syracuse University Press. ISBN 978-0-81560-2644.
- Shulman, Seth. (2002). Unlocking the Sky: Glenn Hammond Curtiss and the Race to Invent the Airplane. New York: HarperCollins. ISBN 978-0-06184-6939..
- "Speed Limit". Time, October 29, 1923.
- Studer, Clara. Sky Storming Yankee: The Life of Glenn Curtiss. New York: Stackpole Sons, 1937.
- Trimble, William F. Hero of the Air: Glenn Curtiss and the Birth of Naval Aviation. Annapolis, Maryland: Naval Institute Press, 2010. ISBN 978-1-59114-879-1.

Awards and achievements
Preceded by William Allen White	Cover of Time magazine October 13, 1924	Succeeded by Patrick Hastings
