= Georges Legagneux =

French aviator (1882–1914)

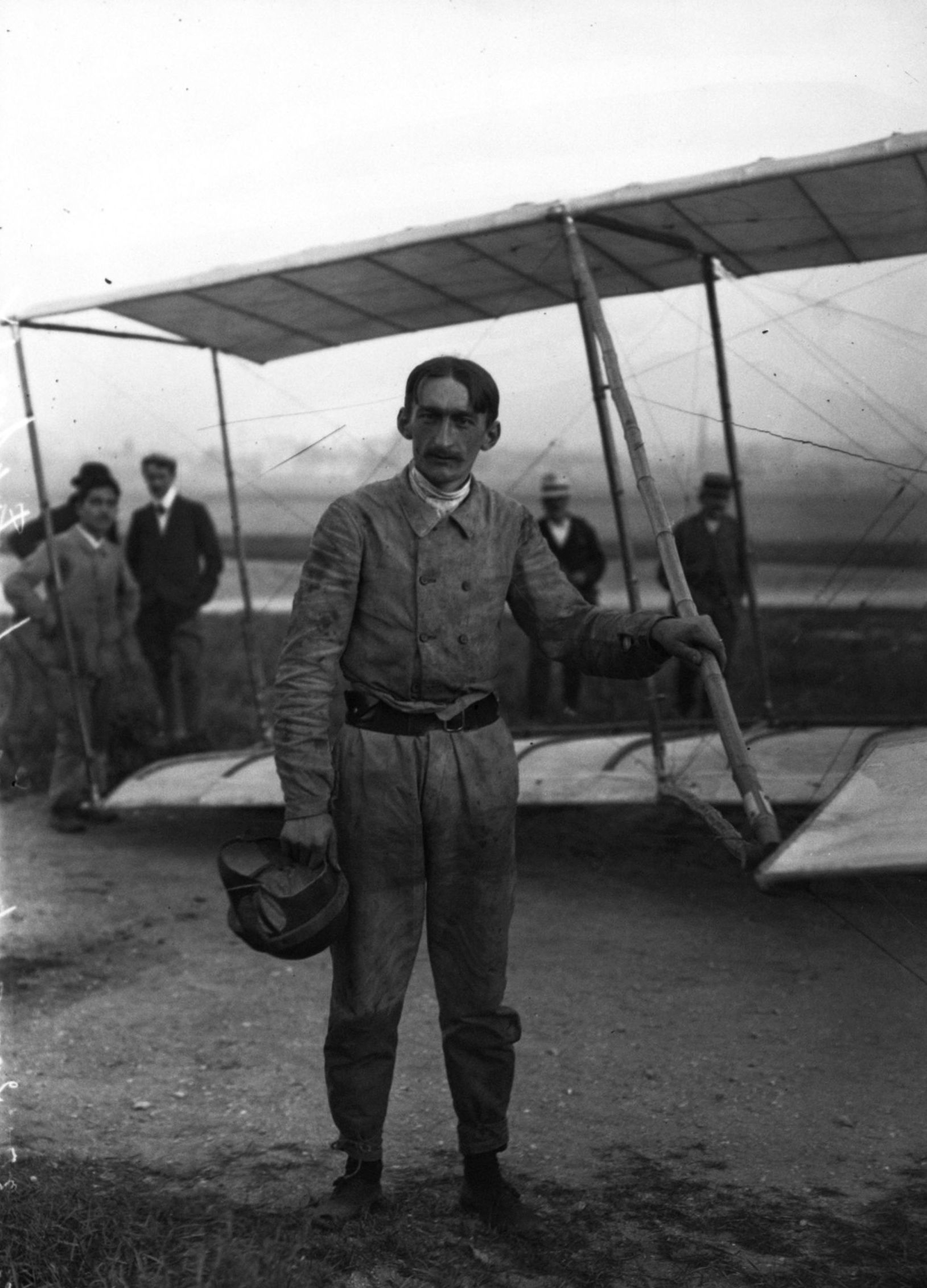
- Georges Legagneux with his Ferber IX in 1908.
- Born: Georges Legagneux; 24 December 1882; Puteaux, France
- Died: 6 July 1914 (aged 31); Saumur, France
- Cause of death: Aviation accident
- Occupation: Aviator

Georges Théophile Legagneux (24 December 1882 in Puteaux – 6 July 1914 in Saumur) was a French aviator, the first person to fly an aircraft in several countries, and the first to fly a fixed-wing aircraft higher than both 10,000 and 20,000 feet (3,048 and 6,096 m).

== Biography ==
=== Birth and early career ===
Legagneux was born in Puteaux, France, on 24 December 1882. He began his career in aviation as a mechanic for Léon Levavasseur, the builder of Antoinette aircraft. He also worked as a mechanic for Ferdinand Ferber, thanks to whom he began to fly in 1908, with some success. On 19 August 1908 he made a flight in the Ferber IX at Issy-les-Moulineaux, France, that earned him the third and final 200-metre (656 ft) prize offered by the Aéro-Club de France, but he retrospectively was disqualified in September 1908 because he achieved his performance too early in the morning.

=== 1909 ===
Legagneux trained at Port-Aviation (often called "Juvisy Airfield") at Viry-Châtillon in January 1909 and at the Camp de Châlons in Mourmelon-le-Grand in February 1909. In April 1909 he made aerial exhibition flights in a Voisin Farman I biplane in Vienna — his flight there on 23 April 1909 being the first-ever fixed-wing aircraft flight in Austria — and was slightly injured in a crash of the plane. His flight in Stockholm on 29 July 1909 marked the first flight by a powered airplane in Sweden. He took part in the first Grande Semaine d'Aviation de la Champagne, held near Reims from 22 to 29 August 1909, and impressed observers by flying "very high," according to Frantz Reichel, a correspondent for Le Figaro.

Legagneux subsequently took part in "aviation sessions" in Belgium and the Russian Empire. On 15 September 1909, he flew his airplane from Khodynka Field, near Moscow, and some sources claim that the five short flights he made were the first aircraft flights in Russia, although other sources note a flight in Odessa (now in Ukraine) on 25 July 1909 by an aviator with the surname Van Der Schrouff and claim that it was the first in Russia. Legagneux flew again on 19 September 1909, and then traveled to Odessa and Saint Petersburg for further demonstrations, at the end of which he crashed in a swamp, emerging from the aircraft unharmed.

=== 1910 ===
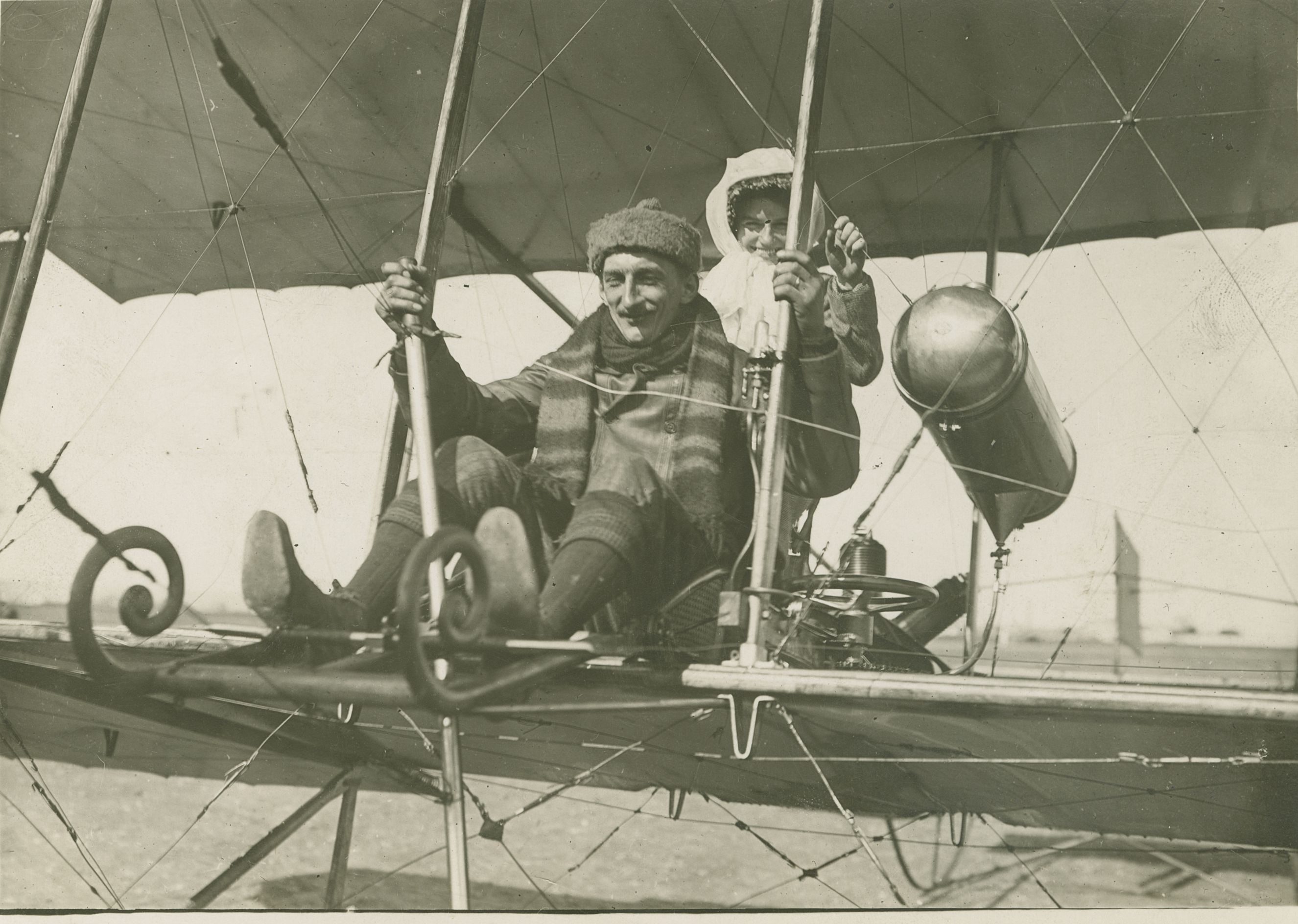
Georges Legagneux with his wife in 1910.

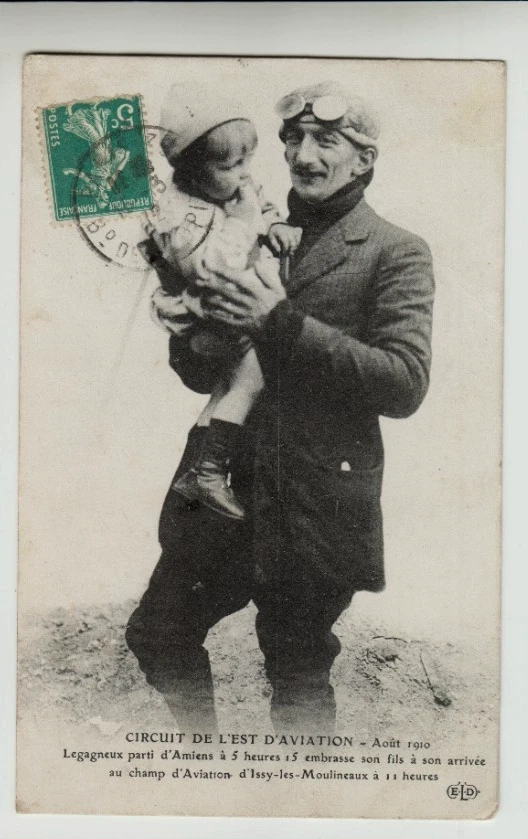
Legagneux and son, 1910

By early January 1910 Legagneaux was a flight instructor for Voisin, and on 19 April 1910 he received French pilot's license number 55. He took part in an air meet at Nice, flying a Sommer 1910 biplane, then in an air meet at Lyon, where he came in second in the passenger-carrying race, having taken Blanche Herriot, the wife of the statesman and academic Édouard Herriot, on board for the occasion.

Legagneux participated in the Angers-Saumur race on 6 June 1910, the first aircraft race between two cities. A 27-mile (43 km) race with seven competitors, it attracted over 200,000 spectators. Legagneux flew a Sommer 1910 biplane and was one of only three contestants to take off. He finished second in 36 minutes 45 seconds, behind winner Robert Martinet by 5 minutes 10 seconds. Legagneux took part in the second Grande Semaine d'Aviation de la Champagne, held in July 1910, taking the mathematician and statesman Paul Painlevé aboard as a passenger for a flight over Reims.

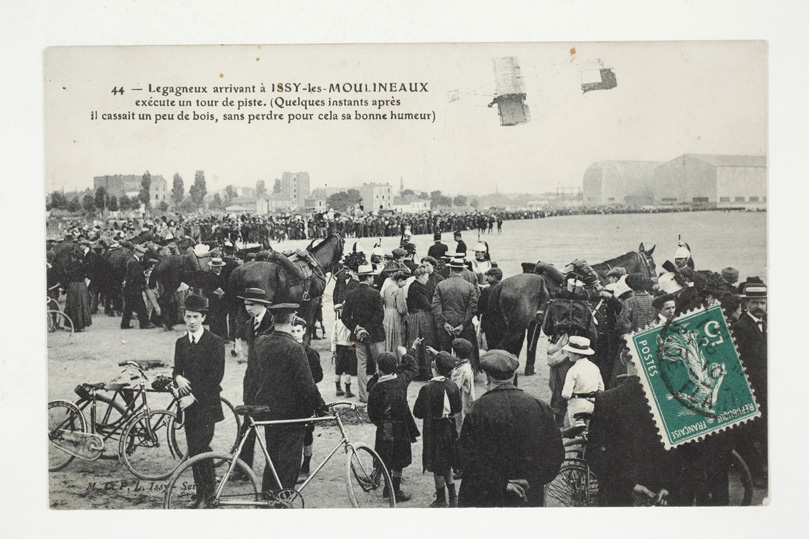
Legagneux's arrival at Issy-les-Moulineaux for the Circuit de l'Est, August 1910.

In August 1910, participating in the Circuit de l'Est in a Farman II biplane, Legagneux only managed to finish four of the six stages in the time limit set for each, but he completed all six stages and was the third competitor to do so and the first in a biplane. At the Troyes stage, he was the only competitor to take to the air during the rest day there, flying to entertain the public. At Charleville-Mézières, he was the first to take off for the fourth stage despite a strong wind that many observers thought would make a takeoff impossible, and accomplished what Frantz Reichel described in Le Figaro as a "fantastic journey," landing five times along the way, including one for lunch with fellow competitor Julien Mamet — who had broken a wheel of his Blériot XI — and was prevented from reaching Douai within the time limit only by a lack of fuel. During the final stage, he took time to land along the way for lunch and to make a short flight over Puteaux, his home town. His flying skill and his sense of spectacle enthused the commentators: "If he exceeded the assigned time limits for two of the stages, he nevertheless completed the entire circuit. His numerous and easy stopovers, decided according to the circumstances or the whim of the moment, in open fields, in unprepared locations, attest [to] his personal skill," wrote L'Aérophile in its edition of 1 September 1910. Comparing him to the two winners, Alfred Leblanc and Émile Aubrun, Reichel in Le Figaro praised his whims as "almost conclusive" as to the possibilities of aviation.

At an air meet in Baie de Seine on 27 August 1910, Legagneux frightened onlookers when the rudder controls of his biplane failed in flight and he struck a pylon with his left wing and crashed, suffering a fractured eyebrow. Despite the mishap, he finished the day with the greatest distance covered by any of the competitors. In October 1910 he won the prize for the highest altitude at an air meet in Milan, Italy, climbing to 2,150 metres (7,054 ft), and gave a flying exhibition at Zurich, Switzerland.

On 9 December 1910, Legagneux broke the altitude record set by the American aviator Ralph Johnstone on 27 October 1910. Johnstone had reached 2,582 metres (8,471 ft), but taking off from Pau, Legagneux reached an altitude of 3,200 metres (10,499 ft) in a Blériot XI. On 21 December 1910 he set the world distance record with a flight of 515.5 kilometres (320.3 mi), but lost his chance to win the 1910 International Michelin Cup for the longest distance covered by a flight during the year when Maurice Tabuteau covered a distance of 584.745 kilometres (363.344 mi) in a Farman MF.7 biplane in a flight at Buc lasting 7 hours 48 minutes 36.6 seconds on 30 December 1910.

=== 1911–1913 ===
Legagneux and his teammate Robert Martinet founded the Corbelieu aerodrome near Compiègne, where they established a flight school using Farman airplanes. Legagneux also continued his career as an instructor pilot at Voisin and then, in 1911, became chief pilot at Breguet. He was made a Knight of the Legion of Honour in January 1912 and broke the world altitude record four times, including a climb to 5,450 metres (17,881 ft) in 1912 and setting it the last time in December 1913 when he reached 6,120 metres (20,079 ft) in a Nieuport.

=== Death ===
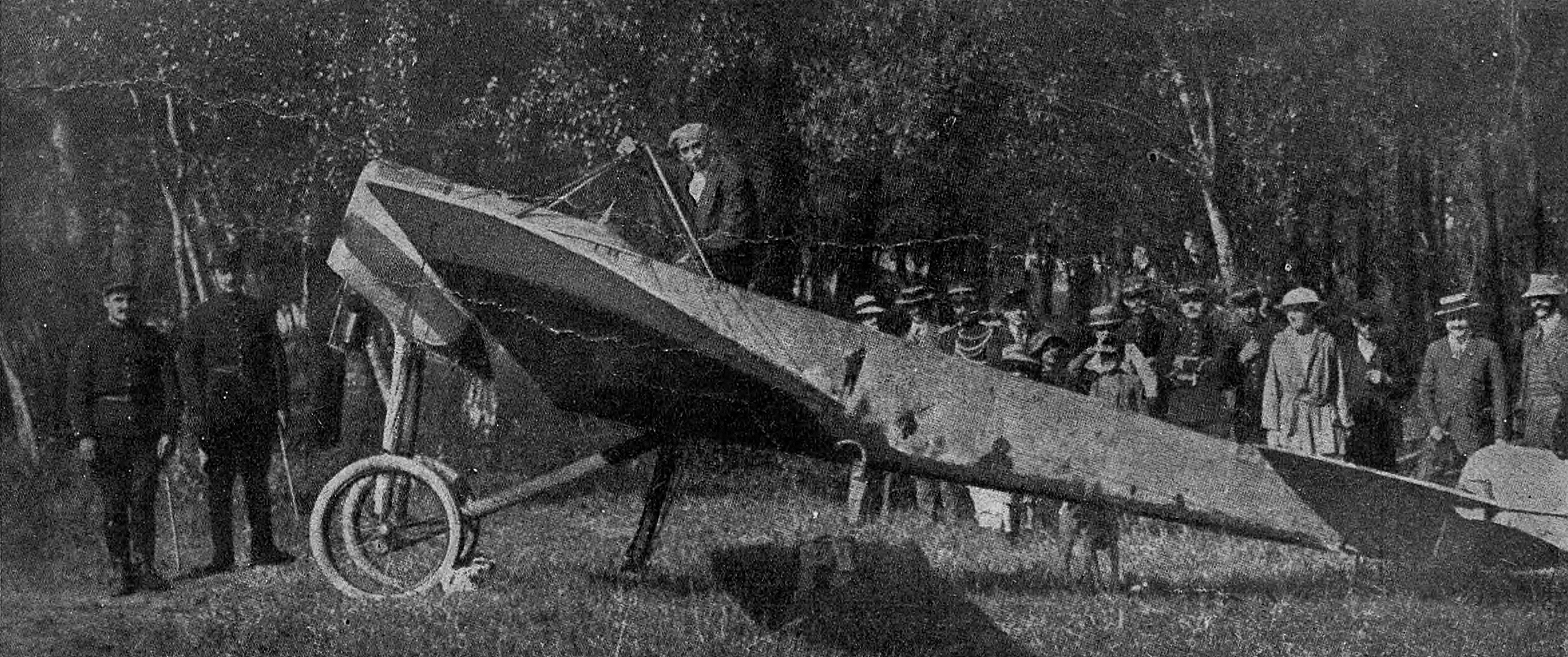
Georges Legagneux right before his last flight on 6 July 1914.

While flying over Saumur on 6 July 1914, Legagneux was killed when he entered a dive and never pulled out of it, plunging into the Loire. Various theories attributed the accident to the propeller breaking in flight, an unexpected shutdown of the engine, or the explosion of the engine, which would have killed Legagneux even before the plane struck the river. The uncertainty over the cause of the accident fueled regret in France that the Aero-Club de France had rejected the creation of an air accident investigation commission like the one that already existed in the United Kingdom.

== Honors and awards ==
- Knight of the Legion of Honour, January 1912
