= Blériot XI =

French airplane

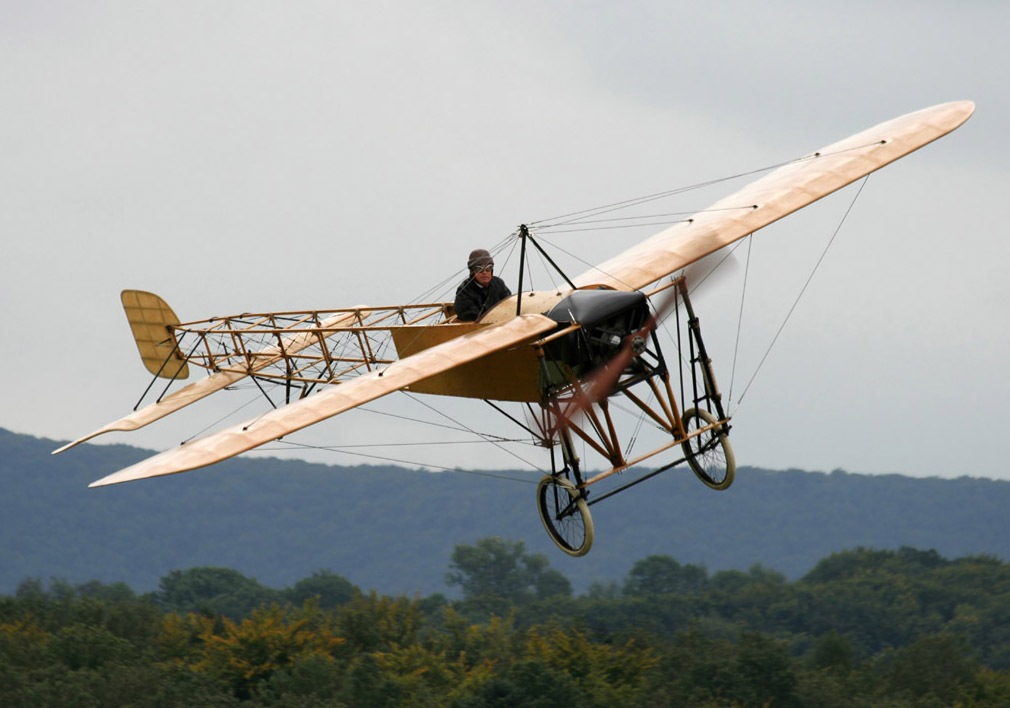
- Thulin A (licence-built Blériot XI)

General information
- Type: Civil tourer/trainer/military
- Manufacturer: Louis Blériot
- Designer: Louis Blériot and Raymond Saulnier
- Status: Active
- Number built: 103

History
- First flight: 23 January 1909; 117 years ago

The Blériot XI is a French aircraft from the pioneer era of aviation. The first example was used by Louis Blériot to make the first flight across the English Channel in a heavier-than-air aircraft, on 25 July 1909. This is one of the most famous accomplishments of the pioneer era of aviation, and not only won Blériot a lasting place in history but also assured the future of his aircraft manufacturing business. The event caused a major reappraisal of the importance of aviation; the English newspaper The Daily Express led its story of the flight with the headline "Britain is no longer an Island."

The aircraft was produced in both single- and two-seat versions, powered by several different engines, and was widely used for competition and training purposes. Military versions were bought by many countries, continuing in service until after the outbreak of World War I in 1914. Two restored examples, one each in the United Kingdom and the United States, of original Blériot XI aircraft are thought to be the two oldest airworthy aircraft in the world.

== Design ==
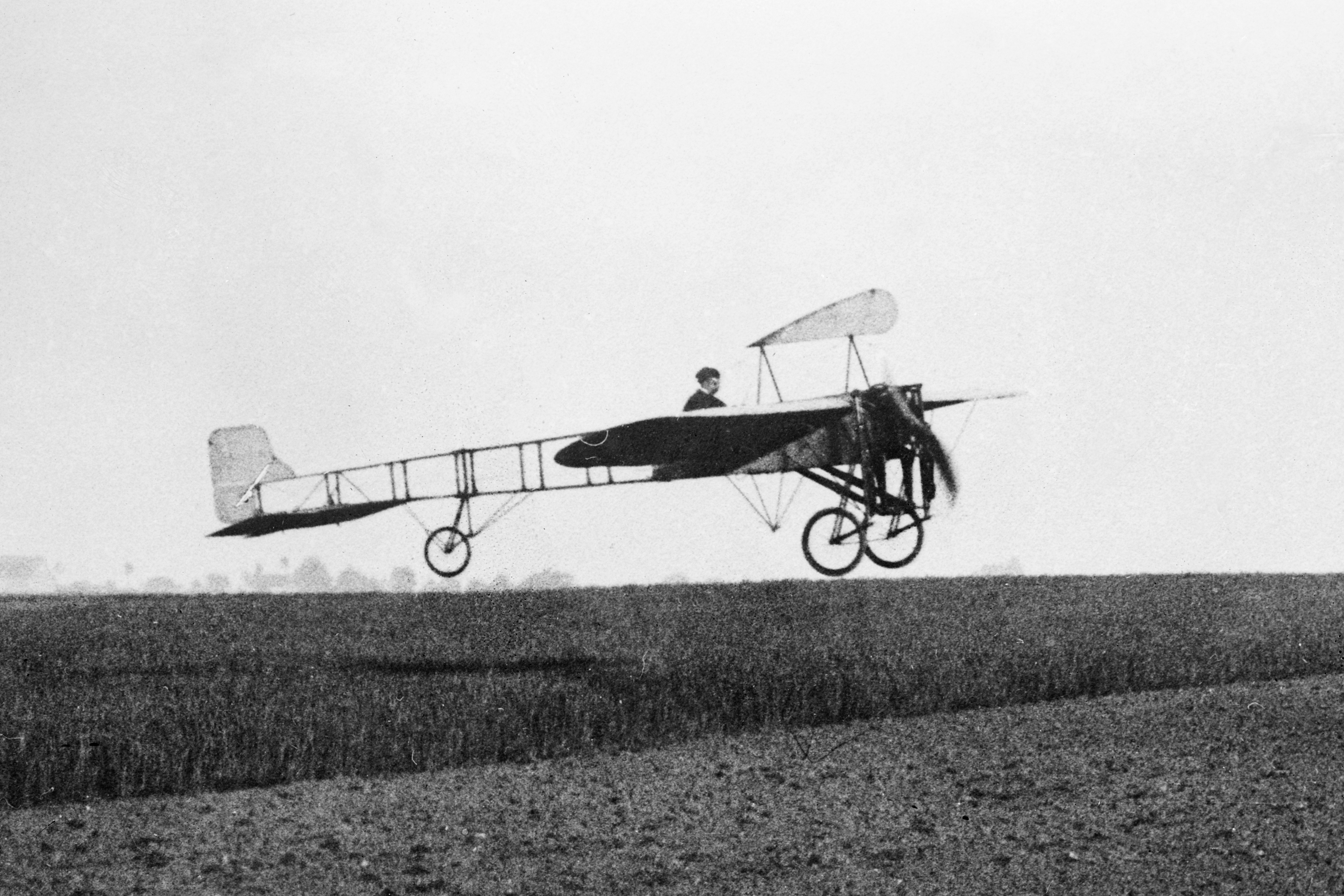
Blériot XI as first built, with small "teardrop" profile fin on dorsal cabane

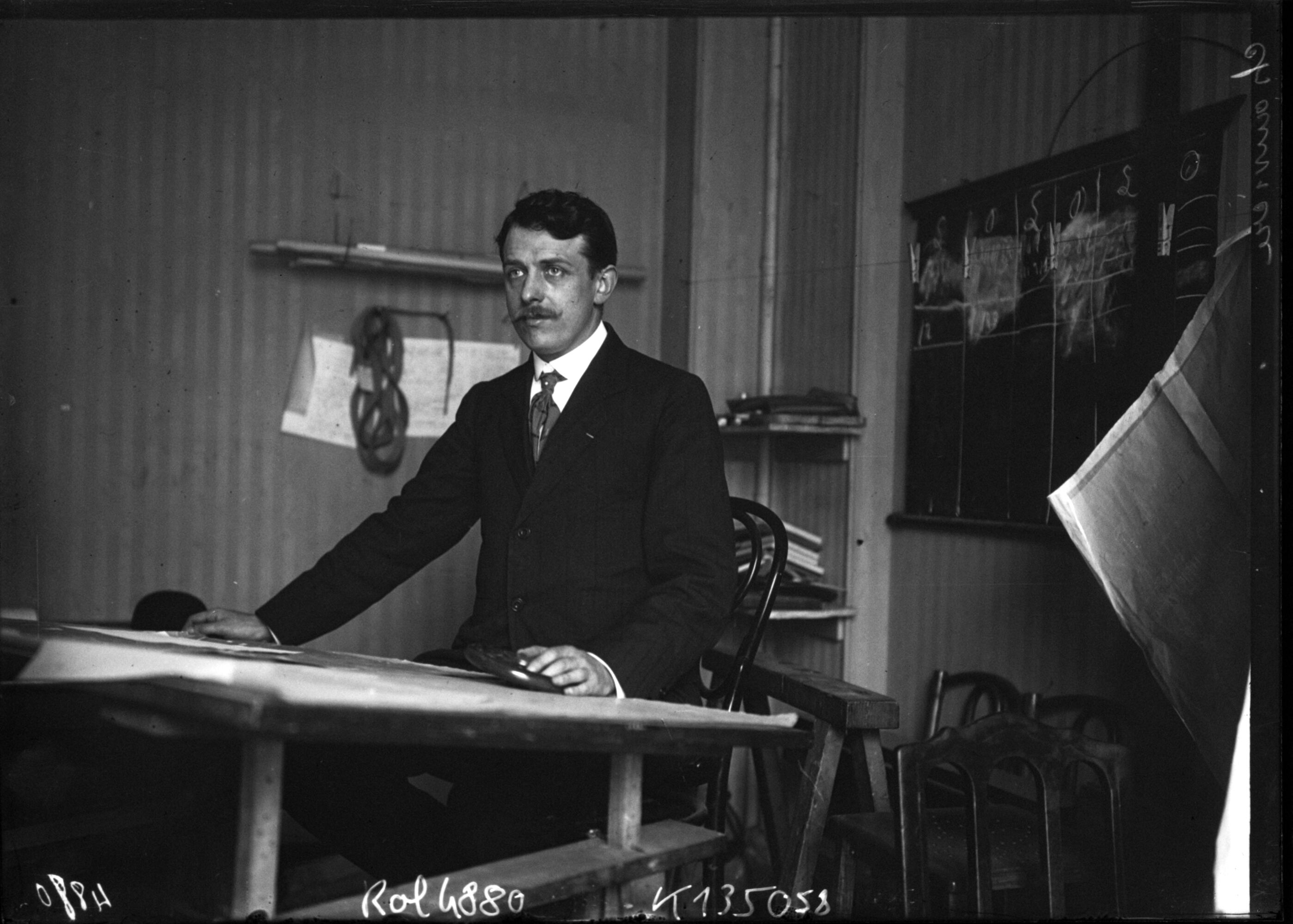
Lucien Chauvière, designer of the Integrale propeller for the Blériot XI

The Blériot XI, largely designed by Raymond Saulnier, was a development of the Blériot VIII, which Blériot had flown successfully in 1908. Like its predecessor, it was a tractor-configuration monoplane with a partially covered box-girder fuselage built from ash with wire cross-bracing. The principal difference was the use of wing warping for lateral control. The tail surfaces consisted of a small balanced all-moving rudder mounted on the rearmost vertical member of the fuselage and a horizontal tailplane mounted under the lower longerons. This had elevator surfaces making up the outermost part of the fixed horizontal surface; these "tip elevators" were linked by a torque tube running through the inner section. The bracing and warping wires were attached to a dorsal, five-component "house-roof" shaped cabane consisting of a pair of inverted V struts with their apices connected by a longitudinal tube, and an inverted four-sided pyramidal ventral cabane, also of steel tubing, below. When first built it had a wingspan of 7 m (23 ft) and a small teardrop-shaped fin mounted on the cabane, which was later removed.

Like its predecessor, it had the engine mounted directly in front of the leading edge of the wing and the main undercarriage was also like that of the Type VIII, with the wheels mounted in castering trailing arms which could slide up and down steel tubes, the movement being sprung by bungee cords. This simple and ingenious design allowed crosswind landings with less risk of damage. A sprung tailwheel was fitted to the rear fuselage in front of the tailplane, with a similar castering arrangement.

When shown at the Paris Aero Salon in December 1908, the aircraft was powered by a 26 kW (35 hp) seven-cylinder R.E.P. engine driving a four-bladed paddle-type propeller. The aircraft was first flown at Issy-les-Moulineaux on 23 January 1909. Although the aircraft handled well, the engine proved extremely unreliable and, at the suggestion of his mechanic, Ferdinand Collin, Blériot made contact with Alessandro Anzani, a famous motorcycle racer whose successes were due to the engines that he made, and who had recently entered the field of aero-engine manufacture. On 27 May 1909, a 19 kW (25 hp) Anzani 3-cylinder fan-configuration (semi-radial) engine was fitted. The propeller was also replaced with a Chauvière Intégrale two-bladed scimitar propeller made from laminated walnut wood. This propeller design was a major advance in French aircraft technology and was the first European propeller to rival the efficiency of the propellers used by the Wright Brothers.

During early July, Blériot was occupied with flight trials of a new aircraft, the two-seater Type XII, but resumed flying the Type XI on 18 July. By then, the small cabane fin had been removed and the wingspan increased by 79 cm (31 in). On 26 June, he managed a flight lasting 36 minutes 55 seconds, and on 13 July, Blériot won the Aero Club de France's first Prix du Voyage with a 42 km (26 mi) flight between Etampes and Orléans.

== Channel crossing ==
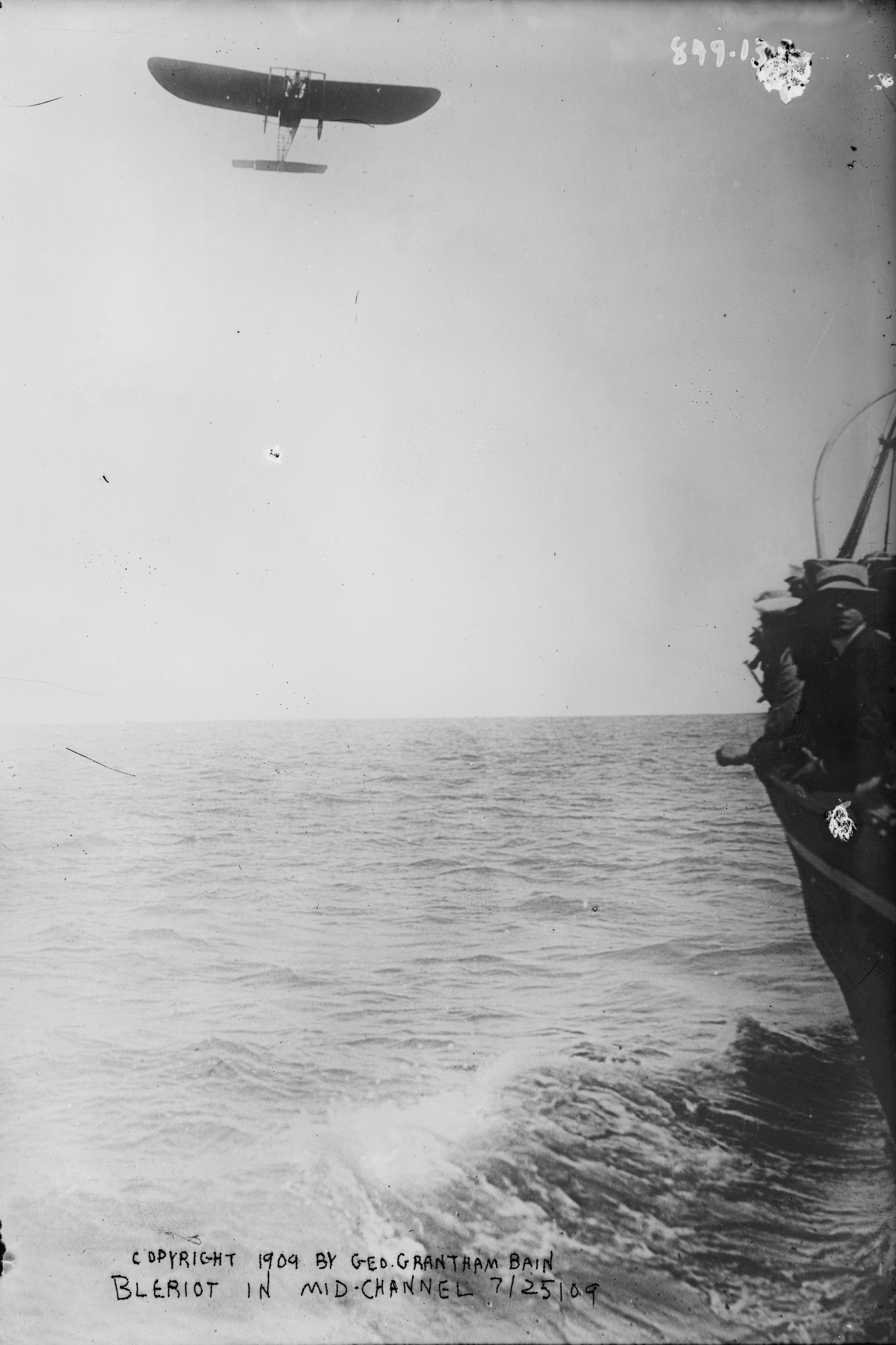
Blériot over the English Channel, 25 July 1909

The Blériot XI gained lasting fame on 25 July 1909, when Blériot crossed the English Channel from Calais to Dover, winning a £1,000 (equivalent to £115,000 in 2018) prize awarded by the Daily Mail. For several days, high winds had grounded Blériot and his rivals: Hubert Latham, who flew an Antoinette monoplane, and Count de Lambert, who brought two Wright biplanes. On 25 July, when the wind had dropped in the morning and the skies had cleared, Blériot took off at sunrise. Flying without the aid of a compass, he deviated to the east of his intended course, but, nonetheless, spotted the English coast to his left. Battling turbulent wind conditions, Blériot made a heavy "pancake" landing, nearly collapsing the undercarriage and shattering one blade of the propeller, but he was unhurt. The flight had taken 36.5 minutes and made Blériot a celebrity, instantly resulting in many orders for copies of his aircraft.

The aircraft, which never flew again, was hurriedly repaired and put on display at Selfridges department store in London. It was later displayed outside the offices of the French newspaper Le Matin and eventually bought by the Musee des Arts et Metiers in Paris.

== Subsequent history ==
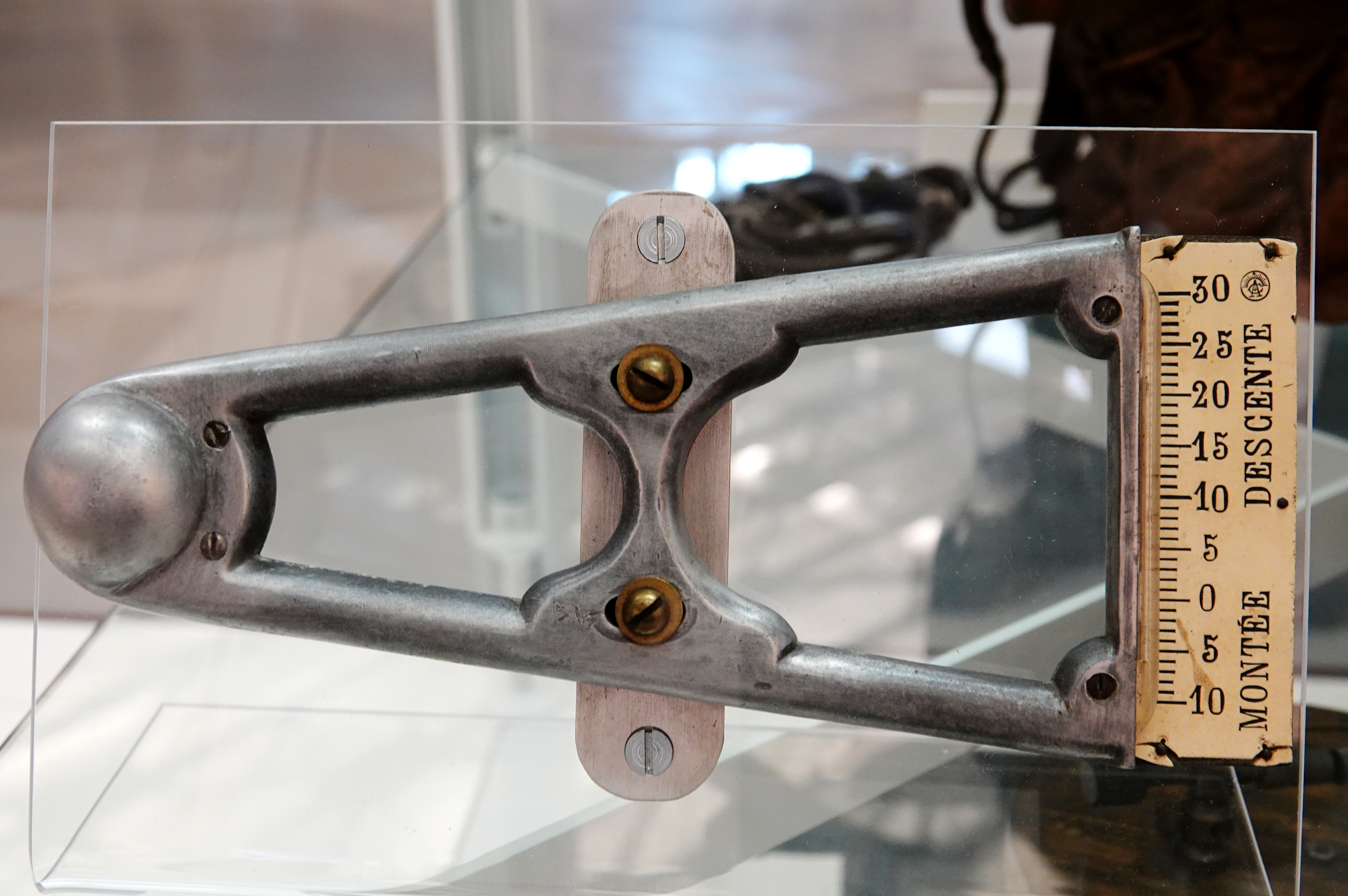
Blériot Monoplane inclinometer

After the successful crossing of the English Channel, there was a great demand for Blériot XIs. By the end of September 1909, orders had been received for 103 aircraft. After an accident at an aviation meeting in Istanbul in December 1909, Blériot gave up competition flying, and the company's entries for competitions were flown by other pilots, including Alfred Leblanc, who had managed the logistics of the cross-channel flight, and subsequently bought the first production Type XI, going on to become one of the chief instructors at the flying schools established by Blériot.

In February 1912 the future of the Type XI was threatened by the French army placing a ban on the use of all monoplanes. This was the result of a series of accidents in which Blériot aircraft had suffered wing failure in flight. The first of these incidents had occurred on 4 January 1910, killing Léon Delagrange, and was generally attributed to the fact that Delagrange had fitted an over-powerful engine, so overstressing the airframe. A similar accident had killed Peruvian pilot Jorge Chavez at the end of 1910 at the end of the first flight over the Pennine Alps, and in response to this the wing spars of the Blériot had been strengthened. A later accident prompted further strengthening of the spars. Blériot produced a report for the French government which came to the conclusion that the problem was not the strength of the wing spars but a failure to take into account the amount of downward force to which aircraft wings could be subjected, and that the problem could be solved by increasing the strength of the upper bracing wires. This analysis was accepted, and Blériot's prompt and thorough response to the problem enhanced rather than damaged his reputation.

=== Further development ===
The Type XI remained in production until the outbreak of the First World War, and a number of variations were produced. Various types of engine were fitted, including the 120° Y-configuration, "full radial" three-cylinder Anzani (the restored example at Old Rhinebeck Aerodrome still flies with this) and the 37 kW (50 hp) and 52 kW (70 hp), seven-cylinder Gnome rotary engines. Both single and two-seat versions were built, and there were variations in wingspan and fuselage length. In later aircraft the tip elevators were replaced by a more conventional trailing edge elevator, the tailwheel was replaced by a skid, and the former "house-roof" five-member dorsal cabane was replaced by a simpler, four-sided pyramidally framed unit similar to the ventral arrangement for the later rotary-powered versions. Blériot marketed the aircraft in four categories: trainers, sport or touring models, military aircraft, and racing or exhibition aircraft.

=== Civilian use ===
The Type XI took part in many competitions and races. In August 1910 Leblanc won the 805 km (500 mi) Circuit de l'Est race, and another Blériot flown by Émile Aubrun was the only other aircraft to finish the course. In October 1910, Claude Grahame-White won the second competition for the Gordon Bennett Trophy flying a Type XI fitted with a 75 kW (100 hp) Gnome, beating a similar aircraft flown by Leblanc, which force-landed on the last lap. During the race Leblanc had established a new world speed record. In 1911, Andre Beaumont won the Circuit of Europe in a Type XI and another, flown by Roland Garros, came second.

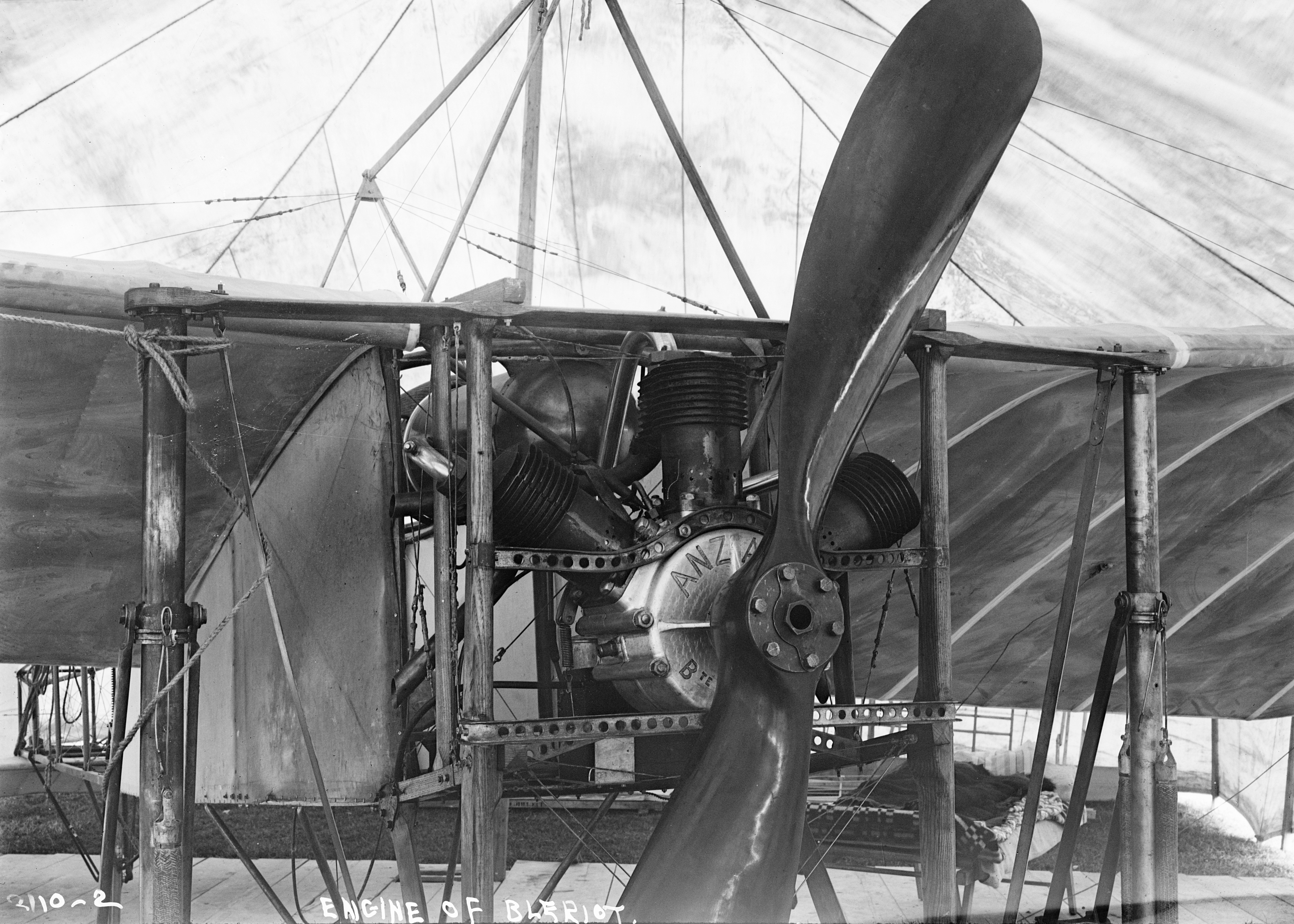
Anzani engined Blériot XI similar to the aircraft used for the Channel flight

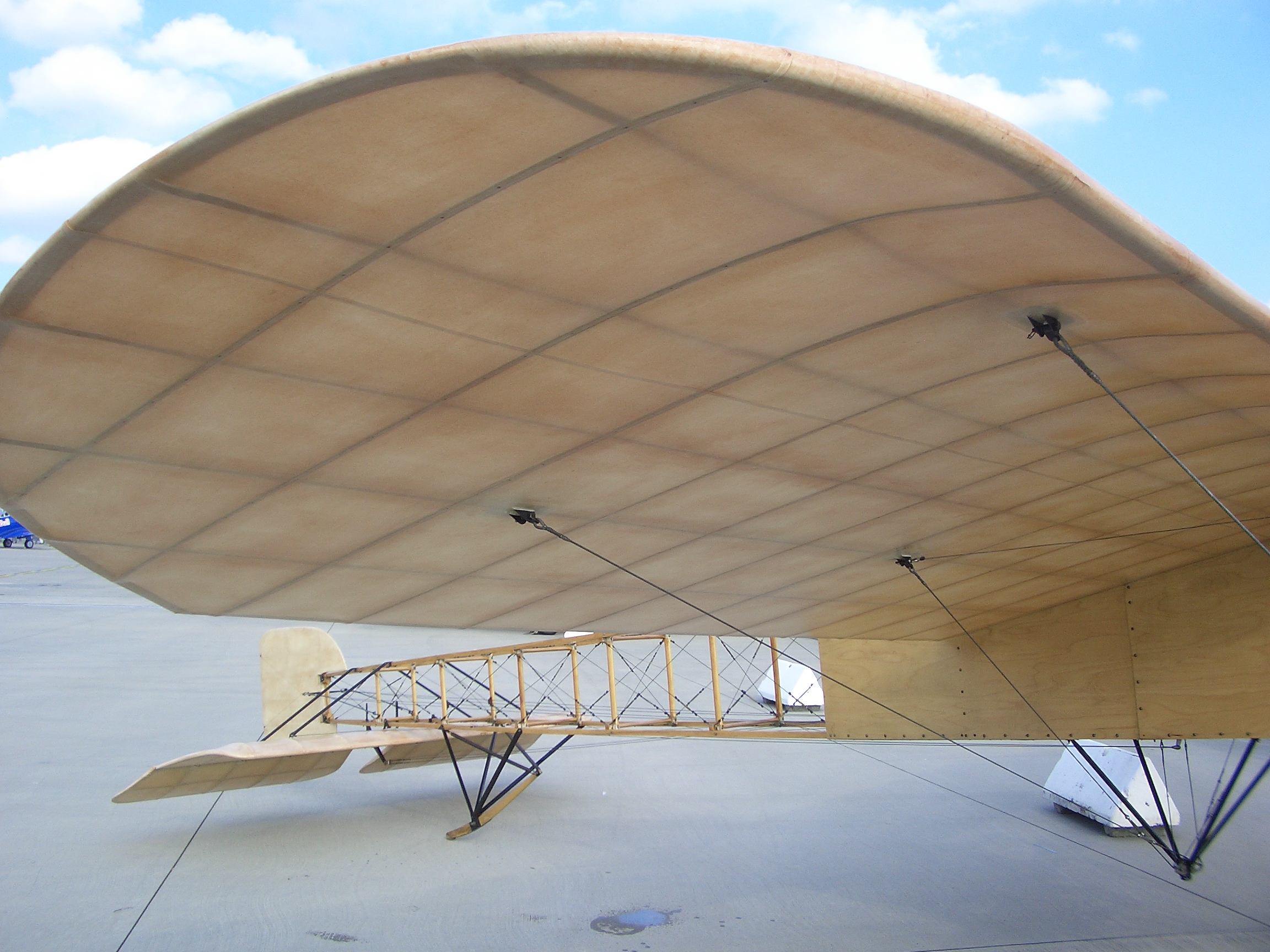
Detail of replica Blériot XI wing, Hamburg Airport Days, 2007

Louis Blériot established his first flying school at Etampes near Rouen in 1909. Another was started at Pau, where the climate made year-round flying more practical, in early 1910 and in September 1910 a third was established at Hendon Aerodrome near London. A considerable number of pilots were trained: by 1914 nearly 1,000 pilots had gained their Aero Club de France license at the Blériot schools, around half the total number of licences issued. Flight training was offered free to those who had bought a Blériot aircraft: for others, it initially cost 2,000 francs, this being reduced to 800 francs in 1912. A gifted pupil favoured by good weather could gain a license in as little as eight days, although for some it took as long as six weeks. There were no dual-control aircraft in these early days, training simply consisting of basic instruction on the use of the controls followed by solo taxying exercises, progressing to short straight-line flights and then to circuits. To gain a license, a pilot had to make three circular flights of more than 5 km (3 mi), landing within 150 m (490 ft) of a designated point.

=== Military use ===
The first Blériot XIs entered military service in Italy and France in 1910, and a year later some were used by Italy in North Africa (the first use of heavier-than-air aircraft in a war), as well as by Mexico. The British Royal Flying Corps received its first Blériots in 1912. During the early stages of World War I eight French, six British and six Italian squadrons operated various military versions of the aircraft, mainly for observation duties but also as trainers, and in the case of single-seaters as light bombers with a bomb load of up to 25 kg.

== Famous Blériot monoplane pilots ==
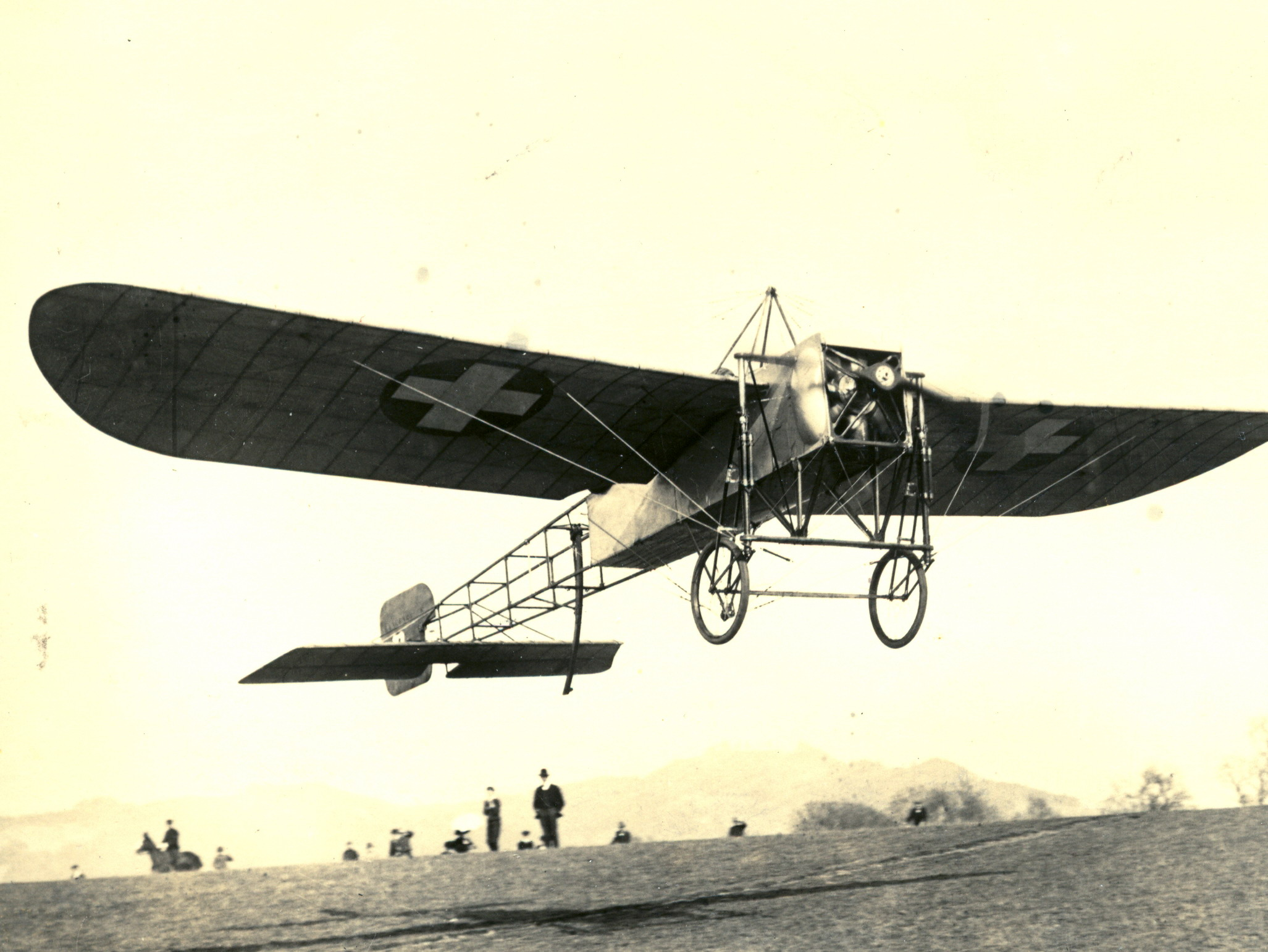
Oskar Bider starting from Bern to his flight over the Alps, showing the pyramidal dorsal cabane of later Bleriot XI examples

- Oskar Bider – Swiss aviator who flew over the Pyrenees and the Alps in 1913.
- Baron Carl Cederström, who made the first flight of a heavier-than-air craft in Norway on 14 October 1910. He made a flight of 23 minutes and reached a height of 300 metres (983.9 feet).
- Jorge Chavez – French-Peruvian aviator who crossed the Alps in 1910, but crashed on arrival and was killed.
- Jean Conneau (André Beaumont) In 1911 won the Paris-Rome race, the Circuit d'Europe (Tour of Europe) on 7 July and the Daily Mail Circuit of Britain Race on 26 July 1911.
- Edith Maud Cook (Flying name Miss Spencer Kavanaugh). Attended Louis Blériot’s Flying School in Pau, France, as the school’s first female student. Was the first British female pilot and first British woman to make a solo flight, in a Blériot XI (type traversée de la Manche), but died in a parachute accident in 1910 before getting her licence.
- Antal Lányi (Austro-Hungarian Monarchy) On 28 August 1911 Antal Lányi flew over Lake Balaton (the biggest lake in Central Europe) from Badacsony to Fonyód with a Blériot XI airplane.
- Denys Corbett-Wilson – Anglo-Irish aviator who made the first successful flight from Britain to Ireland in April 1912.
- Leon Delagrange – One of the first people to fly an aircraft in France, killed on 4 January 1910 flying a Blériot XI when a wing failed.
- Carlo Piazza – On 22/23 October 1911, Captain Piazza of the Italian Royal Army Air Services conducted the first aerial reconnaissance flight, between Tripoli and Ain Zara during the Italo-Turkish War.
- John Domenjoz (1886–1952) – Performed aerobatics in South, Central and North America in 1914–1918. His Gnome rotary-powered Blériot-XI is displayed at the National Air & Space Museum, Washington.
- Roland Garros – Won second place in the 1911 Circuit of Europe race, and set two world altitude records in 1912 in an adapted Type XI, flying to 5,000 m (16,000 ft) on 6 September 1912
- Claude Grahame-White Won the 1910 Gordon Bennett Trophy race, held in New York, flying a Blériot
- Eugène Gilbert – Went to the Blériot school in 1910 after having built his own small unsuccessful aircraft in 1909. During a flight across the Pyrenees Mountains in the 1911 Paris to Madrid air race he and his Blériot XI were attacked by a large eagle, which Gilbert drove off by firing a pistol.
- Tryggve Gran – Norwegian aviator, first to cross the North Sea from Scotland to Norway, on 30 July 1914. The flight set a record for the longest flight over open water, a distance of 450 km (280 mi) taking 4 hours and 10 minutes.
- Maurice Guillaux – French aviator, visited Australia April–October 1914. Flew Australia's first air mail and air freight from Melbourne to Sydney, 16–18 July 1914.
- Gustav Hamel – Flew the world's first regular airmail service between Hendon and Windsor in September 1911.
- Vasily Kamensky – a famous Russian Futurist poet, one of the pioneering aviators of Russia.
- Jan Kašpar – Czech aviator, first person to fly in Czech lands on 16 April 1910.
- Hubert Le Blon – A former racing car driver who took up aviation and designed his own monoplane. On 2 April 1910, flying a Bleriot XI, he became the second (after Delagrange) fatality in the type after crashing in San Sebastian, Spain.
- Alfred Leblanc – Broke the flight airspeed record on 29 October 1910 while flying a Blériot XI. His speed was calculated at 68.20 mph (109.76 km/h): on 11 April 1911 he raised the record to 111.8 km/h
- Bernetta Miller – Fifth licensed woman pilot in the U.S. Chosen as pilot to demonstrate the Moisant-Bleriot monoplane to the U.S. Army in 1912.
- Jan Olieslagers (1883–1942) – Lieutenant in the Belgian Army during the First World War.
- Earle Ovington – First airmail pilot in the United States, used a Blériot XI to carry a sack of mail from Garden City, New York to Mineola, NY
- Adolphe Pégoud – First man to demonstrate the full aerobatic potential of the Blériot XI, flying a loop with it in 1913. Together with John Domenjoz and Edmond Perreyon, he successfully created what is considered the first air show.
- Harriet Quimby – First licensed female pilot in the United States; first female to fly the English Channel solo. Died on 1 July 1912 when she and her passenger were ejected from her new Blériot XI-2.
- Rene Simon – In February 1911 the Mexican government engaged Rene Simon, a member of an aerial circus touring the southwestern United States, to reconnoiter rebel positions near the border city of Juarez.
- Emile Taddéoli – Swiss aviator who first flew on 22 March 1910, in his newly bought Blériot XI, and flew about 150,000 kilometres (93,000 mi) during the next five years, using various aircraft, among them the Blériot XI, Morane-Borel monoplane, Dufaux 4, Dufaux 5 and SIAI S.13 seaplane.
- Ahmet Ali Çelikten – Ottoman-born Turkish fighter pilot who was the first black pilot in aviation history.

== Variants ==
Blériot XI (REP)
1908, the first Type XI, powered by a 22 kW (30 hp) REP engine, displayed at the 1908 Paris Salon Exposition, first flown at Issy on 18 January 1909.

Blériot XI (Anzani)
1909, the first aircraft re-engined with a 19 kW (25 hp) Anzani engine and with wings enlarged from 12 to 14 m^{2} (130 to 150 sq ft). Fitted with a flotation bag for Blériot's cross channel flight.

Blériot XI Militaire
Military single-seater, powered by a 37 kW (50 hp) Gnome engine.

Blériot XI Artillerie
Very similar to the Militaire version, but with a fuselage divided into two sections so that it could be folded for transport.

Blériot XI-1 Artillerie
Single-seater powered by a 50 hp (37 kW) Gnome 7 Omega, with collapsible fuselage for transportation.

Blériot XI E1
Single-seat training version.

Blériot XI Type Ecole
A trainer with considerable wing dihedral, looped cane tailskid, tip elevators and other modifications.

Blériot XI R1 Pinguin
Rouleur or ground training aircraft, fitted with clipped wings and a wide-track undercarriage with a pair of forward-projecting skids to prevent nose-overs. Some examples were fitted with a 26 kW (35 hp) Anzani engine and others with old 37 kW (50 hp) Gnome engines that were no longer producing their full power output.

Blériot XI (1912)
From March 1912 with two-piece elevators and high fuselage skid.

Blériot XI (1913)
As for Blériot XI (1912) with landing gear re-inforcements removed, powered by a 60 hp (45 kW) Clerget 7Y

Blériot XI Parasol
aka Brevet-gouin, modified by Lieutenant Gouin and Henri Chazal with a parasol wing and split airbrake/rudder.

Blériot XIbis
In January 1910 the bis introduced more conventional tail feathers and elliptical elevators with a half-cowled Gnome engine.

Blériot XI-2 Tandem
Standard tandem 2-seat touring, reconnaissance, training model, powered by a 52 kW (70 hp) Gnome 7 Gamma rotary piston engine.

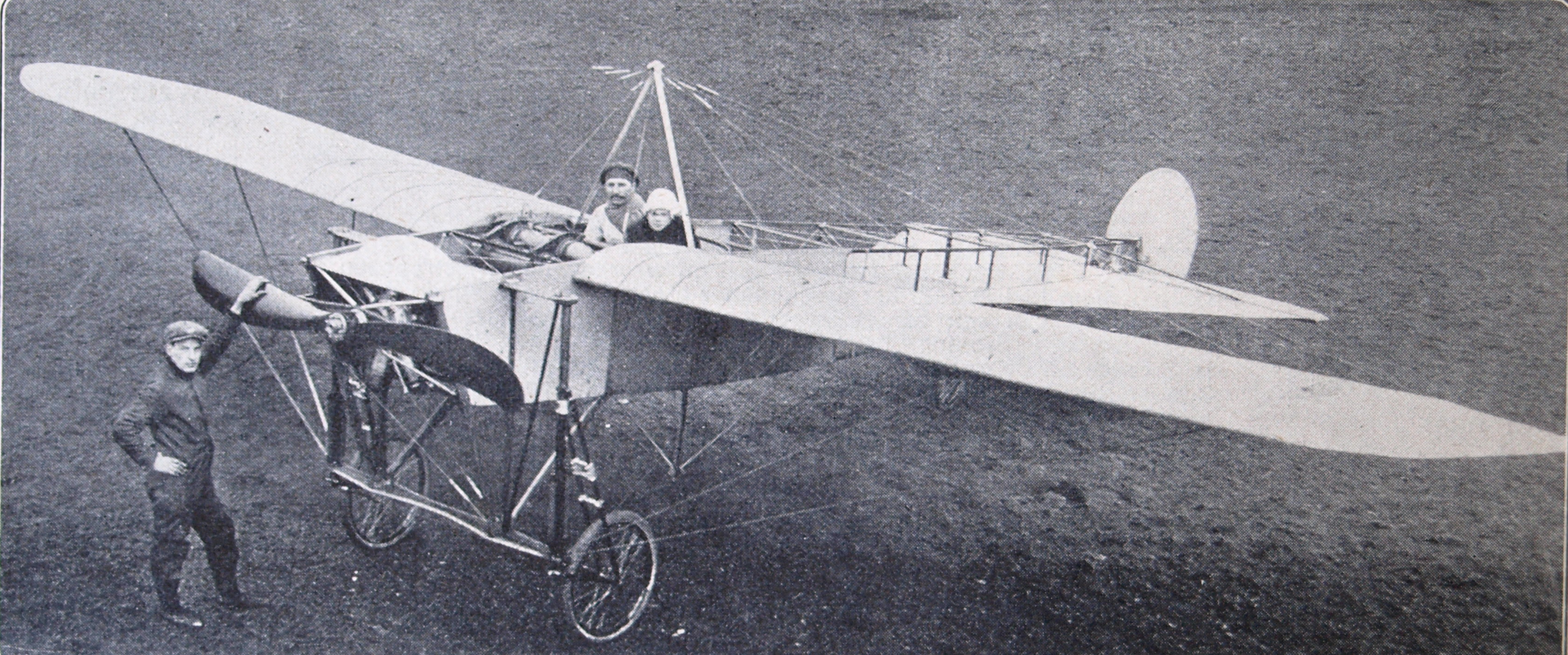
Blériot XI-2 bis

Blériot XI-2 bis "côte-à-côte"
February 1910 2-seat model, with side-by-side seating and a non-lifting triangular tailplane with semi-elliptical trailing-edge elevators, with several variations such as floats extended nose, modified tail-skid and other changes. (Length 8.32 m (27.3 ft), Wingspan 10.97 m (36.0 ft)

Blériot XI-2 Hydroaeroplane
Two-seater floatplane with wingspan of 11 m (36 ft) powered by a 60 kW (80 hp) Rhône engine. First flown with an extended rudder with a float on the bottom: this was later replaced by a standard rudder and a float fitted under the rear fuselage.

Blériot XI-2 Artillerie
Military Two-seater powered by a 70 hp (52 kW) Gnome 7 Gamma, with modified rudder and undercarriage. Two aircraft or versions of the same aircraft with differing elevators.

Blériot XI-2 Génie
Military version designed for easy transport, powered by a 70 hp (52 kW) Gnome 7 Gamma, it could be broken down/reassembled in 25 minutes.

Blériot XI-2 Vision totale
An XI-2 modified with a parasol wing in July 1914, also known as XI Brevet-Gouin.

Blériot XI-2 Hauteur
Powered by an 60 kW (80 hp) Gnome rotary piston engine and used by Roland Garros in altitude record flights in August 1912 and March 1913.

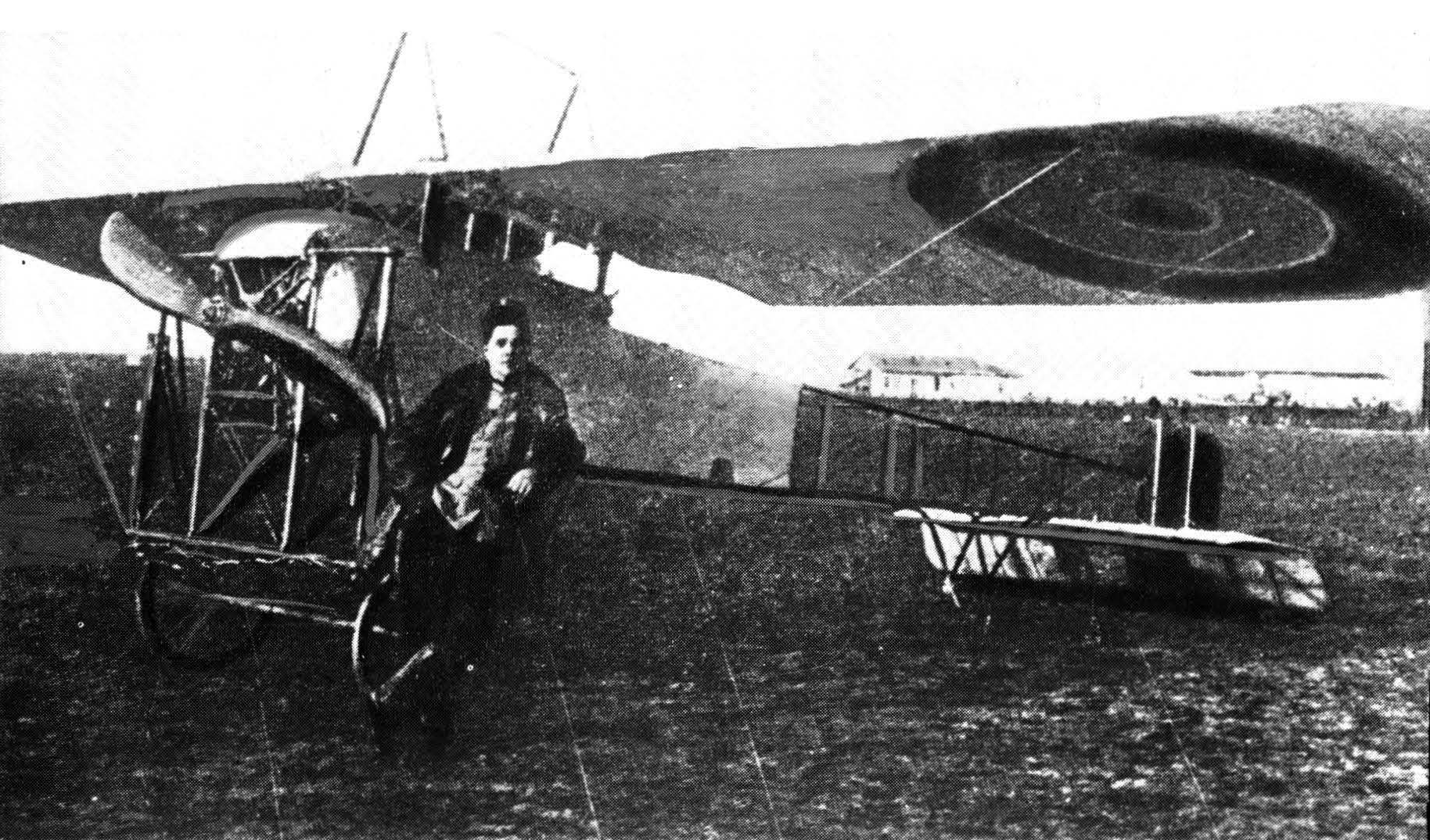
Blériot XI-2 BG

Blériot XI-2 BG
Two-seat high-wing parasol model.

Blériot XI-3 Concours Militaire
Tandem 3-seat model, powered by a twin-row 14-cylinder, 100 kW (140 hp) Gnome 14 Gamma-Gamma rotary engine. Span 11.35 m (37.2 ft), length 8.5 m (28 ft)

Thulin A
Licence-built in Sweden

== Military operators ==
Argentina

- Argentine Air Force

Australia

- Australian Flying Corps
  - Central Flying School AFC at Point Cook, Victoria

Belgium

- Belgian Air Component

Bolivia

- Bolivian Air Force

Brazil

- Brazilian Air Force

Bulgaria

- Bulgarian Air Force

Chile

- Chilean Air Force

Denmark

- Royal Danish Air Force

France

- French Navy

Greece

- Hellenic Air Force

Guatemala

- Guatemalan Air Force

Kingdom of Italy

- Corpo Aeronautico Militare

Japan

- Imperial Japanese Army Air Service

Mexico

- Mexican Air Force

Norway
Norwegian Army Air Service. One only: Tryggve Gran's
New Zealand
Royal New Zealand Air Force. One XI 2 Monoplane was in service from 1913 to 1914. The aircraft was named "Britiania", it was New Zealand's first military aircraft;
Romania

- Romanian Air Corps

Russia

- Imperial Russian Air Service

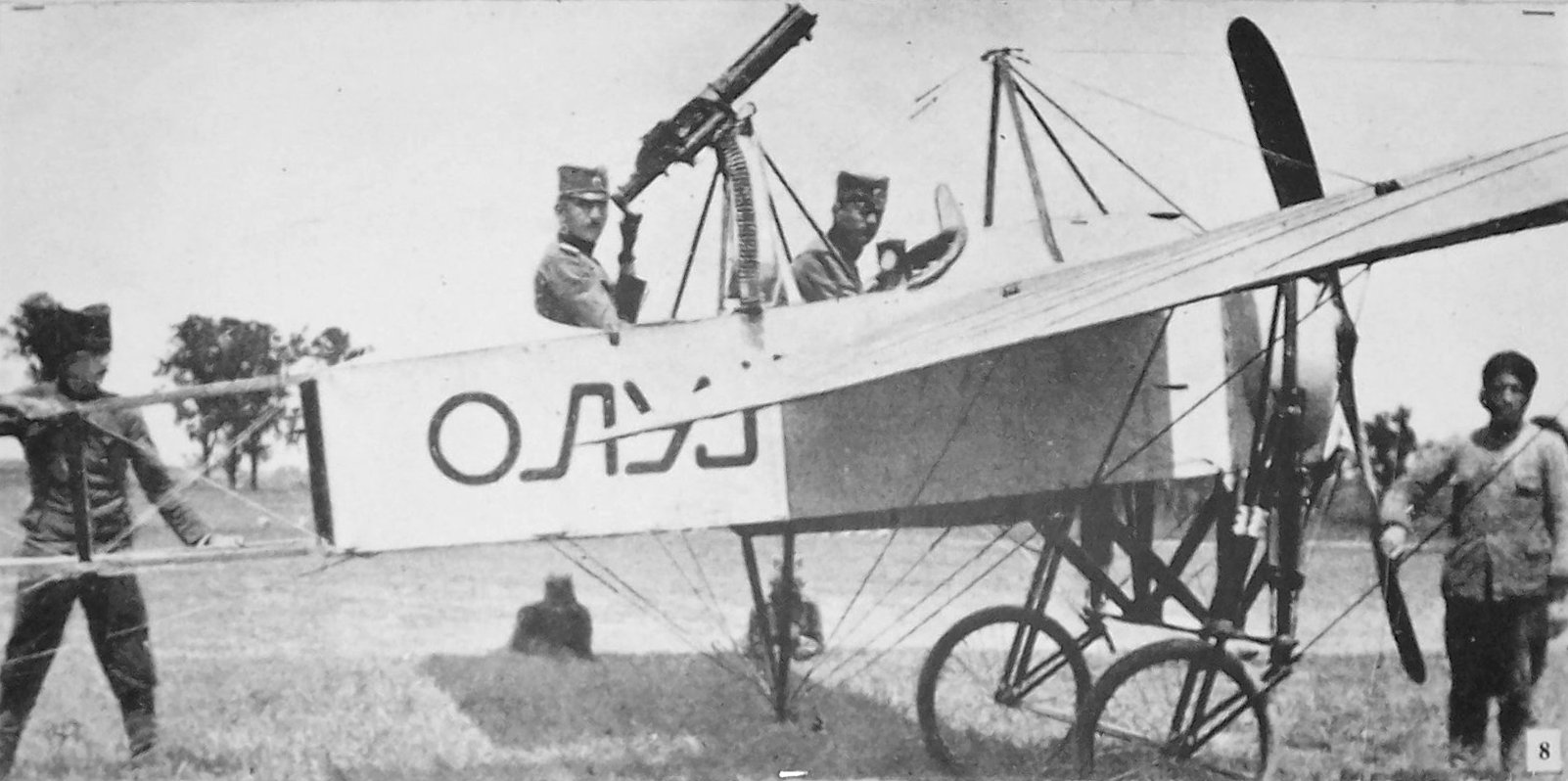
Blériot XI used by Serbia, 1915

(Kingdom of Serbia) Serbia

- Serbian Air Force and Air Defense

Sweden

- Swedish Air Force
- Swedish Navy

Switzerland

- Swiss Air Force

Ottoman Empire

- Ottoman Aviation squadrons

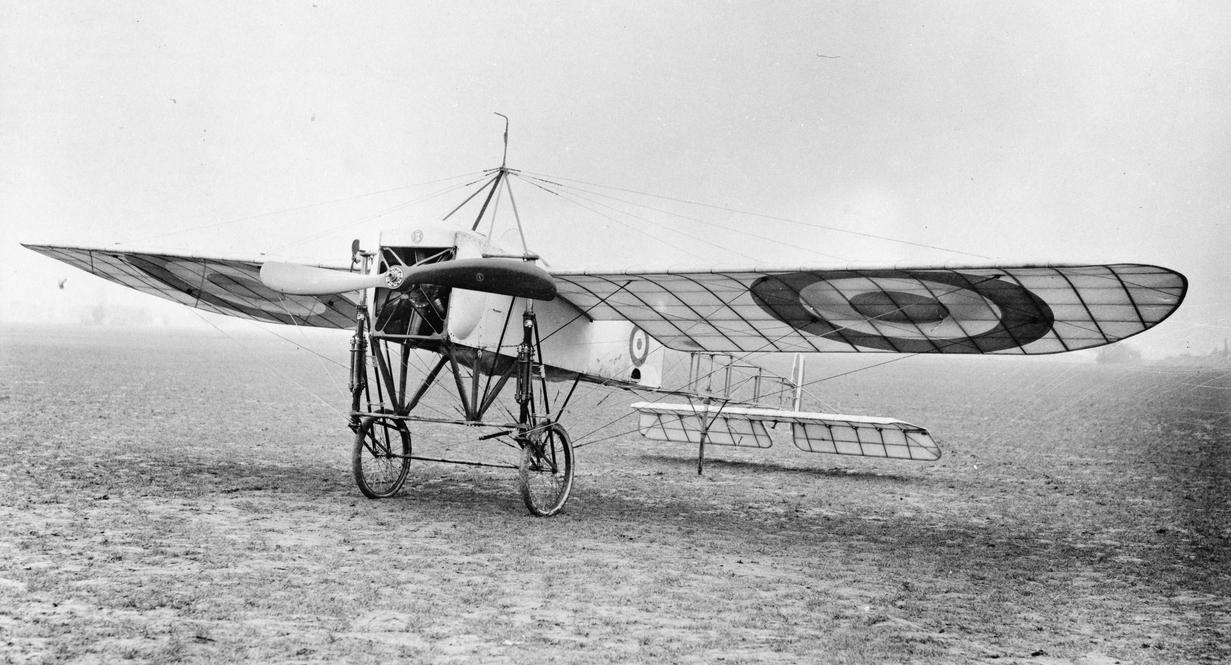
Blériot XI with RFC markings during World War 1.

United Kingdom

- Royal Flying Corps
  - No. 2 Squadron RFC
  - No. 3 Squadron RFC
  - No. 4 Squadron RFC
  - No. 5 Squadron RFC
  - No. 6 Squadron RFC
  - No. 9 Squadron RFC
  - No. 10 Squadron RFC
  - No. 16 Squadron RFC
  - No. 23 Squadron RFC
  - No. 24 Squadron RFC

Uruguay

- Uruguayan Air Force

== Surviving aircraft ==
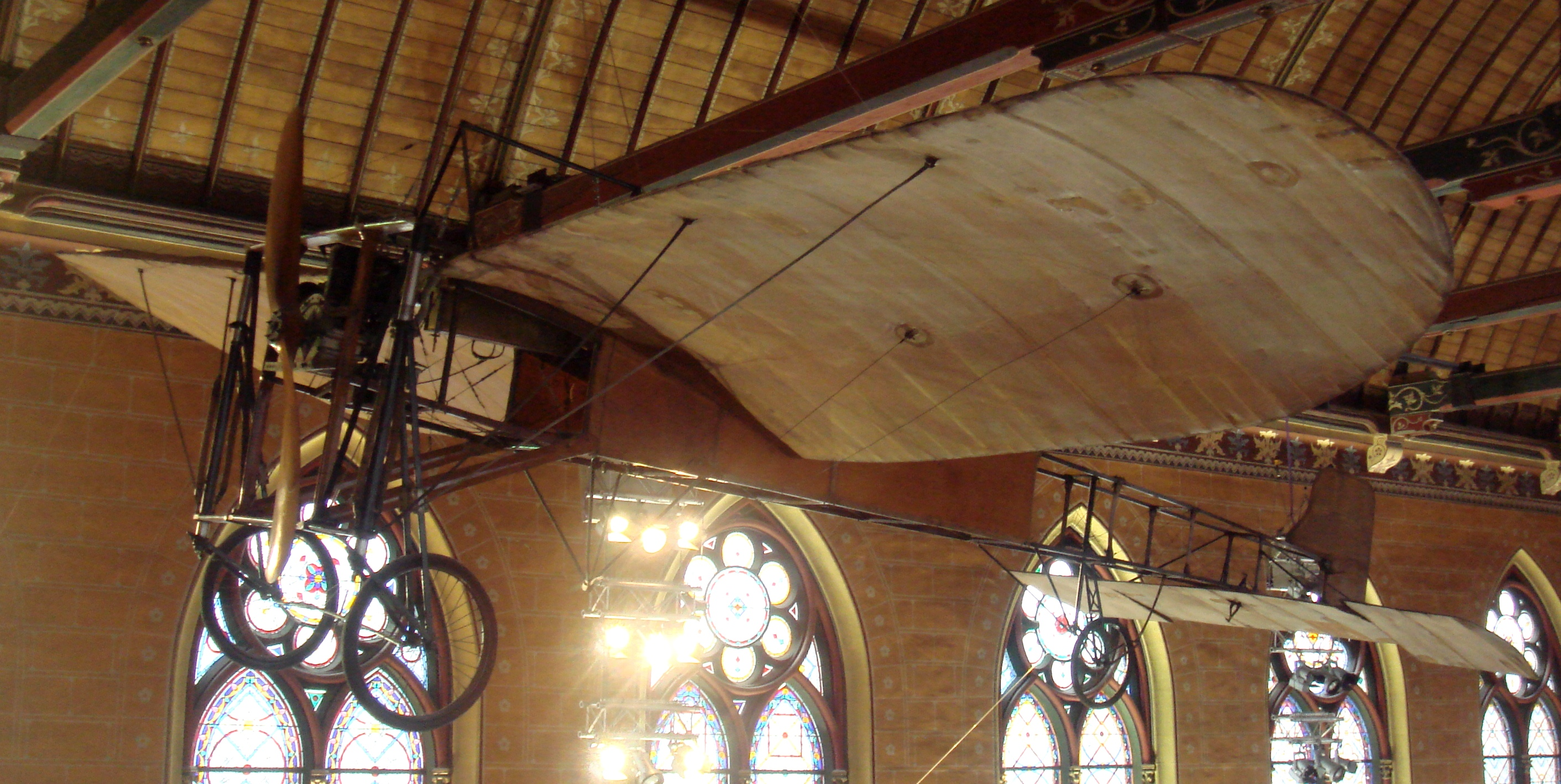
The original Blériot XI on which Louis Blériot crossed the Channel in 1909 in the Musée des Arts et Métiers, Paris.

In addition to the aircraft used by Louis Blériot to make his cross-channel flight in 1909, on display in the Musée des Arts et Métiers in Paris, a number of examples have been preserved. Both the British and American restored-to-airworthiness examples, each now over a century old and believed to be the two oldest flyable aircraft anywhere on Earth, are usually only "hopped" for short distances due to their uniqueness.

=== Airworthy aircraft ===
- 14 – Bleriot XI airworthy at the Shuttleworth Collection in Old Warden, Bedfordshire. Built in 1909 and now with the British civil registration G-AANG, this is the world's oldest airworthy aircraft. It is powered by a three-cylinder "W form" Anzani engine.
- 56 – Bleriot XI airworthy at the Old Rhinebeck Aerodrome in Red Hook, New York. It is powered by a 120°-angle regular "radial" Anzani three-cylinder engine and bears U.S. civil registration N60094. The front and back thirds of the fuselage are original.
- 1381 – Bleriot XI-2 bis on display at the Swedish National Museum of Science and Technology in Stockholm. A Blériot XI, the oldest airworthy museum aircraft in Sweden, manufactured in 1918 under licence by AETA, Enoch Thulins Aeroplane Works, in Landskrona, Sweden, as type Thulin A, has been owned by the museum since 1928. Following a two-year restoration by Mikael Carlson, the Blériot XI made what was probably its maiden flight to celebrate the Centenary of Flight in Sweden, at the Stockholm Festival of Flight on 20–22 August 2010. Registered with the Swedish Civil Air Traffic Authority in 2010 as SE-AEC, the Blériot uses its original rotary engine, a Thulin-built copy of the Gnome Omega.
- Reproduction – Bleriot XI airworthy at the Montreal Aviation Museum in Sainte-Anne-de-Bellevue, Quebec. It is a reproduction of the Blériot XI "Le Scarabée", flown over Montreal by Count Jacques de Lesseps in 1910, built by volunteers at the museum. They spent nearly 15 years building this exacting reproduction from original blueprints; its first flight took place in September 2014.
- Reproduction – Bleriot IX airworthy with Eric A. Presten in Vineburg, California.

=== Display aircraft ===
- 9 – Bleriot XI on static display at the New England Air Museum in Windsor Locks, Connecticut. It was built in 1911 by Ernest Hall and has a Detroit Aero engine.
- 76 – Bleriot XI on static display at the National Technical Museum in Prague. It was used by Jan Kašpar.
- 153 – Bleriot XI on static display at the Cradle of Aviation Museum in Garden City, New York. It was originally purchased by Rodman Wanamaker, is the first aircraft to be imported into America, and was acquired from the Old Rhinebeck Aerodrome.
- 164 – Bleriot XI on static display at the Royal Air Force Museum London in London. It has a reproduction fuselage and a six-cylinder Anzani engine installed.
- 686 – Bleriot XI-2 on static display at the Musée de l'Air et de l'Espace in Paris.
- 3856 – Bleriot XI on static display at the Old Rhinebeck Aerodrome in Red Hook, New York. It was built in the US in 1911 by the American Aeroplane & Supply House of Hempstead, New York as a "cross-country" longer-ranged version with a copper ventral fuel tank, and had been in storage at least since November 1915 before its discovery in 1963, and restored in 1975–76 by Cole Palen. It was previously flown at the museum with its pre-Monosoupape, seven-cylinder 70 HP Gnome engine. It was on display for a period of time at the USS Intrepid Sea-Air-Space Museum in New York City.
- Unknown ID – Bleriot XI on static display at the Musée des Arts et Métiers in Paris. This is the original Type XI aircraft that Louis Blériot flew across the English Channel on 25 July 1909.
- Unknown ID – Bleriot XI on static display at the Musée de l'Air et de l'Espace in Paris.
- Unknown ID – Bleriot XI on static display at the National Air and Space Museum in Washington, D.C. This aircraft was manufactured in 1914, purchased by Swiss pilot John Domenjoz, and has a 37 kW (50 hp) Gnôme engine installed.

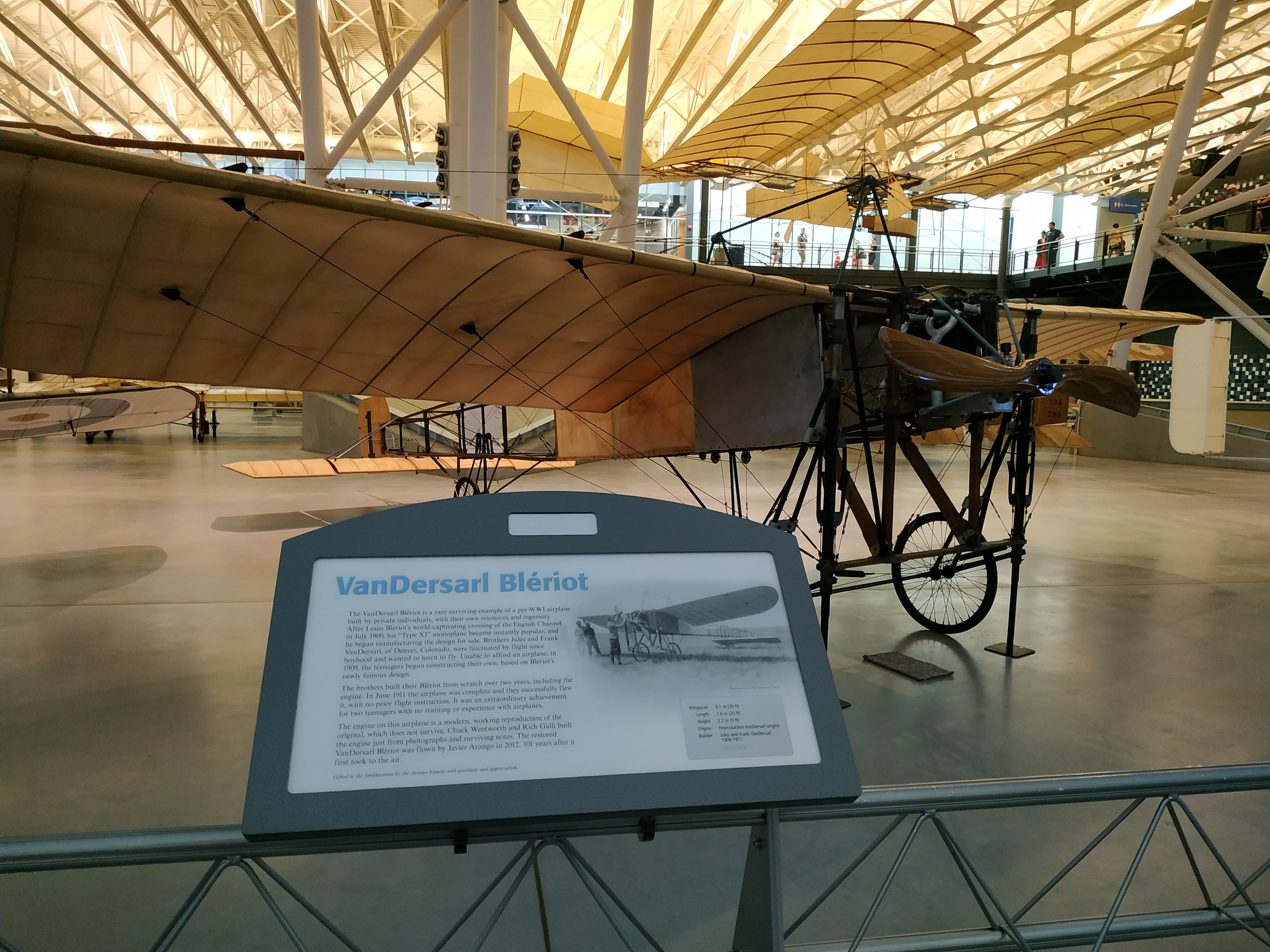
The VanDersarl Bleriot

- Unknown ID – VanDersarl Bleriot on display at the National Air and Space Museum in Chantilly, VA. It was built by teenage brothers Jules and Frank A. Van Dersarl of Denver, Colorado. Beginning in 1909, the brothers constructed the aircraft from scratch, including the engine, leading to successful flights with no prior flight instruction in June, 1911. It was successfully restored and flown by Javier Arrango in 2011.
- Unknown ID – Bleriot XI on static display at the Canada Aviation and Space Museum in Ottawa, Ontario. It was license built by the California Aeroplane Manufacturing and Supply Company in 1911 for John W. Hamilton and has an Elbridge Aero Special 60 hp engine installed.
- Unknown ID – Bleriot XI Mk II "Looper" on static display at the Powerhouse Museum in Sydney. This aircraft was flown by Maurice Guillaux with first Australian airmail from Melbourne to Sydney in 1914.
- Unknown ID – Bleriot XI on static display at the Deutsches Museum in Munich, Bavaria.
- Unknown ID – Bleriot XI on static display at the Museo del Aire in Madrid. Originally owned by S. García Cames, it was rebuilt by Juan Vilanova and Luis Acedo and has been on display at the museum since 1968.
- Unknown ID – Monoplane on static display at the National Museum of the United States Air Force in Dayton, Ohio. It was built by Ernest C. Hall in 1911, who donated it to the museum in 1969.
- Unknown ID – Bleriot XI on static display at the Museo Nacional de Aeronáutica de Argentina in Morón, Buenos Aires. The aircraft has replica wings and is powered by a "W" three-cylinder Anzani 25 hp engine.
- Unknown ID – Bleriot XI on static display at the Flieger Flab Museum in Dübendorf, Switzerland. The aircraft was manufactured in 1914
- Reproduction – Bleriot IX on static display at the South Yorkshire Aircraft Museum in Doncaster, South Yorkshire.
- Replica – Bleriot XI on static display at the Brooklands Museum in Weybridge, Surrey.
- Replica – Bleriot XI on static display at Flugausstellung Hermeskeil in Hermeskeil, Rhineland-Palatinate.
- Replica – Bleriot XI on static display at the College Park Aviation Museum in College Park, Maryland.
- Replica – Bleriot XIII on static display at the United States Army Aviation Museum at Fort Novosel near Ozark, Alabama. It is one of the first known replicas and was built in the 1930s.
- Replica – Bleriot XI on static display at the Queen Victoria Museum and Art Gallery at Inveresk in Launceston, Tasmania. Fitted with an original radial Anzani aero engine and replica propeller. The aircraft was built by students from Burnie Tafe in 2003 and was flown at the Devonport Airshow.

== Specifications (Blériot XI) ==
Blériot XI

Data from Angelucci

General characteristics

- Crew: 1
- Length: 7.62 m (25 ft 0 in)
- Wingspan: 7.79 m (25 ft 7 in)
- Height: 2.69 m (8 ft 10 in)
- Wing area: 14 m^{2} (150 sq ft)
- Empty weight: 230 kg (507 lb)
- Powerplant: 1 × Anzani 3-cyl. fan 3-cyl. air-cooled fan-style radial piston engine, 19 kW (25 hp)
- Propellers: 2-bladed Chauvière Intégrale, 2.08 m (6 ft 10 in) diameter

Performance

- Maximum speed: 75.6 km/h (47.0 mph, 40.8 kn)
- Service ceiling: 1,000 m (3,300 ft)
