= Circuit de l'Est =

1910 air race

The Circuit de l'Est ("Eastern Circuit") was a six-stage air race organized by the newspaper Le Matin, which took place in August 1910. General Ferdinand Foch, who had followed the race attentively, declared a few weeks later to the Le Matin delegate, Robert de Beauplanduring the French Army's first aerial maneuvers in Picardy : "All that, you see, is sport: but for the army, the air force, it's zero".

== Competition ==
The race started from the Issy-lès-Moulineaux aerodrome and took place in six stages along the route Paris – Troyes – Nancy - Mézières – Douai – Amiens – Paris. The French Army aviation service, the Service Aéronautique committed three crews to the event. Thirty-five contestants entered the race, of which only 10 managed to start.

Alfred Leblanc won the race and the prize of 100,000 francs reserved for the winner (equivalent to approximately €366,000 in 2017), covering the 805-kilometre (500 mi) course in 12 hours 1 minute 1 second of flying time at an average speed of 66.99 kilometres per hour (41.63 mph). Émile Aubrun finished second. Each of them piloted a Blériot XI monoplane powered by a 50-horsepower (37 kW) Gnome engine. They were the only finishers.

Flying a Farman II biplane, Georges Legagneux only managed to finish four of the six stages in the time limit set for each, but he completed all six stages and was the third competitor to do so and the first in a biplane. At the Troyes stage, he was the only competitor to take to the air during the rest day there and made a flight to entertain the public. At Mézières, he was the first to take off for the fourth stage despite a strong wind that many observers thought would make a takeoff impossible, and accomplished what Frantz Reichel, a correspondent for Le Figaro, described as a "fantastic journey," landing five times along the way, including one for lunch with fellow competitor Julien Mamet — who had broken a wheel of his Blériot XI — and was prevented from reaching Douai within the time limit only by a lack of fuel. During the final stage, he took time to land along the way for lunch and to make a short flight over Puteaux, his home town. His flying skill and his sense of spectacle enthused the commentators: "If he exceeded the assigned time limits for two of the stages, he nevertheless completed the entire circuit. His numerous and easy stopovers, decided according to the circumstances or the whim of the moment, in open fields, in unprepared locations, attest [to] his personal skill," wrote L'Aérophile in its edition of 1 September 1910. Comparing him to Leblanc and Aubrun, Reichel in Le Figaro praised his whims as "almost conclusive" as to the possibilities of aviation.

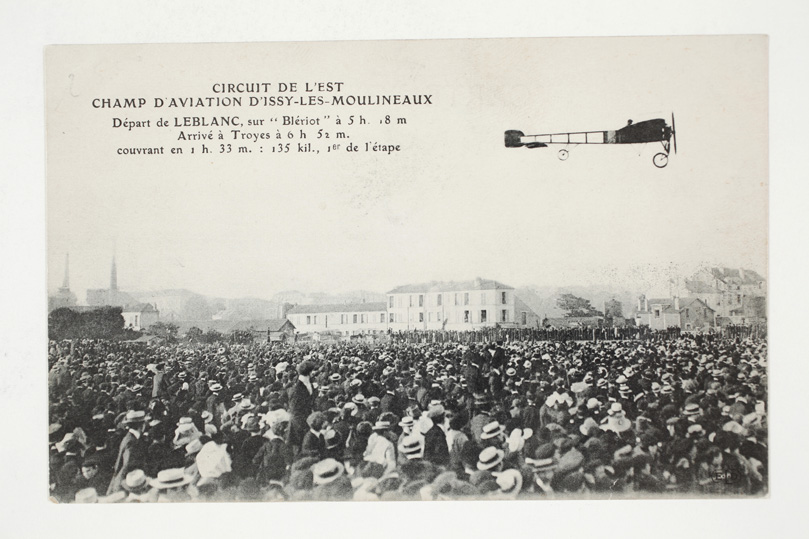
Departure of Alfred Leblanc in a Blériot XI from Issy-les-Moulineaux aerodrome at Paris.

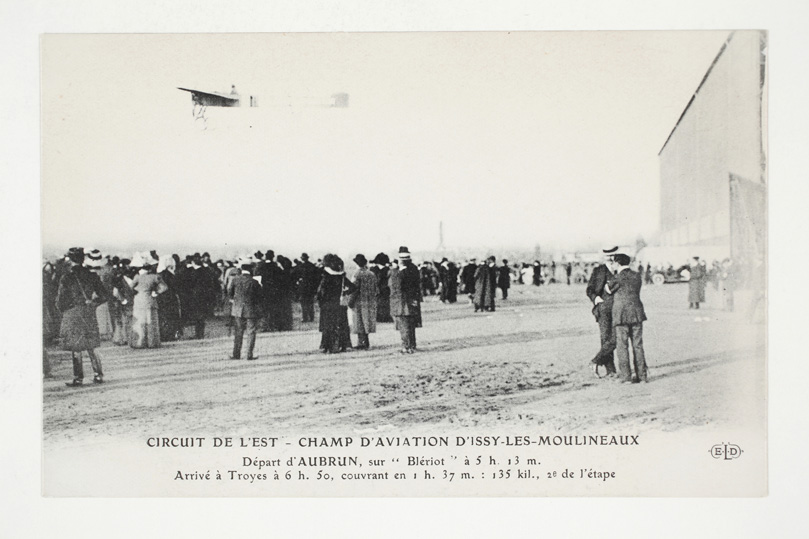
Departure of Émile Aubrun in a Blériot XI.

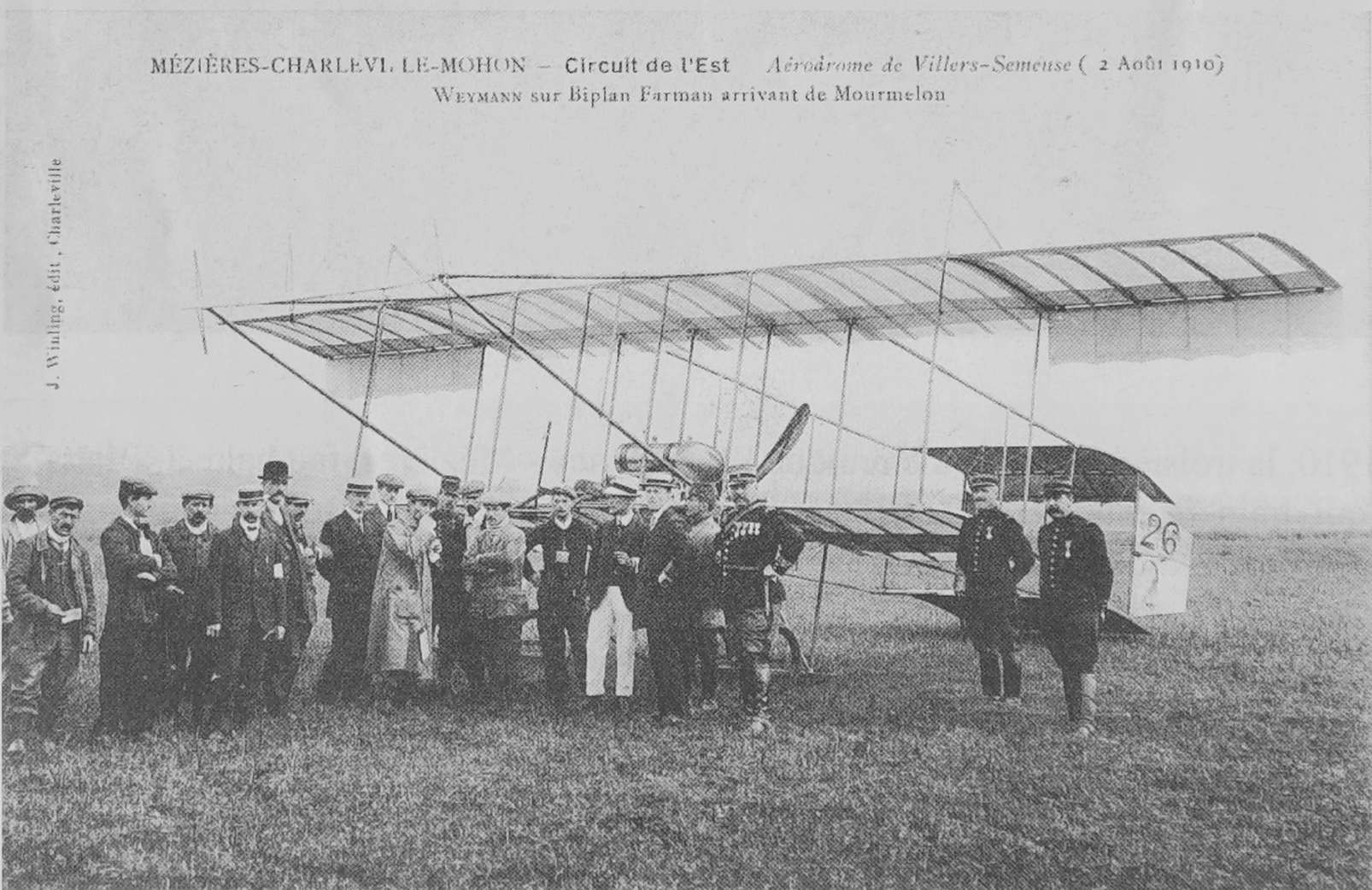
Charles Terres Weymann at Charleville.

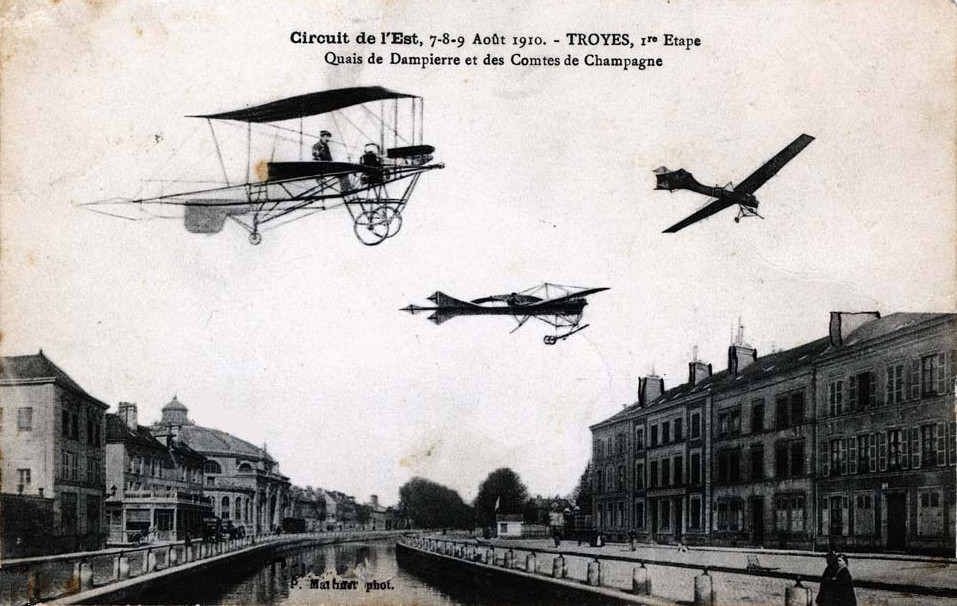
Troyes.

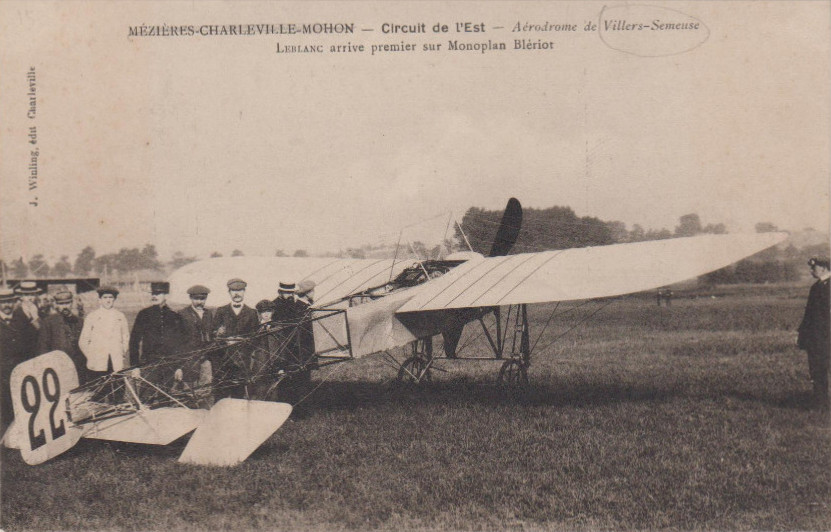
Alfred Leblanc arrives first in a Blériot XI.

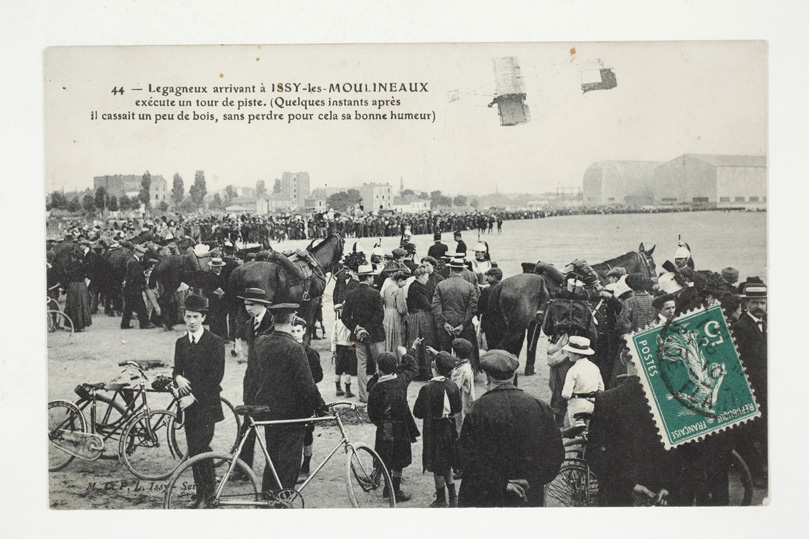
Georges Legagneux's arrival at Issy-les-Moulineaux in a Farman II.

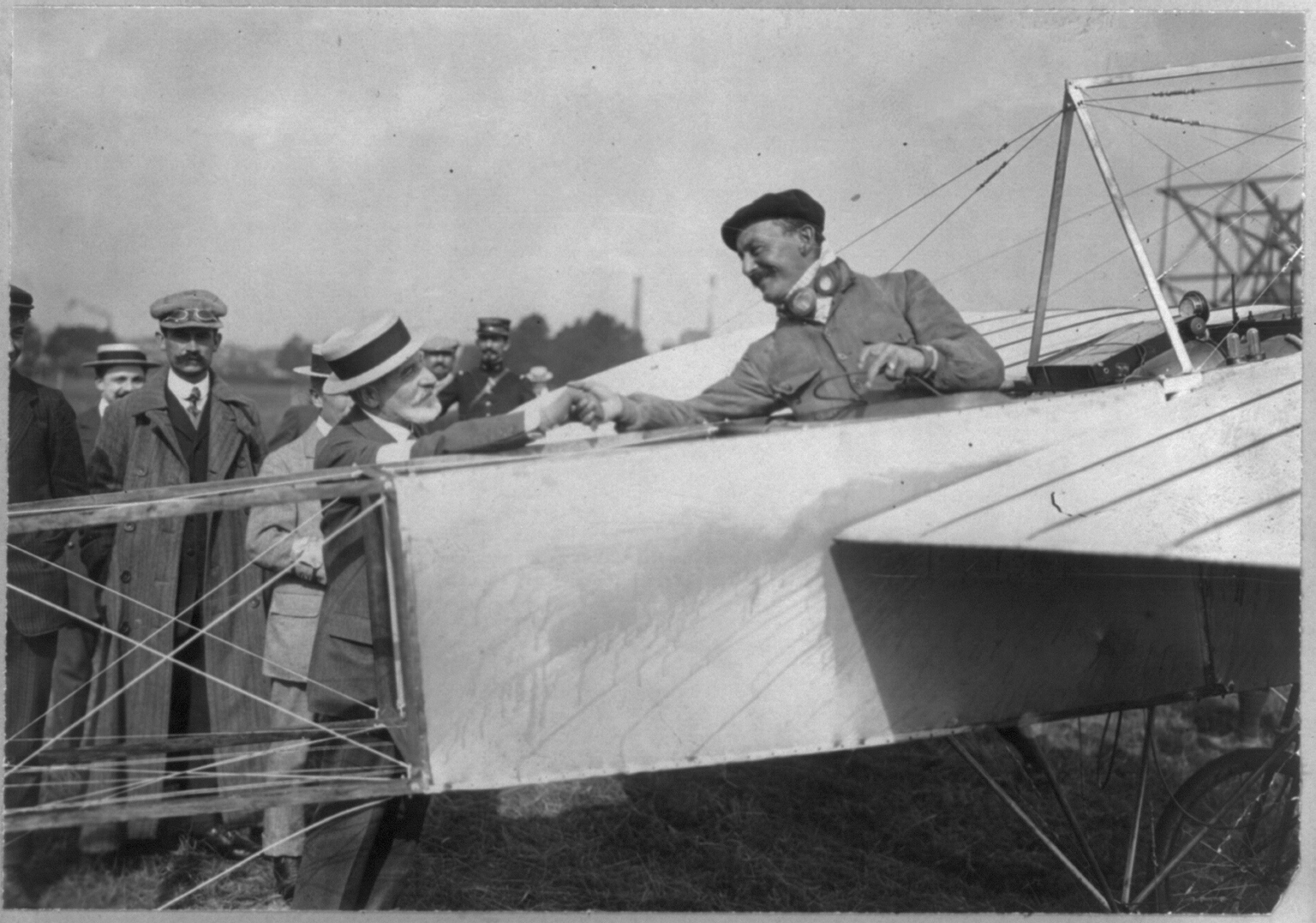
Alfred LeBlanc congratulated by Henry Deutsch de la Meurthe, at Nancy.
