= Vineburg, California =

Unincorporated community in California, United States

- Unincorporated community
- Location within California Location within the United States
- Coordinates: 38°16′21″N 122°26′19″W
- Country: United States
- State: California
- County: Sonoma
- Elevation: 52 ft (16 m)
- Time zone: UTC-8 (Pacific (PST))
  - Summer (DST): UTC-7 (PDT)
- ZIP code: 95487
- Area code: 707
- GNIS feature ID: 237091

Vineburg is an unincorporated community in Sonoma County, California, United States. Vineburg is 2 miles (3.2 km) southeast of Sonoma. Vineburg has a post office which was established in 1897.

Vineburg began in the late 1870s as a stop on the Sonoma Valley Railroad, which would later become a branch of the Northwestern Pacific Railroad. The town was originally a major shipping point for locally-raised apples, pears, and eggs. After the railroad was abandoned, the town began "gradually losing its identity" as distinct from nearby Sonoma, with its agricultural facilities giving way to light industry.
