= Émile Aubrun =

French aviator (1881–1967)

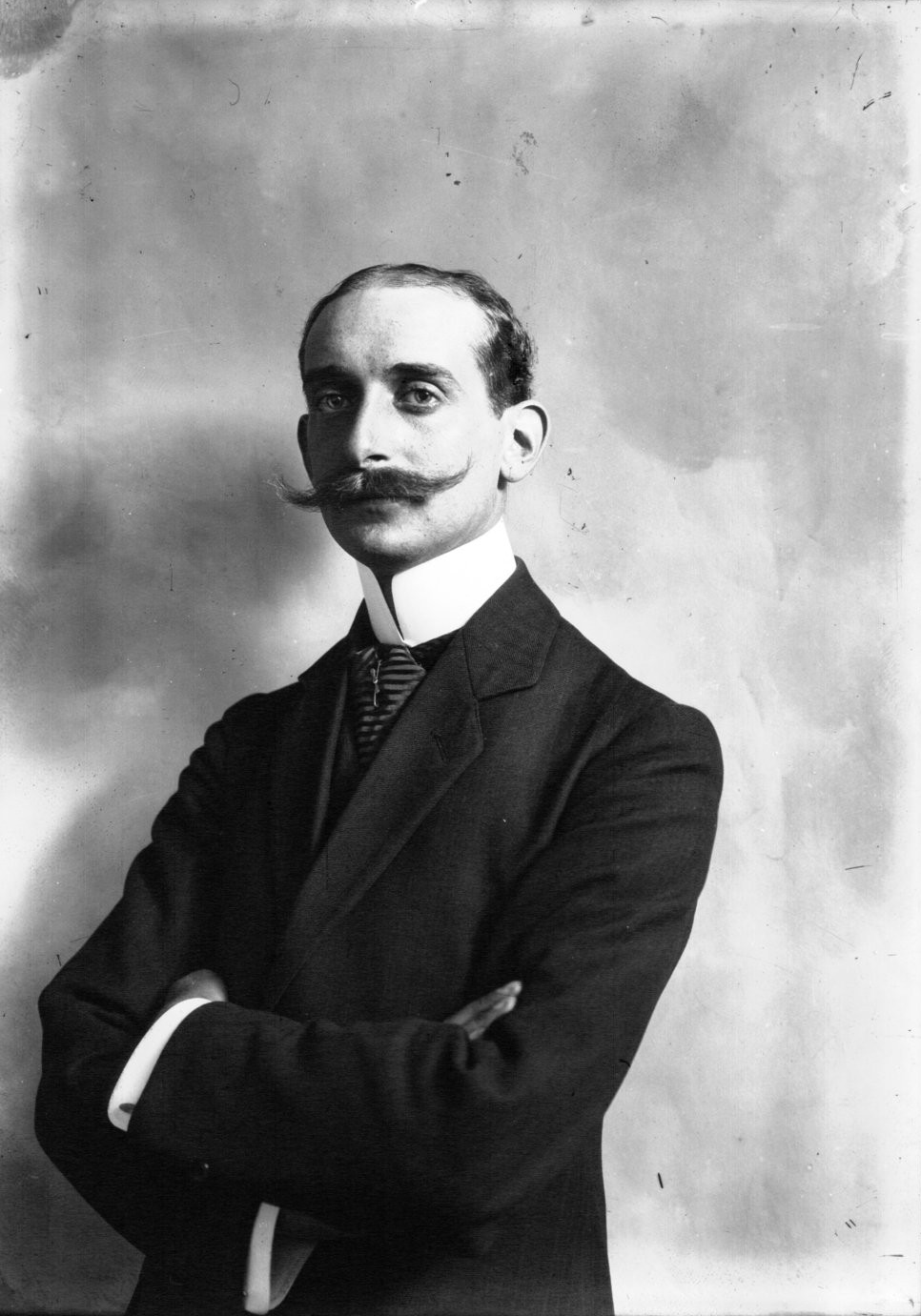
- Aubrun in 1910
- Born: Émile Eugène Aubrun; 25 August 1881; Brunoy, France
- Died: 14 November 1967 (aged 86)
- Occupation: Aircraft pilot
- Years active: 1910–1920
- Known for: Circuit de l'Est

Émile Eugène Aubrun (25 August 1881 – 14 November 1967) was a French aviator who received national attention for finishing second in the 1910 Circuit de l'Est.

== Early life ==
Émile Eugène Aubrun was born on 25 August 1881, in Brunoy, France. In 1909 he served an aviator apprenticeship while attending the Blériot school, in Pau, France. He graduated with a degree in engineering and he became interested in aviation. He received his pilot license from the Aéro-Club de France on 6 January 1910.

== Career ==
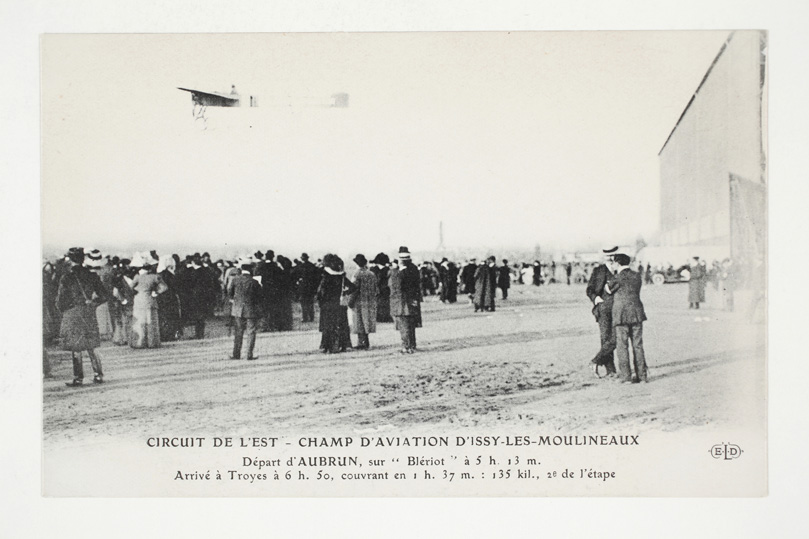
Departure of Émile Aubrun piloting a Blériot XI

In August 1910 he competed in the Circuit de l'Est and flew a Blériot XI monoplane aircraft with a 50 hp Gnome engine. The sixth stage of the race passed The Golden Virgin in Albert, Somme. Aubrun used the sculpture as a compass and it was referred to in news as the "famous golden virgin". He flew circles around the sculpture with his Blériot XI aircraft in order to get a closer look. When asked about his laps around the statue he said,

Not having occasion to see such a site every day, I made the best of it and examined the statue from near at hand making several circles round it.

Alfred Leblanc won the race and Aubrun finished second. Thirty-five people had entered the race and Leblanc and Aubrun were the only two pilots to finish. The race finished at Issy-les-Moulineaux, and 200,000 spectators were gathered to see the finish. In 1910 he participated in the International Aviation Meet at Belmont Park: an event and the prizes were valued at US$72,300 (equivalent to $2,500,000 in 2025).

In 1910 The New York Times reported that Aubrun broke a record for flying 55.5 miles per hour over 180 miles. He finished in 3 hours 33 minutes and seven seconds.

In 1911, he was director of the flying school established in Reims by Deperdussin. During the First World War he worked in aeronautical construction. After the war he served in the aircraft control office. It was there that he pioneered the use of airplanes to reveal submarines which were underwater, and the rescue of submarine crews. In 1912 he was involved with experiments regarding the use of airplanes to explore the sea.

=== Awards ===
- Officer of the Legion of Honor

== Gallery ==
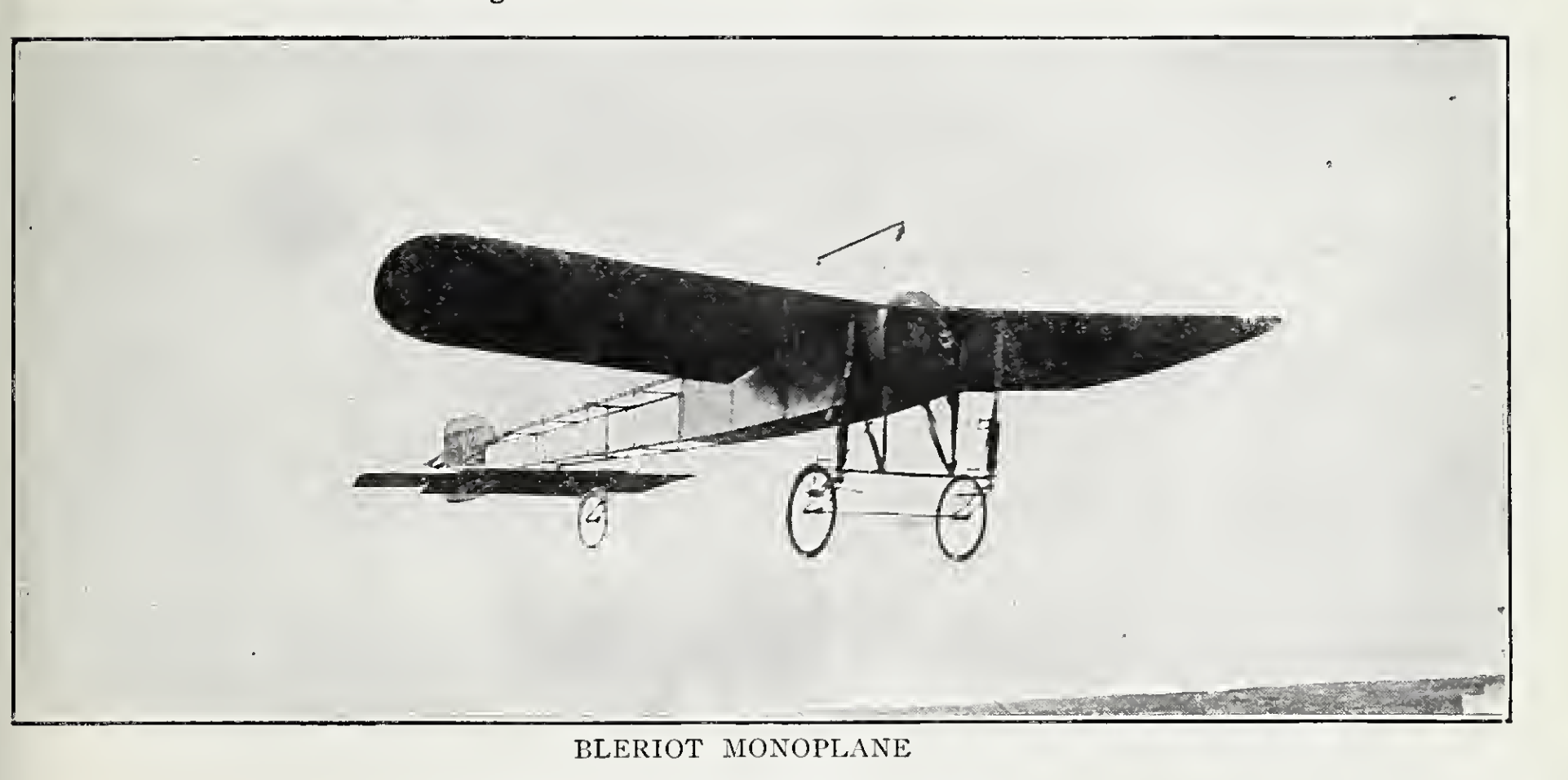
1910 Bleriot monoplane

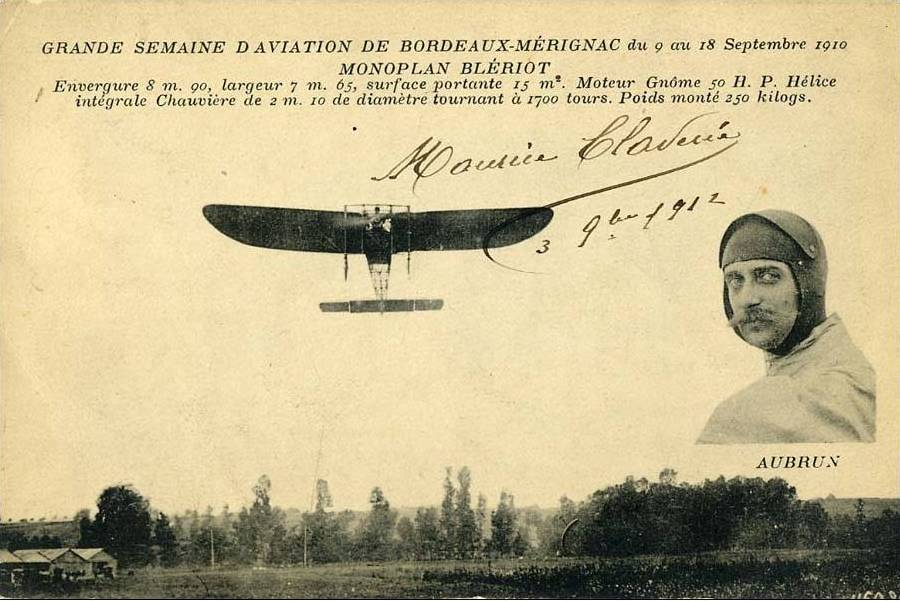
Bordeaux Beau-desert-Mérignac aviation week September 1910

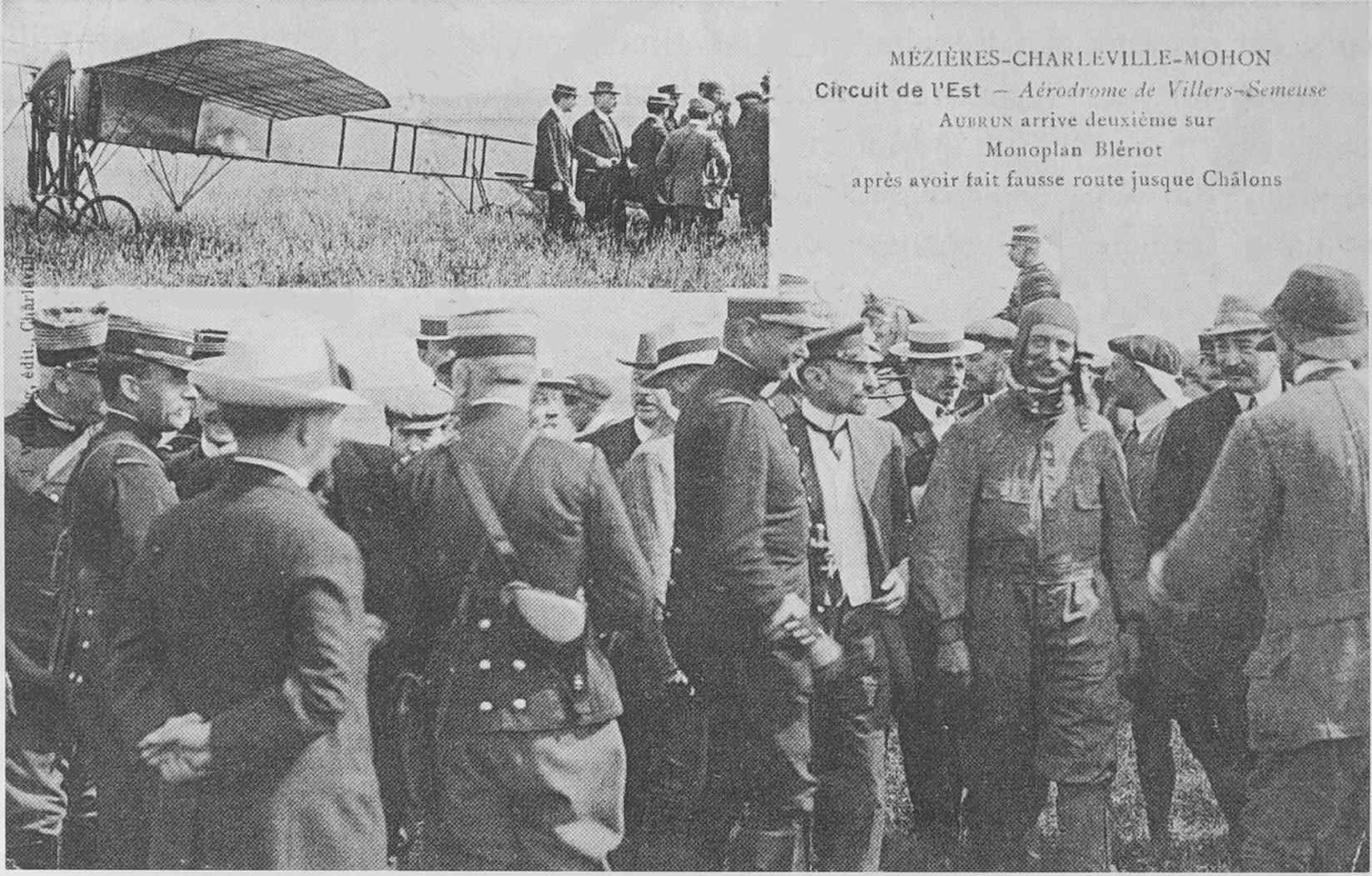
Circuit de l'Est 1910

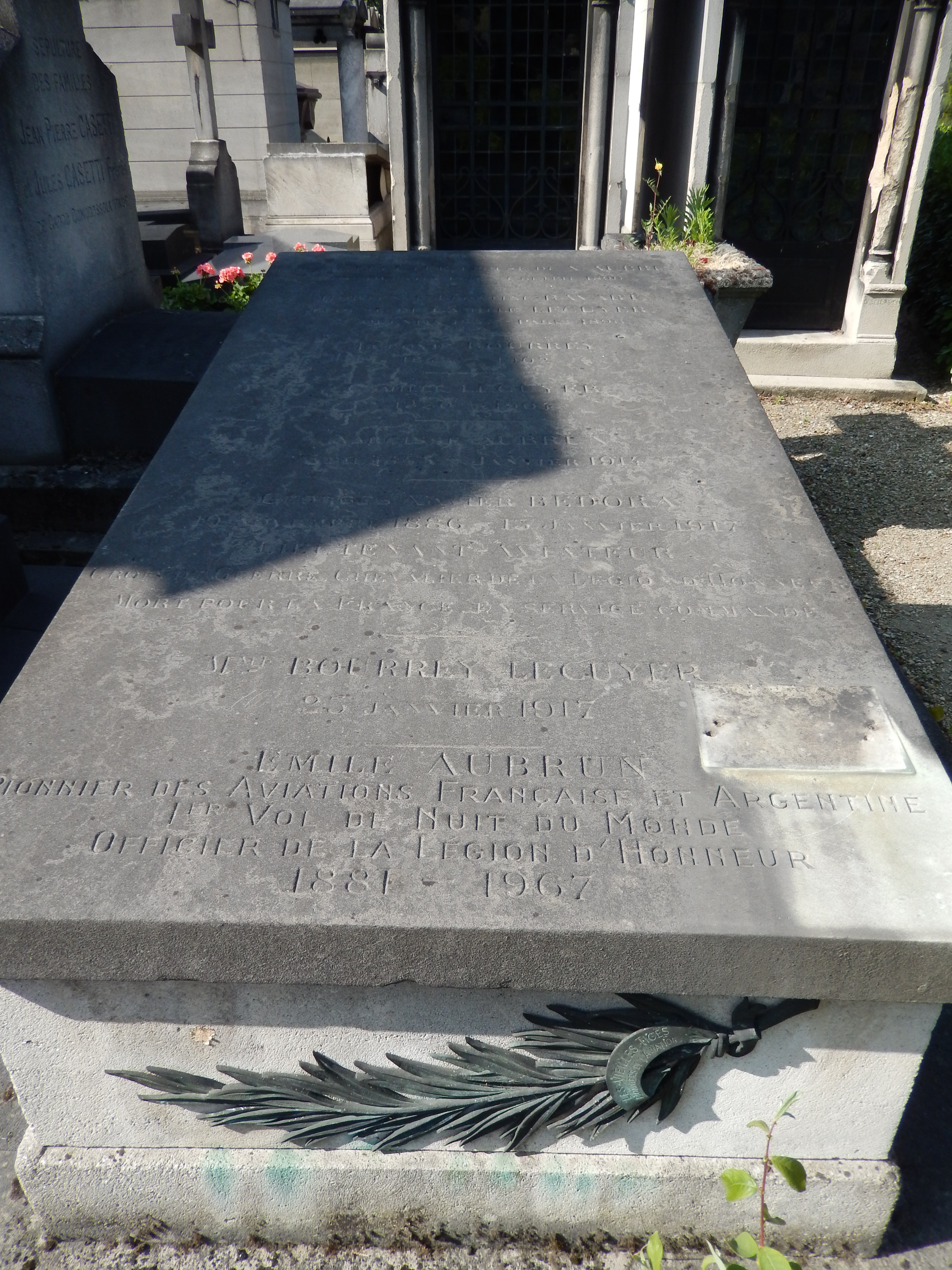
Tombe de Emile Aubrun (cimetière de Montmartre)

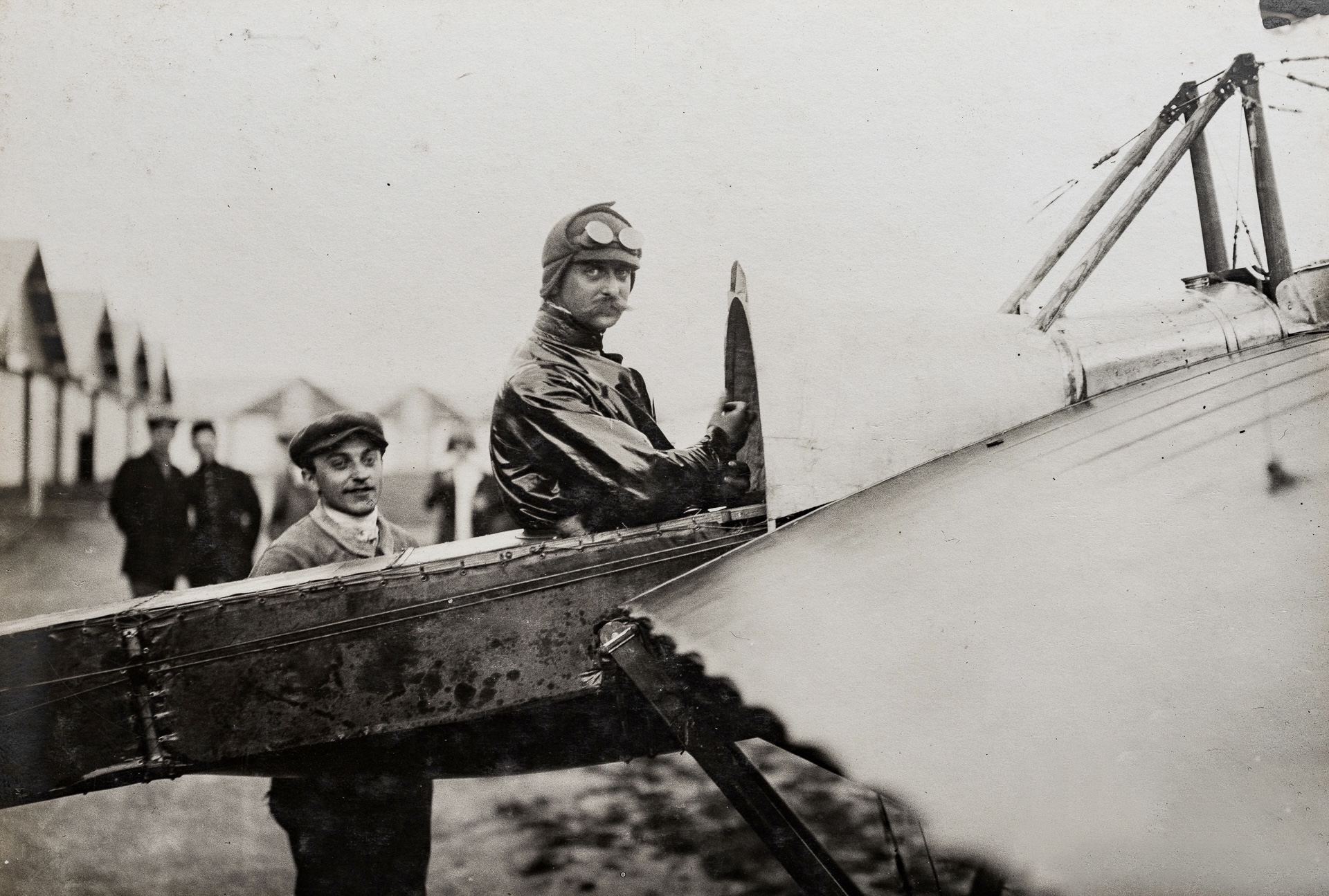
Émile Aubrun at the controls of a Deperdussin 1910

== See also ==
- List of pilots awarded an Aviator's Certificate by the Aéro-Club de France in 1910
