= Alfred Leblanc =

20th century French aviator

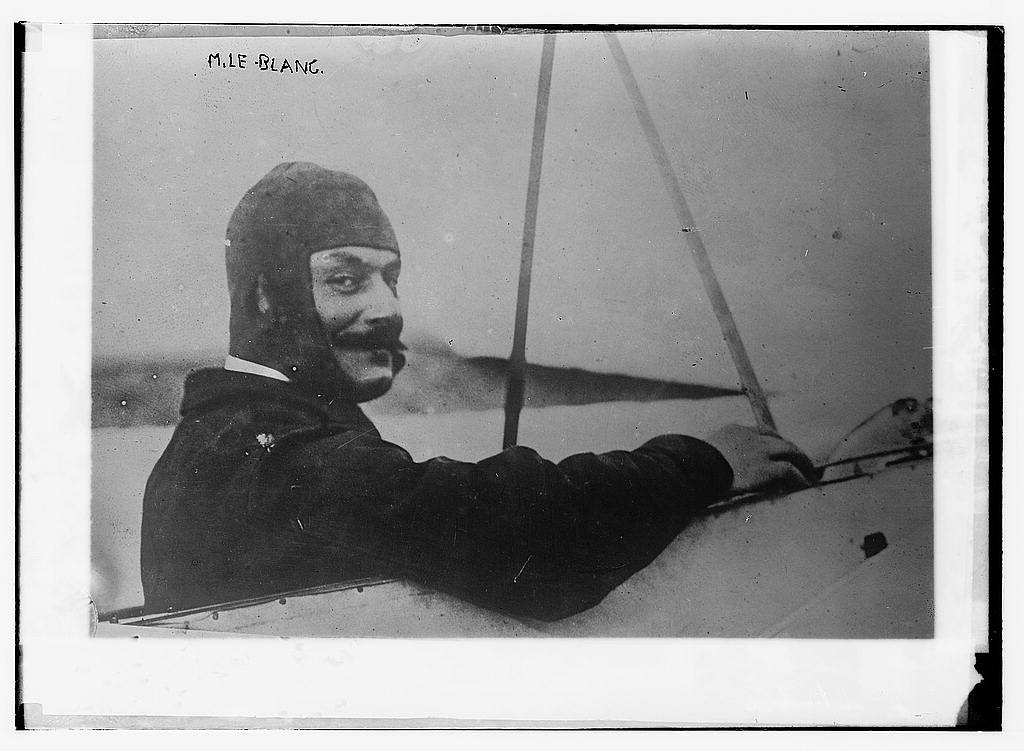
- Alfred Leblanc in the cockpit, c.1915
- Born: Émile Eugène Aubrun; April 13, 1869; Paris FR
- Died: November 22, 1921 (aged 52)
- Occupation: Aircraft pilot
- Years active: 1910-1920
- Known for: Circuit de l'Est

Alfred Leblanc (13 April 1869 – 22 November 1921) was a pioneer French aviator.

== Early life ==
He was born on 13 April 1869 in Paris. In 1888, he became the technical director of the Victor Bidault metal foundry. A keen sportsman, he was an energetic secretary general of the oldest gymnastic society in Paris, that of the XVIieme arrondissement. He became interested in the sport of ballooning, rapidly becoming a successful competitor in the races organised by the Aéro-Club de France

== Biography ==
He later became associated with Louis Blériot, and handled the logistics for Blériot for his cross channel flight of July 25, 1909. He then became the first person to buy a copy of Blériot's aircraft, and also the first pupil at the flying schools which Blériot established, becoming the second person to qualify for an AeCF pilots license through a flight test. (The first licenses were given to prominent aviators without any formal test) He later became one of the chief instructors, and also made proving flights of newly produced Blériot aircraft.

He was placed second in the 1909 Gordon Bennett Cup for balloons.

In August 1910, flying a Gnome-engined Blériot XI, he won the Circuit de l'Est, covering the 805 km (500 mi) in 12hr 1 min 1 sec, an average speed of 66.99 km/h (41.63 mph) Leblanc was first in the race and Émile Aubrun finished second. The race finished at Issy-les-Moulineaux, and 200,000 spectators were gathered to see the finish.

In November 1910, he represented France in the Gordon Bennett Trophy race for airplanes, held in New York, but misjudged a turn on his last lap, and crashed: had he not done so, he would have won the competition, which was won by Claude Grahame-White, also flying a Blériot.

During the first World War, he was the general manager of the Blériot factory at Suresnes.

In 1919, he was appointed manager of the Compagnie des Messageries Aeriennes, an airline formed by the major French aircraft manufacturers in order to create a civil aviation market, and he was also put in charge of the Societe des Stocks, which was formed to dispose of the large number of surplus aircraft and aero-engines resulting from the end of the First World War.

He died 22 November 1921.

== Awards ==
- Officer of the Legion of Honor (1920)

== Records ==
- 1910 – flight airspeed record for 1 mile.
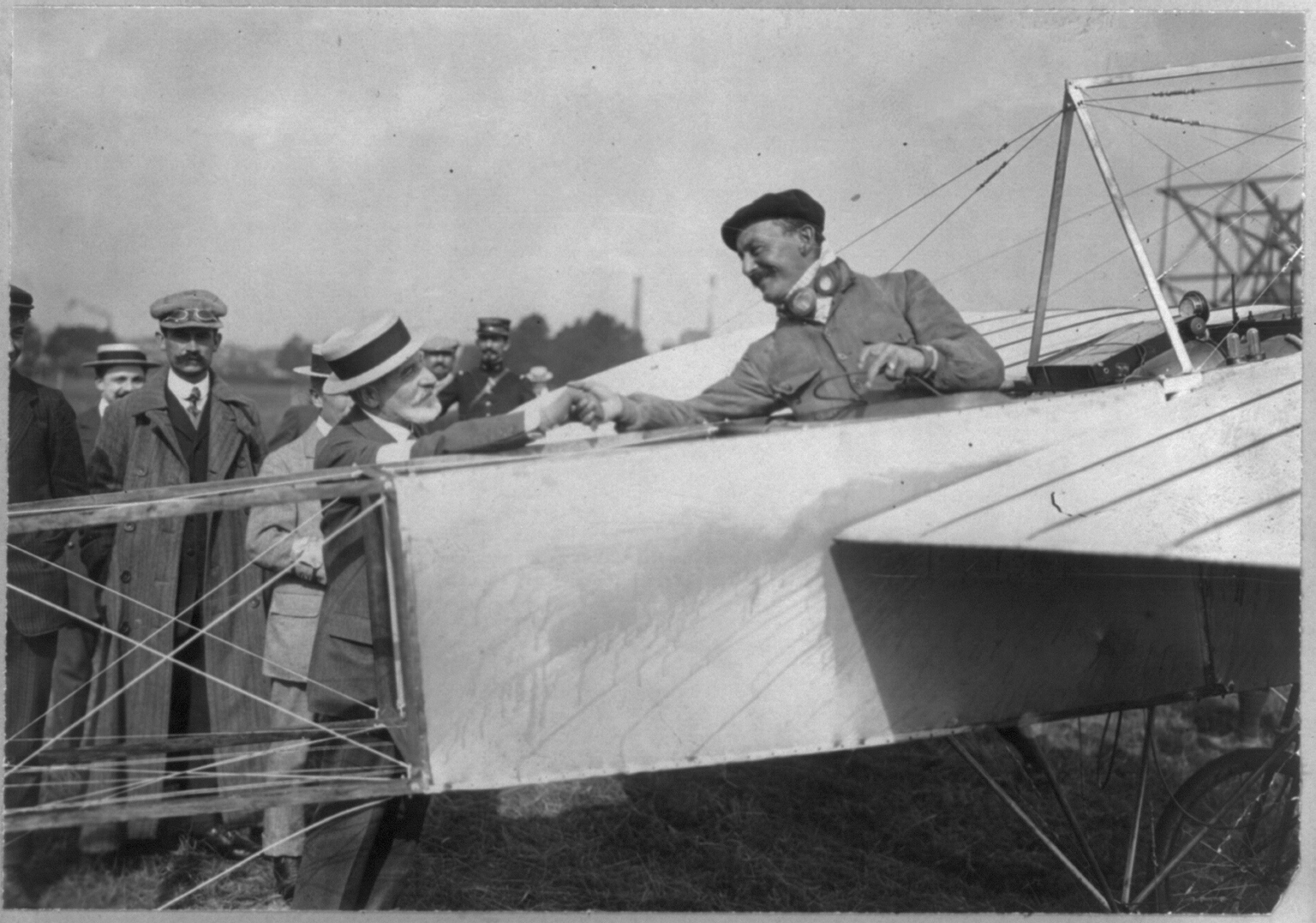
Leblanc in his Blériot, being congratulated by Henri Deutsch de la Meurthe, at Nancy, France after the Circuit de l'Est d'Aviation

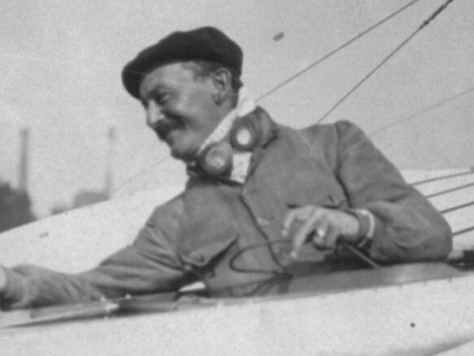

== See also ==
- List of pilots awarded an Aviator's Certificate by the Aéro-Club de France in 1909
