= Julia Clark =

American aviation pioneer and the first American woman pilot to die flying an airplane

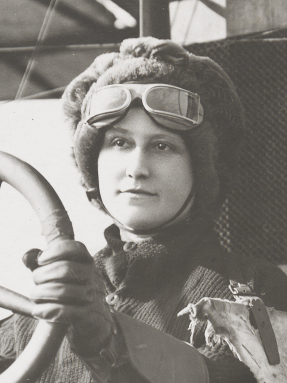
Julia Clark, circa 1911

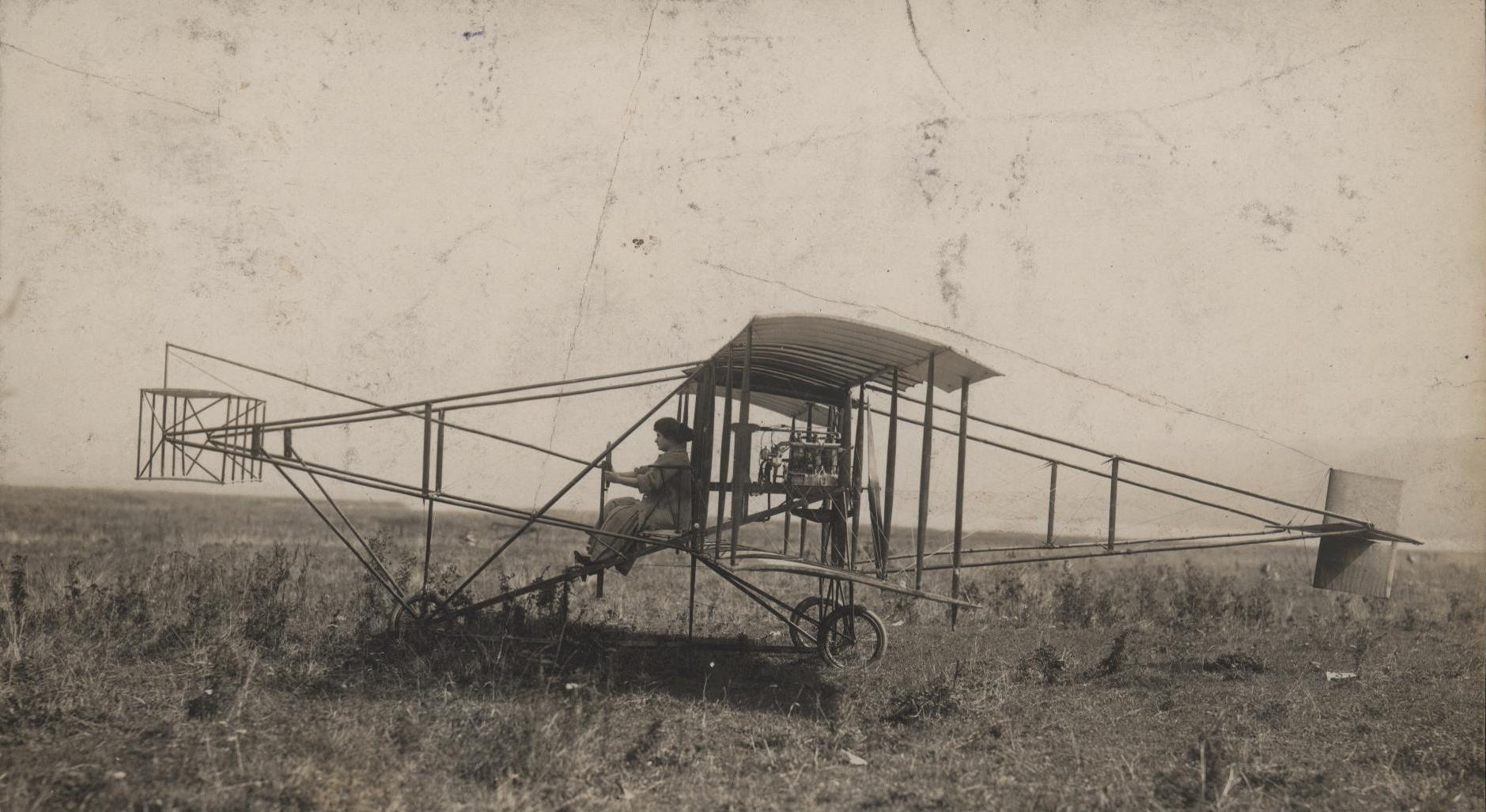
Julia Clark in Exhibition Plane, 1911 (9897521094)

Julia Clark (December 21, 1880 – June 17, 1912) was the third woman to receive a pilot's license from the Aero Club of America, and the first American woman to die while piloting an airplane. She earned her pilot's license on May 19, 1912 and died less than one month later.

== Biography ==
Clark was born in London, England on December 21, 1880. Her family emigrated to Bangor, Maine and then moved to California and subsequently to Denver where she worked as a stenographer. Her interest in flying began when she attended the 1911 Chicago International Aviation Meet. After first overcoming Glenn Curtiss' reluctance to train women pilots, she was enrolled in his flying school in San Diego where, on May 19, 1912, she earned her pilots license (#133) after soloing to 1,000 feet. She then joined the Curtiss-Wright Aviators exhibition team, being billed as "The Daring Bird-Girl" and contracted for several exhibitions in the Midwest. On June 17, 1912, in Springfield, Illinois, she decided to make a test flight around dusk. Visibility was poor and, after striking a tree limb, the plane, a Curtiss pusher, tumbled to the ground, pinning her beneath the wreckage. She died after being rushed by automobile to the hospital, having never regained consciousness. Her body was sent to her home in Denver.

Clark was the first American woman to die in an air accident, preceding Harriet Quimby's death by two weeks. She was also said to be the first licensed woman pilot to die piloting an aircraft. The previous two woman pilots who died, Denise Moore in July 1911 and Suzanne Bernard in March 1912, died prior to earning their licenses. Moore and Bernard were both attending Henri Farman's flying school, in Étampes-sur-Marne, France at the time of their deaths.
