= Augustus Post =

American adventurer

Colonel Augustus Post
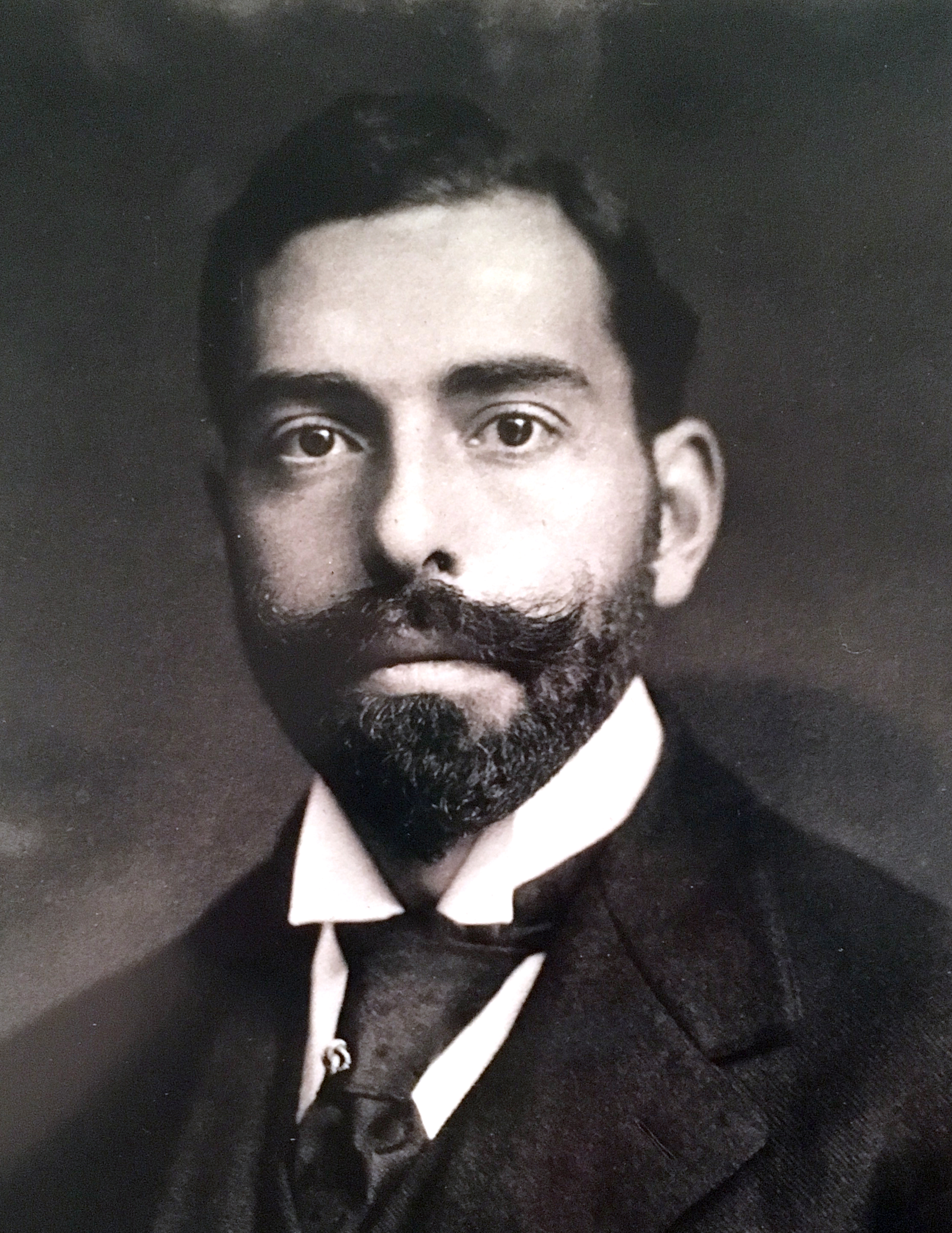
- Born: Augustus Thomas Post Jr. December 8, 1873; Brooklyn, New York, US
- Died: October 4, 1952 (aged 78); New York City, US
- Education: Amherst College; Harvard Law School
- Alma mater: Amherst College
- Occupations: Aviator, balloonist, automotive pioneer, actor, author, musician, lecturer
- Known for: Founder of the American Automobile Association; Founder of Aero Club of America; Champion Balloonist

Signature
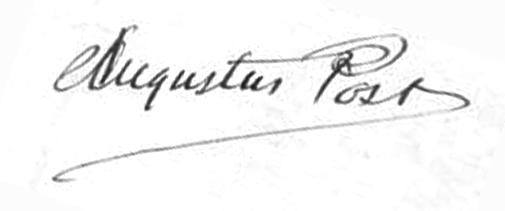

Augustus Thomas Post Jr. (December 8, 1873 – October 4, 1952) was an American adventurer who distinguished himself as an automotive pioneer, balloonist, early aviator, writer, actor, musician and lecturer. Post pursued an interest in transportation of every form. In 1898, when Post was 25, following his time at Harvard Law School, he circumnavigated the globe by rail and steamship. He then bought one of the earlier made automobiles, crafted by Charles Duryea, and helped found the Glidden Auto Tours, an automotive distance drive and competition used to promote a national highway system. He was the original founder, in 1902, of what is now the American Automobile Association (AAA), first known as the Auto Club of America. He established the nation's first parking garage, the first bus service, and also received the first driving ticket in New York.

In 1907, Post was one of the first civilians to descend in a submarine. Two years later he became the thirteenth man to fly solo in an airplane. As founder of the Aero Club of America he served as official timer for Orville Wright's historic 57-minute flight at Fort Myer, Virginia in 1908. Early that same year and in winter's cold at Hammondsport, New York, Post worked with Alexander Graham Bell's Aerial Experiment Association where he represented the Aero Club and helped test new equipment and gliders. Post then worked with fellow AEA alumn Glenn Curtiss and was present for the historic flight of the Curtiss June Bug. He also participated in the international Gordon Bennett Balloon Races from 1906 to 1910. In 1910 he set a distance and duration record in a free balloon, flying as aide to Alan R. Hawley in the balloon "America II", a North American record that stood for 95 years.

In 1919, five years after having predicted the possibility of transatlantic travel, Post inspired hotel owner Raymond Orteig to put up the $25,000 prize money for the transatlantic flight competition that was ultimately won by Charles Lindbergh in 1927. Post also made meaningful contributions to the establishment of the US air mail service, and to the creation of one of the first major academic programs in Aeronautical Engineering, which was at New York University.

Outside of his work in transportation, Post was an avid outdoorsman. He was an original member of the Society of the Sons of Daniel Boone which merged to form the Boy Scouts of America in 1910. In addition to his other pursuits, Post performed on Broadway, acted in plays, and wrote books of poetry, an opera, and original songs. In his later life Post worked as part of the National Association for Music in Hospitals, performed with the New York Symphony Chorus, and continued to support the causes and groups he had helped establish. He was a sought-after professional lecturer until his death in 1952 at age 78.

== Early life ==
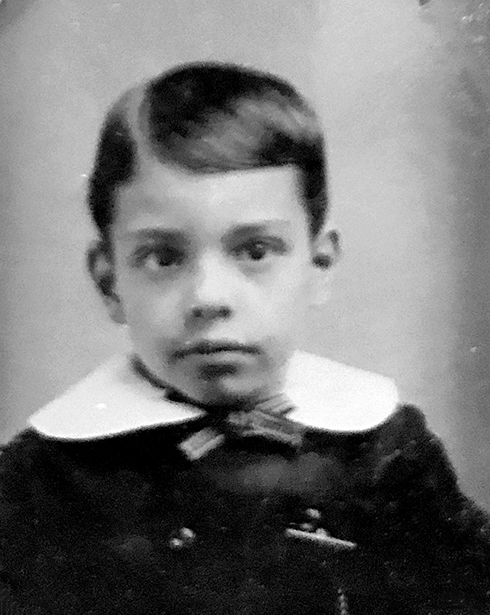
Augustus Post, age six

Post was born to Augustus T. Post Sr. (1832–1891), a banker, and Mary Elizabeth Austin (1844–1893), in Brooklyn, New York, in 1873. He had one sister, Mary Augusta Post, who was a year and a half his senior, and with whom he was close throughout his life. The two children grew up in comfort as their father amassed considerable wealth in banking, becoming the president of Produce Bank.

A year before his death, Post Sr. was associated with the case of bank forger Albert H. Smith, who was convicted of stealing more than $400,000 ($14 million in 2025 dollars) from a series of financial institutions, including Produce Bank. Post Sr. was never alleged to be complicit in the crimes, nor was his fortune considered to be associated with the case.

Both of their parents died when Post and his sister Mary were still teenagers. They inherited their father's fortune and spent their time among the social elites of New York, Boston, and Philadelphia.

Post attended Brooklyn Polytechnic, then went to Amherst College, where he competed as a speed walker in track and field. He also sang second bass in the Glee Club and was a member of the banjo club and the Alpha Delta Phi fraternity. He received a Masters of Arts in 1895 and then went to Harvard Law School from 1895 to 1896.

== Automotive achievements ==
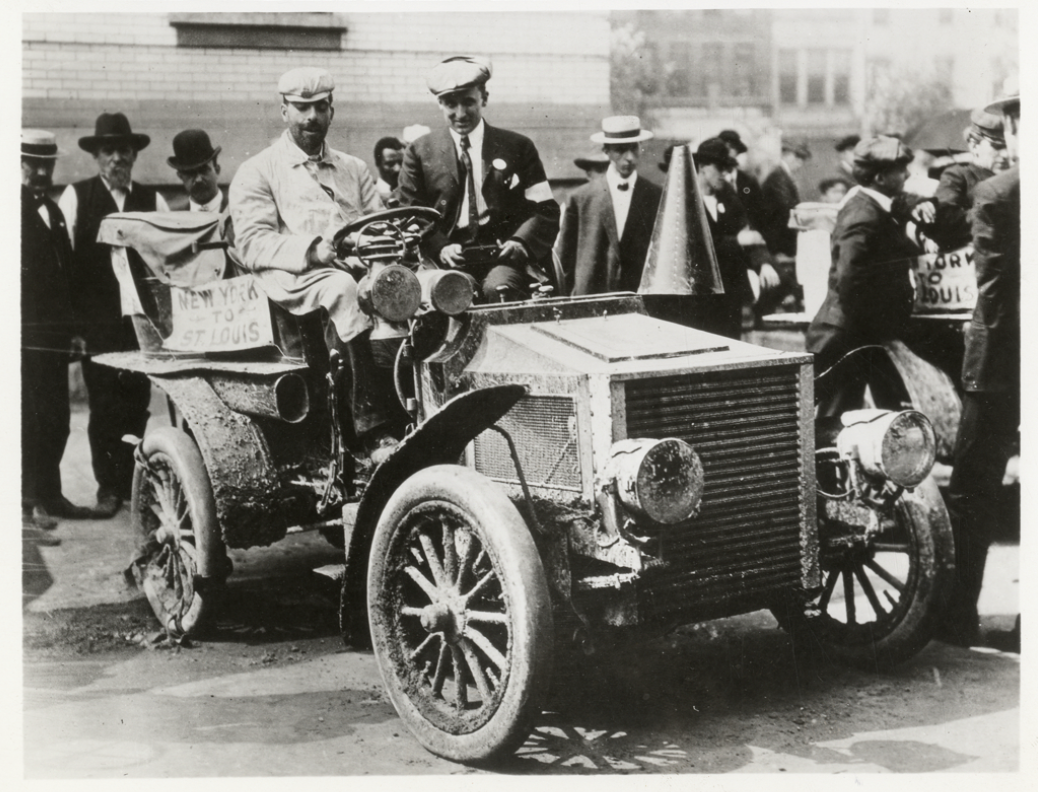
Augustus Post driving his White Steamer in 1905 Glidden Auto Tour

Post was a lifelong advocate for improved auto safety and the creation and maintenance of an extensive U.S. highway system.

=== Early adopter and early traffic tickets ===
Post purchased his first car at a motorcycle rally in 1898. It was made by a Pennsylvanian named Duryea. Two years later, Post commissioned his well-known car White Steamer from Thomas White, who founded the White Motor Company in 1900. The steamer, which was black in color, was nicknamed the "Black White". In his new vehicle, Post set out to test the byways of America and determine their suitability for auto travel.

Post established the city's first parking garage beneath the St. Nicholas skating rink, at 66th Street and Columbus Avenue. He also established the first bus service which ran between the Waldorf Hotel and the Brighton Beach Race Course, giving the horse-drawn carryalls of the day serious competition.

Post was the first in New York to receive tickets for traffic violations. By his own account, his first ticket was given while he was driving in Riverside Drive at 10 miles per hour. He was pulled over by a policeman on a bicycle. He also received the first ticket in Central Park. Parks Commissioner George C. Clausen had banned cars in the park because their noise and because the scent of naphtha irritated the horses. However, in 1900, Willis Holly, secretary of the Park Board, convinced Clausen that horses had become accustomed to steamer vehicles and a small group of drivers were given permits to drive in the park including Post. Though Post was considered an excellent driver, he received an additional ticket for running up on a sidewalk while attempting to park in front of the house of Daniel Sickles, at 23 Fifth Avenue. Post was taken to the headquarters of the Traffic Squad at East 27th Street, where he telephoned Sickles's son, Stanton Sickles, whom he had originally gone to visit, and Sickles came and bailed him out.

In 1903 Post made a drive from Pittsburgh to New York City with friend R. H. Johnston. Though he noted the roads they travelled in Pennsylvania had loose stones and demanded cautious driving, the roads were not prone to washouts like those in New York State. Post told the Pittsburgh Post: "At a very small expense the pike might be resurfaced. It would regain its original prestige and would have the distinction of being the first link in the transcontinental boulevard." Post's vision of a coast to coast highway was made real ten years later with the development of the Lincoln Highway from New York to San Francisco, which did indeed run through Pittsburgh.

=== Establishing the AAA and the Glidden Auto Tours ===
Glidden Tour, 1905

During February 1904 Post conceived of an auto cup race like ones that were already popular in Europe, where he had travelled extensively. He and several associates planned to test routes and seek sponsors for the endeavor. In March 1904 Post led fifteen other auto enthusiasts on a drive from New York to St. Louis. The event caught the attention of millionaire automotive enthusiast Charles Glidden, who furnished a cup and put up prize money for whoever finished first. The event was a success and became an annual race known as the Glidden Auto Tours. In 1902, Post who was first a member and then Vice President of the Long Island Automobile Club, then the founder of the Auto Club of America.

Post drove his White Steamer in all three of the first Glidden tours from 1904 to 1906. Because the car was custom-made, the cost of the Steamer exceeded the modern day cost of a Rolls-Royce.

== Ballooning records ==
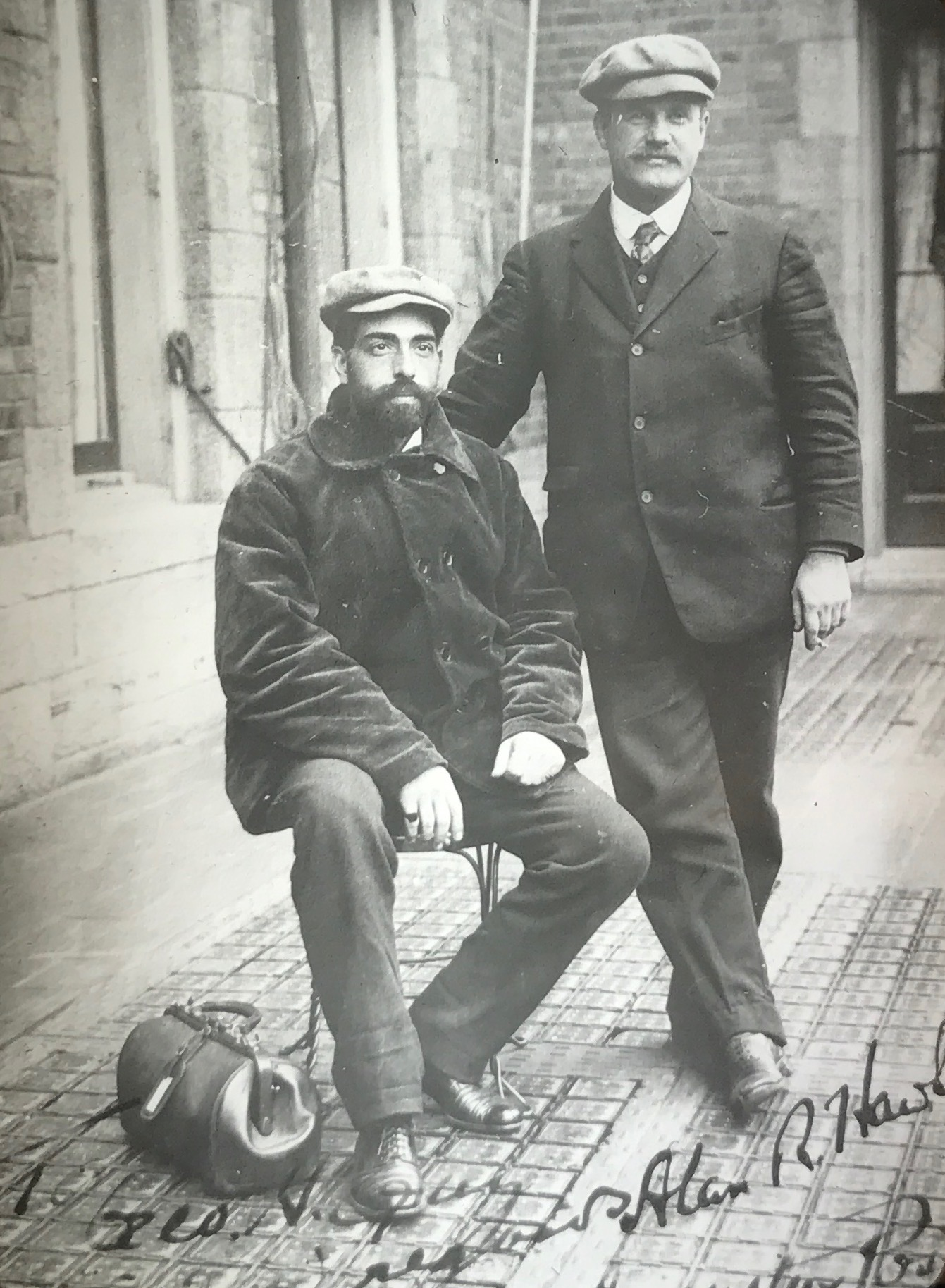
Augustus Post and Alan Hawley returning to New York following their record setting balloon flight in 1910.

Post participated in balloon races, including the Gordon Bennett races of 1906, 1908, 1909, 1910, and 1911. He survived a number of aeronautic disasters, including the rupture of the balloon "Conqueror" in which he was flying with A. Holland Forbes in the Gordon Bennett Race in Berlin in 1908. The balloon fell 4,775 feet and crashed through the roof of a house, but the men were unharmed.

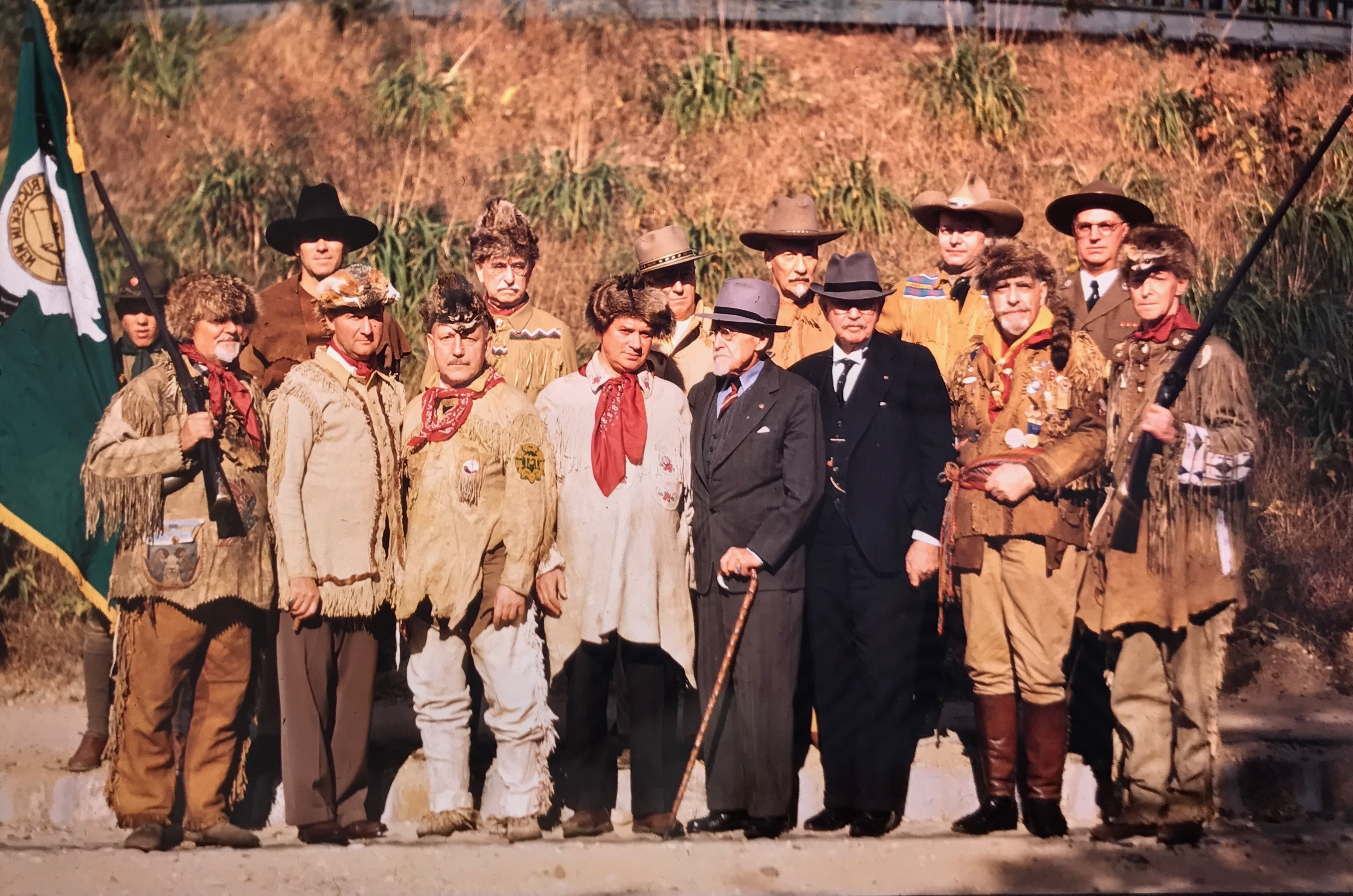
Augustus Post was an original member of the Boy Scouts of America's national council and the Sons of Daniel Boone Society before it. Pictured here second from right in front row.

Post's best known ballooning achievement was when he served as aide to Alan Hawley in the 1910 Gordon Bennett race flying the balloon "America II". The race's ten balloons set off from St. Louis, Missouri; two days later, Post and Hawley landed in a remote, uninhabited area of Quebec near Lake St. John. They trekked through the Canadian wilderness, slowed by Hawley, who had injured a knee just after landing. Post, who had been moose hunting in Canada with Ezra Fitch (of Abercrombie & Fitch Co.) in 1905, had some knowledge of the terrain. Also, though he had grown up in Brooklyn, Post had spent summers with his family at the Mohonk Mountain House near the Catskill Mountains of New York, where he had hiked and developed skills as a woodsman. While the balloonists were lost in Canada, Post created lean-tos to keep them dry when snow and rain fell, and he caught fish, using improvised lures, to supplement their food stores.

Word of Hawley and Post's disappearance ran on the front pages of newspapers across the nation. As the days stretched into a week and the men still had not been heard from, search parties were formed. After ten days in the wilderness, Hawley and Post found a trapper's tent and then ran into two locals, Joseph Pedneaude and Joseph Simard, out on a hunting trip. The men took the balloonists back to the closest town, Chicoutimi, from which they were able to send telegrams to family and friends. They then made their way to a train terminus and then home.

At Grand Central Station in New York, Hawley and Post were met with a hero's welcome and informed they had set a distance and duration record of 1,173 miles in 44 hours and 25 minutes for travel in a free balloon, a North American Gordon Bennett record that stood for 95 years. Post's role in the adventure, particularly his survival skills, caught the attention of Daniel Carter Beard, who had founded the Society of the Sons of Daniel Boone for boys in 1905. The Society emphasized outdoorsmanship, self-sufficiency, and pioneering spirit. Post became a governing member of the Society, which was merged into the Boy Scouts of America later that same year in 1910 with Post continuing his interest.

== Early aviator ==
=== Thirteenth man to fly ===
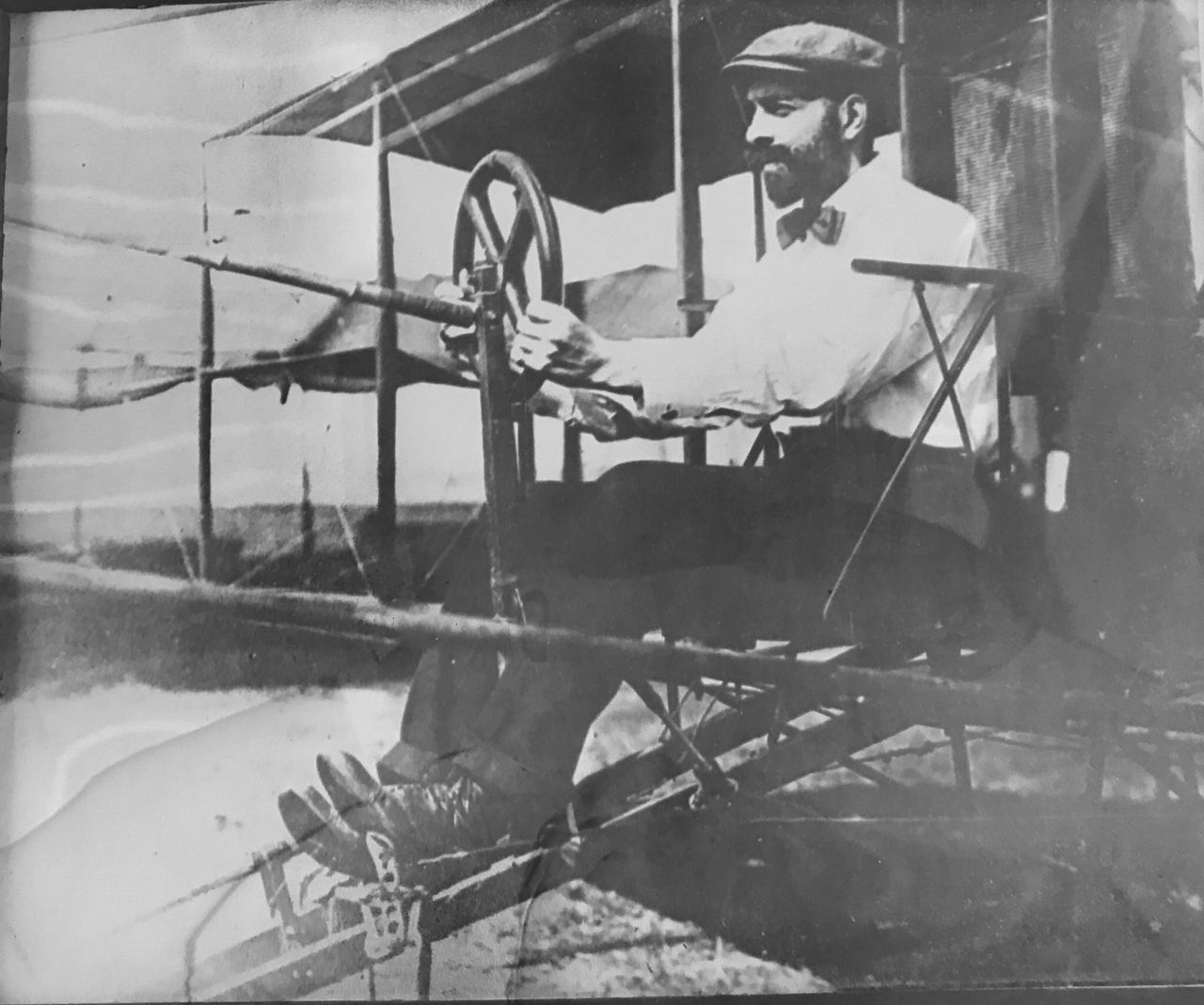
Augustus Post flying one of the first Curtis biplanes in 1910.

While Post continued ballooning, he was also drawn to the emerging innovation of heavier-than-air flight. He wrecked several planes before successfully taking to the air, and press outlets suggested his signature Van Dyke beard—which was somewhat uncommon at the time— might be to blame for his difficulties. In 1908, Post became thirteenth man to fly. He was an original founder of the Aero Club of America and served as its first secretary. As such he served as official timer for Orville Wright's record-setting 57 minute flight at Ft. Myer, Virginia, on September 9, 1908.

=== Aerial Experiment Association ===
Also in 1908, Post worked with and supported Alexander Graham Bell's Aerial Experiment Association (AEA), a group of Canadian and American engineers who worked together for two years and developed the tricycle landing gear and wingtip ailerons, among other innovations. After the AEA disbanded, Post worked with fellow AEA alum Glenn Curtiss on the design and testing of Curtiss' aircraft. Post wrote a biographical essay about Curtiss entitled "The Evolution of a Flying Man", which ran in The Century in 1910. The two collaborated on the Curtiss Aviation Book, published the following year, which marked the start of Post's writing career.

== Promoter of aviation expansion ==
Over a 42-year period, from 1910, when he first became an author, to his death in 1952, Post wrote numerous newspaper articles and essays in which he described not only his own experiences as an aviator but also the potential of aviation to change society.

His work appeared in a broad range of magazines, including The American, Science and Invention, Aerial Age, and Outing. For the scouting magazine Boys' Life, Post wrote articles encouraging boys to take up aviation, which he presented as a field that would soon provide jobs beyond just performing at aerial expositions.

He encouraged participation in the field of aviation for all, including women and minorities, and as secretary of the Aero Club of America he signed the first woman's pilot license issued after World War I, that of Laura Bromwell. It is on permanent display at the National Air and Space Museum in Washington, D.C.

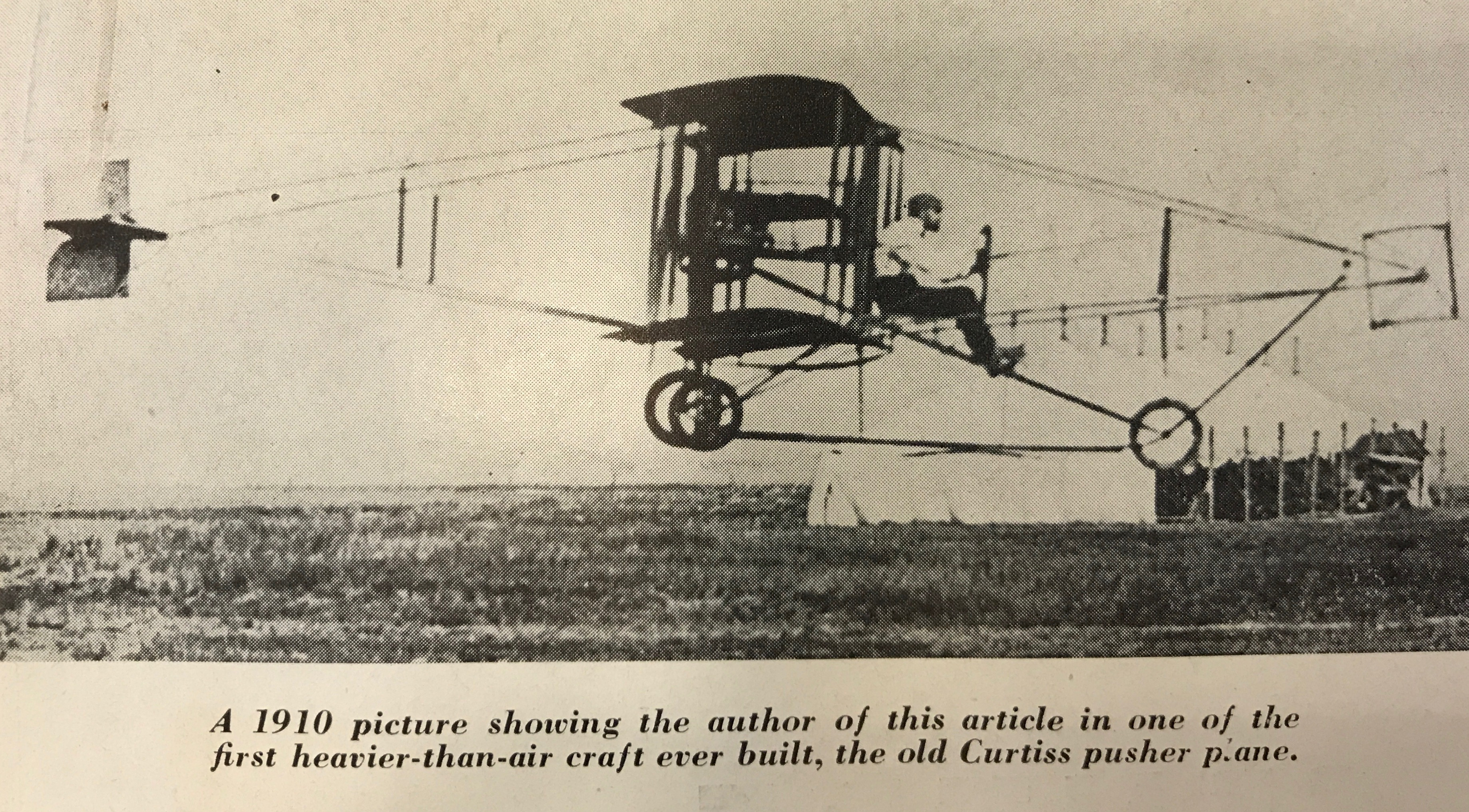
Augustus Post flying Curtiss pusher plane circa 1910. Post worked closely with Curtiss and flight tested many aircraft.

=== Establishment of air mail ===
Post saw potential for aviation as a public good. In particular he advocated for the creation of an air mail service, the establishment of specific air routes, and the creation of airports, a term he coined. He designed the first air mail route, which went from Washington, D.C., to New York with a stop in Philadelphia, which was first flown on May 15, 1918.

=== Promotion of Aeronautical Engineering field of study ===
In 1912, nine years after the Wright brothers' first historic flight, Post wrote a piece in which he described the immediate problems in aviation, saying, "The first year of the aeroplane's appearance before the public was marked by one death. In 1909 there were three. In the following year, 1910, there were 29; and in 1911, eighty-three." Post, who had survived several plane wrecks, focussed not only on how to make planes go farther and faster, but how to do so more safely. He wrote: "In the first place, we must establish more and better equipped laboratories…for the study of wind and weather…Along with this must go the making of better air maps and charts…The aviator needs these guides no less than the mariner needs his charts."

Post would realize his goal for the creation of better equipped laboratories for study in aeronautics some 15 years later when he helped advance the establishment of a program in Aeronautical Engineering and Industrial Aviation at New York University. He was nominated to serve as a member of the Faculty Aviation Committee alongside the heads of the Physics, Mechanical, and Industrial Engineering departments, as well as then-associate professor of Aeronautical Engineering Alexander Klemin with whom Post had worked several years earlier during the effort to establish the airmail service. Klemin had served as a consulting engineer on that project.

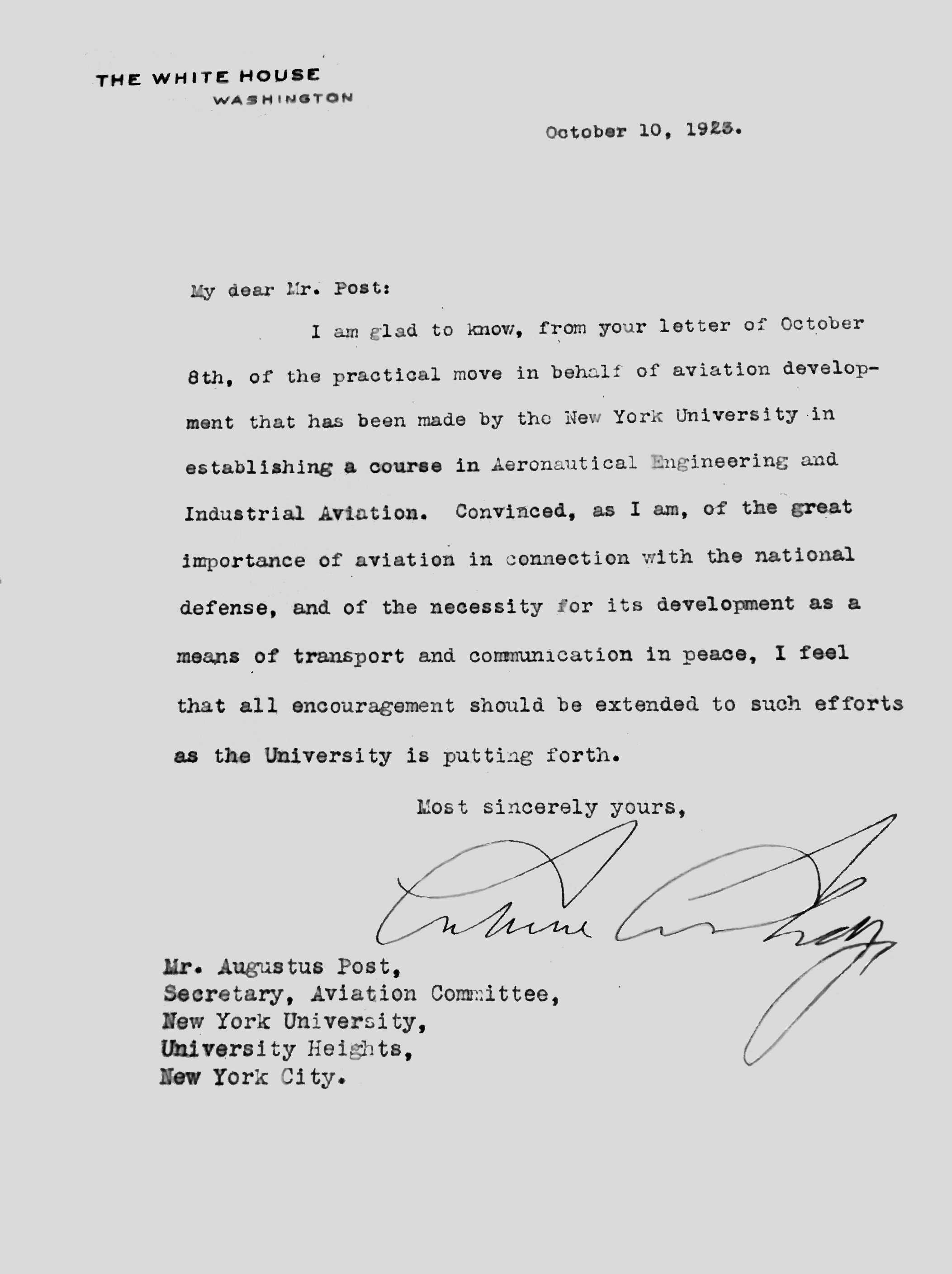
1923 - Letter to Augustus Post from Calvin Coolidge Regarding NYU Aeronautical Engineering Program

Post called on his network of friends and associates to provide financial and verbal endorsements for the program. He explained that "The new courses at New York University cover specifically the study of aerodynamics, the science of air flow and forces, the theory and practice of aeroplane design..and the study of aircraft engines." One person he reached out to was his former Amherst College classmate and fraternity brother Calvin Coolidge, who had just been elevated to the office of President of the United States.

Coolidge responded immediately saying, "Convinced, as I am, of the great importance of aviation in connection with the national defense, and of the necessity for its development as a means of transport and communication in peace, I feel that all encouragement should be extended to such efforts as the University is putting forth."

The experimental program was a success, and in 1925, two years after its inception, Daniel Guggenheim announced a gift of $500,000 that would fund a new building that included a propeller laboratory, other labs, and a wind tunnel. It also provided the means to hire lab assistants. The committee on which Post had served handed off its work to a new oversight committee for which Orville Wright was appointed chair. Ground was broken for the NYU Guggenheim School of Aeronautics on October 23, 1925, and it officially opened a year later. The program has been revamped over the years and had several name changes. It is now the Mechanical and Aerospace Engineering program at the New York University Tandon School of Engineering.

=== Special military service in aviation ===
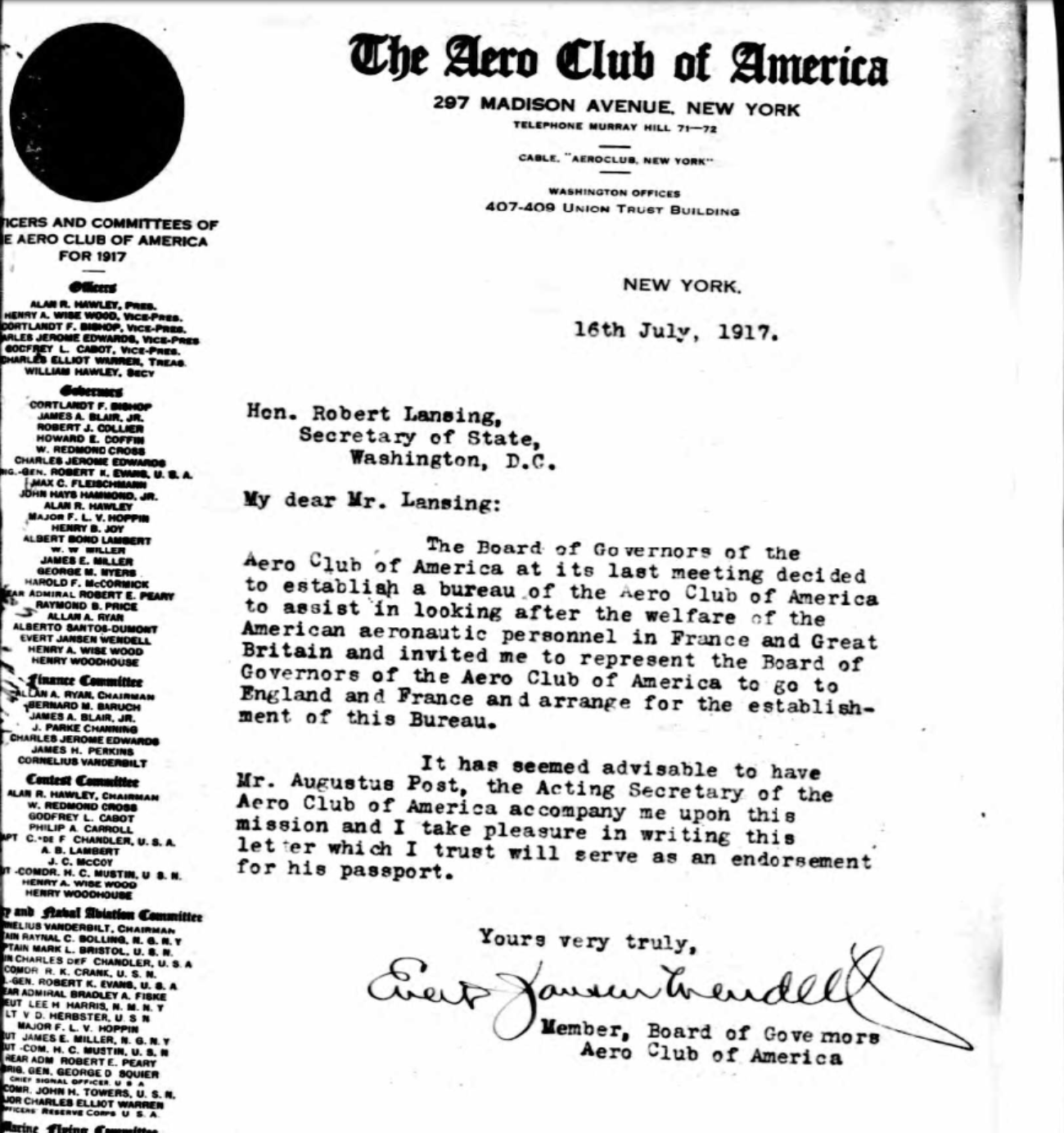
The president and several members of the Aero Club of America wrote to Secretary of State Lansing to recommend sending Augustus Post to Britain and France to help train military aviators in World War I.

Anticipating U.S. entry into World War I, Post wrote an essay in 1915 entitled "The Aeroplane in War and its Future in Peace," in which he tracked the progress, in less than one hundred years, from the use of balloons for reconnaissance in the U.S. Civil War to the emergence of heavier-than-air craft in the war then spreading across Europe. He began, "Battle lines, once horizontal, are now vertical." Months after the essay was published, Theodore Roosevelt wrote to the Aero Club of America endorsing their work, and the leaders of the ACA wrote to Secretary of State Robert Lansing advising that Post be sent to Britain and France to help train military airmen. Post was an expert on Curtiss planes, which became the workhorses of the Aviation Section of the U.S. Army Signal Corps in World War I. Lansing approved the assignment.

Post's fluency in French and German made it possible for him to gather information and send home detailed reports and observations on the relative strengths and weaknesses of allied and enemy aircraft. He noted that the French were struggling to catch up to the Germans with their "flying tank" and he commended American aviators for honing their "group flying", using a V formation to encircle enemy craft and gain a strategic advantage. He also noted the usefulness of blimps employed by the French along their coast to spot submarines to a depth of 65 feet.

Later in life Post was often referred to as "Major Post" or "Colonel Post". These titles were not associated with his special military service; they were honorary designations conferred by the New York Police Department for his work in helping establish an NYPD aerial unit.

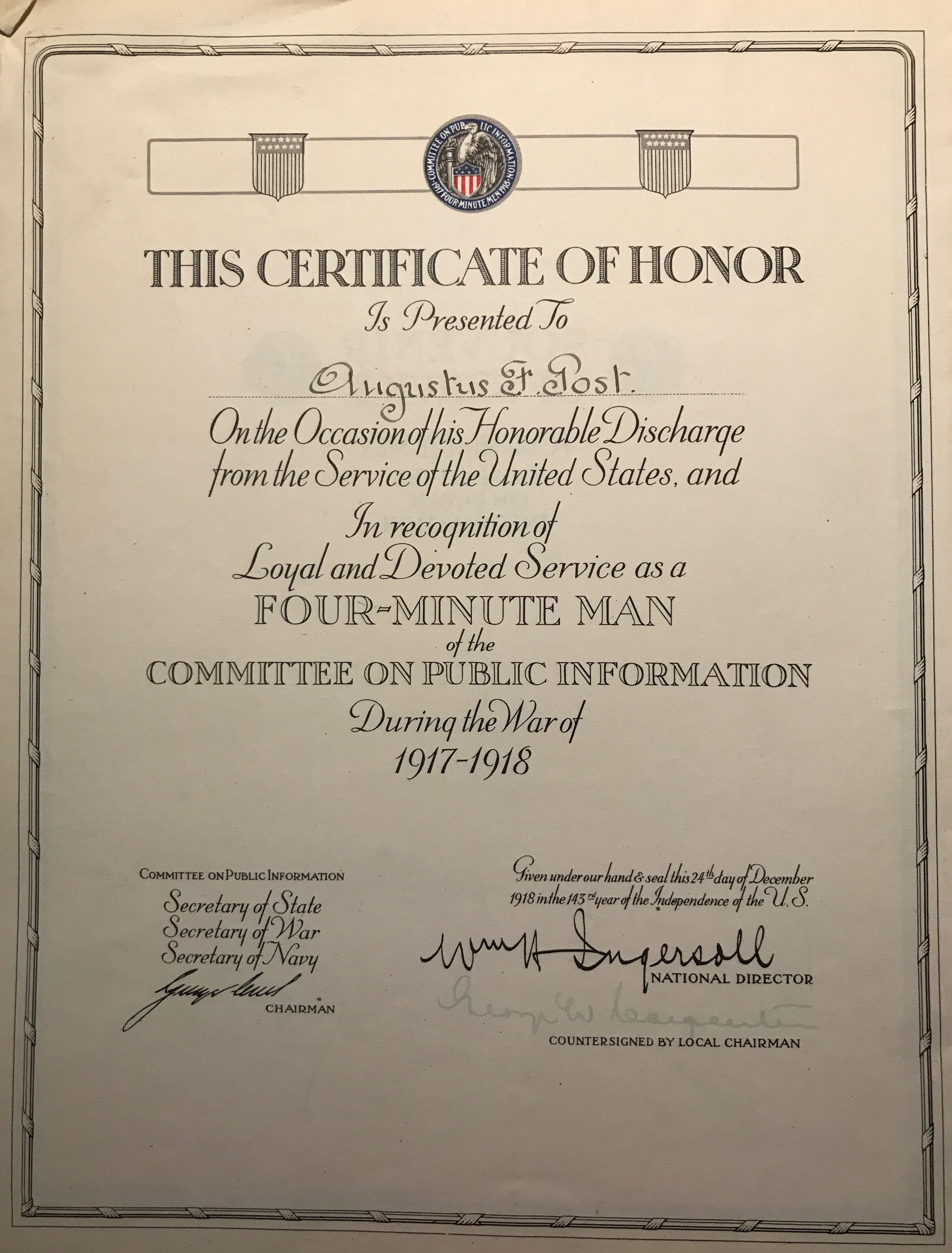
Certificate of Honor to Augustus Post for his service in WWI to the Four Minute Men of the Committee for Public Information. Signed by the national director and endorsed by the Secretary of State, the Secretary of the Navy, and the Secretary of War. Conferred on December 24, 1918.

In addition to his service in Britain and France, Post was also a member of the Four Minute Men, a group of volunteers who worked for The Committee on Public Information, an independent government agency dedicated to promoting national awareness of and support for military actions. The volunteers gave four minute lectures at public venues, from town hall meetings to movie theaters to restaurants. Post's contributions as a Four Minute Man, specifically educating the public on the capabilities of aircraft for war and peace, earned him a certificate of honor for his service. It was conferred by the CPI's national director, William H. Ingersoll, with the endorsement of the Secretary of State, the Secretary of War and the Secretary of the Navy.

During World War II Post returned to his wartime efforts to encourage youth to join the military air service. For example, he spoke to and encouraged Jewish aviators training at the Jabotinsky Aviation School in Rockaway, New York in 1941.

=== Visionary for transportation beyond aviation ===
In his later years, Post continued to make accurate and prescient predictions about the future of travel. He anticipated and described the development of special fuels that would increase airplane speed, what we now know as jet fuel. Three years before his death—twenty years before the Moon landing—Post foresaw the ability of rockets to propel humans beyond Earth's atmosphere. He also envisioned an "Interplanetary Society", his description of which mirrors our modern day National Air and Space Administration (N.A.S.A.).

Although Post presaged many aeronautic innovations, not all of his expectations for the future panned out. One example was his idea for dirigible roof gardens. He told The New York Times in 1919 that one day there would be 1,000-foot-long dirigibles that could be fitted for pleasure cruises and have roof gardens and balconies. Dirigible roof gardens did not catch on. The crash of the Hindenburg in Lakehurst, New Jersey, in 1937, and, to a lesser extent, the Roma before it in 1922, effectively ended the market for public travel in dirigibles.

== Lindbergh flight ==
Post repeatedly and accurately predicted the future of modern aeronautics. In 1914 he predicted the possibility of intercontinental air travel in an essay entitled "Columbus of the Air". In it he wrote: "A man is now living who will be the first human being to cross the Atlantic Ocean through the air. He will cross while he is still a young man. All at once, Europe will move two days nearer; instead of five days away." Post's efforts to engineer a transatlantic flight were interrupted by World War I.

After the war, Post continued to promote aviation. He organized events and exhibitions, worked at aviation schools, and persistently advocated for the creation of air mail service, which occurred in 1918. That same year he worked with the Aero Club of America to plan a flight over the North Pole, enlisting the help of Captain Robert Bartlett, who had accompanied Admiral Robert Peary on the dash to the pole in 1909. Though Bartlett was interested and detailed plans were drawn up, the flight was ultimately abandoned.

After the failure of the arctic flight plan, Post resumed focus on promoting the transatlantic flight he had envisioned in 1914. He proposed his idea for a Paris to New York City flight to New York hotel owner Raymond Orteig. Post encouraged Ortieg to put up $25,000 in prize money for whoever could accomplish the feat, then drafted the rules for the competition. Post and Ortieg were criticized in the press for sending men to their deaths, but in 1927 Charles Lindbergh made the crossing.

== Falls, crashes and injuries ==
At the beginning of the twentieth century, cars, balloons, and airplanes, lacking safety features, were extraordinarily dangerous. Post used all three, but survived a number of equipment failures and other exigencies. Though Post's many crashes are well documented, his manifest expertise as an aviator and balloonist were noted by colleagues throughout his lifetime. In his 1913 testimony before the U.S. Second Circuit Court of Appeals in the protracted patent lawsuit between the Wright Brothers and Glenn Curtiss, Post described having conducted more than 25 successful test flights of Curtiss planes within just a few weeks in Hammondsport, New York, in 1910. He was a reliable and sought-after aviation instructor in general and was employed by the U.S. military during both world wars.

=== Near miss in 1905 Glidden Tour ===
In the Glidden Auto Tour of 1905, Post narrowly avoided being hit by a train while navigating his White Steamer through Stony Brook, Massachusetts. A railroad crossing gate had not been lowered. Seeing the gate up, Post drove toward the tracks as the New York to New Haven train approached. Applying both brakes, Post was able to stop the car as the train went past directly in front of him.

=== Fall of "Le Centaur" ===
In 1906, Post set off from Pittsfield, Massachusetts, in a balloon called "Le Centaur", with Alan Hawley and French aeronaut Count Henry de la Vaulx. Twenty-five minutes into the trip, the balloon, having risen to more than 5,000 feet, hit turbulence. The balloon dropped 3,000 feet in fewer than three minutes, then rose up and dropped again. The men cut ballast in an effort to slow the balloon's descent and attempted to land in a farmer's field in North Colebrook, Connecticut, but the basket was dragged a considerable distance by the wind before holding fast. The three men emerged unscathed.

=== Fall of "Conqueror" ===
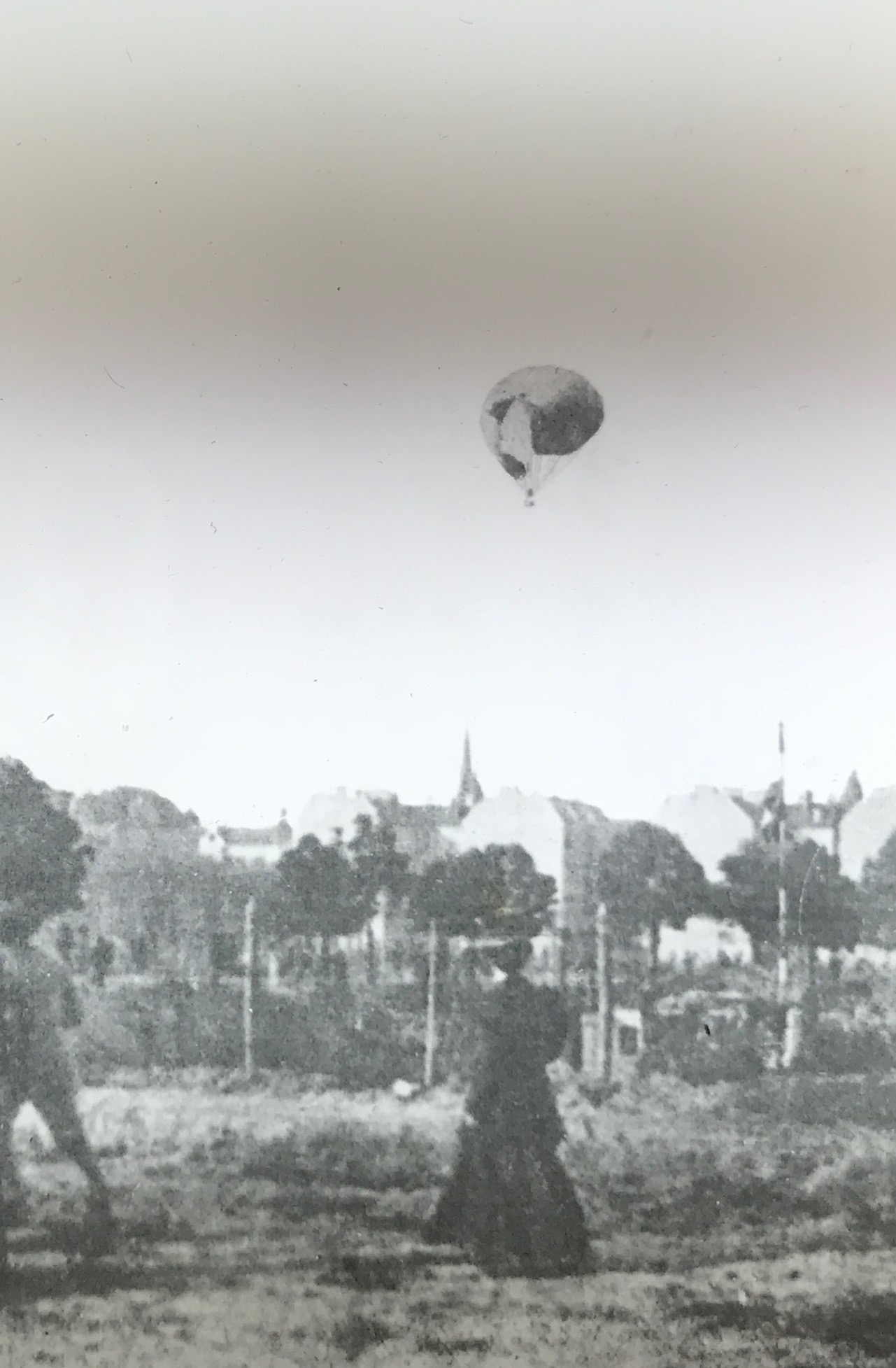
The balloon Conqueror, flown by A. Holland Forbes and Augustus Post in the 1908 Gordon Bennett balloon race in Berlin, tearing open at more than 4,000 feet.

Thousands attended the start of the 1908 Gordon Bennett Balloon Race in Germany in which Post flew in a balloon called "Conqueror" as aide to A. Holland Forbes, president of the Forbes Publishing Company. "Conqueror" was the largest size balloon then used in competition. It had a gas capacity of 80,000 cubic feet, and stood 80 feet high with a fifty-foot diameter. Prior to the race Forbes had lengthened the balloon's appendix in an effort to allow less gas to escape from the balloon's envelope and thereby improve the chances for prolonged flight.

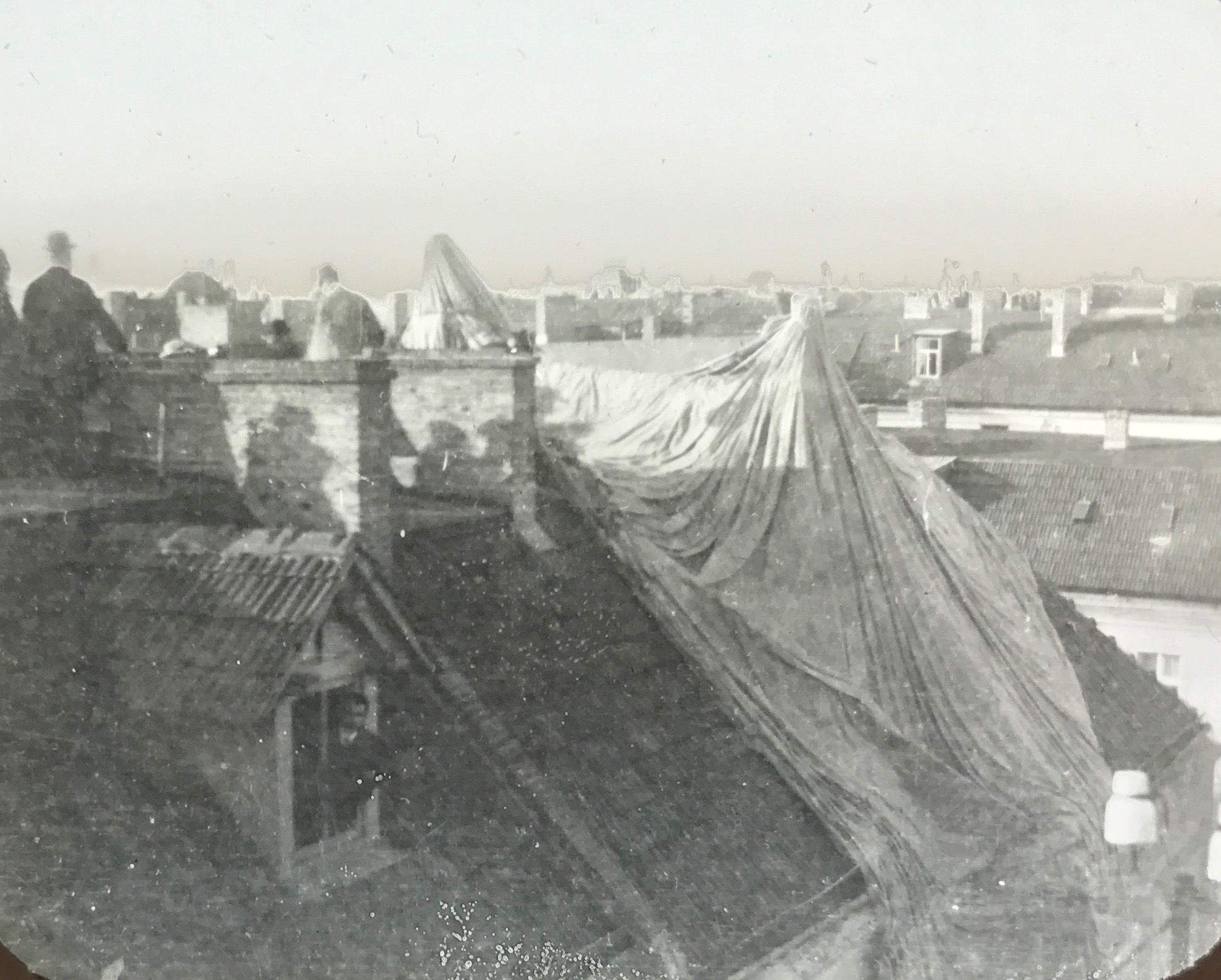
The Conqueror, balloon flown by A. Holland Forbes and Augustus post in the 1908 Gordon Bennett balloon race, draped over rooftop in Berlin after falling from more than 4,000 feet.

At the start of the race a gust of wind caught "Conqueror" and propelled it toward a wooden fence where spectators were packed. The crowd parted but the balloon struck the fence and the impact knocked off two ballast bags and split two more, causing the balloon to ascend rapidly and the basket to swing uncontrollably.

The fabric of the balloon then tore and the basket plummeted from a height of approximately 4,780 feet, based on the aneroid barograph record that was signed by the race officials. Forbes cut ballast bags to slow their descent, and the balloon's fabric folded in on itself against the balloon's netting, slowing it slightly. The men took hold of the support ring above them and lifted their feet as the basket smashed halfway through the tiled roof of a house in the Berlin suburb of Friedenau. Forbes and Post sustained only bruises. News of their survival spread and the German Emperor Wilhelm II invited them to be his personal guests that night at the Royal Opera.

=== Troubled flight at Sheepshead Bay ===
In the early days of aviation, formal instruction did not exist, so trial and error were the basis of flight training. Post began flying in 1909; by 1910 he was flying in exhibitions, including the Jamestown Exposition and the Harvard-Boston Aero Meet. On August 10, 1910, at an exposition at Sheepshead Bay racetrack, Post lost control of the Curtiss plane he was flying.

Forced to steer with one hand, Post hit the fence at the end of the field during takeoff, then on his first loop of the track he hit a small hill, before ascending once more. A reporter for the Detroit Free Press described the ride as "buck jumping", adding "Apparently the machine had got clean away from him, and was just ramming around on a spree." The same reporter described what happened next: "Around flew Post, whisking over the stable roofs and heading for the racetrack infield. His plane pitched up and down, rocking in the heavy air. Side gusts hit it, and whirligigs that had bothered the veterans all afternoon spun it like a top, but Post plunged safely through all these dangers, dove down like a fish hawk and lit with a spinning propeller in the center of the field." On exiting the craft safely, Post responded to reporters' questions saying: "I'm sorry about this. I assure you, gentlemen, that I did not mean to make that kind of a flight."

=== Crash in New Orleans ===
On December 3, 1910, four months after the Sheepshead Bay incident and two months after being lost in the woods of Canada for ten days with Alan Hawley in the Gordon Bennett Balloon Race, Post crashed a plane at an exhibition in New Orleans. While he was banking to make a low turn, the tail of his Curtiss biplane hit a tree, causing the plane to fall 60 feet and smash into the ground. Post knocked a tooth loose, and was badly bruised. This was one of the few occasions when Post was taken to the hospital.

=== Balloon sucked into cyclone in Kansas City ===
Post and Clifford B. Harmon were flying a self-built balloon called "New York" in the National Balloon Races starting Kansas City in 1911 when they were sucked into a cyclone. The men had brought on board equipment, including a sphygmomanometer and cardiograph, to study the effect of high altitude and atmospheric pressure on the human body, having previously attained the altitude of 26,000 feet. Their findings were intended to be sent to the Rockefeller Institute, but they were unable to gather data as the weather system came up suddenly at approximately 3 o'clock in the morning when they were traveling at a height of 8,000 feet. The sky was dark with the exception of lightning and they were unable to see the oncoming cyclone. Their altimeter, which survived the event and continued to make readings, later indicated they had made rapid ascents and descents of more than 5,000 feet at a time. Forced to hold on to leather straps at the bottom of the balloon's basket, they were unable to release ballast or attempt a landing. As wind speeds slowed, Post was able to pull a rip cord that opened the gas bag and extricated the balloon from the twister. The ballast bags had all been emptied or torn off the exterior of the car. The balloon dragged at low altitude for over a mile, taking out a telegraph pole before lodging in mud in a farmer's field in Fremont, Kansas. Both the men and the balloon survived unharmed.

Post's last flight in a balloon was in 1949, at age 76. He had no reported mishaps in the 31 years between the Kansas City cyclone and his final aerial ascent.

== Music, arts and theater career ==
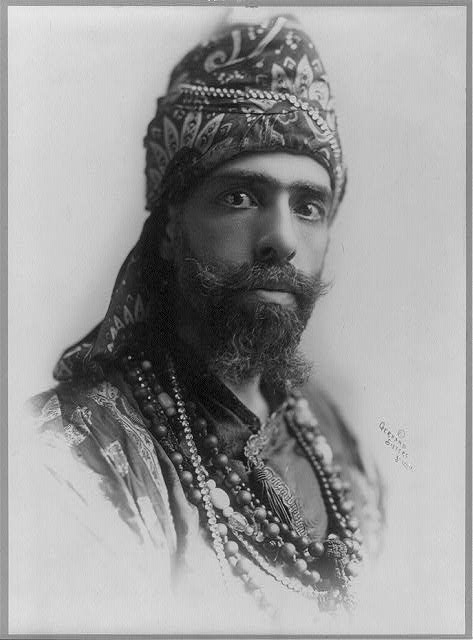
Augustus Post from original Broadway Production of Omar the Tentmaker

Post was an actor as well as aviator. In 1914—the same year he was writing about the possibility of transatlantic flight—he also appeared on Broadway in 103 performances of the original production of Omar the Tentmaker by Richard Walton Tully.

A year later he co-authored the book Poems of California with Francis Borton, and an opera, Nitana, with Umberto Nesci. While writing articles like "Up in the Air" for American Magazine and "Kite Balloons: The Eyes of the Artillery", which he translated from French to English, he was also building his reputation as a baritone with the New York Symphony Chorus and the Municipal Opera Association.

Among his other music and arts endeavors, in 1919 Post published a song called "The Day of Glory Comes", to celebrate the end of World War I. In 1928, Post starred in an American Opera Association production of The Man from Paris. He also published a book, Skycraft, in 1930.

== Lectures and civic interests ==
In his midlife, Post shifted his primary focus to the arts and civic pursuits. In 1935 he moved into a studio apartment in an enclave of artists and intellectuals in New York. During that time Post worked as a professional lecturer and continued to write and sing. He performed at society functions and gave lectures to a variety of groups including The Explorers' Club, the Harlem Prison, The Research Institute for Extra Sensory Perception, and The National Women's Press Association.

As he aged, Post regularly turned out to support the varied organizations he had helped form. He wore his Daniel Boone costume and joined Daniel Carter Beard and other Boy Scouts of America founders on annual trips to pay respects at the grave of Teddy Roosevelt on Long Island. He served as a referee at Gordon Bennett balloon races. He participated in Glidden Tour revivals, dedicated airports, and sang to sick people in hospitals until two weeks before his death.

== Personal life ==
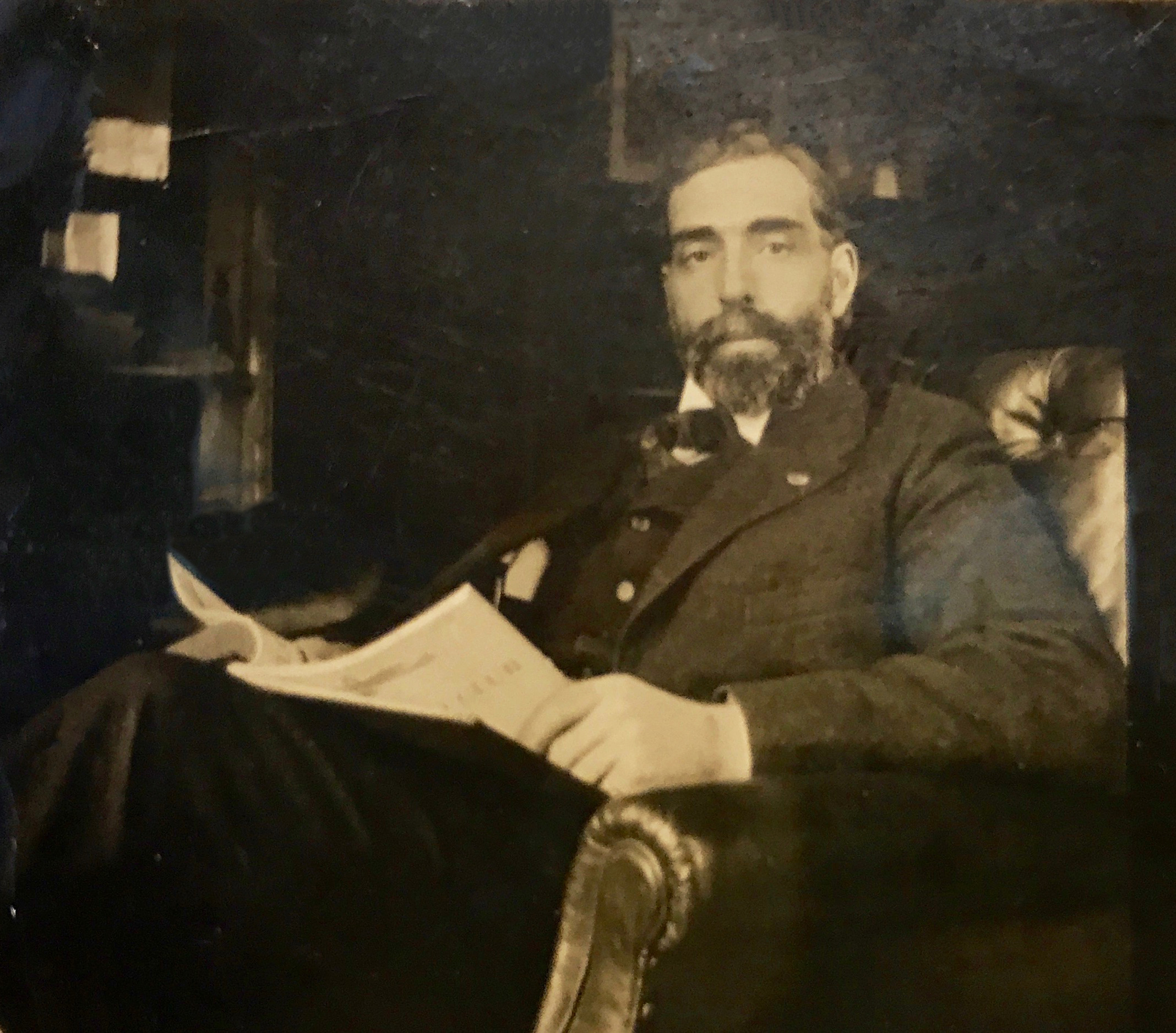
Augustus Post at home 1920

On December 8, 1898, Post's twenty-fifth birthday, he married Emma Holliday (née Thacker), a woman originally from New Orleans, who was 20 years his senior. Holliday had been married twice before. Her first husband, John Keaghy, a prominent judge in Texas, with whom she had three children, sued her for divorce citing abandonment after she left him for over a year. The divorce was granted when she did not appear in court to respond to the charges. Her second marriage was to Daniel Holliday, the nephew of the then-Governor of Virginia. Holliday sought a split after two years of marriage. He argued to the court that his wife had not received the summons to the divorce proceedings with her first husband and had therefore entered into marriage with him while still under the impression she was married to Keaghy. It was on these grounds that Holliday's annulment was granted. The annulment was finalized on December 1, 1898, one week before she married Post.

Post had met his wife while traveling in London. She was returning from Spain and he from Russia. The two lived at the Waldorf-Astoria Hotel in New York. In her testimony before the court, Emma Post indicated their first few years together were peaceful. However, in 1907 she had her husband arrested. Soon thereafter she sued for divorce on grounds of cruelty and told the press she intended to file a suit against Post's sister, Mary, as well. She alleged Mary had alienated her husband's affections by demanding his attention following her own high-profile divorce from millionaire Philadelphian Herbert Mason Clapp, grandson of James S. Mason, the founder of Mason & Co. boot blacking. Augustus Post countersued his wife seeking an annulment on the same grounds as her second husband, arguing Emma's divorce from her first husband had not been legitimate and thus she had never been in a position to remarry. The court denied his petition and granted Emma Post alimony of $250 per month, the modern day equivalent of roughly $6,800. She did not file suit against his sister.

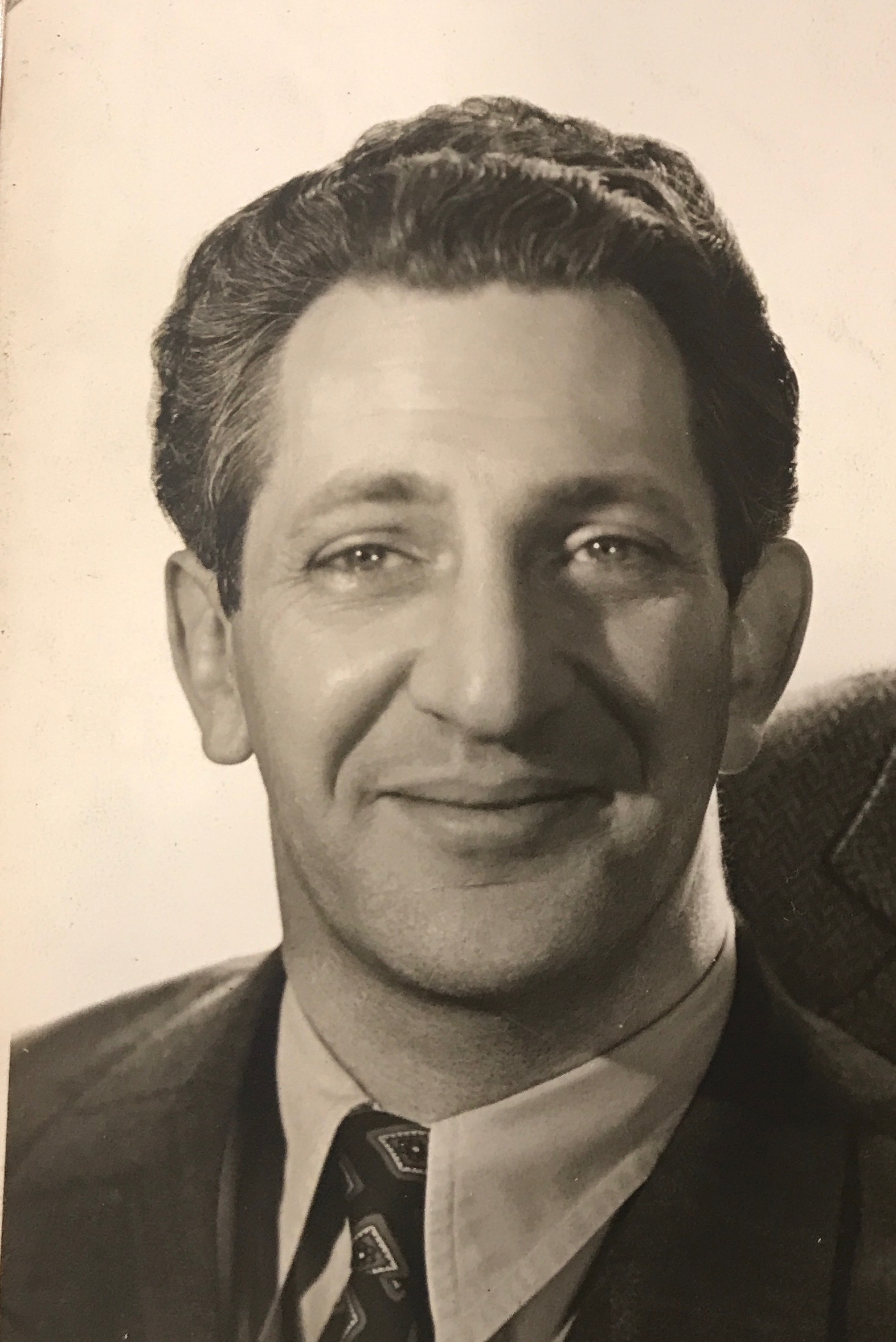
Frederic Allen Williams

The case of Post v. Post returned to the headlines periodically over a four-year period between 1907 and 1911. Augustus Post petitioned the court to have his alimony reduced, indicating that he was ill and had lost his fortune in the stock market panic of 1907. His primary employer, E. D. Shepherd Banking, went into bankruptcy that year, but Post continued his work in Alexander Graham Bell's Aerial Experiment Association and then worked with Glenn Curtiss building and testing aircraft. By 1912 Emma and Augustus Post had formally separated and Emma Post had moved to Virginia.

In 1935, Post moved in with the well-known sculptor and photographer Frederic Allen Williams. Post and Williams hosted parties at their apartment, travelled together, and participated in one another's creative endeavors. It is not clear that the partnership was a sexual one, but it was Post's closest and longest-lasting relationship. The pair remained together until Post's death.

== Death ==
Post died of a heart attack on October 5, 1952, and was buried in Green-Wood Cemetery in Brooklyn, New York.

== Awards and honors ==
- Certificate of honor conferred by the Secretary of War, Secretary of Navy and Secretary of Army for his service to the Four Minute Men during WWI
- Honored by Amherst Alumni Association in 1930
- Celebrated at AAA's 50th Anniversary Celebration two weeks before his death in 1952

Post established the A. Leo Stevens Parachute Medal in 1948. Stevens was a balloonist and balloon and parachute maker. He likely made the America II, the balloon in which Alan Hawley and Post made their record-setting flight in 1910. The award was given annually from 1948 to 1959, during which time twelve men received the award.

The Col. Augustus Post Memorial Award was given only once, to Dr. Jay Rice Moody, in 1954, by the AAA in recognition for his role in reestablishing the Glidden Auto Tours and maintaining the spirit of the original tours as founded by Post.

== In popular culture ==
=== Film and television ===
- Post is the subject of the short documentary film The Unforgettable Augustus Post, sponsored by A3 Productions, the media content branch of the American Automobile Association. The film won several awards. It received the Award of Excellence in the short documentary film category of the IndieFest film competition in 2019. It received the Best of Show award for summer 2019 in the Best Shorts Competition. At the 2019 International Motor Film Awards, the film won Best Editing in the Technical Achievement category. It won Best Documentary at the Chelsea Film Festival 2019. At the Orlando Film Festival in 2019 it won Best Short Documentary.

=== Trading cards ===
- Post was one of the pilots featured in the 1911 (T38) trading cards collection series "The Aviators" that was distributed by American Tobacco Company. Two editions of the cards were printed, a white stock version advertising Tokio and Mezzin Cigarettes, and a gold stock edition for United Cigar Stores Co. Notably, the card series featured numerous misprints and errors including ones that affected Post. While most of the prints were accurate, some cards featuring Post's likeness on the front bore the description of French aviator Jacques de Lesseps on the back. Other cards featured the image of another French aviator, Alfred Leblanc on the front with Post's description on the back.

== Societies and memberships ==
- Aero Club of America, secretary, founding member National Aeronautics Association
- Automobile Club of America (now American Automobile Association), founding member

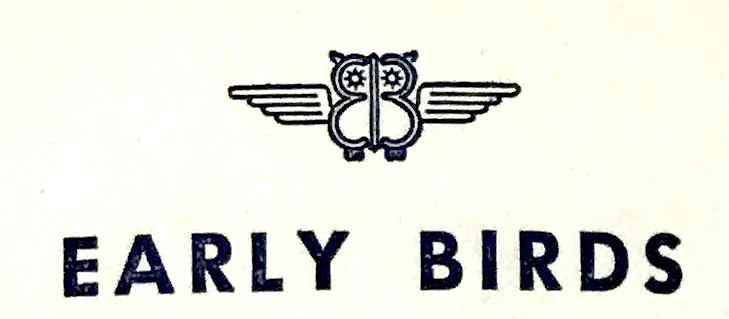
Early Birds

- Early Birds of Aviation
- Four Minute Men
- The Caterpillar Club (those saved from death by a parachute)
- Three Score and Ten Club
- Blizzard Men of '88
- Circumnavigators Club
- International Science Forum, director
- National Association for Music in Hospitals
- Norwich Society of New York, honorary member
- Boy Scouts of America, founding National Council member
- Music and Art Lovers' Club
- Musicians Club of New York, director
- Municipal Opera Association, Inc.
- Works Progress Administration of New York, honorary member and advisor
- The American Gilbert and Sullivan Association
- The Camp-Fire Club of America
- The National Aeronautic Association, Board of Governors
- Automobile Old Timers, lifetime member
- New York Symphony Chorus

== Notable associates ==
- Glenn Curtiss
- Orville and Wilbur Wright
- Alexander Graham Bell
- Calvin Coolidge
- Dwight Morrow
- Alfred P. Sloan
- Charles Lindbergh
- Daniel Carter Beard
- Frank P. Lahm
- Frederic Allen Williams
- Charles Jasper Glidden
- Alan R. Hawley
- Albert Leo Stevens
- Clara Adams
- Henry de La Vaulx
- Robert Peary
- Henry Woodhouse
