= Aero Club of America =

Aviation group (1905–1923)

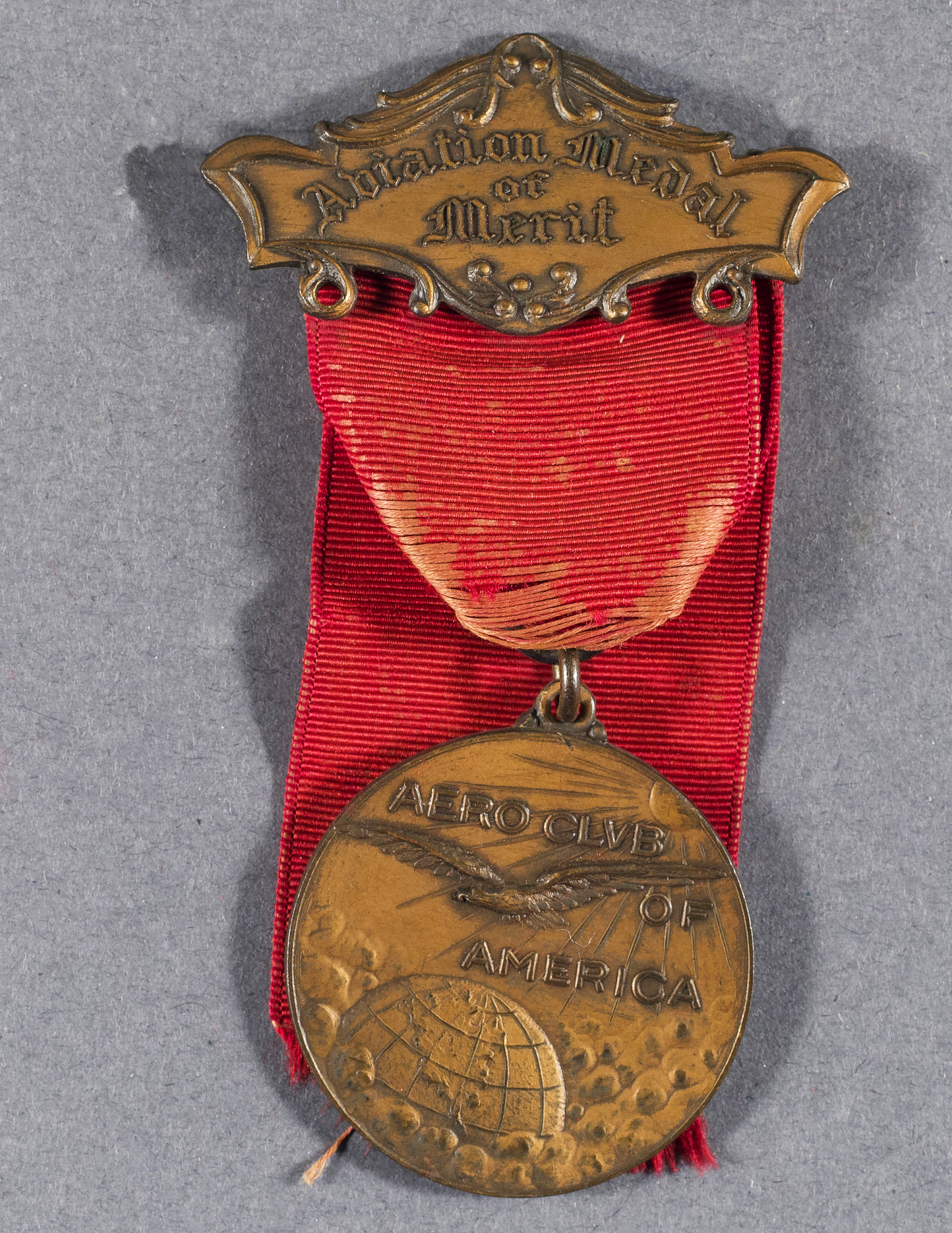
Aviation Medal of Merit issued by Aero Club of America, given to 33 military aviators who served in Britain and France during WWI.

The Aero Club of America was a social club formed in 1905 by Charles Jasper Glidden and Augustus Post, among others, to promote aviation in the United States. It was the parent organization of numerous state chapters, the first being the Aero Club of New England. It thrived until 1923, when it transformed into the National Aeronautic Association, which still exists today. It issued the first pilot's licenses in the United States, and successful completion of its licensing process was required by the United States Army for its pilots until 1914. It sponsored numerous air shows and contests. Cortlandt Field Bishop was president in 1910. Starting in 1911, new president Robert J. Collier began presenting the Collier Trophy.

== History ==
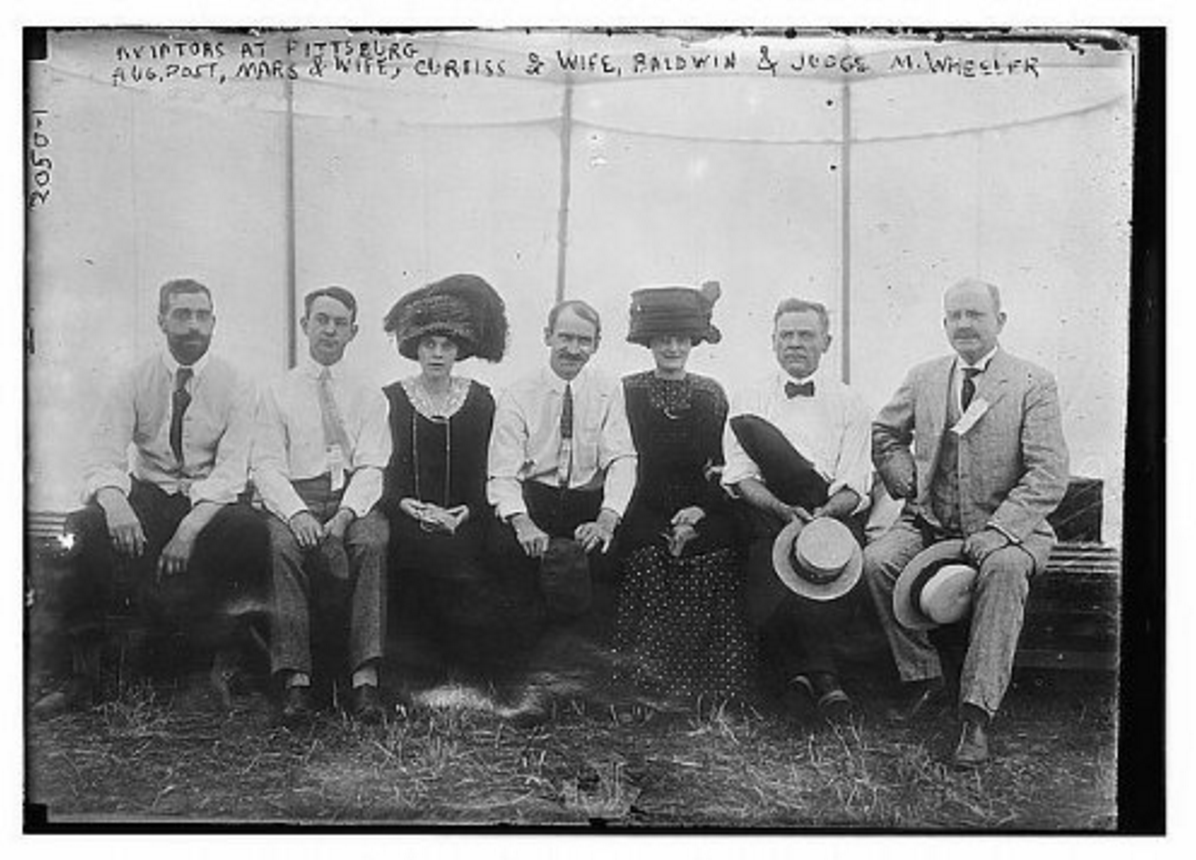
Augustus Post, Bud Mars and his wife, Glenn Curtis and Lena Curtiss, Thomas Scott Baldwin, and Judge Wheeler at air show in Pittsburgh – 1910.

Although conventional wisdom states that the Aero Club began in 1905, there are photos of high society and adventurers printed in 1902 with the stamp, "Aero Club". In the summer of 1905 several members of the Automobile Club of America including Charles Glidden, Homer Hedge, Dave Morris, John F. O'Rourke, and Augustus Post founded the Aero Club of America. They were avid balloonists but found little support in America for the sport of aviation. They determined to establish a new club with an organization similar to the Automobile Club but whose purpose was to promote aviation, much like the Aero Club of France. Homer Hedge became the first President and Augustus Post the first secretary.

In 1910, three different conventions were held in New York among aeronautical clubs and societies. The National Council of Affiliated Clubs of the Aero Club of America, was formed. Thirty-nine delegates, representing constituencies from Pasadena, California, to Boston, met at the Aero Club and formed the parent organization of various state chapters.

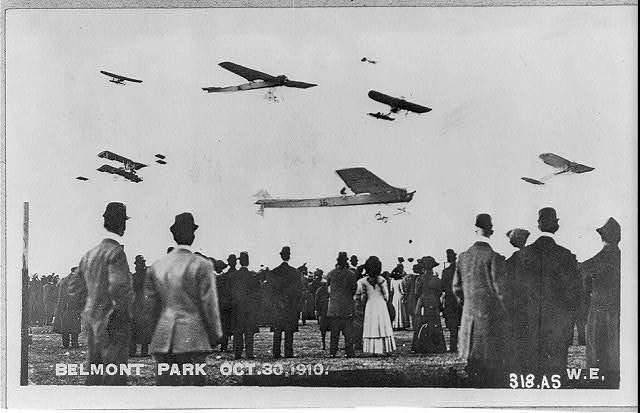
Photo composite of the 1910 event sponsored by the Aero Club of America "Crowd watching seven planes in air at the International Aviation Meet at Belmont Park, New York".

At the International Aviation Meet at Belmont Park in October 1910, a considerable controversy arose between the Englishman Claude Graham-White and the American J. B. Moisant. In one race around the Statue of Liberty, Graham-White won by several minutes, but due to a technicality, the race and considerable prize money was awarded to Moisant. John Armstrong Drexel made public statements accusing the organization of favoritism toward its own members, and Drexel held a competing dinner banquet at the same time as the awards banquet of the organization. The schism among the membership threatened the integrity of the organization, but was ultimately resolved with Drexel's resignation.

In 1911, the Aero Club of New York put on the First Industrial Airplane Show that was held in conjunction with the 11th U.S. International Auto Show at Manhattan's Grand Central Palace, in New York City. It was a spectacular event with prominent speakers, and an enthusiastic large crowd that would gaze upon a full-size airplane for the first time. It started December 31, 1910, until mid-January 1911.

In 1919, the secretary of the club, Augustus Post organized and drew up the rules for a transatlantic flight competition between New York and Paris. He worked with wealthy hotel owner Raymond Orteig in securing the $25,000 for the Orteig Prize. The $25,000 prize was to be awarded "to the first aviator of any Allied Country crossing the Atlantic in one flight, from Paris to New York or New York to Paris". After five years of failing to attract competitors, the award was then put under the control of a seven-member Bryant Bank board of trustees, which awarded it to Charles Lindbergh for his successful 1927 flight in the Spirit of St. Louis.

== Historical notes ==
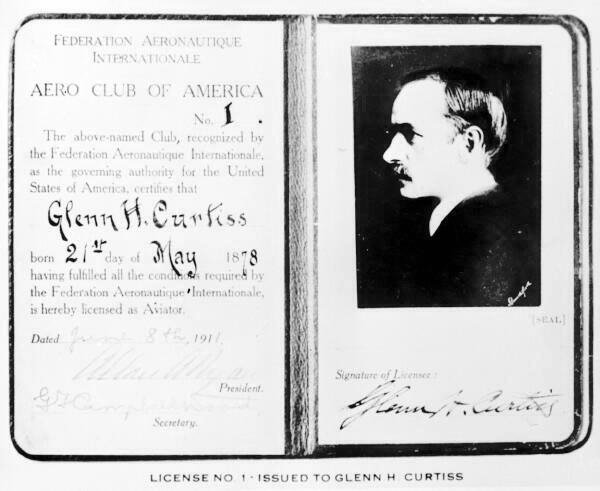
Glenn H. Curtiss's pilot license # 1 June 18th 1911.

Some of the later licenses issued by the Aero Club of America bore the printed signature of Orville Wright. Wright served for a time as Chairman of the Aero Club of America's Contest Committee. Contrary to popular myth, the Wright brothers were not issued licenses number 4 and 5 for malicious reasons. They were simply among the five pilots who had, in America, demonstrated their ability to fly airplanes before the Aero Club of America's licensing program began. Those first five licenses were issued in alphabetical order — a practice followed by other national organizations belonging to the FAI.

Pilot's licenses were not required by law (except by some states) until well after World War I. Aero Club of America licenses were required for participation in sporting events and demonstrations sanctioned by the ACA and FAI, and they gave credibility to pilots seeking to perform demonstration flights for hire, but many American pilots never applied for a license, which required a demonstration of flight proficiency. The ACA was also notorious for the inflexibility of its licensing process, which prescribed, among other items, a letter of application, a photograph of a candidate, appointment of an ACA examiner, and his report of examination, all of which had to be submitted in the correct form and sequence for a license to be issued, whether the candidate passed the flight test or not.

== National Aeroplane Fund ==
The National Aeroplane Fund was sanctioned by the Aero Club of America in response to perceived military and political disinterest in aeronautics. Established in summer 1915, the group lobbied Congress to increase funding for military aeronautics. The purpose of The American National Aeroplane Fund was to train aviators, provide aviation corps for the National Guard and Navy Militia of the States and U.S. Possessions, and put aeroplanes in use for the mail carrying service to inaccessible places, forming an aeronautical reserve, which while being used daily for peaceful purposes shall be ready for military service in case of need.

The National Aero Fund Letter, July 29, 1915 was written to Capt. Leroy Hall of the Vermont National Guard by Alan Hawley, President of the National Aeroplane Fund. It describes the various aeronautical demonstrations planned for the Vermont National Guard in August 1915. The National Aero Fund provided the airplane and pilot for the experiment, early bird aviator George A. Gray.

The letterhead contained the following information:

The U.S. Army and Navy have, together, less than twenty planes available. Only half a dozen of the licensed aviators of the United States have made flights of more than fifty miles, and none even know the rudiments of aeronautical requirements. Our Army, Navy, National Guard and Navy militia have had no experience in handling aircraft or operating with them.

If England, with 1,500 aeroplanes and aviators and the output of sixteen thousand men cannot supply sufficient aeroplanes for its forces - what could Uncle Sam - who has less than a score of aeroplanes - do in case of immediate need?

To provide an aeronautical reserve, the Governors of the Auto Club of America have started a public aeronautical subscription, similar to the French and German subscriptions of 1912-1913. These netted $1,222,969 and $1,808,626 respectively, and were used to train aviators and to procure aeroplanes. As the New York Sun says editorially, "Surely we in America, with our greater resources, can do even better."

French and German Air Fleet Built by Public Interest

The French and German aeroplane fleets of to-day were built largely by public subscriptions and through public interest. In February, 1912, soon after the first employment of aeroplanes in the French military manoeuvres demonstrated the potentiality of the ajr service, but the French Government failed to allow the appropriations necessary to secure an adequate aeronautical organization for the French Army, a public subscription was started.

In every part of France, the people-men and women, rich and poor, young and old, and of all beliefs and factions-united their efforts with the Press and political, social, professional and sportive organizations, and all contributed their share to give France a large aerial fleet. This public subscription brought 6,114,846 francs and gave France 208 aeroplanes, 62 landing stations for aeroplanes and 75 trained aviators. The public interest created by the subscription was tremendous and led to the immediate consideration of the aeronautical needs of France by the Government. By April, 1914, the French Army possessed 1,200 aeroplanes and 28 dirigibles, and most complete and efficient equipment.

Germany's aeroplane fleet was built almost entirely by the public subscription started by the Aerial League of Germany in 1912 which brought 7,234,506 marks. The purpose of the League was to train within the shortest time as large a number as possible of aviation pilots to form a reserve and to encourage the general development of aviation in Germany. Following are some of the results obtained;

The number of pilots was 230 at the end of 1912; it increased to 600 by the end of 1913; the constructors of aeroplanes were less than 20 in 1912, they increased to 50 by the end of 1913. The developments due to the efforts of the Aerial League led to Reichstag to pass a plan providing for an expenditure of $35,000,000 for military aeronautics in the following five years.

During the first month of 1914 the inducements offered by the Aerial League of Germany led to the breaking, by German aviators, of all the world records. By the middle of July, the non-stop endurance record was carried up to 24 hours and 12 minutes, by Reinhold Boehm, and the altitude record to 26,246 feet, by Heinrich Oelrich. Over one hundred other records, similar to the above were made. For instance, Basser and Landsmann made continuous flights of 18 hours 11 minutes and 21 hours 49 minutes respectively, in one of which Landsmann covered 1,336 miles, which is the longest distance ever traveled by man in one day. Among the records for altitude was the record of Otto Linnekogel of 21,654 feet- which is about the height of Mount McKinley!

Just as the people in every part of France and Germany-men and women, rich and poor, young and old, and of all beliefs and factions, united their efforts with the Press and political, social, professional and sporting organizations-we here in America can do the same.

== Notable licensees ==
Some notable early pilots issued licenses by the Aero Club of America are listed below.

=== Airplane division ===
- 01 Glenn Curtiss
- 02 Frank Purdy Lahm
- 03 Louis Paulhan, French aviator
- 04 Orville Wright (honorary)
- 05 Wilbur Wright (honorary)
- 06 Clifford B. Harmon
- 07 Thomas Scott Baldwin (1854–1923)
- 08 John Armstrong Drexel
- 09 Todd Shriver
- 10 Charles Foster Willard
- 11 James Cairn Mars (1875–1944)
- 13 Leon Richardson (1887-1951)
- 17 Eugene Ely
- 24 Charles Terres Weymann
- 25 Augustus Post
- 26 Ralph Clayton Diggins (1887–1959) of the Ralph C. Diggins Company. He was born on March 7, 1887, in Cadillac, Michigan and moved to Chicago, Illinois. He made his first flight in 1912 and was the 26th person in the United States to receive a pilot's license issued by the Aero Club of America. He died in 1959.
- 28 Theodore Gordon Ellyson
- 32 Edson Fessenden Gallaudet
- 35 William Redmond Cross, Governor, Aero Club of America, 1911-1921
- 37 Harriet Quimby, first woman
- 44 Matilde Moisant, second woman
- 55 Norman Prince, early member of the Lafayette Escadrille
- 57 Paul Peck, one of the first US army pilots.
- 133 Julia Clark, third woman
- 148 Katherine Stinson (1891–1977) fourth woman. She convinced flight instructor Max Lillie of Chicago to take her on as a student in 1912. Katherine became the fourth licensed female pilot in the U.S., she began touring as a stunt pilot and became one of the country's most famous female aviators.
- 164 Walter Johnson (1888-1961) Test pilot for the Thomas Brothers and Glenn Curtiss.
- 173 Bernetta Adams Miller, fifth woman.
- 188 Ruth Bancroft Law, aka Ruth Law Oliver, sixth woman.
- 303 Marjorie Stinson, (sister of Katherine) the ninth licensed female pilot in the United States.
- 354 Albert Daniel Smith (1887-1970).
- 440 Reginald Malcolm, World War I flying ace

denotes a female aviator

=== Seaplane (Hydroaeroplane) division ===
- 01 Adolph G. Sutro
- 02 Lieutenant Alfred Austell Cunningham (USN)
- 03 Lieutenant B. B. Smith (USN)
- 04 Lieutenant Commander Patrick Nieson Lynch Bellinger (USN)
- 05 Ensign Godfrey DeCourcelles Chevalier (USN)
- 06 Logan Archbold Vilas
- 07 William Ellwood Doherty
- 08 H. P. Harris
- 09 Ernest C. Bass
- 10 Steve MacGordon
- 26 Roger Weightman Jannus (1886-1918)

=== Balloon division ===
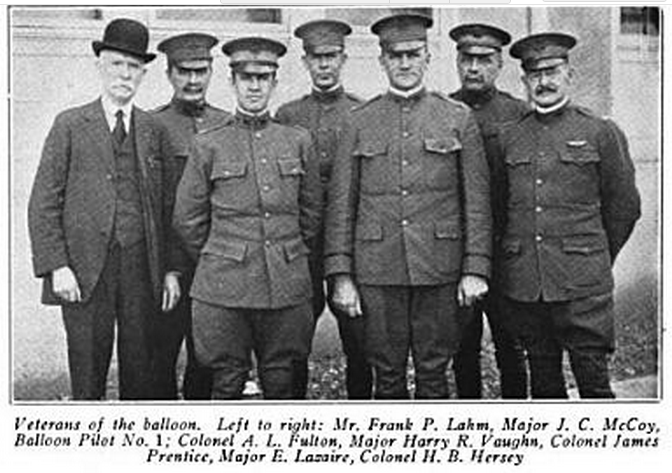

See who's who of ballooning.

- 01 Major James C. McCoy (USA)
- 02 Albert Leo Stevens
- 03 Frank Samuel Lahm
- 04 Colonel Frank Purdy Lahm (USA)
- 05 Carl E. Meyers
- 06 Colonel Henry B. Hersey (USA)
- 07 Allan R. Hawley
- 08 Colonel Charles deForest Chandler (USA)
- 09 Thomas Scott Baldwin (1854–1923)
- 10 Albert C. Triaca
- 11 Augustus Post
- 27 Sylvester Louis Von Phul (1878–1911)
- 533 Harry Rasmussen (1886–1968)

=== Airship (Dirigible) division ===
Note: "Dirigible" simply meant that the airship could be made to go in any direction.

- 01 Major Thomas Scott Baldwin (1854–1923)
- 02 Brigadier General Frank Purdy Lahm (1887-1963)
- 03 Captain Horace Bird Wild (1879-1940)
- 04 Augustus Roy Knabenshue (1875-1960)
- 05 Albert Leo Stevens (1877-1944)
- 06 Frank W. Goodale
- 07 Ralph Hazlett Upson (1888-1968)
- 08 Ralph Albion Drury Preston (?-1954)
- 09 Walter J. Pouchot
- 10 Noel Chadwick

== Presidents ==
- Charles Jasper Glidden 1905 to 1910
- Cortlandt Field Bishop 1910 to 1913
- Alan Ramsay Hawley 1913 to ?
- Jonathan Gaffney 2007 to present

== See also ==
Other Aero clubs

- National Aeronautic Association, the ACA's direct American successor (1922)
- Aéro-Club de France (1898)
- Royal Aero Club (1901)
- Early Birds of Aviation
