= Curtiss Flying School =

Early Flight School

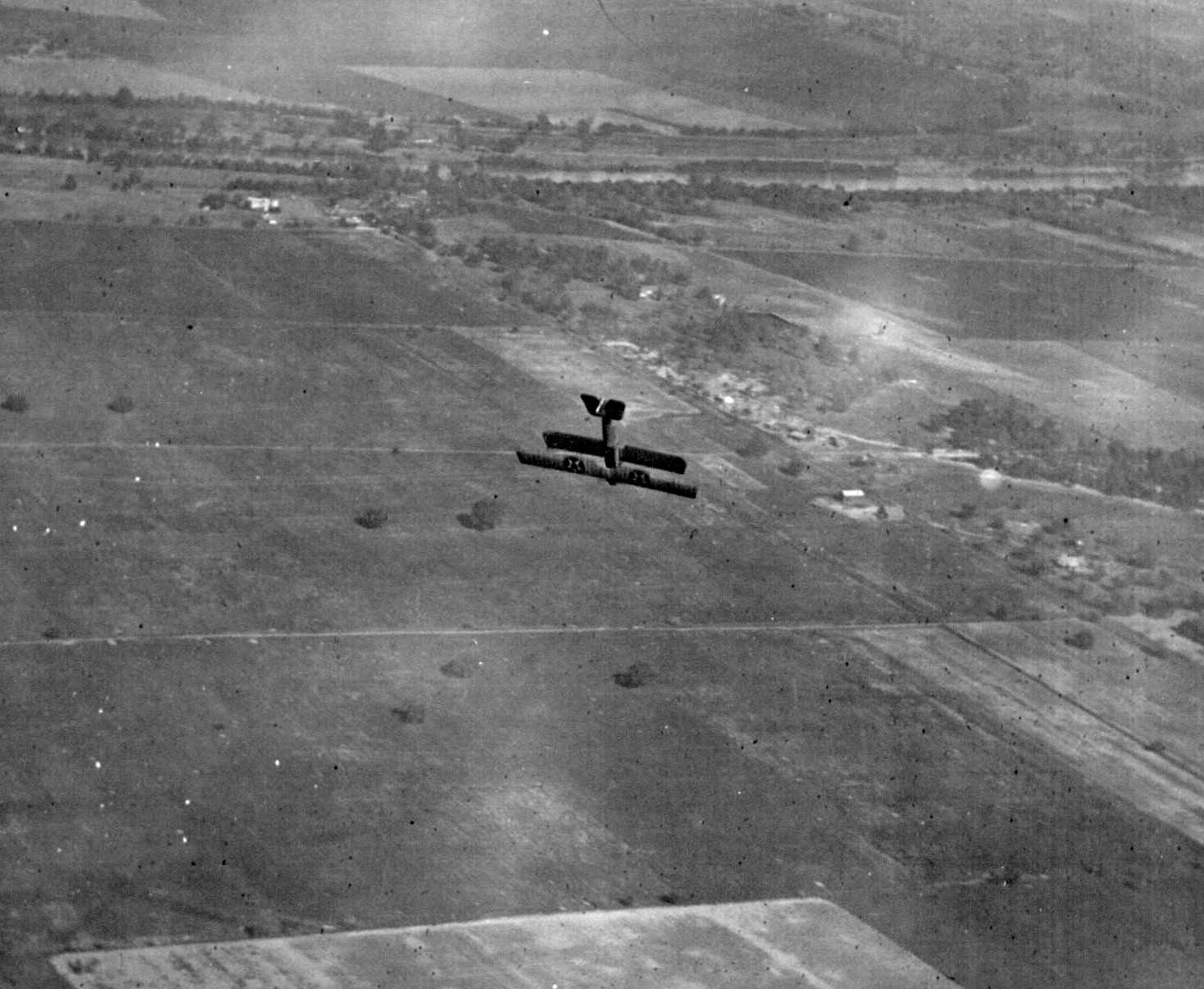
A Curtiss Jenny on a training flight

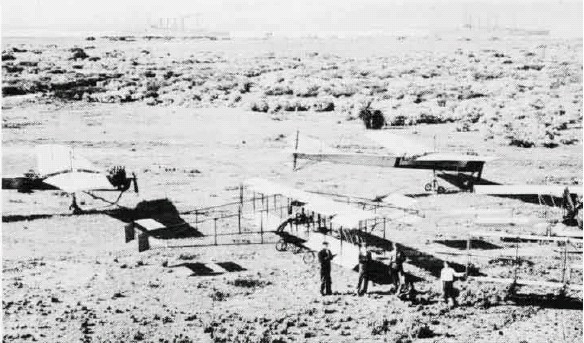
Curtiss Flying School at North Island, San Diego, California in 1911

The Curtiss Flying School was started by Glenn Curtiss to compete against the Wright Flying School of the Wright brothers. The first example was located in San Diego, California.

The Wright brothers had a keen interest in their competition, sending the lesser known Lorin Wright to spy and take photographs at the New York facility for a 1914 lawsuit.

Curtiss started the Atlantic Coast Aeronautical Station on a 20-acre tract east of Newport News (VA) Boat Harbor in the Fall of 1915 with Captain Thomas Scott Baldwin as head. Many civilian students, including Canadians, later became World War I flyers. Victor Carlstrom, Vernon Castle, Eddie Stinson and Gen Billy Mitchell trained here. The school was disbanded in 1922.

Students would work toward completing the Aero Club of America pilot's license. The initial cost was one dollar a minute for the four-hundred-minute course ($8,600 in 2010 dollars). In 1917 the U.S. Army took over operations during World War I. After the war, control reverted to Curtiss, who closed Newport operations in 1922.

A large variety of aircraft were used for training, mostly designed and built by Curtiss, and still undergoing flight testing. Among the fleet included the first aircraft to take off from water.

By 1929, the Aeronautical Chamber of Commerce took over licensing of aviation schools. Curtiss schools were registered and required to give two weeks of ground school instruction to new pilots.

== Locations ==
- 1910 San Diego, California. Training in the Curtiss Model D.
- 1912 Miami, Florida. Two 200 foot by 800 foot airstrips were provided by the city, with funding to ship in four training aircraft. This was the first flying service school, which eventually was donated to a Naval Air Base
- 1913 Hammondsport, New York
- 1915 Toronto, Ontario, Canada Long Branch Aerodrome, Training in the Curtiss JN-3.
- 1915 Newport News, Virginia Harbor. Site of training for the Canadian Royal Flying Corps. Disbanded in 1922.
- 1918 Camp Claudio, Parañaque, Philippine Islands. Training site of the Philippine Air Service and the Philippine Constabulary Air Corps, which were the forerunners of the Philippine Army Air Corps and Philippine Air Force.
- 1929 Stratford, Connecticut Shortly afterward became Curtiss-Wright Flying School. The historic Curtis Hangar still stands. Howard Hughes and Charles Lindbergh once frequented the hangar. Amelia Earhart kept a plane there. It was home to the prototype for the Vought F4U Corsair Lindbergh was a Corsair test pilot.

== Instructors ==
The following were instructors in 1915:

- Walter Edwin Lees
- Victor Carlstrom
- Victor Vernon
- Jimmy Johnson (aviator)
- Carl Batts
- Steve MacGordon
- Ted Hequemburg
- Lawrence Leon
- Bertrand Blanchard Acosta
- Andrew Cogswell

== Students ==
- Agustín Parlá Orduña (1877-1946) in 1912.
- Fred Banbury (1893-1918) in 1916.
- Lincoln Beachey (1887–1915) in 1910.
- Joseph Bennett (aviator).
- Morris Maxey Titterington (1891–1928) in 1914.
- Harold Frederick Pitcairn (1891-1960) in 1916.
- Arthur Whealy (1895-1945) in 1916.
