= Automobile Club of America =

First car club in America (1899–1932)

The Automobile Club of America (ACA) was the first automobile club formed in the United States in 1899. The club was dissolved in 1932 following the Great Depression and declining membership.

== History ==
=== Early history ===
On June 7, 1899, a group of gentlemen auto racers met at the Waldorf-Astoria Hotel in Manhattan and founded the Automobile Club of America. The Automobile Club of America was officially incorporated on August 15, 1899, in order to "maintain a social club devoted to the sport of automobilism and to its development throughout the country". The original directors of the club were: Frank C. Hollister, Charles R. Flint, George Moore Smith, Winslow E. Busby, Whitney Lyon, George F. Chamberlain, Homer W. Hedge, and William Henry Hall of New York City and V. Everit Macy of Scarborough-on-Hudson. While it was called the Automobile Club of America, it was really a local organization. It was a founding member of the American Automobile Association (AAA) in 1902.

In 1907, the organization built its clubhouse, which was essentially a garage at 247 West 54th Street with a terra-cotta exterior. Architect Ernest Flagg "designed a sophisticated factorylike building with great banks of metal windows, set in a rich screen of glazed terra cotta, particularly fulsome on the second floor. There, a double-height assembly hall, modeled on one at Château de Cheverny in the Loire Valley, ran 100 feet across the building’s front, adjacent to a grill room on the same scale at the back."

=== Feud with AAA ===
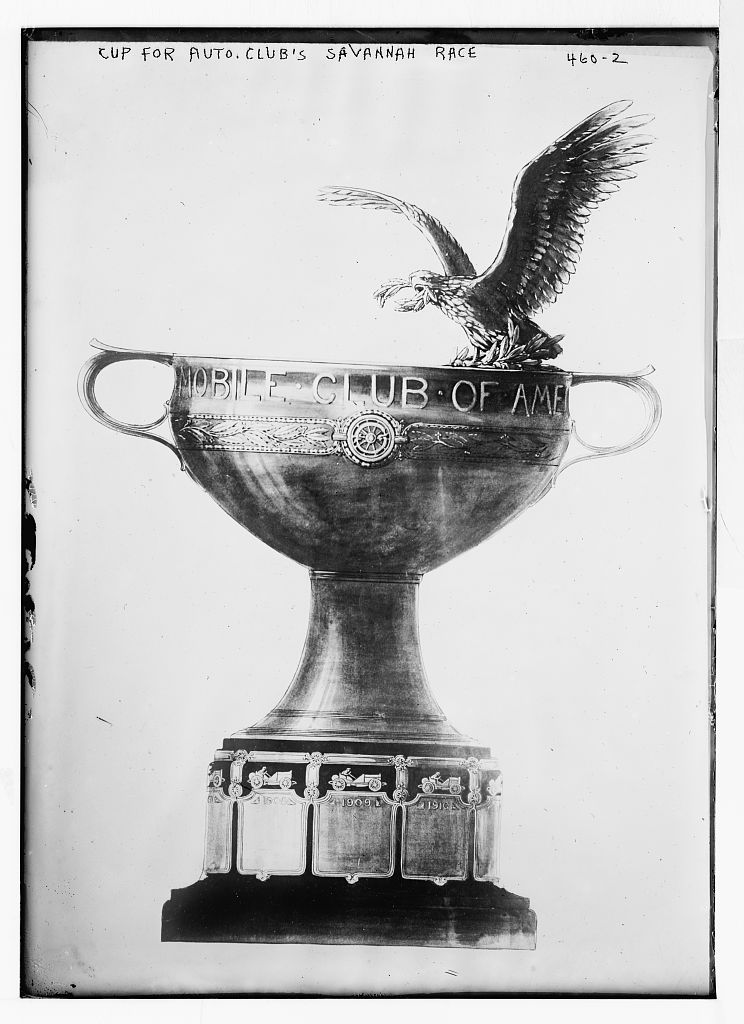
Trophy of the ACA-sanctioned American Grand Prize

In 1908, the AAA increased their membership dues, leading to a falling out with the ACA. The Automobile Club of America (ACA) created the American Grand Prize, the first traces of Grand Prix style racing in the U.S. along, and in competition with, the then established Vanderbilt Cup – sanctioned by the AAA's Racing Board. This race escalated the feud between the ACA and the AAA. Later in 1908 it was decided that AAA would sanction all big time racing nationally and the ACA would sanction all international events held on American soil. On December 2, 1908, AAA dissolved the Racing Board and created the Contest Board soon after. Though the rationale for this decision has been lost with time, the move was most likely done to allow AAA to oversee all automobile events and not just racing contests.

=== Post-1908 ===
In 1909, after the number of members looking for garage space doubled, the club built an addition on West 55th Street. By 1910, membership in the club was up to 1,000. In 1923, however, the club sold the complex and the original buildings were converted to other uses before being torn down in 2008.

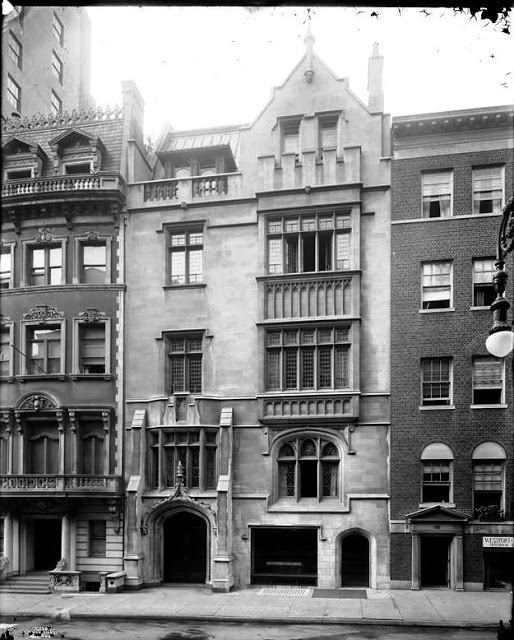
Depicted in 1925 as the Automobile Club of America clubhouse

The club relocated to the former Fisk-Harkness townhouse at 12 East 53rd Street and separately negotiated blocks of space in garages around Manhattan. The Fisk–Harkness House had 28,000 square feet (2,600 m^{2}), which represented an increase of 8,000 square feet (740 m^{2}) over the club's existing space in the automobile district south of Columbus Circle. Furthermore, 12 East 53rd Street was close to several other clubhouses along Fifth Avenue, including those of the University Club, Union Club, Calumet Club, Knickerbocker Club, and Metropolitan Club. The Club received a $190,000 mortgage on the new building in early 1924. After undergoing $100,000 worth of renovations, the clubhouse was dedicated in April 1925. The clubhouse was among the locations where New York license plates were distributed. Events hosted at the house included a luncheon with a League of Nations Non-Partisan Association official, an annual session of the National Highway Traffic Administration, as well as bridge games and tea dances. In the 1920s, the ACA quietly rejoined the AAA.

=== Decline and demise ===
The club had a peak membership of 6,000, but following the Great Depression in the United States, several thousand members left the club. As a result, in January 1932, the Automobile Club's governors voted to dissolve the club. The East 53rd Street building was placed for sale at a foreclosure auction that August, and it was sold to the Mutual Life Insurance Company of New York for $50,000. The building was later renovated into the showroom of art dealer Symons Galleries in 1938.

== Prominent members ==
Among the prominent members of the Club were:

- Charles R. Flint
- Homer Hedge
- V. Everit Macy
- Grant B. Schley
- Arthur H. Woods
- Edmund L. Baylies
- James A. Blair Jr.
- Egerton L. Winthrop Jr.
- James A. Burden Jr.
- Chauncey M. Depew
- Elbert H. Gary
- Alan R. Hawley
- Hamilton Fish Kean
- Clarence H. Mackay
- Juliana Cutting
- William W. Miller
- Dudley Olcott
- Percy Avery Rockefeller
- Henry Rogers Winthrop II
- Henry R. Taylor

== See also ==
- Automobile Racing Club of America (ARCA)
- American Automobile Association (AAA)
- United States Auto Club (USAC)
- Sports Car Club of America (SCCA)
