= Albert Daniel Smith =

American pioneer aviator

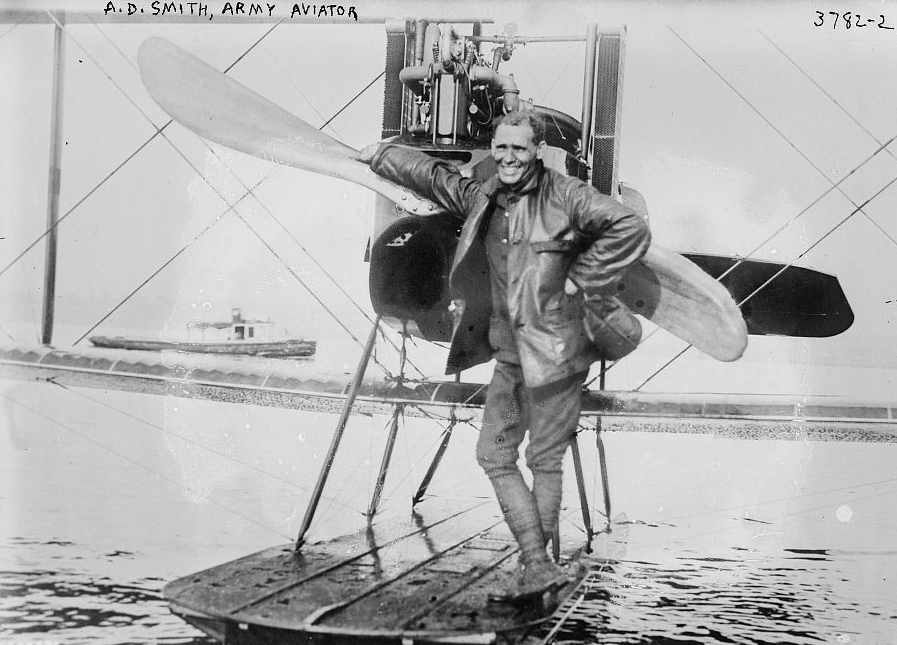
Albert Daniel Smith was a pioneer aviator, here in 1916

Albert Daniel Smith (February 6, 1887 – January 20, 1970) was a pioneer aviator and later a Brigadier General.

== Biography ==
He was born on February 6, 1887. He trained to fly and was awarded Aero Club of America license #354.

Albert D. Smith won an American Hydroplane duration record on February 19, 1916

In March 1918 he crashed at Wright Field in Dayton, Ohio and was injured.

He arranged the first transcontinental flight for the United States Army in 1918. Under his command the first transcontinental flight for the United States Army was made in 1918 using four JN-4 aircraft. On December 4, 1918, they left San Diego, California. They landed Jacksonville, Florida on December 22, 1918.

In 1919 he joined Henry H. Arnold's Northwestern Forest Fire Patrol and was released from service in 1923 because of his disability from his previous crash.

He died on January 20, 1970, in Newport Beach, California.
