= Glidden Tour =

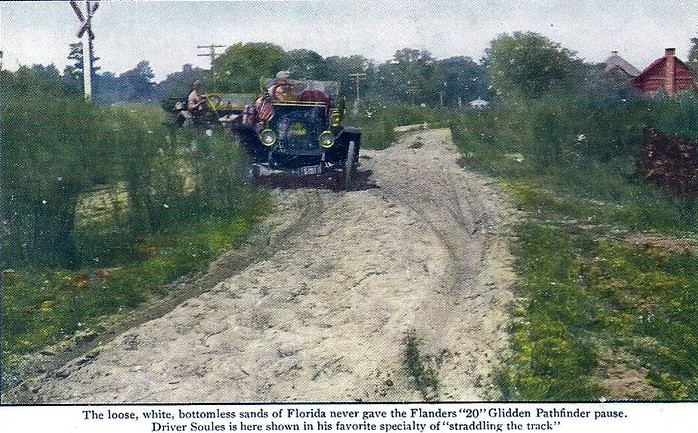
Postcard of a Flanders 20 serving as the pathfinder car to lay out the 1911 route from New York to Jacksonville, Florida.

The Glidden Tours, also known as the National Reliability Runs, were promotional events held during the automotive Brass Era by the American Automobile Association (AAA) and organized by the group's chairman, Augustus Post. The AAA, a proponent of safer roads, acceptance of the automobile, and automotive-friendly legislation, started the tour to promote public acceptance and bring awareness of their goals.

The original Glidden Tours were held from 1905 to 1913. They were named after Charles J. Glidden, a financier and automobile enthusiast, who presented the AAA with a trophy first awarded to the winner of the 1905 tour. The initial tour was pre-dated by the 1904 "St. Louis Tour."

The 1906 Glidden Tour was the first motorsport competition to use a checkered flag. Sidney Walden divided the course into sections with the time check at the end of each section being performed by officials called "checkers." These checkers used checkered flags to identify themselves.

The first two days of the 1907 edition of the Glidden Auto Tour were marred by a number of accidents that resulted in the death of one man, Thomas J. Clark, lifelong friend and partner of John K. Stewart, and four other persons severely injured. While trying to make a sharp angle in the road preparatory to crossing a bridge, about two miles east of Bryan, Ohio, Mr. Clark lost control of his Packard that jumped over an embankment. The car turned over and he was crushed between the steering wheel, suffering several ribs broken and serious internal injuries, from which he succumbed four days later at Bryan hospital. It is believed that Mr. Clark was demonstrating the Stewart speedometer on the 1907 Glidden Auto Tour.

At the turn of the century automobile travel was difficult as the road systems around the world were generally not well suited for the horseless carriage.

To bring more awareness and sponsorship to the event, the AAA announced that the tour would be a "reliability and endurance" tour, a type of road rally. This attracted automobile manufacturers who competed to test their vehicles and use the events for advertising.

The tours were gruelling events: cars broke down, were damaged by accidents, and encountered nearly impassable roads. Drivers and teams did repairs on the run and helped out other drivers having difficulties.

The tours went several hundred miles in the US and occasionally into Canada with time limits between check points and a point scoring system to determine a winner of each event. The time limits caused some problems with the inhabitants of where the tour traveled through as autos scared horses, caused personal and property damage and sometimes appeared to not care.

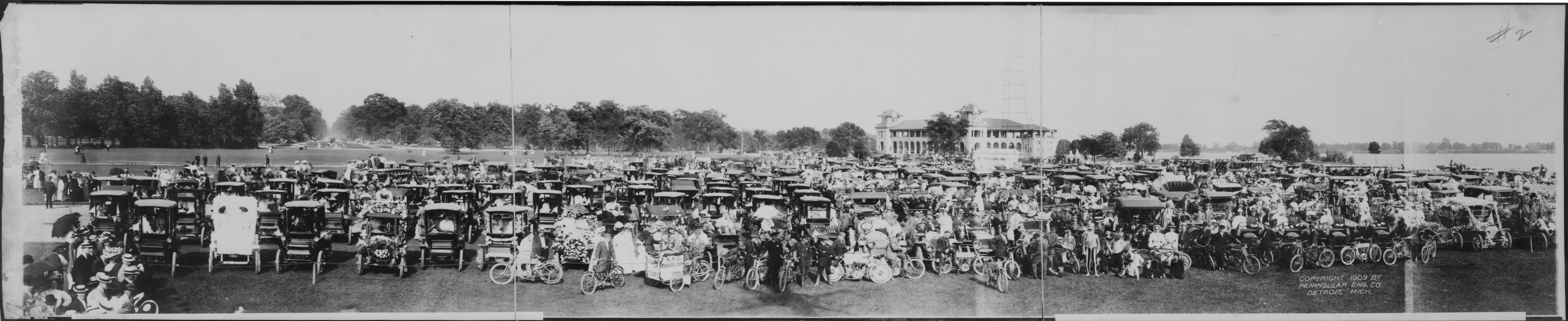
1909 Glidden Tour Parade at Belle Isle Park, Detroit

== Revival ==
Glidden Trophy

The Glidden Tours were revived in 1946 by the Veteran Motor Car Club of America (VMCCA) and have continued since with antique cars traveling premarked routes and stopping in local towns to show off their vehicles, many people dressed in period costume. Original founder Augustus Post participated in every Glidden Tour until his death in 1952. In 1954, Dr. Jay Rice Moody was given the Col. Augustus Post Memorial Award by the AAA in recognition for his role in reestablishing the Glidden Auto Tours, and maintaining the spirit of the original tours as founded by Post.

The silver Glidden trophy is still presented to the winner of the event.
