= Homer Hedge =

Capt. Homer W. Hedge
- Born: 29 September 1863; Norwich, Connecticut, U.S.
- Died: September 10, 1909 (aged 45)
- Spouse: Marie J. Jumpe

Captain Homer Washington Hedge (September 29, 1863, Norwich, Connecticut – September 10, 1909) was a advertising executive in New York City. He helped to found both the Automobile Club of America (currently known as the American Automobile Association) and the Aero Club of America. He was a balloonist and competed in the sport of balloon racing.

== Biography ==
At the age of 25, in 1888, Hedge joined the First Signal Corp. of the National Guard in New York City. He worked out of their recruiting office until 1898. By the end of this period, he had risen to the rank of captain. He was referred to as "Captain" for the remainder of his life.

Hedge managed the Manhattan offices of Pettingill & Company, a large New York advertising agency. In April 1904, he purchased the New York offices, and it became the Homer W. Hedge Company. At the time, this was one of the largest advertising agencies in the U.S. Their customers included Equitable Life Insurance, the Electric Vehicle Company, and the Remington Arms Company.

On June 7, 1899, a group of auto racers met at the Waldorf-Astoria Hotel in Manhattan and founded the Automobile Club of America, an organization that became the American Automobile Association. At that meeting, Homer W. Hedge was elected secretary, a post he retained for one year.

In 1905, Hedge became Founder and first President of the Aero Club of America. Hedge was the author of a book on ballooning, The American Aeronaut (1907).
