= Charles Jasper Glidden =

American telephone financier and automobile promoter (1857–1927)

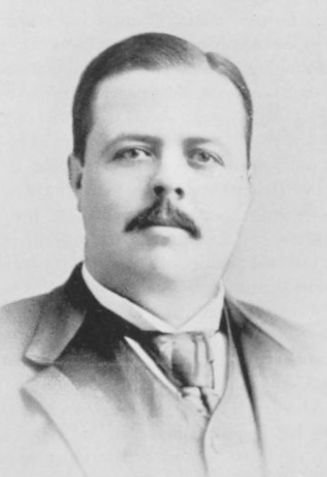
- Born: August 29, 1857; Lowell, Massachusetts
- Died: September 11, 1927 (aged 70); Boston, Massachusetts
- Spouse: Lucy Emma Clegworth (m. 1878–1927)

Charles Jasper Glidden (August 29, 1857 – September 11, 1927) was an American telephone pioneer, financier and promoter of the automobile in the United States. Charles Glidden, with his wife Lucy, were the first (in 1902) to circle the world in an automobile, and repeated the feat in 1908.

== Biography ==
Glidden was born in Lowell, Massachusetts on August 29, 1857. He was the adopted child of Nathaniel Glidden and Laura Clark. He came from a family that had arrived in America by 1664. His professional career began at the age of 15. At 20, he was Branch Manager for the Atlantic and Pacific Telegraph Company. He recognized early the potential of the phone together and experimented together with Alexander Graham Bell with telephone connections over the telegraph lines. Glidden funded the construction of telephone lines in Manchester, New Hampshire and was the first to recognize that the female voice was more suitable for the early telephones than the male. Accordingly, he hired women as telephone operators. The telephone exchange, which he had initiated, grew to a syndicate, which, amongst others, covered the U.S. states of Ohio, Minnesota, Arkansas, and Texas. The first long-distance telephone connection (from Lowell, Massachusetts to Boston) was established on his initiative.

On July 10, 1878, he married Lucy Emma Clegworth from Manchester, New Hampshire.

Charles Glidden believed that the automobile was not just a toy for the rich, but would develop into a serious means of transport. This required building confidence in the fledgling horseless carriage and a sound road system. (At this time, major travel was usually undertaken by train or by river steamer.) In 1901, he sold his company to Bell and pursued these new goals as a private man. That same year, he and his wife made a successful trip to the Arctic Circle.

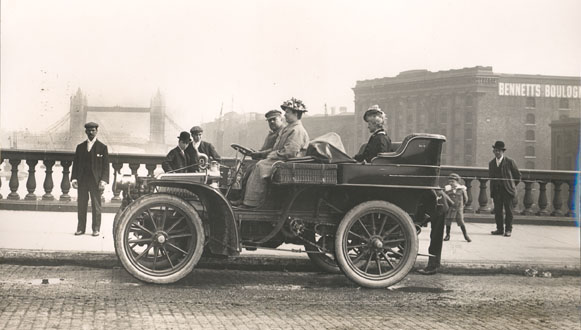
Glidden in a Napier car with his wife Lucy in London in 1902

In 1902, he undertook a world tour in a British Napier accompanied by his wife and Charles Thomas, a motor engineer from Rottingdean in Sussex, England. This more than unusual journey took him over 46,528 miles through 39 countries and ultimately around the world twice. He travelled countries which never before had seen an automobile. The prerequisite for this undertaking was meticulous preparation. He even travelled with special wheels to enable him to ride on railroad tracks. Always impeccably dressed, he was very much aware of the publicity from which he took advantage of the automotive sector. So he corresponded with countless local and international newspapers. In this way, he traveled to virtually all continents until 1908.

== The Glidden Tour ==
In 1904, he took part in the first reliability race organized by the American Automobile Association (AAA), from New York to St. Louis. Because he thought this should be a recurring event, he donated a silver trophy and a (for the time) very large prize of 2000 U.S. dollars, which he repeated annually. The AAA Glidden organized this "Glidden Reliability Tour" regularly from 1905 to 1913. The aim was to travel a certain distance within a specified time frame without any checkpoints. A points system decided the winner.

The first Glidden Tour was perceived as too easy, and the participants voted a winner. This was not, however, Charles Glidden with his Napier, but Percy Pierce in his impressive Pierce-Arrow. In subsequent races, the course grew ever longer and more demanding.

The Glidden Tour was never a trip. It always included several new routes over one hundred miles of practically trackless areas in the U.S. and occasionally in Canada. Many cars were unable to withstand the brutal treatment, and there were also incidents, such as horses shying away. But it was a matter of honor that all the teams should stay together, and Glidden said that he paid tolls to some local authorities and refunded farmers' poultry from his own pockets.

The victory in a Glidden Tour became a matter of prestige, as more and more manufacturers participated and were motivated to succeed by the marketing benefits.

In 1946, the Glidden Tour was recreated by the Veteran Motor Car Club of America (later under the auspices of the Antique Automobile Club of America) and has been carried out every year since then, but in a more tourist-like frame and using veteran vehicles instead. It is regarded as the oldest and most prestigious event of its kind in the United States, and the winner is still handed the silver trophy that Charles Glidden donated in 1905.

== Later life ==
His own travels continued. From 1905 to 1910, he was the first president of the Aero Club of America. From 1908, he began to promote aviation. He praised the lighter than air technology (balloon flight) and was of the opinion that private planes would be similarly ubiquitous as motorcycles.

Charles Jasper Glidden died of cancer at his home in Boston on September 11, 1927.
