= Steve MacGordon =

American aviator

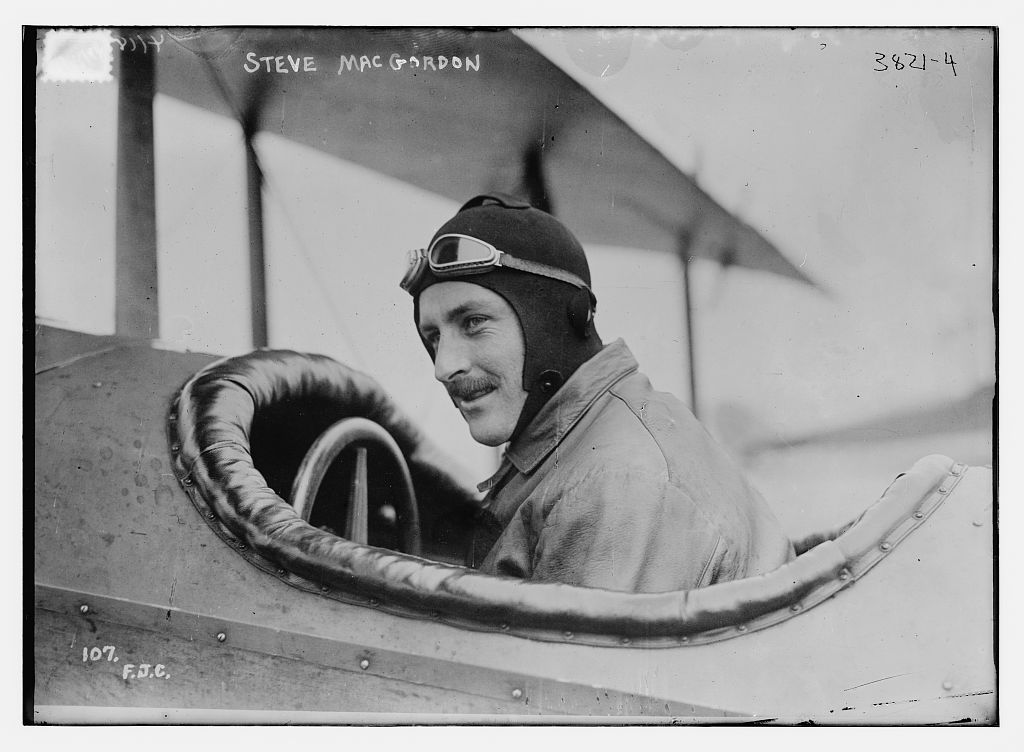
- MacGordon circa 1915
- Born: Stephenson MacGordon; February 29, 1892; Menominee, Michigan
- Died: June 6, 1916 (aged 24); Newport News, Virginia

Stephenson MacGordon (February 29, 1892 – June 6, 1916) was a record-holding pioneer aviator who died in a crash in 1916.

== Biography ==
He was born on February 29, 1892, in Menominee, Michigan, to Charles Hackley McGordon (1871–1921).

He was an instructor at the Curtiss Flying School.

He died on June 6, 1916, in Newport News, Virginia, when the tail of his plane lifted during landing. His propeller hit the runway and a fire killed him. His student in the rear seat escaped with minor injuries.
