= Alan R. Hawley =

Alan Ramsay Hawley
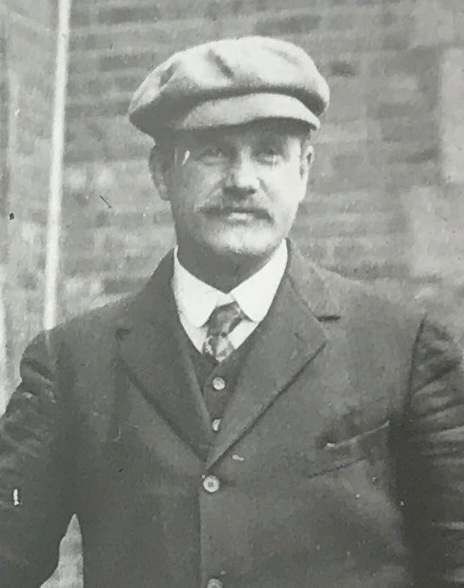
- Alan Hawley in New York (1910)
- Born: July 29, 1864; Perth Amboy, New Jersey, U.S.
- Died: February 16, 1938 (aged 73); Manhattan, New York, U.S.
- Education: Trinity School
- Occupation: President of the Aero Club of America
- Parent(s): Peter William Radcliffe Hawley (1829–1884); Isabella Meritt (1838–1904)

Alan Ramsay Hawley (July 29, 1864 – February 16, 1938) was one of the early aviators in the United States. In 1910, he won the national race with his balloon America II alongside his aide and life-long friend Augustus Post. Hawley was the first passenger to fly in an airplane from New York City to Washington, D.C., in May 1916. He was the president of the Aero Club of America from 1913 to 1918.

== Biography ==
He was born on 29 July 1869 in Perth Amboy, New Jersey, to Peter William Radcliffe Hawley (1829–1884) and Isabella Meritt (1838–1904). He attended the Trinity School in New York City before becoming a stockbroker with his brother, William Hawley, until he retired in 1912.

On January 1, 1907, he ascended with Major James C. McCoy in a 35,000-cubic-foot (990 m^{3}) balloon Orient in St. Louis, Missouri.

On April 22, 1907, he ascended over one mile (1.6 km) in his balloon with Arthur T. Atherolt.

He entered the 1910 Gordon Bennett International Balloon Race with Augustus Post and they left the grounds of the Aero Club of St. Louis at 5:45 p.m. on Monday, October 17, 1910, in their balloon America II. The balloon had been specially constructed in France for this race and was owned by Major James C. McCoy. During the flight they took watches of three hours each, "one sleeping and one watching the statiscopes, aneroid, and other instruments" (sic). A recording barograph (altimeter) kept a precise log of their altitude during the flight. They reached altitudes of 5,000 meters (16,000 feet) above the altitude of St. Louis, their 0 altitude reference point. St. Louis is at 140 meters (460 feet) above sea level. 46 hours later, at 3:45 p.m. on Wednesday, 19 October they landed in the middle of the wilderness in Quebec, Canada, about 58 miles (93 km) north of Chicoutimi. They had been forced to land because of a storm. They were on a hillside at some 1,500 feet (460 m) altitude and had traveled 1,887.6 kilometers (1,172.9 miles) from St. Louis. They had traveled at an average of 50 kilometres per hour (30 miles per hour). The next day they traveled south towards the last inhabited area they had passed over. Hawley was slowed by an ankle twisted just after landing. For the next three days they walked, sleeping under their blankets at night and eating a bare minimum of food. They eventually came upon a trapper's hut, at the edge of Lake St. John, which was not occupied at that moment. They rested there for a day, after which two French Canadian men out on a hunting trip arrived and agreed to help them. The trappers took them to Saint-Ambroise-de-Kildare, Quebec. Once there, they sent telegrams to family and the Aero Club to let them know they were alright. The message Hawley sent to his brother read: "Landed in wilderness week ago, fifty miles north of Chicoutimi. Both well —Alan." Their telegrams ended searches which had various parties had started, looking for them around the Great Lakes. Clifford B. Harman, a wealthy amateur aeronaut and aviator, had offered $1,000 to anyone who found Hawley and Post, dead or alive. On the evening before their telegrams were sent, Harmon had increased the reward to $7,000.

He died of coronary thrombosis on February 16, 1938, at age 73 at his home, 400 Park Avenue.
