= Richard A. Stratton =

United States Navy officer and social worker (1931–2025)

Richard Allen Stratton
- Stratton c. 1982
- Born: October 14, 1931; Quincy, Massachusetts, U.S.
- Died: January 18, 2025 (aged 93)
- Spouse: Alice Marie Stratton
- Children: 3
- Military career
- Allegiance: United States of America
- Branch: United States Navy; Massachusetts National Guard
- Service years: MNG: 1947–1948; USN: 1955–1986
- Rank: Captain
- Nicknames: Dick; Beak
- Units: 221st Cavalry Squadron; Chief, Naval Advanced Training; ATU-203; USS Ranger (CV-61); Carrier Air Wing Nine; VFA-94; USS Ticonderoga (CV-14); Carrier Air Wing 19; VFA-192
- Commands: Navy Recruiting District, New York; Navy Recruiting Area 5
- Conflicts: Vietnam War
- Awards: Silver Star; Legion of Merit (3); Bronze Star Medal; Purple Heart; Meritorious Service Medal (2); Air Medal (2)
- Other work: Licensed Clinical Social Worker

Richard Allen Stratton (October 14, 1931 – January 18, 2025) was an American Naval Aviator (No. V-11444) and a clinical social worker. He served as lieutenant commander during the Vietnam War from 1966 to 1973. He served on the USS Ticonderoga (CVA-14)/Air Wing 19/Attack Squadron VA-192. Richard flew 22 combat missions, earned two Air Medals and the Combat Action Ribbon. After capture by the North Vietnamese on January 5, 1967, he served with the Fourth Allied POW Wing, Hanoi, DRVN. He earned the Silver Star for his valor and leadership while a prisoner of war.

His post service career was as a clinical social worker licensed to practice in Rhode Island and Florida. He has also served as a national certified addiction counselor, Level I, and has served as the chairman of the Department of Veterans Affairs Advisory Committee on Prisoners of War from 1989 to 1995.

== Early life and education ==
Stratton was born on October 14, 1931, in Quincy, Massachusetts. His father was Charles Arthur Stratton (1902–1975) of South Boston, Massachusetts. His father was a veteran of WW I (U.S. Navy) and WW II (Massachusetts State Guard). His mother was Mary Loretta (Hoar) Stratton (1903–1989) of Somerville, Massachusetts. Richard had a brother named Charles A. Stratton Jr. (1930–1988), who was a Veteran of the Korean War (U.S. Marine Corps).

Stratton attended the Quincy, Massachusetts public school (1937–1948) and Our Lady of Hope Minor Seminary (1949–1951), Newburg, New York. He joined the Missionary Oblates of Mary Immaculate in 1951, completing his novitiate in Ipswich, Massachusetts, in (1952). He studied philosophy at the Oblate College, Washington, D.C. (1952–1954). Leaving the seminary, he graduated from Georgetown University (1955) with a BA degree in History/Government. He earned a Master of Arts degree (International Relations) from Stanford University (1964) as well as a Master of Social Work degree from the Rhode Island College School of Social Work (1988).

He developed an early interest in aviation with initial visits in the mid-1930s to Dennison Airport (Squantum), in Quincy, Massachusetts, the home of the Harvard Aero Club, which hosted Amelia Earhart. During high school, he closely observed the intensive training activities of aircraft based at the Naval Air Station Squantum, (Quincy Massachusetts), observed aircraft carrier launchings at the Fore River Shipyard (Quincy, Massachusetts) and maintained contact with neighbors then serving in the Armed Forces.

== Military career ==
=== Pre-Vietnam ===
During high school Stratton enlisted in the Massachusetts National Guard (1947–1948) [211 Cavalry Reconnaissance Squadron (Mechanized) – First Corps Cadets]. He served as mortar squad leader and was discharged as a private first class to enter the minor seminary.

Upon graduation from college (1955) he enlisted in the Navy as a naval aviation cadet at the U.S. Naval School of Preflight with class 19-55. Upon completing Preflight, he became an ensign, USNR-R. He received his flight training with CNABATRA in the Pensacola Naval complex, making his initial carrier qualification on the USS Saipan (CVL-48) in the North American SNJ-5 on July 27, 1956.

He began his advanced flight training with CNAVANTRA, Corpus Christi, Texas, flying out of Naval Air Station Chase Field, Beeville, Texas, in TV-2, F9F-2 and F9F-8 aircraft. Upon receiving his wings in 1957, he received a regular commission and was kept at ATU-203 as an instructor. In 1958, he received orders to Attack Squadron Ninety-Four (VA-94) home ported at NAS Alameda, California. Flying both the FJ-4 (Fury) and the A4D Skyhawk, he was deployed twice to the Far East on board the USS Ranger (CV-61) attached to Carrier Air Group Nine. His squadron call sign was "Cyrano". From 1962 to 1964 he was assigned to the NROTC Unit Stanford for postgraduate studies in International Relations under Professor James T. Watkins IV. He accomplished his proficiency flying at NAS Moffett Field, Sunnyvale, California, flying TV-2 and SNB aircraft.

=== Vietnam War (1964–1975) ===
==== Pre-deployment ====
In 1964, Stratton was promoted to Lieutenant Commander and assigned as aide and Executive Assistant to the Deputy Director, Joint Strategic Planning Staff, SAC, Offutt AFB, Nebraska. He maintained his aviation qualifications flying USAF T-33 aircraft out of Offutt. Upon completion of that tour of duty in 1966, he was ordered to VA-125, the light attack replacement air group, NAS Lemoore, California, for refresher training in the A4 Skyhawk.

That summer he joined Attack Squadron One Ninety Two (VA-192) as Maintenance Officer and light attack aviator. In October 1966, his call sign was "The Beak". VA-192 joined Carrier Air Wing Nineteen on board the USS Ticonderoga (CV-14) for a deployment in the Gulf of Tonkin and South China Sea. During the squadron's first forty days on the line in combat, he accumulated 21 combat missions.

==== Prisoner of war and "The Stratton Incident" ====
On January 5, 1967, as part of an armed reconnaissance mission over Thanh Hóa Province, Stratton was flying an A-4 Skyhawk. The mission's aim was to bomb the My Trach ferry. When the ferry could not be found, Stratton spotted a set of barges one mile further upriver and rolled in to attack the craft with rockets. Stratton was forced to eject from his plane when he was shot down. He was captured shortly after parachuting to the ground.

In 1967, American journalist Lee Lockwood arranged a trip to North Vietnam, making him the first Western journalist to visit the country in nearly a decade. While there, the North Vietnamese presented Lockwood with a confession read by Stratton, attacking the U.S. military action in the region. Lockwood described Stratton as "looking like a puppet" whose "eyes were empty". The photos that Lockwood took on the trip became the material for "North Vietnam Under Siege", an article that appeared in the April 7, 1967, edition of Life magazine, which included a widely distributed picture of Stratton in prison garb bowing deeply as ordered by a North Vietnamese officer. Robert J. McCloskey of the U.S. Department of State cited Lockwood's material about Stratton as evidence that North Vietnam was brainwashing prisoners for propaganda.

In the Department of Defense history of the Vietnam POW situation, "The Long Road Home", the author, Vernon Davis, in a section labeled "The Stratton Incident" recounts the worldwide revulsion engendered by the incident and the eventual decision of the USG to go public with POW mistreatment. A 1978 book by Scott Blakely, Prisoner at War: The Survival of Commander Richard A Stratton, explores the bowing incident and its complicated history.

Stratton used the Lockwood press conference to perform in such a way that it would raise doubt and confusion regarding the so-called confession to the discredit of his captors. His nom de guerre, while attached to the 4th Allied POW Wing in Hanoi, changed frequently to confuse his captors: "Dick"; "Penis", "Wiz" (Wizard). He served under the direction of Cdr. James Stockdale (MOH), the Senior Officer Present - Navy. A full account of Stratton's prison experience is contained in Scott Blakey's biography. "Prisoner at War" and his oral history, U.S. Naval Institute.

==== Operation Homecoming ====
Stratton was released on March 4, 1973, at Hanoi's Gia Lam Airport as part of the 2nd DRV Increment, Operation Homecoming, comprising 108 POWs on three flights. He had been a prisoner for 2,251 days. While a prisoner, he had been promoted to the rank of commander. After being processed at the Clark Air Base Hospital, the Philippines, he arrived back in the United States on March 8, 1973. He was awarded the Silver Star, the Legion of Merit with V, the Bronze Star Medal with V, the Navy Commendation Medal with V, the Purple Heart, and the Prisoner of War Medal for service as a prisoner of war.

Completing convalescent leave, he refreshed in the A-4 at NAS Lemoore, California, and then reported for duty as Executive Officer, Naval Plant Representative Office, (Strategic Systems Project Office), Lockheed Missiles and Space Company, Sunnyvale, California. He was selected for captain during this assignment.

=== Post Vietnam War ===
In 1976, Stratton was assigned as Commanding Officer of Naval Recruiting District, with responsibility for forty-four Navy recruiting sites in New York. Stratton, his wife, Alice, and their three sons moved into a new home in Garden City, New York. From 1977 to 1979 he was Commander, Recruiting Area Five, Naval Station Great Lakes, North Chicago, Illinois. From 1979 to 1981 he was Deputy for Operations, U.S. Naval Academy, Annapolis, Maryland. His final active duty assignment was as Director, Naval Academy Preparatory School, Naval Education and Training Center Newport, Rhode Island, from 1981 to 1986.

== Post-retirement ==
Upon his retirement in 1986, Stratton studied at the Rhode Island School of Social Work in pursuit of a career as a clinical social worker. He graduated in 1988, became licensed to practice in Rhode Island and specialized in children and families, addictions and PTSD. He qualified as a member of the Academy of Certified Social Workers and a national certified addiction counselor, Level I. Moving to Florida in 1993, he became licensed to practice in Florida and worked as a contract counselor retiring in 2001 after four years counseling sailors and their families at Naval Submarine Base Kings Bay, Georgia, and Naval Station Mayport, Florida.

== Personal life and death ==
Stratton and Alice Marie Robertson were married at the NAS Alameda, California chapel on April 4, 1959. Alice was a career clinical social worker and was the first Deputy Assistant Secretary of the Navy for Personnel and Families (1985–1989). They had three sons; Patrick, Michael, and Charlie.

Stratton died on January 18, 2025, at the age of 93.
