= North Quincy, Massachusetts =

Neighborhood of Quincy, Massachusetts

Coordinates: 42°16′37″N 71°01′13″W

North Quincy is a neighborhood of Quincy, Massachusetts. It is separated from the city of Boston by the Neponset River, and borders the Quincy neighborhoods of Squantum, Montclair and Wollaston. It contains the smaller neighborhoods of Atlantic (sometimes used as a metonym for North Quincy) and Norfolk Downs, as well as much of Wollaston Beach.

== History ==
Originally referred to as Billings Plain, the area - once largely marshland and part of the Neponset River drainage - was utilized as training and parade grounds by local militia. It was subsequently home to a race track operated by the Jockey Club of Boston in the 19th century.

Starting in the late 1970s, North Quincy has seen a large influx of Chinese American and Eastern Asian immigrants and is predominantly Asian today.

The neighborhood was once home to a large Navy population, housed in a large development north of Quincy Shore Drive and intended to serve the Squantum naval air base. After NAS Squantum closed, the site continued to house Navy personnel and their families based at the South Weymouth NAS until that base's closure in 1997; it has since been converted to senior housing.

The major employers in the neighborhood are Blue Cross Blue Shield of Massachusetts and State Street Corporation, which have their operations centers on Newport Avenue adjacent to the rapid transit station.

== Transportation ==
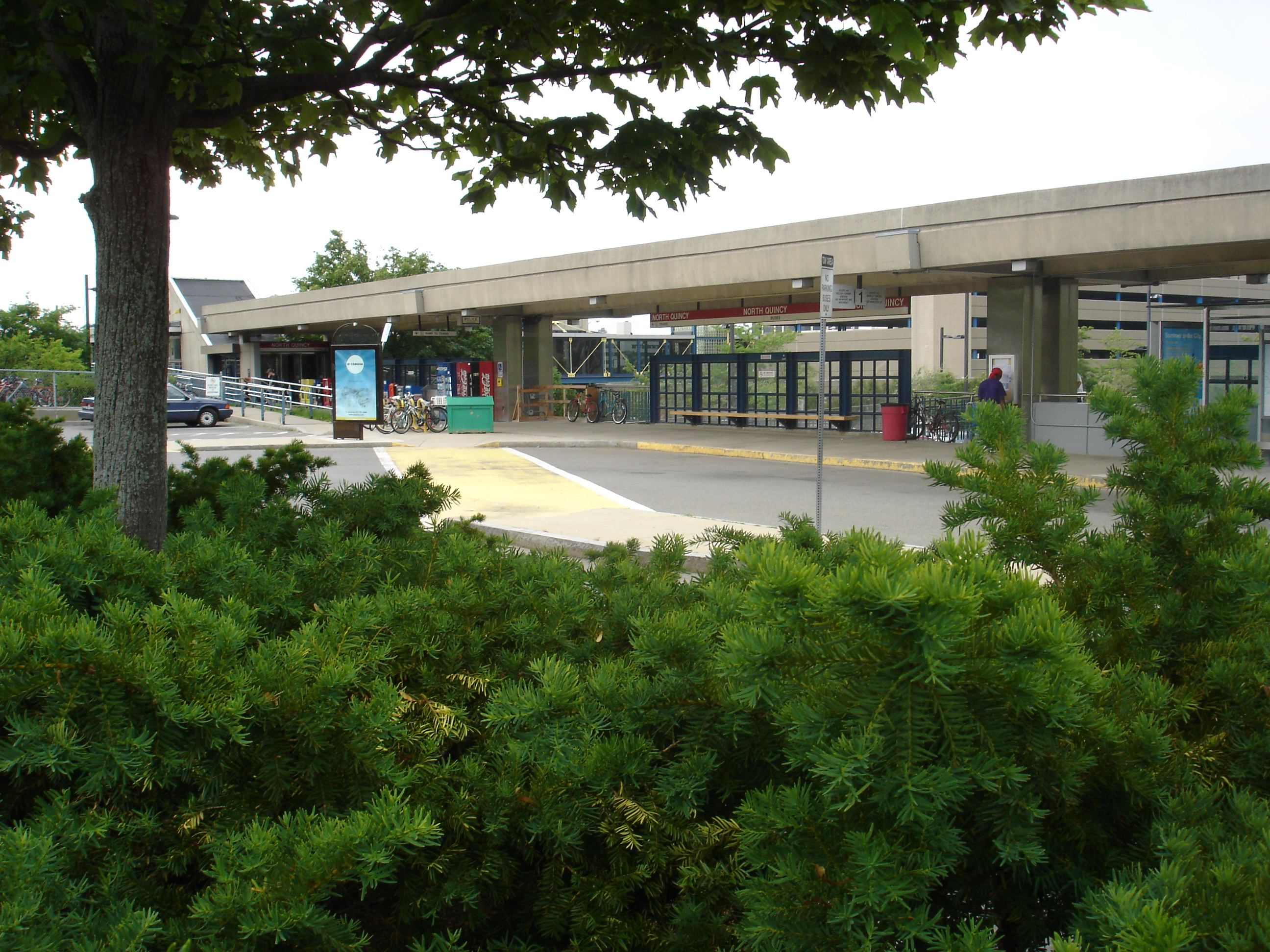
North Quincy MBTA station

Starting in 1845, the Old Colony Railroad began servicing the area. The New York, New Haven and Hartford Railroad leased the system - which extended through the South Shore, Norfolk and Plymouth Counties - starting in 1893. The neighborhood had two Old Colony stations; the Norfolk Downs station, situated at the end of Billings Road, and Atlantic Station, at the end of Atlantic Street. The Eastern Massachusetts Street Railway ran streetcar routes from Neponset Station in Boston along Hancock Street to Quincy Center and points south through the 1930s; a branch route went from Atlantic Station to Squantum.

The North Quincy station of the MBTA's Red Line, situated across from North Quincy High School on Hancock and West Squantum Streets, opened in 1971. Several MBTA bus routes also serve the neighborhood; the 211 Squantum-Montclair route passes through North Quincy Station down East Squantum Street to Squantum, the 210 Quincy Center-Fields Corner route travels down Hancock Street and the 212 North Quincy-Quincy Center route travels down Billings Road.

State Route 3A traverses the length of Hancock Street, crossing the Neponset River Bridge into Boston.

== Education ==
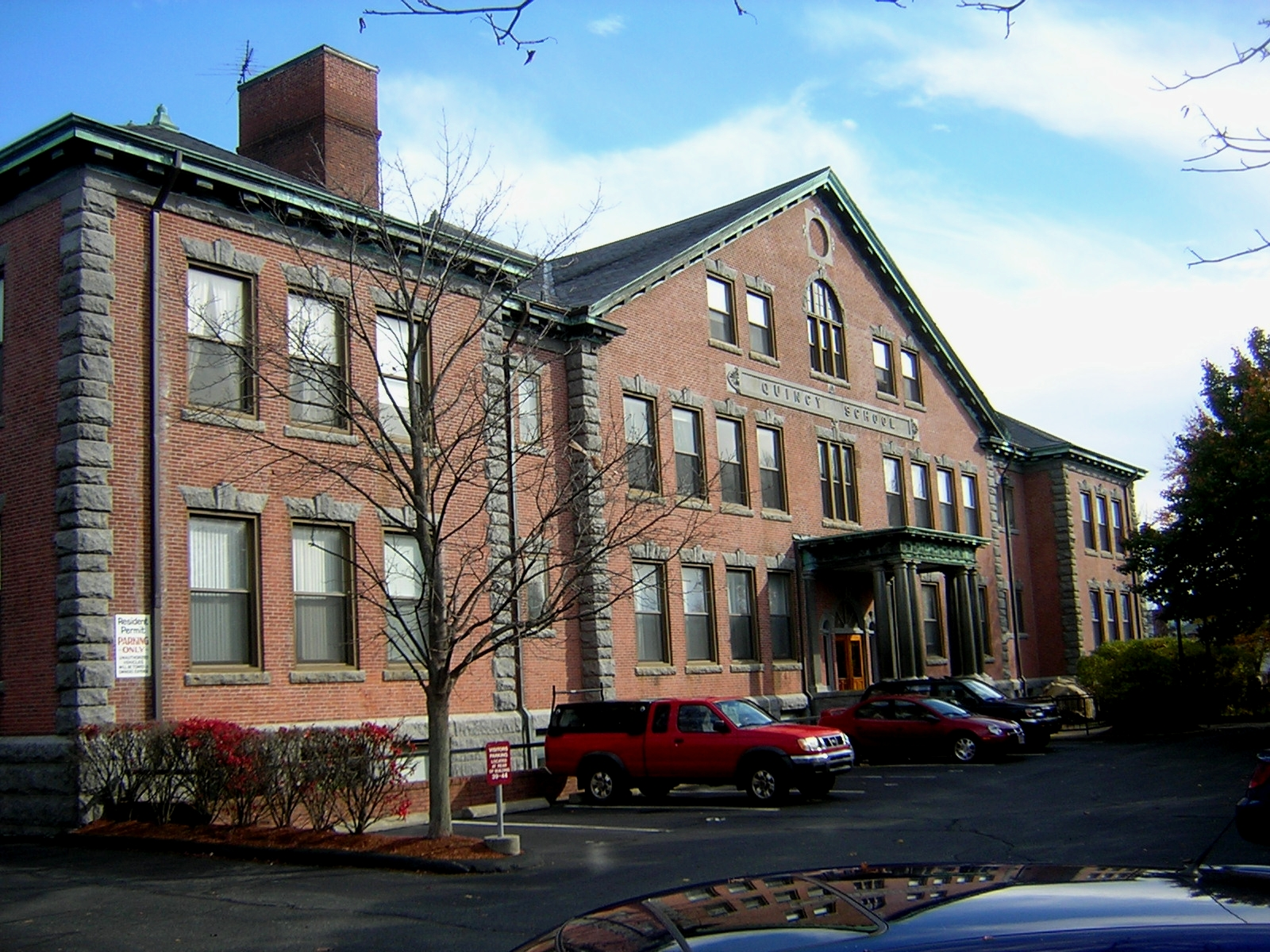
Quincy Elementary School

The public schools serving North Quincy are F. W. Parker Elementary School and Atlantic Middle School. A second elementary school, Quincy Elementary School on Newbury Avenue, was closed in 1981 following the passage of Proposition 2½ and converted to condominiums; the building was placed on the National Register of Historic Places in 1983.

North Quincy High School, between Hancock and Hunt Streets, is the high school of North Quincy and the surrounding neighborhoods. It underwent extensive renovation in 1970-72, expanding significantly and requiring the razing of Oliver Street. Further expansion involved razing many homes on Hunt Street to build parking lots and access to athletic fields. A since-closed annex was also built on Newbury Avenue.

After its main building was repossessed by the city for construction purposes, Quincy College moved most of its facilities to Newport Avenue near the subway station. These have since closed, and the college consolidated downtown.

A branch of the Thomas Crane Public Library is located on Hancock Street in Norfolk Downs near the MBTA station; a second neighborhood branch on Atlantic Street was also a casualty of Proposition 2½ and closed in 1980.
