= Squantum =

Neighborhood of Quincy, Massachusetts

Coordinates: 42.296°N 71.012°W

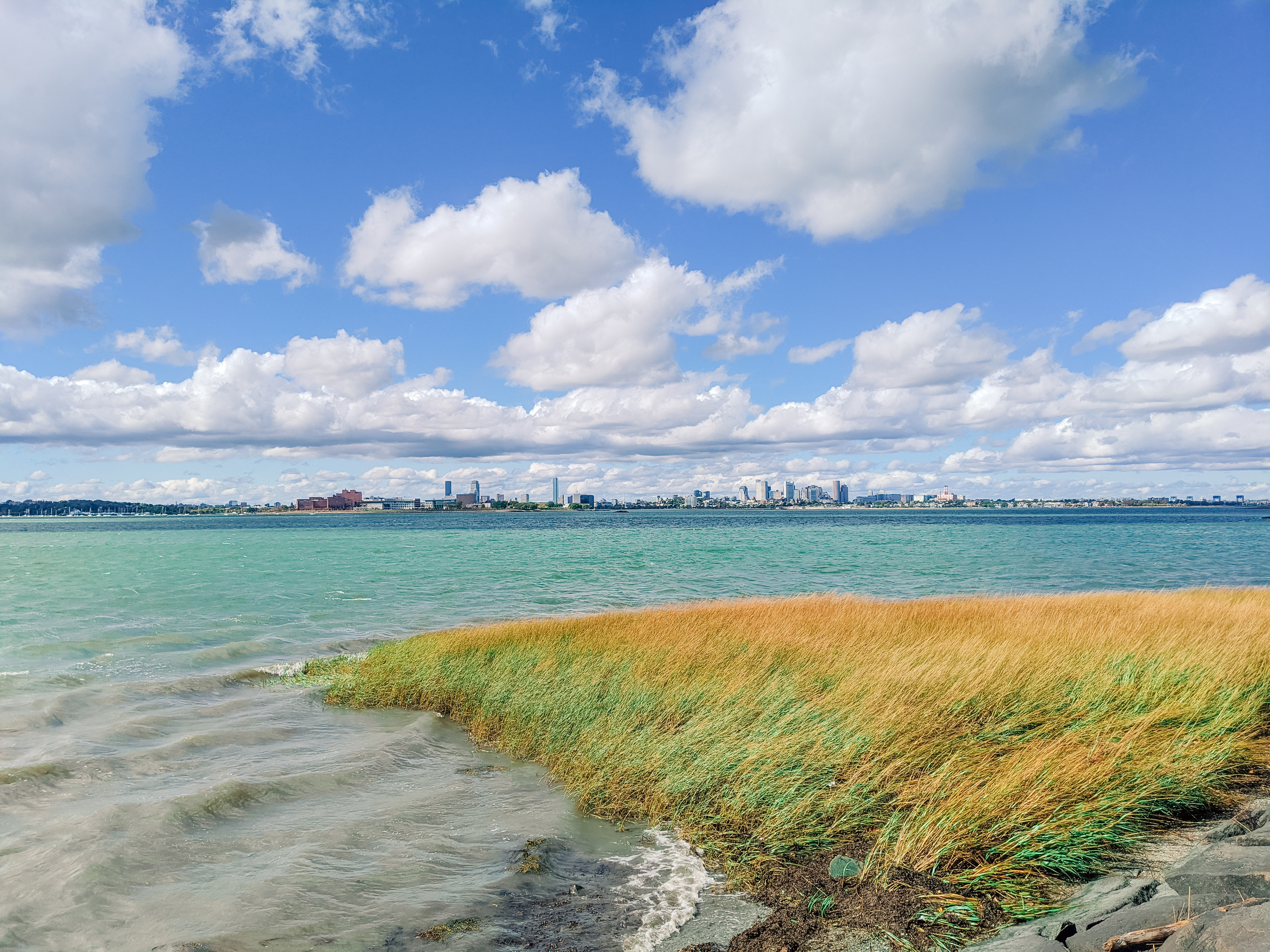
Squantum offers scenic views of the Boston skyline.

Squantum is a neighborhood of Quincy, Massachusetts, connected to the mainland by a causeway that crosses over a wetland area of the bay. Often thought of as a peninsula, Squantum proper is technically a barrier island as it is surrounded on all four sides by water and is only connected to the mainland and Moon Island via causeways. Located in the northernmost portion of the city, Squantum is bordered on the north by Dorchester Bay and Boston Harbor, on the east by Moon Island and Quincy Bay, on the south by Quincy Bay and North Quincy, and on the west by the Marina Bay development. The population of the neighborhood in 2010 according to the United States Census Bureau was 2,365. Squantum has scenic, waterfront views of Boston Harbor and the Boston skyline and has many of Quincy’s most expensive homes. Squantum residents are the wealthiest of any neighborhood in Quincy, according to the 2010 United States Census Bureau, and the home ownership rate is approximately 92%. The neighborhood is further characterized by its tree-lined streets, its "island getaway" feel, close-knit community, and its annual Squantum Fourth of July Parade. As described in a 2020 book, "One road leads in and out of a square mile of land that is a playground for children and a haven for adults." Squantum also has one of the largest Irish populations, on a per capita basis, of any neighborhood in the United States.

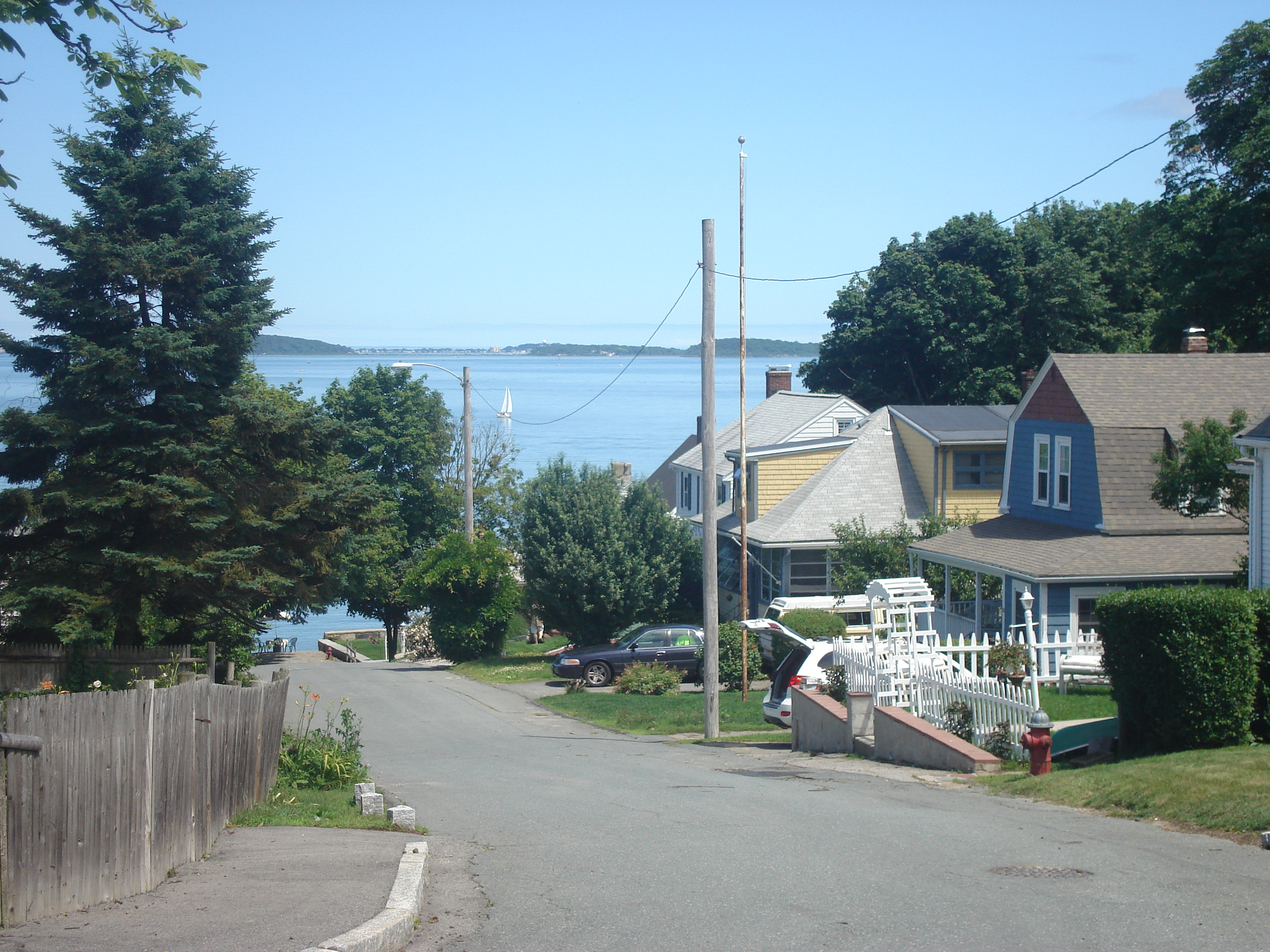
Looking east over Quincy Bay down a neighborhood street in Squantum, Quincy, Massachusetts

The neighborhood includes two public beaches (Nickerson Beach and Orchard Beach), as well as state-owned Squantum Point Park, which has hiking trails and points for canoeing or kayaking. It is also home to Squantum Elementary School and the First Church of Squantum.

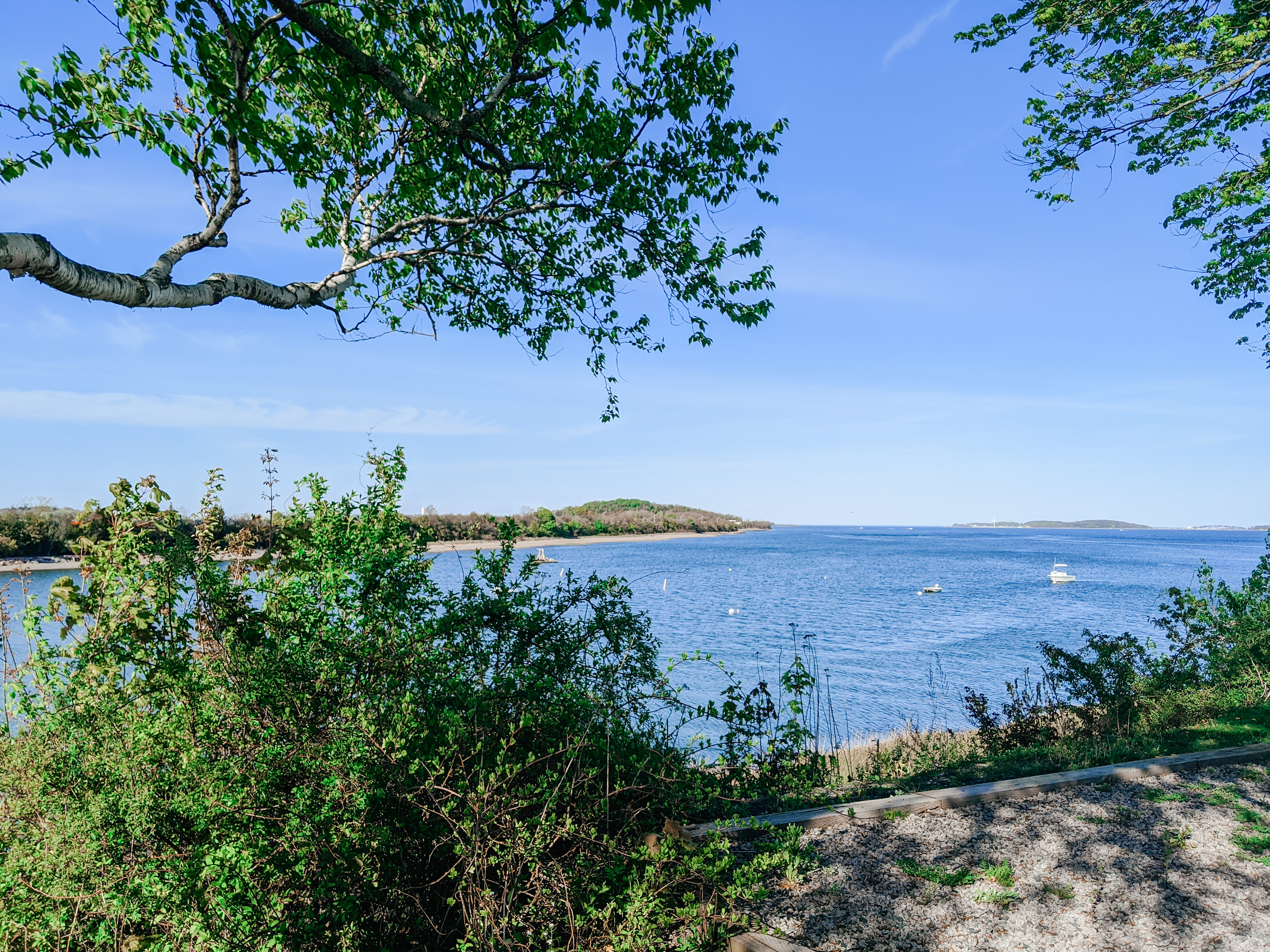
Squantum in May 2020. View from Bayside Rd., overlooking the Boston Harbor

== History ==
Before the arrival of English colonists in the seventeenth century, Squantum was populated by Native Americans who valued it as a fertile mollusk harvesting site. Moswetuset Hummock, a hill located at the head of the present day causeway leading to the neighborhood, is by one account the origin of the name of the Massachusett tribe of indigenous people for whom the state of Massachusetts is named. In 1621 the tribe's chief, Chickatawbut, was visited there by Plymouth Colony commander Myles Standish and Squanto, a native guide from whom the peninsula and neighborhood take their names. In the early years following colonization Squantum was part of Dorchester before joining Quincy when it was incorporated as a town separate from Braintree in 1792.

By the middle of the eighteenth century Squantum had become a resort destination and was eventually connected to the area's trolley system. By the end of World War I, the neighborhood had formed as a year round residence. Also around this time Squantum had been part of early aviation history as an airshow put on by Harvard University's Aeronautical Society was held on the peninsula in 1910. On July 1, 1912, during the 3rd annual Boston aviation meet held in Squantum, Harriet Quimby, the first woman pilot in the United States died while piloting an aircraft. In 1927, Dennison Airport opened at the lower end of Squantum Peninsula with Amelia Earhart as a chief employee and pilot. The Naval Air Station Squantum also began operations on the peninsula in the 1920s as a naval reserve training base. The base was used until closing in 1954 and eventually was developed into the neighboring Marina Bay section of Quincy in the 1980s, with some opposition from Squantum residents who feared traffic congestion, noise pollution, and environmental damage from filling wetlands. Today Marina Bay includes a variety of restaurants, other businesses, and housing, as well as a popular boardwalk.

== Notable residents ==
- Lotta Crabtree
- Bill Chase
- Harriet Quimby (Died in Squantum)
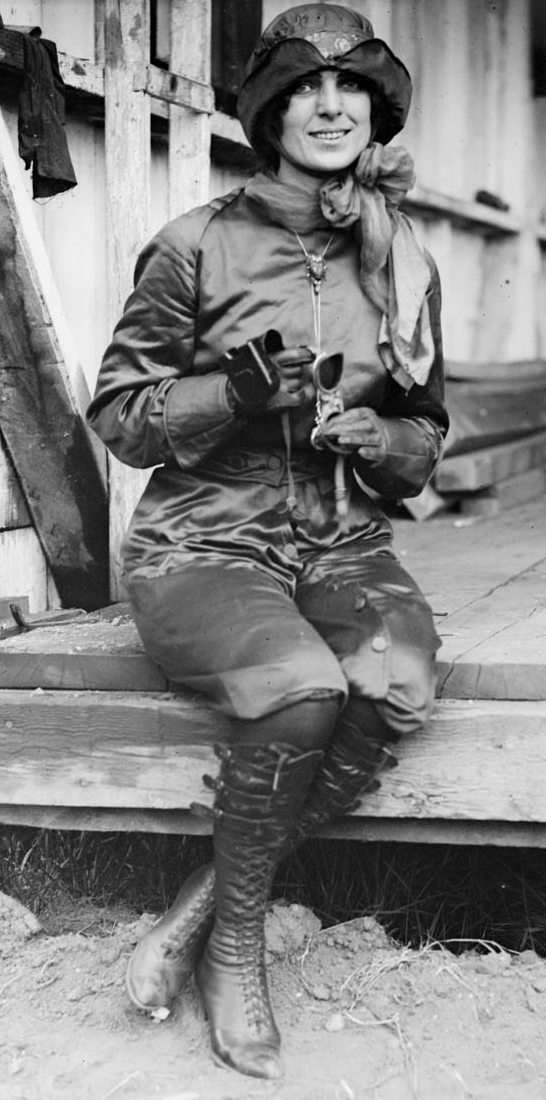
  Harriet Quimby in 1911
- Michael W. Morrissey, District Attorney of Norfolk County, Massachusetts (2010–present)

== Transportation ==
East Squantum Street becomes a causeway bordered by the Squantum Marshes and Boston Harbor as it enters the neighborhood from North Quincy and Quincy Shore Drive, heading northeast before turning south into the neighborhood at Dorchester Street; it is the only land access onto the peninsula. Dorchester Street continues northeast to the Moon Island Road causeway to Moon Island, controlled by the city of Boston and not available for general public access. Squantum is served by bus route 211 of the Massachusetts Bay Transportation Authority (MBTA) with connections to the regional subway at North Quincy station on the MBTA Red Line.

=== Historic ship ===
The 1846 ship Squantum, 646 tons, was built by J.T. Foster in Medford, MA, and owned by Thomas B. Wales & Co. of Boston. She was wrecked at Coorla Burla, India with three lives lost, on June 14, 1860, en route from Boston to Bombay.
