= Marina Bay (Quincy, Massachusetts) =

Neighborhood in Quincy, Massachusetts, United States

Coordinates: 42.2979°N 71.0287°W

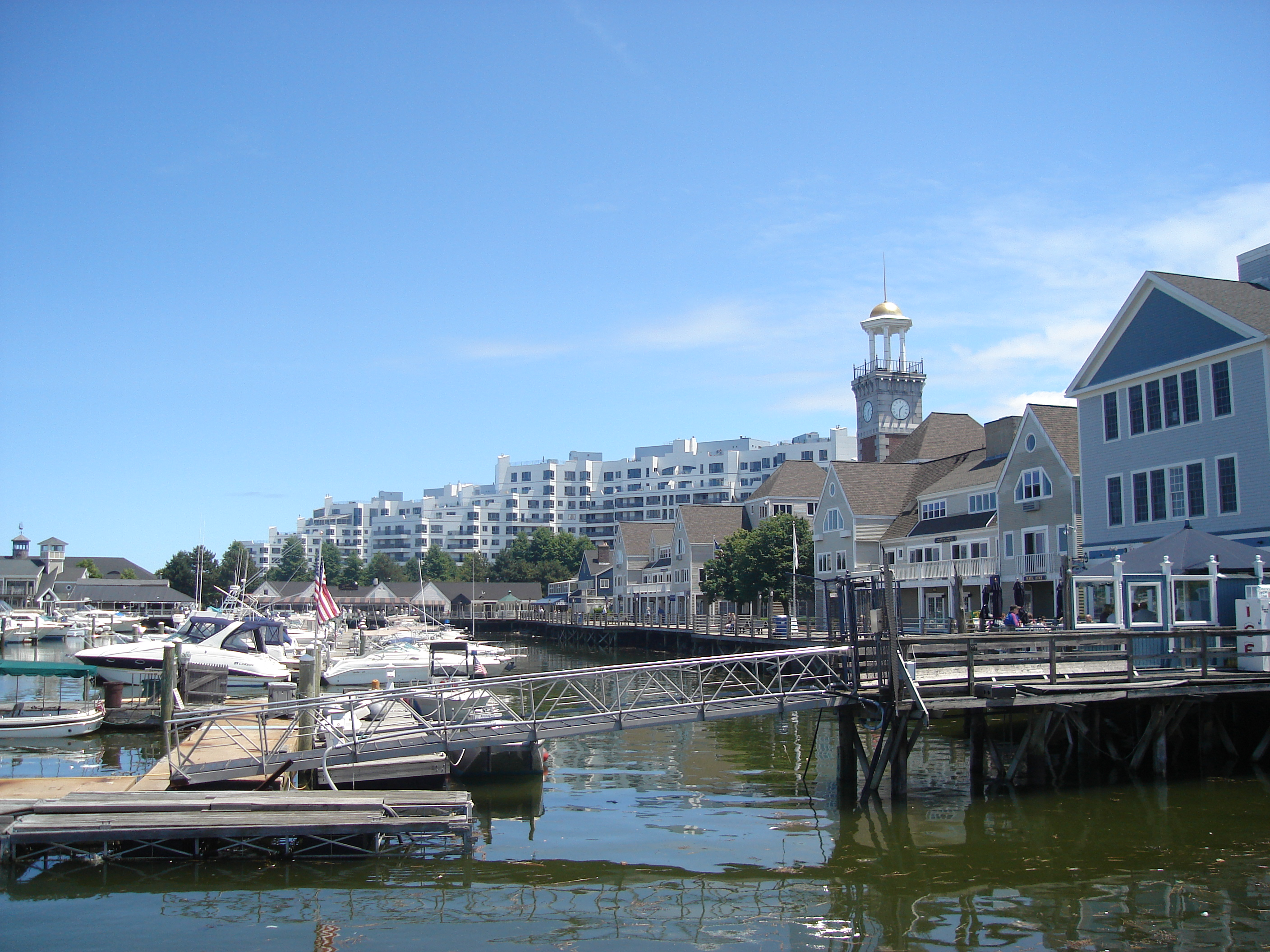
Looking east-southeast toward the boardwalk, clock tower and shops at Marina Bay in Quincy, Massachusetts, with the Marina Point condominiums in the background.

Marina Bay is a mixed-use development neighborhood of condominium, commercial and entertainment facilities in Quincy, Massachusetts. It includes five housing complexes (including detached, townhouse and low-rise apartment units) and one assisted living complex, office complexes, numerous restaurants, a craft brewery and taproom, a 685-slip marina and a seaside boardwalk. It is situated on the northwestern part of Squantum Peninsula at the mouth of the Neponset River where it meets Dorchester Bay in Boston Harbor. The permanent residential population of Marina Bay in 2000 was about 1,300 according to the United States Census Bureau; however, the Boston Globe reported in 2004 that the complex had 2,000 residents.

== History ==
Marina Bay is situated on the former site of the Victory Destroyer Plant and Naval Air Station Squantum, a naval airfield that was closed in 1954. The surplus base was sold at auction in 1956 by the U.S. Government's General Services Administration to the Boston Edison company, the major electric utility in eastern Massachusetts at the time. Although other uses were discussed, it was generally assumed that Boston Edison would use the 600-acre (2.4 km^{2}) site to build an electricity generation facility, with the construction of a nuclear power plant included in the speculation. The company did not act to develop a plant and instead leased the property to a company that maintained a large marina on the site in the 1960s, using the main hangar of the old naval air base as the main marina building.

Boston Harbor Marina Inc., later Marina Industries Inc., became interested in development of the land as a mixed-used complex in the 1980s and a group driven by Quincy developers William and Peter O'Connell was able to gain support and finally approval from the city of Quincy for the project in 1985. Construction proceeded in phases for several years until the recession of the early 1990s brought it to a halt and eventually forced the O'Connells to declare bankruptcy. Development continued under other management with the involvement of the O'Connells after foreclosure. During the 1990s and beyond it became recognized as a highly desirable location by companies and urban professionals and has been cited by the state of Massachusetts as a successful example of "traditional neighborhood development", an aspect of what has come to be known as New Urbanism.

The development has not existed without controversy. The initial concept and construction was opposed unsuccessfully by residents of the adjacent Squantum neighborhood of Quincy who feared traffic congestion and noise pollution. Later, environmental groups successfully opposed expansion of the complex into an area of wetlands used as a bird sanctuary, fighting a five-year battle that ended in 2002. Noise from a large nightclub known as Ocean Club, formerly Marina Bay Beach Club, formerly WaterWorks, has prompted complaints from as far away as the Boston neighborhood of Savin Hill, located 2,000 feet (610 m) across Dorchester Bay, and has been an ongoing source of political struggles.

== Neighborhood identity ==
Marina Bay is not a city by itself, and unlike all other neighborhoods of Quincy it is not yet listed in the United States Geological Survey database of named places in the United States. However, in 2004 it gained temporary notoriety as such when New England Patriots linebacker Willie McGinest was interviewed at home on a nationally televised NFL playoffs broadcast and the location for the live pictures was given at the bottom of the screen as "Marina Bay, Massachusetts". This designation is not officially recognized by the United States Postal Service, which only accepts presorted mail destined for the 02171 ZIP code that is addressed to either Quincy, North Quincy or Squantum, MA. Nevertheless, Marina Bay residents and the local media took note of the broadcast and a story in the Boston Globe outlining the success of the complex and its popularity among athletes and local celebrities appeared shortly after the McGinest interview.
