= Lee Lockwood =

American photographer

Lee Jonathan Lockwood (May 4, 1932 – July 31, 2010) was an American photojournalist best known for his coverage of Communist leaders behind the Iron Curtain during the Cold War era. He interviewed Cuban leader Fidel Castro and spent nearly a month in North Vietnam during the Vietnam War. He also served from 1963 to 1966 as the editor of the journal Contemporary Photographer. During that period he was a member of the Association of Heliographers, and exhibited at the gallery on Madison Avenue.

== Biography ==
Lockwood was born on May 4, 1932, in New York City and became interested in photography as a child. He earned an undergraduate degree in 1954 from Boston University with a major in comparative literature and later attended Columbia University. He served in the United States Army during the 1950s, where he was stationed in Germany. After leaving military service, he traveled widely around the world, with his photographs being distributed by the Black Star photo agency.

== Interview with Castro ==
During a trip to Cuba in 1965, Lockwood was able to arrange a lengthy interview with leader Fidel Castro, during which they discussed topics ranging from the Cuban Missile Crisis to racial issues in the United States. Lockwood's book, Castro’s Cuba, Cuba's Fidel: An American Journalist's Inside Look at Today's Cuba in Text and Picture, published by Macmillan Publishers, was intended to give American readers a clearer picture of the Cuban leader, saying, "If he is really our enemy, as dangerous to us as we are told he is, then we ought to know as much about him as possible".

== Visit to North Vietnam ==
Having obtained a visa while in Cuba, Lockwood arranged a trip to North Vietnam in 1967, making him the first Western journalist to visit the country in nearly a decade. He traveled around the country during his month-long visit, covering 1,000 miles under the strict supervision of government minders who ensured that he didn't photograph any of the nation's military facilities.

While there, the North Vietnamese presented a confession read by Lt. Cmdr. Richard A. Stratton, a United States Navy pilot who had been shot down months earlier. Stratton, who was described by Lockwood as "looking like a puppet" whose "eyes were empty", read a prepared text in which he attacked U.S. military action in the region. The photos that Lockwood took on the trip became the material for "North Vietnam Under Siege", an article that appeared in the April 7, 1967, edition of Life magazine, including a widely distributed picture of Stratton in prison garb bowing deeply as ordered by a North Vietnamese officer, as well as an array of pictures of the countryside and the effects of American bombing missions. Robert J. McCloskey of the U.S. Department of State cited Lockwood's material about Stratton as evidence that North Vietnam was brainwashing prisoners for propaganda purposes.

Other books written by Lockwood include Conversation With Eldridge Cleaver: Algiers (McGraw-Hill, 1970), a biographical portrait of radical intellectual and author Eldridge Cleaver, and Daniel Berrigan: Absurd Convictions, Modest Hopes — Conversations After Prison With Lee Lockwood (Random House, 1972), The Holy Outlaw, a documentary of Daniel Berrigan, a peace activist and Catholic priest who had been one of the FBI's most wanted fugitives.

A resident of Weston, Florida, Lockwood died at age 78 in Tamarac, Florida on July 31, 2010, due to complications of diabetes. He was survived by his wife, the former Joyce Greenfield, as well as by a daughter, a son and six grandchildren.
