= Torokina Airfield =

Former World War II airfield on Bougainville Island, Papua New Guinea

Torokina Airfield Cape Torokina Airfield
- Bougainville
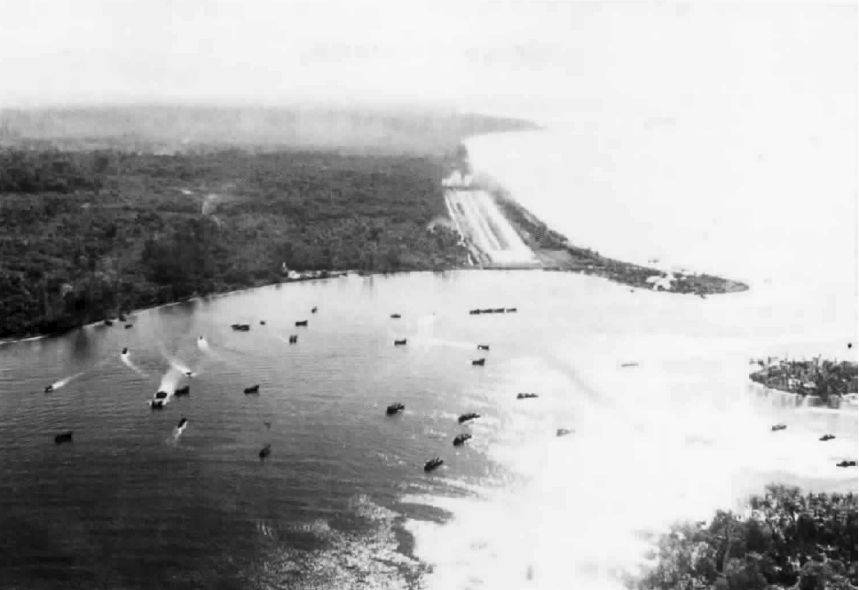
- Aerial view of Torokina Airfield in December 1943

Site information
- Type: Military airfield
- Controlled by: United States Marine Corps
- Condition: Abandoned

Location
- Coordinates: 06°14.8302′S 155°02.9256′E

Site history
- Built: 1943
- In use: 1943-5
- Materials: Marsden Matting over sand
- Battles/wars: Bougainville Campaign

Torokina Airfield, also known as Cape Torokina Airfield, is a former World War II airfield located at Cape Torokina, Bougainville.

== History ==
=== World War II ===
The 3rd Marine Division landed on Bougainville on 1 November 1943 at the start of the Bougainville Campaign, establishing a beachhead around Cape Torokina. Small detachments of the 25th, 53rd, 71st and 75th Naval Construction Battalions landed with the Marines and the 71st Battalion was tasked with establishing a 5,150 feet (1,570 m) by 200 feet (61 m) fighter airfield that would become Torokina Airfield. The airfield became operational on December 10, 1943, when VMF-216 landed with 18 F4U Corsairs.

On 9 March 1944, the Japanese shelled the airfield and forced the squadrons that were based there to take off to avoid damage to their aircraft. Royal New Zealand Air Force squadrons also began operating from the airfield from January 1, 1944. Units assigned to the airfield included:

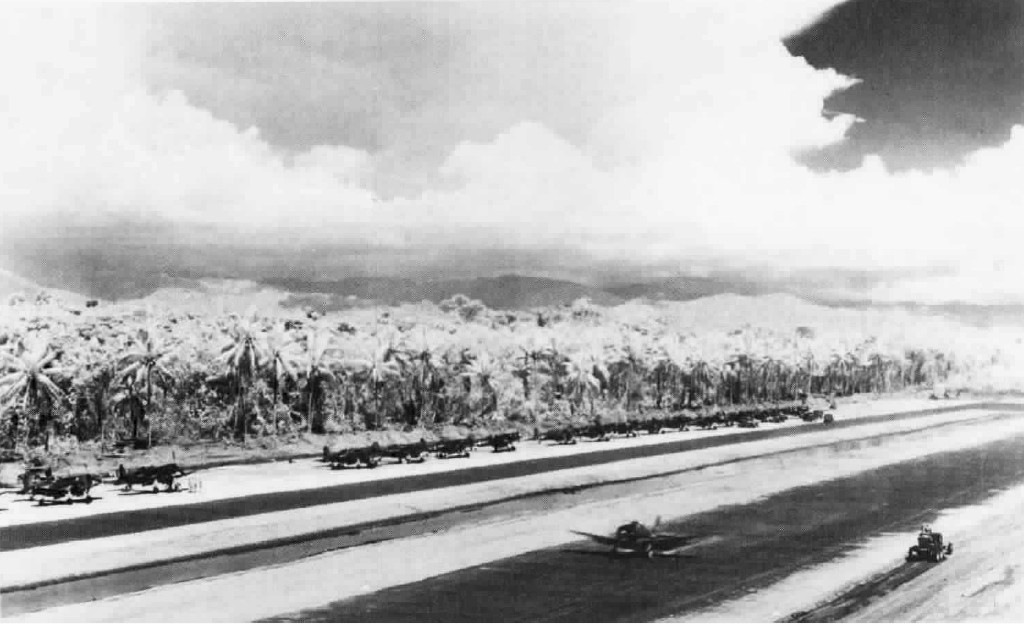
SBDs and F4Us at Torokina, December 1943

- United States Navy

VC-40 operating Grumman TBF Avengers
ACORN 13
VF(N)-75 operating Vought F4U Corsairs

- VF-17 with Corsair
- United States Marine Corps

VMTB-233 operating TBF Avengers
VMF-211 operating F4U Corsairs
VMF-212 operating F4U Corsairs
VMF-215 operating F4U Corsairs
VMF-216 operating F4U Corsairs
VMF(N)-531 operating Lockheed PV-1 Ventura night-fighters

- Royal New Zealand Air Force

No. 19 Squadron operating F4U Corsairs

=== Postwar ===
Today the airfield is no longer used and most of the runway is overgrown with vegetation.

== See also ==
- Piva Airfield
- United States Army Air Forces in the South Pacific Area
