= Cape Torokina =

Coordinates: 06°14′51″S 155°02′24″E

Cape Torokina is a promontory at the north end of Empress Augusta Bay, along the central part of the western coast of Bougainville, in Papua New Guinea.

This cape formed the southern end of the landing zone where the United States I Marine Amphibious Corps performed an amphibious invasion on November 1, 1943 during Operation Cherry Blossom. The small Puruata Island is just off the coast to the west of Cape Torokina. The cape and island form a beach to the north which is subject to heavy surf.

The cape was relatively isolated, with a poor trail system to supply the area. A wide swamp stretched inland from the beach area, and the island was heavily forested. During the landing, the cape was the site of a Japanese 75 mm gun that inflicted heavy damage upon the landing craft.

Following the landing, an airfield was constructed at the cape. Twenty-five miles of roads were also built around the area.

== See also ==
- Battle of Bougainville
- Battle of Empress Augusta Bay
- Torokina Airfield
