= VMA-322 =

Marine Attack Squadron 322
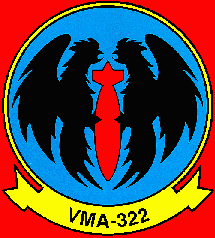
- VMA-322 Insignia
- Active: 1 July 1943 — 30 November 1949; 6 July 1951 — 27 June 1992
- Country: United States
- Allegiance: United States of America
- Branch: United States Marine Corps
- Type: Attack squadron
- Role: Close Air Support
- Part of: Inactive
- Nickname(s): Fighting Gamecocks; Cannon Balls
- Tail Code: QR
- Engagements: World War II * Battle of Okinawa

Marine Attack Squadron 322 (VMA-322) was an attack squadron in the United States Marine Corps. The squadron, also known as the "Fighting Gamecocks", fought in World War II and later became a part of the Marine Forces Reserve based out of Naval Air Station South Weymouth, Massachusetts.

== History ==
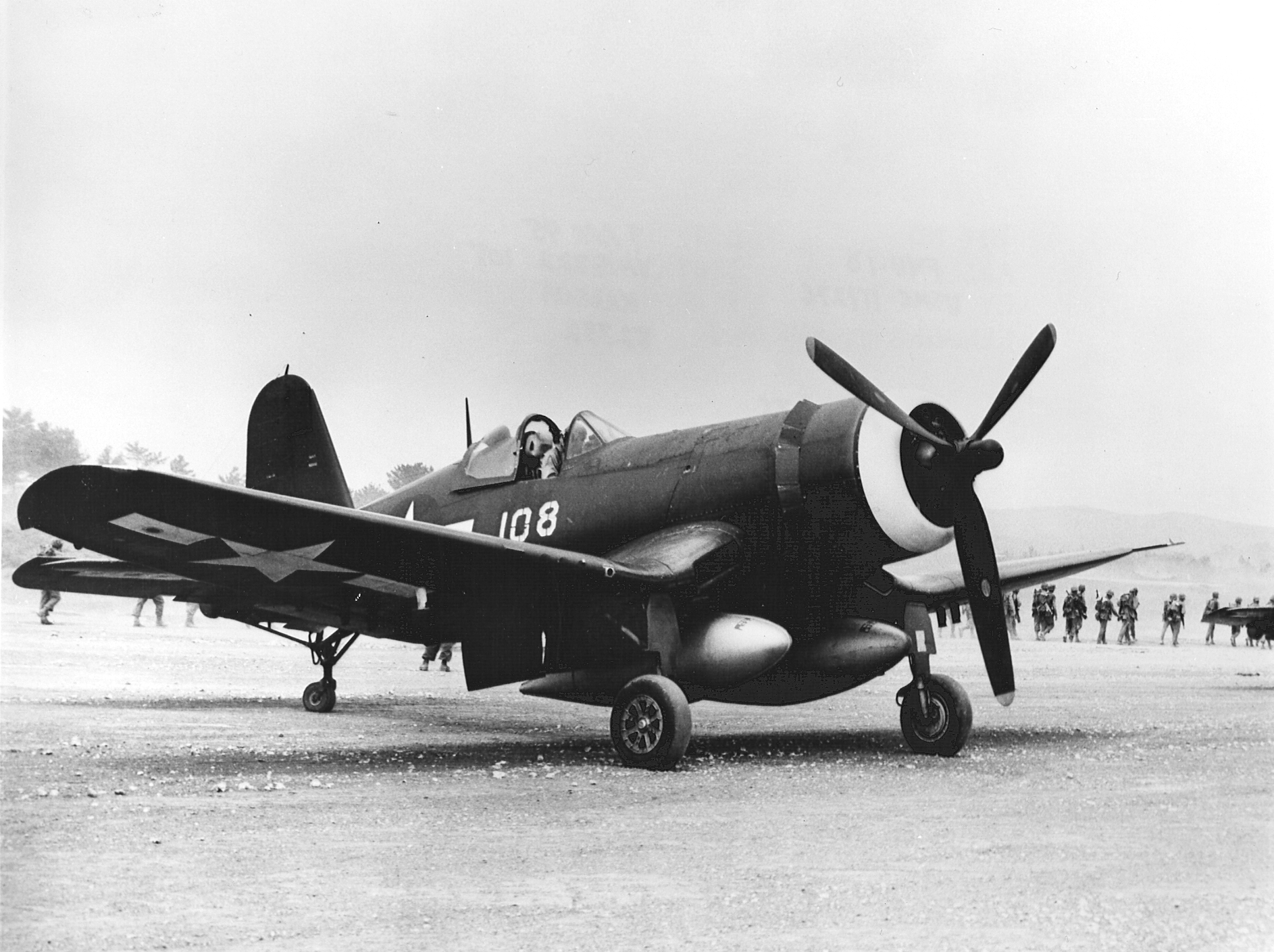
A VMF-322 F4U-1D on Okinawa, 1945

Marine Fighting Squadron 322 (VMF-322) was established on 1 July 1943, at Marine Corps Air Station Cherry Point flying the F4U Corsair. In the fall of that year they moved to Marine Corps Recruit Depot Parris Island, South Carolina to continue their training. They moved again in January, 1944 to Marine Corps Air Station Ewa, Hawaii.

In October, 1944, the squadron became part of Marine Aircraft Group 33 (MAG-33) when they moved to Espiritu Santo. The squadron was part of the Battle of Okinawa and on 3 April 1945, over 150 of its members were killed when its lead support element was struck by a Kamikaze. They rebounded quickly and were able to fly their first combat mission on 9 April 1945. VMF-322 remained on Okinawa for the rest of the war as they made bombing runs over the Japanese mainland. Following the war, the squadron moved to Midway Island in November 1945 where they remained as part of Marine Aircraft Group 44 (MAG-44) until they were deactivated on 30 November 1949.

== Cold War ==
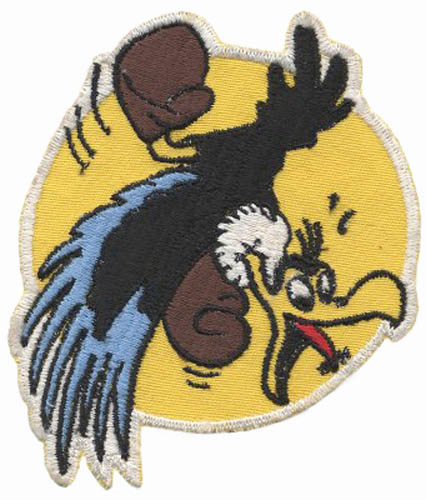
Squadron insignia for the Cannon Balls of VMF-322

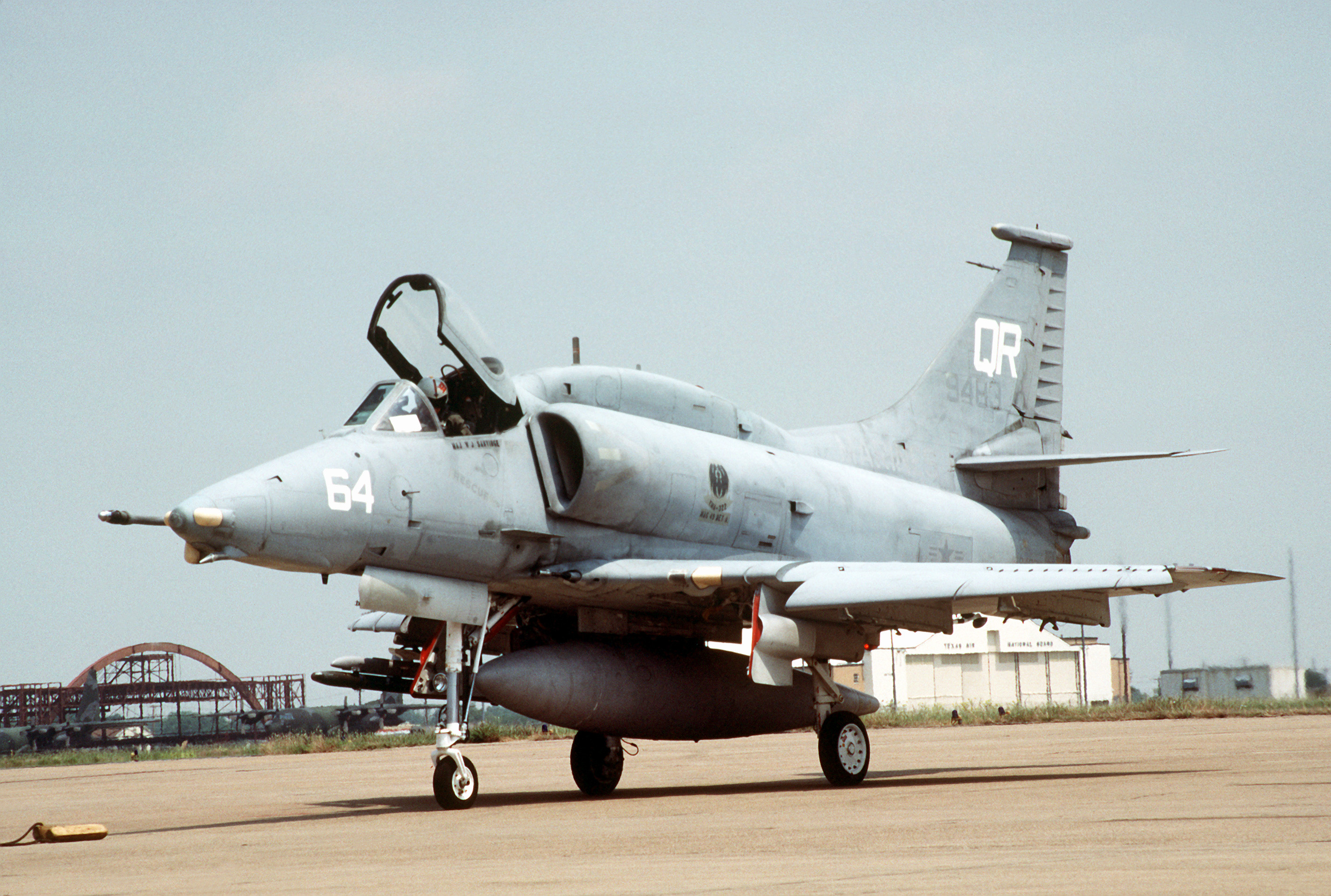
An A-4M of VMA-322 on the tarmac in 1988

VMF-322 was reactivated during the Korean War on 6 July 1951, again flying the F4U Corsair. The squadron moved to Naval Air Station South Weymouth in January 1954 and transitioned to the F9F Cougar in March 1955. The squadron was re-designated as Marine Attack Squadron 322 (VMA-322) in May 1958 and changed aircraft again, this time to the FJ3 Fury in November 1959. In September 1962 the squadron received its final aircraft in the venerable A-4 Skyhawk. In 1964, VMA-322 absorbed the aircraft and personnel of VMA-217 after their deactivation.

VMA-322 was decommissioned on 27 June 1992, as part of the post-Cold War drawdown of the United States Military

== See also ==
- United States Marine Corps Aviation
- List of active United States Marine Corps aircraft squadrons
- List of decommissioned United States Marine Corps aircraft squadrons
