= VMR-216 =

Marine Transport Squadron 216
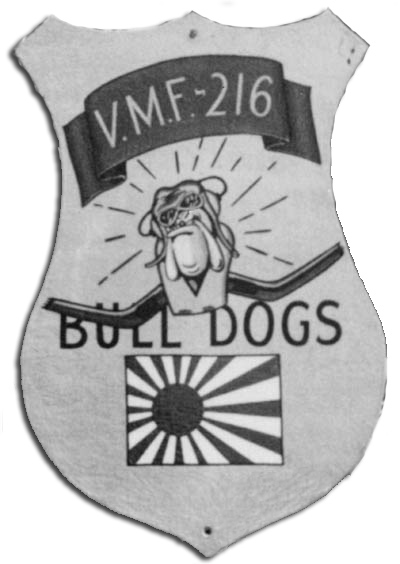
- VMF-216 insignia
- Active: 16 Sep 1943 – 10 Mar 1946; 1 Jul 1946 - 21 Dec 1972
- Country: United States
- Allegiance: United States of America
- Branch: United States Marine Corps
- Type: Utility/Transport
- Role: Assault Support
- Part of: Inactive
- Nickname(s): Bulldogs
- Engagements: World War II * Battle of Guam * Battle of Iwo Jima

Aircraft flown
- Fighter: F4F Wildcat; F4U Corsair; Grumman F6F Hellcat

Marine Transport Squadron 216 (VMR-216) was a reserve cargo squadron of the United States Marine Corps that was based out of Washington. Known as the "Bulldogs", VMR-216 started out as a fighter squadron and participated in numerous combat engagements in the Pacific Theater during World War II to include the Battle of Guam and the Battle of Iwo Jima. The squadron was decommissioned shortly after the end of the war but was reactivated in 1946 as part of the Marine Air Reserve. The squadron remained in the Reserve until being decommissioned on 21 December 1972.

== History ==
=== World War II ===
Marine Fighting Squadron 216 was formed at Marine Corps Air Station El Centro, California in January 1943 but was not officially commissioned until 16 September 1943 with Major Rivers J. Morrell, Jr. in command. Initially training in FM-1 Wildcats, the squadron transitioned to the Vought F4U-1 Corsair and operated roughly 18 of these aircraft at any one time.

VMF-216 was the first squadron to land at the recently opened Torokina Airfield on 10 December 1943. By this time VMF-216 had at least partially transitioned to the F4U-1A Corsair, featuring a bubble canopy.

On 4 August 1944, VMF-216 joined VMF(N)-534, VMF-217, and VMF-225 on Guam following the invasion of the island by United States forces. Following this, they were based on the Essex Class aircraft carrier USS Wasp (CV-18) starting in early February 1945. Flying from the Wasp on 16 February 1945 as part of Task Force 58, VMF-216 took part in fighter sweeps against military airfields in the vicinity of Tokyo. Led by their commanding officer, Maj George E. Dooley, VMF-216 Corsairs strafed and bombed airfields at Yokosuka and Tateyama. Following the carrier raids on Tokyo, the squadron provided close air support for Marine assault forces during the Battle of Iwo Jima. The squadron remained aboard until Wasp retired to the west coast for overhaul of battle damage. On 13 March 1945, VMF-216 was relieved and began transit back to the United States via Guam and Hawaii. The squadron was decommissioned on 10 March 1946 at Marine Corps Air Station Santa Barbara.

=== Reserve Years ===
VMF-216 was reactivated on 1 July 1946 at Naval Air Station Seattle, Washington. The squadron was mobilized for a year during the Korean War beginning on 22 October 1951. In 1958 it moved to Naval Air Station Whidbey Island. On 1 December 1962 the squadron was redesignated as Marine Transport Squadron 216 (VMR-216) and continued training until finally being decommissioned on 21 December 1972.

== See also ==
- United States Marine Corps Aviation
- List of active United States Marine Corps aircraft squadrons
- List of decommissioned United States Marine Corps aircraft squadrons
