= VMA-217 =

Marine Attack Squadron 217
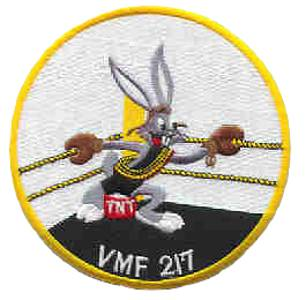
- VMF-217’s WWII Insignia
- Active: 1946-1964
- Country: United States
- Allegiance: United States of America
- Branch: United States Marine Corps
- Type: Fighter squadron
- Role: Air interdiction Close air support
- Part of: Inactive
- Nickname: "Max’s Wild Hares"
- Tail Code: 7Z
- Engagements: World War II * Battle of Iwo Jima

Aircraft flown
- Attack: A-4 Skyhawk
- Fighter: F4F Wildcat; F4U Corsair; F6F Hellcat

Marine Attack Squadron 217 (VMA-217) was a fighter squadron of the United States Marine Corps that was activated and fought during World War II. Known as "Max’s Wild Hares", they fought in many areas of the Pacific War including the Battle of Iwo Jima. Following the surrender of Japan, the squadron was deactivated on 10 March 1946. They were briefly reactivated as part of the Reserves but were again deactivated in 1964 and remain in an inactive status today.

== History ==
VMF-217 was activated at Marine Corps Air Station El Centro, California on 15 September 1942. The squadron did the majority of its training on the F4F Wildcat as there was a shortage of F4U Corsairs. They remained there and trained until 12 December 1943 when they went to Naval Air Station North Island, only to be embarked on the USS Barnes (CVE-20) a week later for transit to the Pacific Theater. The squadron arrived on Espiritu Santo on 5 January 1944, and soon moved to Bougainville on 28 January 1944. Two days later the squadron began striking the bypassed Japanese garrison at Rabaul. The flight echelon returned to Espiritu Santo on 19 March 1944 and remained until 1 June 1944 when they embarked on the USS Santee (CVE-29), USS Cetus (AK-77) and a few other ships for a voyage to Guam.

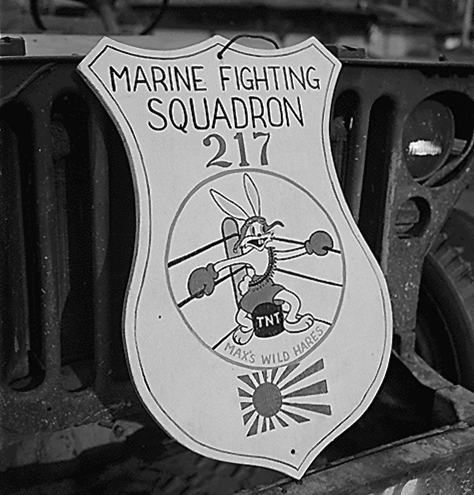
Insignia on Jeep, 1944

The successful conclusion of the Solomon Islands campaign and the neutralization of Rabaul meant that there was an excess of Marine Fighter Squadrons available in the Pacific at this time.

Beginning on 7 August 1944, the squadron commenced strikes against the island of Rota. All personnel from VMF-217 were ashore on Guam by 20 August 1944.

On 16 February 1945, the squadron took part in a raid on Tokyo as part of Task Force 58. Taking off from the USS Wasp (CV-18) they, along with their sister squadron VMF-216, participated in an attack on the airfields at Yokosuka and Tateyama. After the Tokyo bombing, the squadron went to Iwo Jima to provide close air support for the Marines on the ground during the battle.

In May 1945, the squadron returned to the United States, Marine Corps Air Station Santa Barbara, California, for reorganization and training for escort carrier duty. It was here that the squadron began training on the F6F Hellcat because all of the available F4U Corsairs were needed for anti-Kamikaze duty. At the time of the surrender of Japan they were attached to Marine Carrier Group 7 (MCVG-7) aboard the USS Point Cruz (CVE-119) and were preparing for another deployment. The squadron was deactivated at Naval Air Station San Diego on 10 March 1946.

VMF-217 was briefly reactivated from 1953 to 1964 in the Marine Forces Reserve, flying the A-4 Skyhawk at Naval Air Station South Weymouth, Massachusetts. In 1955, they were redesignated VMA-217. After deactivation, its assets were transferred to VMA-322.

== Unit awards ==
A unit citation or commendation is an award bestowed upon an organization for the action cited. Members of the unit who participated in said actions are allowed to wear on their uniforms the awarded unit citation. VMA-217 has been presented with the following awards:

| Ribbon | Unit Award |
|---|---|
| | Navy Unit Commendation |
| | Asiatic-Pacific Campaign Medal |
| | World War II Victory Medal |
| | National Defense Service Medal with one Bronze Star |

== See also ==
- United States Marine Corps Aviation
- List of active United States Marine Corps aircraft squadrons
- List of decommissioned United States Marine Corps aircraft squadrons
