= Dennison Airport =

- IATA: none; ICAO: none

Summary
- Operator: Private
- Location: Quincy, Massachusetts
- Built: Unknown
- In use: 1926-Before 1941
- Occupants: Private
- Elevation AMSL: 3 ft / 1 m
- Coordinates: 42°17′26.62″N 71°1′30.16″W
- Interactive map of Dennison Airport

Dennison Airport was an airfield operational in the mid-20th century in Quincy, Massachusetts, United States.

== History ==
In 1927, a small civilian airfield was established at Squantum near the intersection of East Squantum Street and Quincy Shore Drive. Amelia Earhart, when she lived in Medford, Massachusetts, was a share-holding director and helped finance the construction of the airport. She also flew on the first official flight out of the airport on September 3, 1927. On September 28, 1927, Thea Rasche, a famous German aviator, crashed at Dennison Airport while attempting to land her Flamingo biplane The plane was damaged, but Rasche was uninjured. Dennison Airport closed down in 1942 and its land was taken over by the Navy for the expansion of the Naval Air Station Squantum.

== See also ==
- Naval Air Station Squantum
