= Naval Air Station South Weymouth =

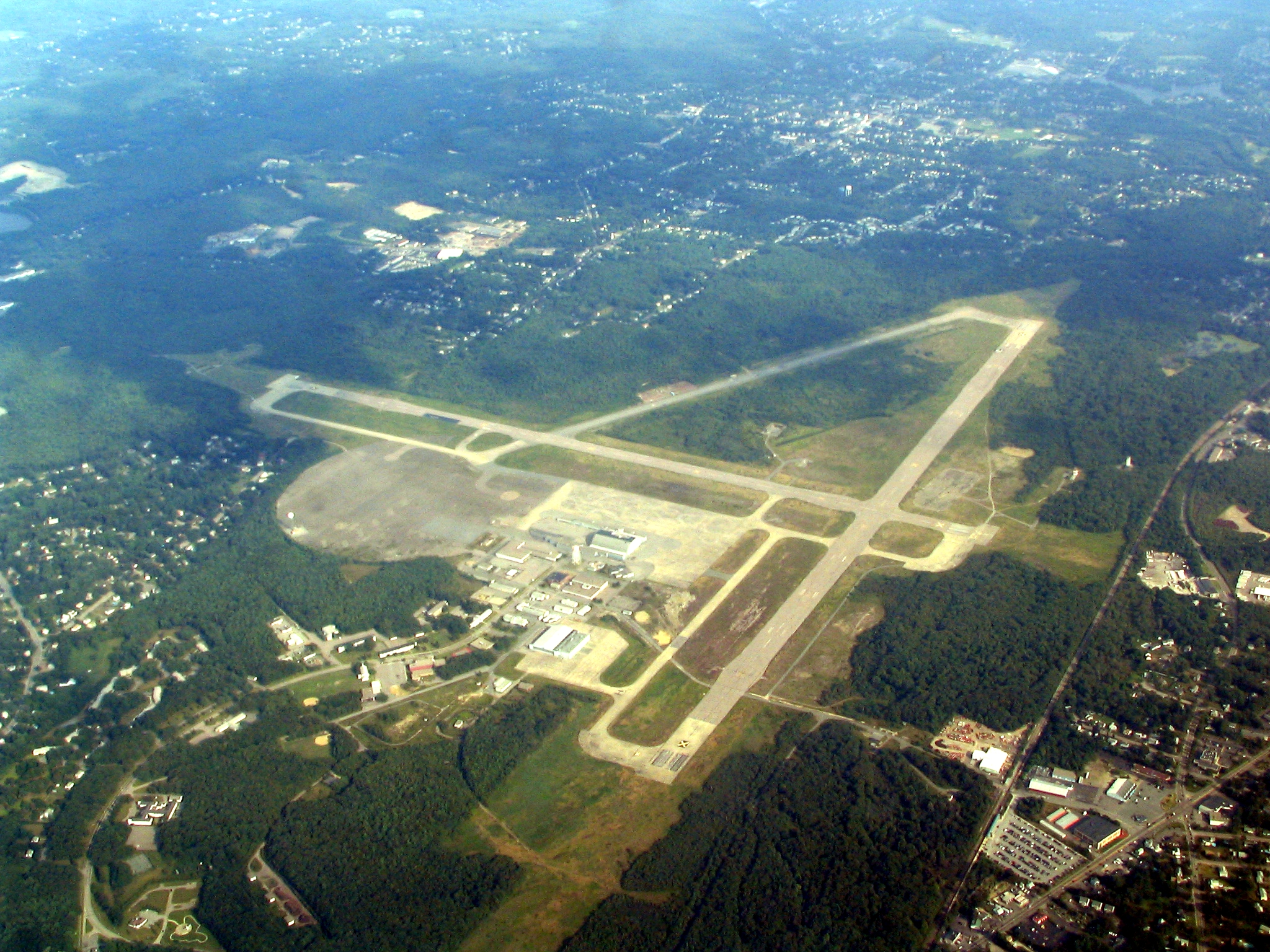
- NAS South Weymouth in 2006
- IATA: ~~NZW~~; ICAO: KNZW; FAA LID: NZW

Summary
- Airport type: Military: naval air station
- Operator: United States Navy
- Location: Weymouth, Rockland, and Abington, Massachusetts
- Built: 1941–1942
- In use: (NAS) 1942–1945, (NAF/NAPS) 1945–1949, (ALF) 1949–1953, (NAS) 1953–1997
- Occupants: Navy, Marines, and Coast Guard
- Elevation AMSL: 148 ft (45 m)
- Coordinates: 42°08′55″N 070°56′23″W
- Interactive map of Naval Air Station South Weymouth

Runways
Direction	Length		Surface
Direction	ft	m	Surface
17/35	7,000	2,129	Asphalt/concrete
08/26	6,000	1,829	Asphalt/concrete
02/20	5,000	1,520	Asphalt/concrete
- Closed to all aviation traffic

Naval Air Station South Weymouth was an operational United States Navy airfield from 1942 to 1997 in South Weymouth, Massachusetts. It was first established as a regular Navy blimp base during World War II. During the postwar era the base became part of the Naval Air Reserve Training Command, hosting a variety of Navy and Marine Corps reserve aircraft squadrons and other types of reserve units. Like most BRAC sites, environmental contamination was detected in 1986, and since 1993 numerous remedies and long term monitoring of ground water are in place. Since 2005, over 600 acres have been transferred to the affected towns for reuse, and in 2011 the Navy signed a $25 million contract to transfer its remaining land.

== World War II ==
In 1938, the site was surveyed as a possible location for a municipal airport, which was never built. Construction work on the base began in September 1941 and the base was commissioned as the United States Naval Air Station South Weymouth on 1 March 1942. During World War II the base's primary mission was to provide support for anti-submarine blimp operations. In its original as-built format South Weymouth's main facilities consisted of two gigantic blimp hangars, the earlier (LTA Hangar One or "The Big Hangar") of steel construction and the second (LTA Hangar Two) of the more common World War II standardized design of nearly all-wooden construction employed to conserve rationed metals. The base also had a 2,000-foot-diameter (610 m) Macadamized blimp landing mat, six mooring circles, and a 4,500-foot-long (1,400 m) cinder-surfaced turf runway.

Throughout the war with Germany, NAS South Weymouth served as the home base of airship patrol squadron ZP-11, which operated up to twelve K-class blimps employed on ASW patrols and convoy escort missions in and around Massachusetts Bay and the Gulf of Maine. Some historians and former Navy personnel allege that a ZP-11 blimp, the K-14, which crashed with loss of life off the coast of Bar Harbor, Maine on 2 July 1944 was actually shot down by a German submarine.

In addition to ZP-11, NAS South Weymouth also hosted wartime detachments of airship patrol squadron ZP-12 based at NAS Lakehurst, New Jersey and airship utility squadron ZJ-1 based at Meacham Field in Key West, Florida. ZJ-1 was unique, being the only airship utility squadron in the Navy. ZJ-1's South Weymouth detachment (Detachment 1) flew K and G-class airships in support of electronics research projects conducted by the Massachusetts Institute of Technology, performed aerial photography missions, and helped to recover test torpedoes for the Navy torpedo station in Newport, Rhode Island. A sub-detachment operated from Elizabeth Field on Fisher's Island, New York.

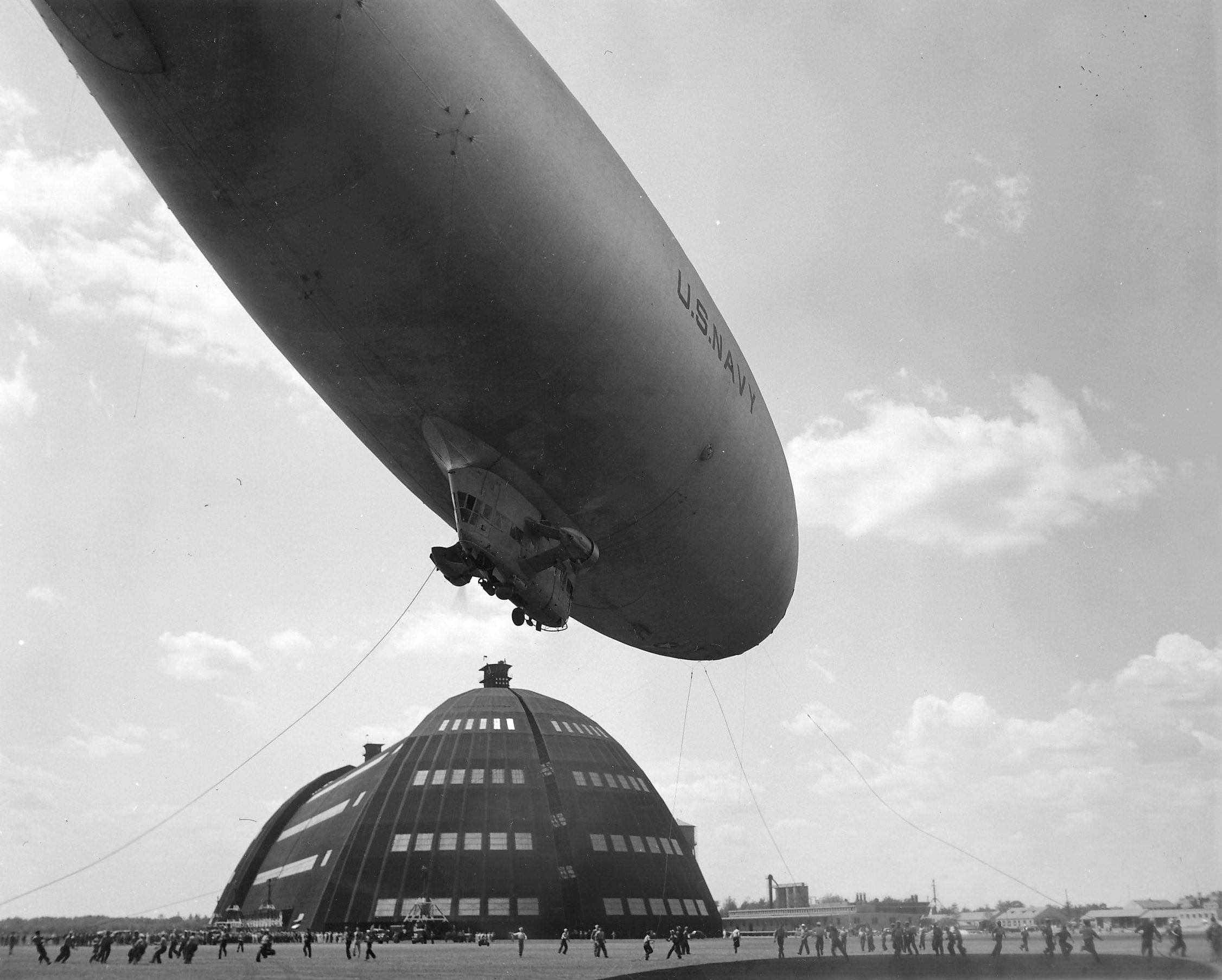
K-38 making an emergency landing at South Weymouth

In 1944, NAS South Weymouth was the starting point for the first transatlantic crossings of non-rigid airships. United States Navy K-ships (blimps) K-123 and K-130 from Blimp Squadron 14 (also known as ZP-14, Blimpron 14, or "The Africa Squadron") left South Weymouth on 28 May 1944 and landed at Argentia, Newfoundland about 16 hours later. The two K-ships then flew approximately 22 hours to Lagens Field on Terceira Island in the Azores. The last leg of the flight was a ~20-hour flight to their destination with Fleet Air Wing (FAW) 15 at Port Lyautey, French Morocco (now Kenitra, Morocco). Blimps K-123 & K-130 were followed by K-109 & K-134 and K-112 & K-101 which left South Weymouth on 11 and 27 June, respectively, in 1944. These six blimps initially conducted nighttime anti-submarine warfare operations to complement the daytime missions flown by FAW-15 aircraft (PBYs and B-24s) using magnetic anomaly detection to locate U-boats in the relatively shallow waters around the Straits of Gibraltar. Later, ZP-14 K-ships conducted minespotting and minesweeping operations in key Mediterranean ports and various escort missions including that of the convoy carrying Franklin Roosevelt and Winston Churchill to the Yalta Conference in early 1945.

== Post-war demobilization and Cold War use ==
South Weymouth was downgraded from a naval air station to a naval air facility on 9 August 1945 after Germany surrendered, thus ending the U-Boat threat to the east coast, and was thereafter used to store surplus naval aircraft that were awaiting final disposition. Many of these aircraft, especially Eastern/Grumman TBM/TBF Avengers, were subjected to elaborate cocooning and preservation methods in the two huge blimp hangars. During this period of South Weymouth's history the base was known as a naval aircraft parking station or "NAPS". Naval Air Facility (NAF) South Weymouth was placed into caretaker status on 30 June 1949 and downgraded again to a Navy Auxiliary Landing Field (NALF).

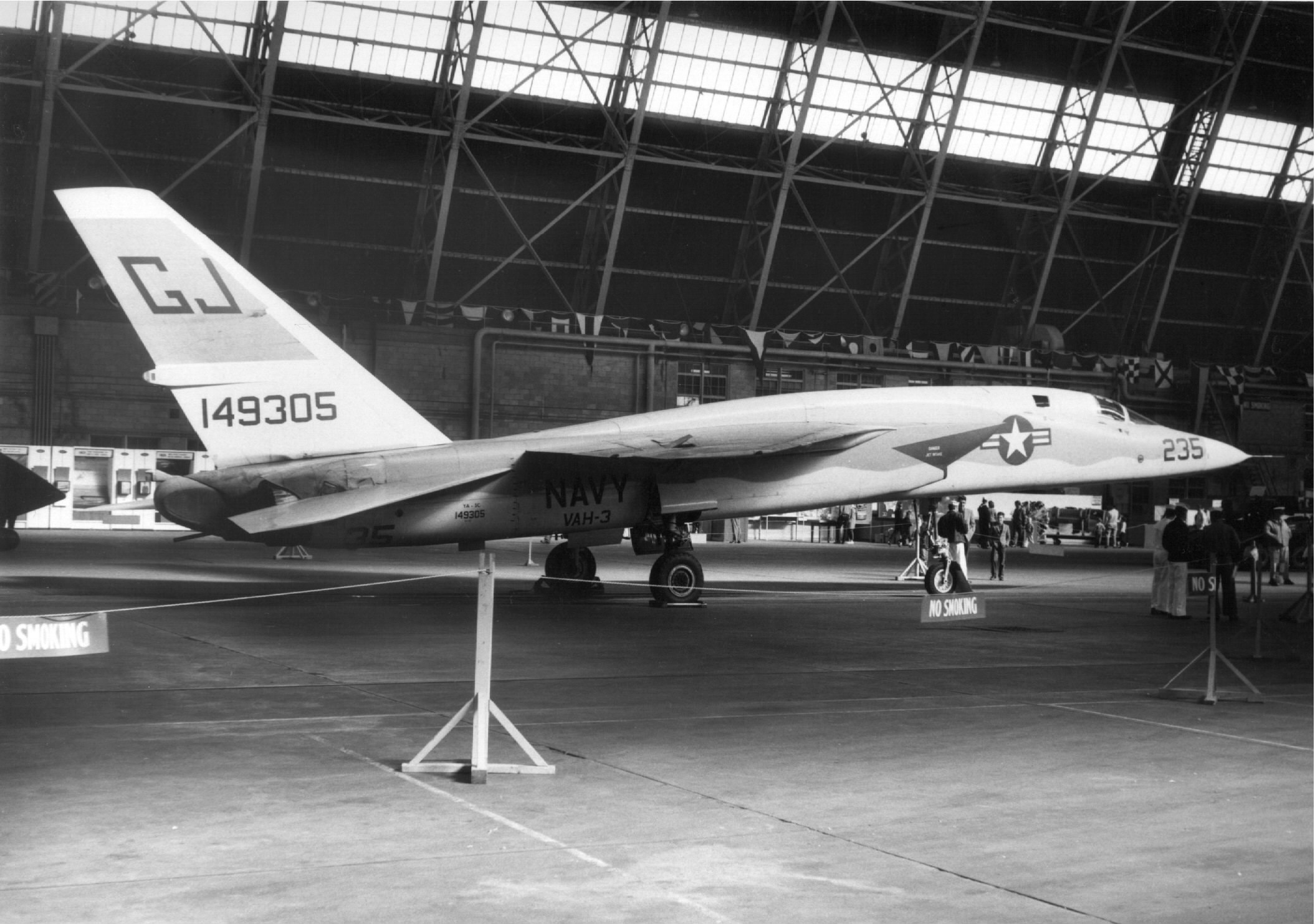
YA-5C Vigilante, in 1963

In 1950 the Navy decided to close Squantum Naval Air Station, traditionally the focus of Navy and Marine Corps reserve aviation training in New England, and move the reserve program to NALF South Weymouth. The decision to close NAS Squantum resulted from increasing incidents of airspace conflicts with Boston's commercial airport (modern-day Logan International Airport) in nearby East Boston and due to the fact that Squantum's relatively short and landlocked (waterlocked?) runways were not capable of supporting high-performance jet aircraft.

Between 1952 and 1953 NAAF South Weymouth was rebuilt to make it more suitable for supporting conventional aircraft operations. In its original World War II format, the base was not really intended for regular use by heavier-than-air aircraft. Its cinder-covered turf runways were only intended for transient aircraft, the station's Beech GB Traveler, and other light utility aircraft. During the 1952–1953 reconstruction effort LTA Hangar Two (the wooden blimp hangar) was razed, three new paved runways (7,000-foot (2,100 m) north–south runway 17/35, 2,000-foot (610 m) east–west runway 08/26, and 5,000-foot (1,500 m) diagonally aligned runway 02/20) were built, and a CPN-4 ground-controlled-approach facility and modern control tower (the wartime base's control towers were located on top of LTA Hangar One) were established. South Weymouth was reactivated as a reserve training base and fully-fledged naval air station on 4 December 1953.

Though officially a reserve base, NAS South Weymouth hosted an unusual regular Navy unit between 1953 and 1961. This was a secretive research and development outfit called the Naval Air Development Unit, known as "NADU" for short. The NADU, which derived in a way from Special Project Unit (SPU) CAST based at Squantum Naval Air Station during World War II, was tasked with providing flight testing support for research projects associated with the MIT Lincoln Laboratories and other defense contractors. Mainly, these research projects involved experimental electronic equipment such as radars associated with air defense and anti-submarine warfare systems. The NADU operated a diverse aircraft fleet that included (among other things) Lockheed WV-2 Warning Stars, Douglas F4D Skyrays, Douglas A3D Skywarriors, Lockheed P2V Neptunes, and the ZPG-2W, which were the world's largest blimps.

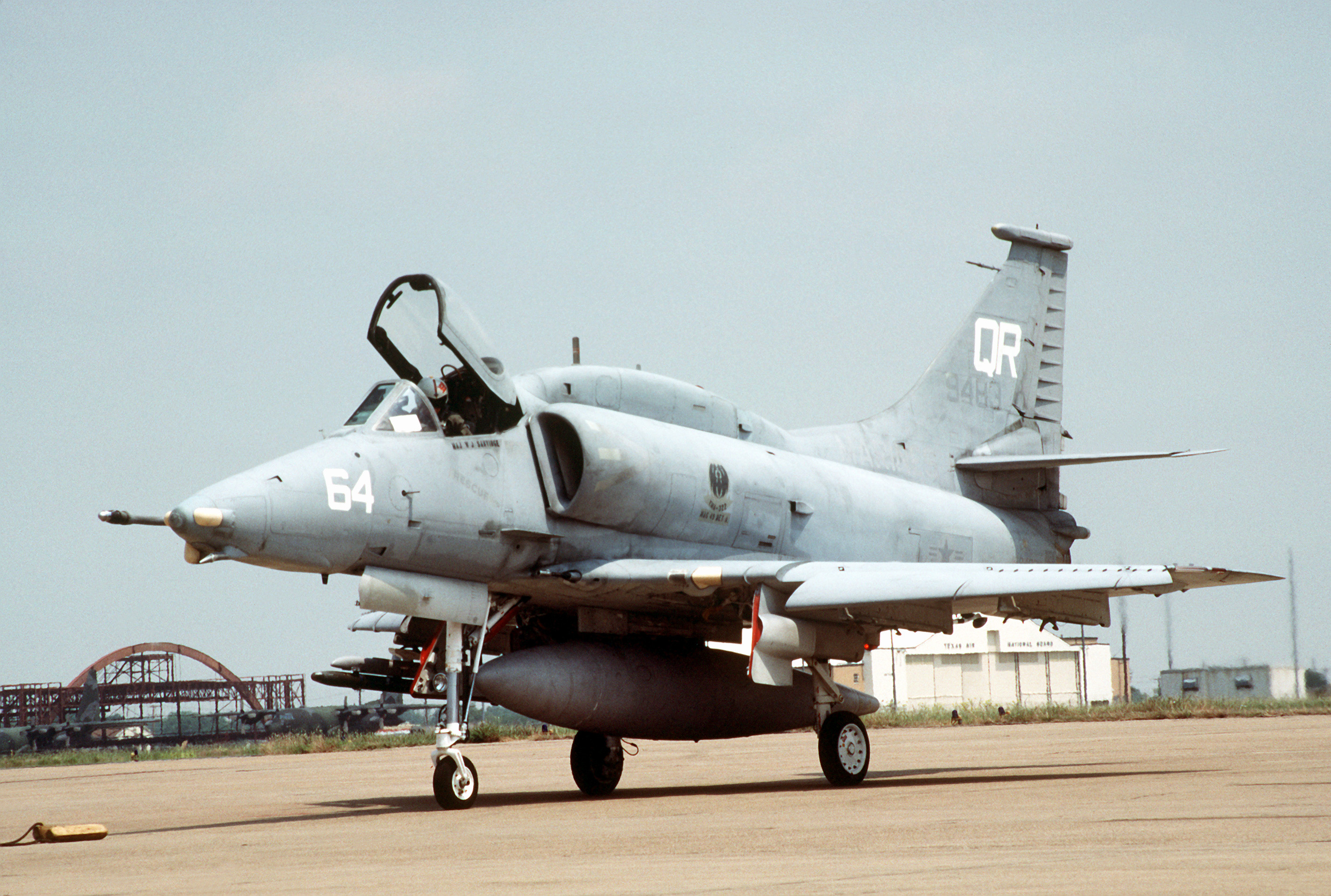
An A-4M of VMA-322 on the ramp in Texas

In December 1956 a new hangar, Hangar No. 2, was completed adjacent to runway 17/35 to support the fixed-wing ASW and attack squadrons. Runway 08/26 was lengthened to 6,000 feet during 1959. The construction work required on the eastern end of this runway permanently severed Union Street, which had served as a major thoroughfare connecting the towns of Rockland and Weymouth. Blimp operations were discontinued at NAS South Weymouth in July 1961 in advance of the disestablishment of the Naval Air Development Unit on 1 October.

In March 1957, a ZPG-2, the Snow Bird, piloted by Commander Jack Hunt, USN, took off from South Weymouth, and landed 10½ days later at Naval Air Station Key West, after making two crossings of the Atlantic Ocean. The airship with a crew of 13 set a new "distance record of 9,740 miles, and an endurance record without refueling. All told, Snow Bird spent just over eleven days aloft in covering 9,448 miles without refueling. For his performance on the flight, the airship commander, CDR Jack R. Hunt, USN, received the Harmon International Trophy (e.g., Harmon Trophy) for Aeronautics.

Two reserve anti-submarine squadrons were activated at NAS South Weymouth during the Berlin Crisis. VS-915, which was based at NAS South Weymouth, was activated on 1 October 1961. It was joined by VS-733 transferred from NAS Grosse Ile, MI on 1 November. Both squadrons flew operational ASW patrols from NAS South Weymouth and detachment sites such as Key West and Guantanamo Bay, Cuba for nearly a year.

During the 1960s the station hosted a pair of unique Anti-Submarine Warfare Operational Flight Trainers. These consisted of two retired aircraft fuselages, a Grumman S-2A Tracker (crash damaged) and a Lockheed SP-2E Neptune (fire damaged), that were placed on the flat roof of the so-called "lean-to" on the southern side of LTA Hangar One. The radar scopes and other ASW sensors positioned at the tactical crew positions in these two aircraft fuselages were connected to signal generating devices located in the ASW Training Department spaces in the hangar, allowing them to serve as fixed tactical training simulators for reserve aircrewmen.

Steel blimp hangar LTA Hangar One, a local landmark, was demolished in 1966 and replaced with a much smaller concrete arch hangar (Hangar #1). The new hangar was not completed until November 1970, due in large part to a disaster on 18 August 1967 when several concrete arches collapsed, killing two civilian crane operators. The base had target ranges at the nearby Nomans Land Island and the Liberty Ship SS James Longstreet. The base hosted the Navy Weymouth Aero Club from 1961 until the club's closure in 1984.

== Base Realignment and Closure Commissions ==
=== BRAC 1991 ===
The 1991 Base Realignment and Closure Commission decided to close the base in its recommendations. It was decided against because of the community's objections.

=== BRAC 1993 ===
The 1993 Base Realignment and Closure Commission decided to close the base in its recommendations. The community argued that it was important and was ranked higher than other bases scheduled for realignment. This argument was acknowledged as well as the fact that the commission did not include demographics in its decision. The base remained open for the time being.

=== BRAC 1995 ===
The Navy Meritorious Unit Commendation Ribbon

The Base Realignment and Closure Commission of 1995 recommended that South Weymouth close in 1997 and its last remaining squadrons be realigned. VP-92, which flew P-3 Orions and VR-62, which flew C-130 Hercules transports, went to NAS Brunswick, Maine before the base was officially deactivated and closed by order of the 1995 BRAC. In 1996, it was awarded the Navy Meritorious Unit Commendation ribbon for the years 1993–1995.

== Redevelopment ==
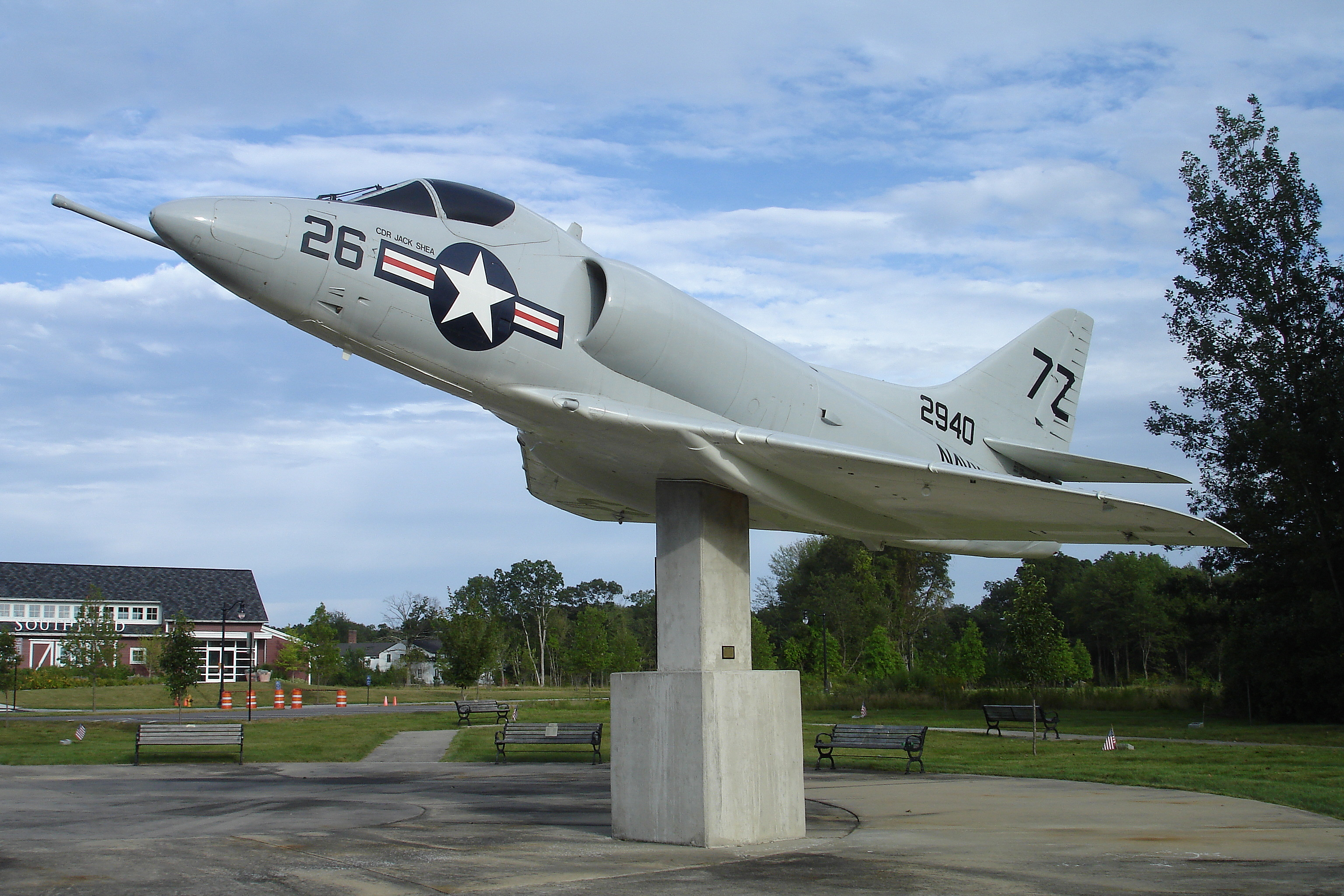
Douglas A-4 Skyhawk memorial at the entrance to Shea Field

In March 1998, an initial reuse plan was approved by a three-town vote for office/retail use, senior housing, golf course, and ballfields. In 1998, the Massachusetts Legislature established the South Shore Tri-Town Development Corporation, representing Abington, Rockland and Weymouth, the three towns that were part of the station; in 2002 Tri-Town selected a master developer of the site, which in 2013 sold its interests to developer Starwood Land Venture, an affiliate of Starwood Capital Group. In 2005, a revised reuse plan incorporating many of EPA's Smart Growth concepts was approved by the three affected towns.

In December 2008, a deal was reached to build a movie studio complex on the site. The $100 million complex, to be called SouthField Studios, was planned to include 11 sound stages, production offices and other office space. Construction was set to begin in August 2009, but stalled due to financing difficulties.

A condominium community development called "SouthField" was planned, construction work began during December 2010 and the first homes were sold and occupied by summer 2011. Over 600 acres have already been transferred to the local reuse authority, the U.S. Coast Guard, and the Federal Aviation Administration. In November 2011, the Navy and Tri Town signed a purchase and sales agreement for the remaining 834 acres of the base; about 708 acres of the 834 acres are available for transfer and 126 acres will be leased until the property has been cleaned up or closed out and deemed suitable for transfer by the EPA.

As of June 2014, the master developer "Starwood wanted state lawmakers to approve legislation that would rewrite oversight of the project by the end of the formal legislative session on July 31", and that "[...] it could walk away from the project if that doesn't happen." Starwood wants responsibility for providing public services and collecting property taxes to shift from Tri-Town to the three towns. Tri-Town asked the Navy to intervene, which has declined. In August, the state Senate enacted Starwood Land Ventures' proposed legislation and thus reduced Tri-Town's role.

Tri-Town was reconstituted as the Southfield Redevelopment Authority that month. As of 2018, the development is known as Union Point, planned as a smart city with self-driving cars from Optimus Ride, about 4,000 homes, 10 million square feet (930,000 m^{2}) of commercial space, green roofs, ponds, and open space including hiking and biking trails. Plans include a market in the former hangar, arch, college campus, movie theatre, hotel, and sports complex. The development is adjacent to South Weymouth station, which is served by the Kingston Line of the MBTA Commuter Rail system. The development presented a bid for siting of Amazon HQ2, but did not make the finalist round of 20.

On March 26, 2020, a fire broke out in abandoned buildings on the grounds of the former Naval Air Station, about 1,000 feet (300 m) from the nearest housing. The buildings, formerly officer barracks, were destroyed in what officials considered a "suspicious" fire. Days later, investigators determined it was arson.

=== Military activities and museum ===
The U.S. Coast Guard maintains a buoy maintenance facility near the old railroad spur to the station. An A-4 Skyhawk jet mounted on a pedestal in a small park called the "Shea Memorial Grove", named for Squantum reservist CDR John "Jack" Shea who was killed in action when the aircraft carrier USS Wasp was sunk during World War II, remains as a perpetual reminder of the site's naval heritage. The jet, the park, and a small Navy museum (the Shea Field Naval Aviation Historical Museum) located in the former base gymnasium building (The Shea Fitness Center) are maintained by a local veterans' organization called the Association of Naval Aviation Patriot Squadron. The museum serves as a repository of photographs, documents, and other artifacts pertaining to NAS Squantum and NAS South Weymouth.

== Units hosted ==
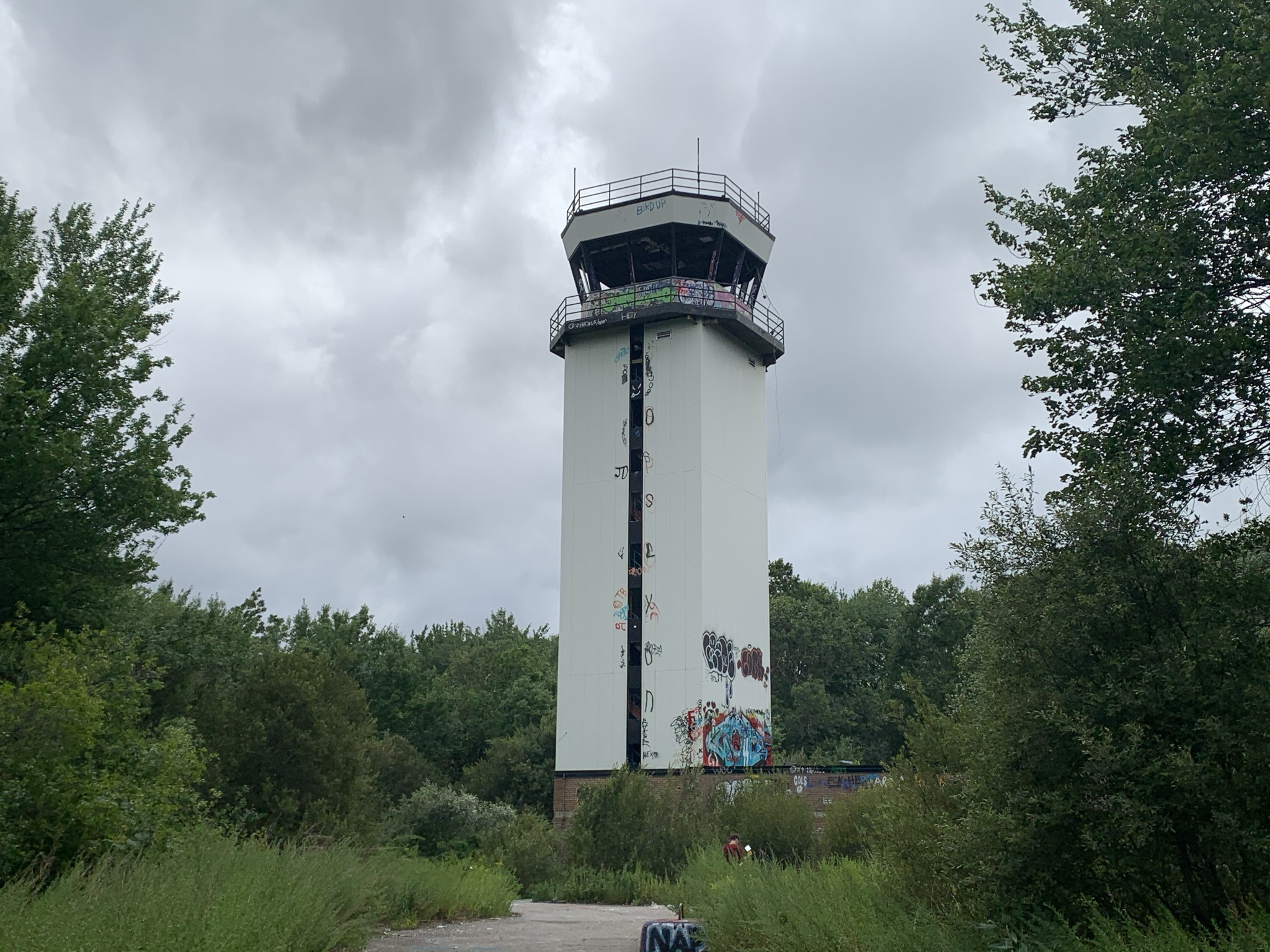
The defunct control tower in 2020

=== United States Marine Corps ===
- MGCIS-21 (1953–1954) Marine Ground Controlled Intercept Squadron
- VMF-217 (1953–1958) "Max's Wild Hares”
- VMF-322 (1953–1958) "The Cannon Balls”
- MACS-21 (1954–1967) Marine Air Control Squadron, formerly MGCIS-21
- MARG-4 (1957–1969) Marine Air Reserve Group
- VMA-217 (1958–1964) Formerly VMF-217
- VMA-322 (1958–1992) "The Fighting Gamecocks", formerly VMF-322
- HMR-771 (1958–1963) "The Hummingbirds”
- HMM-771 (1963–1971) Formerly HMR-771
- 24th Staff Group (1969–1981)
- HML-771 (1971–1994) Formerly HMM-771
- MWFTS-410 (1971–1979) Marine Wing Facilities Training Squadron, formerly MWFS-5
- MACG-9191 (1977–1978) Marine Air Control Group
- MWSS-474 Now MWSS 472 Det-B, Westover ARB, Chicopee, MA
- MALS-49

=== United States Navy ===
- ZP-11 (1942–1945)
- BLIMPHEDRON-1-11 (1943–1945) DET 11 of BLIMPHEDRON-1 based at NAS Lakehurst, NJ
- ZJ-1-1 (1944–1945) DET 1 of ZJ-1 based at Meacham Field, FL
- ZP-12-1 (1945) DET 1 of ZP-12 based at NAS Lakehurst, NJ
- VU-5 Drone Unit (1949) Detachment of VU-5 based at NAS Quonset Point, RI
- HU-911 (1953–1958)
- VA-911 (1953–1955)
- VA-912 (1953–1955)
- VA-913 (1953–1955)
- VF-911 (1953–1955)
- VF-914 (1953–1955)
- VF-915 (1953–1955) "The Fighting Beavers”
- VF-917 (1953–1955)
- VP-911 (1953–1968)
- VR-911 (1953–1968)
- VR-912 (1953–1967)
- VS-911 (1953–1962)
- VS-912 (1953–1967)
- ZP-911 (1953–1958)
- VFJ-911 (1955–1958) Formerly VF-911
- VFJ-912 (1955–1958)
- VFJ-914 (1955–1958) Formerly VF-914
- VFJ-915 (1955–1958) Formerly VF-915
- VFJ-917 (1955–1958) Formerly VF-917
- VS-913 (1955–1962) "The Down-Easter Squadron”
- HU-912 (1956–1958)
- VP-912 (1956–1968)
- VP-913 (1956–1968)
- VR-913 (1956–1968)
- VR-914 (1956–1963)
- VS-914 (1956–1968)
- HS-911 (1958–1968) Formerly HU-911
- HS-912 (1958–1968) Formerly HU-912
- HS-913 (1958–1959)
- VP-914 (1958–1965)
- VS-915 (1958–1965)
- VS-916 (1958–1962)
- ZW-1 (1959–1960) Detachment of squadron based at NAS Lakehurst, NJ
- CFAS-911 (1959–1960) Carrier Fleet Aircraft Service Squadron, formerly CVFAS-911
- VS-733 (1961–1962) Temporarily transferred from NAS Grosse Ile, MI for Cuban Missile Crisis
- VAJ-911 (1962) "The Blackhawks”
- VAJ-912 (1962) "The Old Pros”
- VA-911 (1962–1968) Formerly VAJ-911
- VA-912 (1962–1968) Formerly VAJ-912
- VP-915 (1962–1968)
- VP-916 (1962–1963)
- VP-917 (1962–1963)
- HS-62Z1 (1968–1969) Formerly HS-911
- HS-62Z2 (1968–1969) Formerly HS-912
- VA-2Z1 (1968–1970) Formerly VAJ-911
- VA-6Z2 (1968–1970) Formerly VAJ-912
- VP-63Z1 (1968–1970) Formerly VP-911
- VP-63Z2 (1968–1970) Formerly VP-912
- VP-63Z3 (1968–1970) Formerly VP-913
- VP-11Z4 (1968–1970) Formerly VP-915
- VR-62Z1 (1968–1970) Formerly VR-911
- VR-1Z2 (1968–1970) Formerly VR-912
- VS-62Z1 (1968) Formerly VS-912
- VS-1Z2 (1968) Formerly VS-914
- VS-70Z1 (1968–1970) Formerly VS-62Z1
- VS-27Z2 (1968–1970) Formerly VS-1Z2
- HS-70Z1 (1969–1970) Formerly HS-62Z1
- HS-66Z2 (1969–1970) Formerly HS-62Z2
- HS-5Z3 (1970)
- VA-210 (1970–1971) "The Blackhawks"
- VP-92 (1970–1996) "The Minutemen”
- HS-74 (1973–1985) "The Big Mothers" from NAS Quonset Point, RI
- VRF-31 COMP 291 (1981–1987) Aircraft Ferry Squadron
- HSL-74 (1985–1994) "The Demon Elves", formerly HS-74
- VR-62 (1994–1996) "The Nor' Easters" from NAF Detroit, MI

=== Other services ===
- USCG Detachment (1954–1959) USCGR unit flying USNR PBYs and P4Y-2s
- 704th AA Battalion (1954–1959) Battery C of 704th Mass National Guard Anti-Aircraft Battalion
- 6520th Test Support Wing (1955–1957) DET of USAF unit based at Hanscom Field in Bedford, MA

== See also ==
- List of military installations in Massachusetts
- Navy Air Stations Blimps bases
