= Naval Air Station Squantum =

Naval aviation facility in Massachusetts

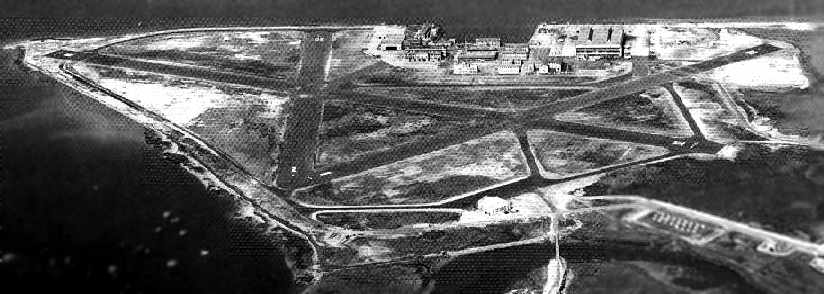
- Squantum during World War II
- IATA: none; ICAO: none

Summary
- Airport type: Military: Naval Air Station
- Operator: United States Navy
- Location: Quincy, Massachusetts, USA
- In use: 1917 and 1923–1953
- Occupants: Navy, Marines, and Coast Guard
- Elevation AMSL: 6 ft / 2 m
- Coordinates: 42°17′47″N 071°01′52″W
- Interactive map of Naval Air Station Squantum

Runways
| Direction | Length | | Surface |
| Direction | ft | m | Surface |
|---|---|---|---|
| 14/32 | 4,090 | 1,247 | Asphalt |
| 2/20 | 2,500 | 762 | Asphalt |
| 8/26 | 3,087 | 941 | Asphalt |
- Redeveloped

Naval Air Station Squantum was an active naval aviation facility during 1917 and from 1923 until 1953. The original civilian airfield that preceded it, the Harvard Aviation Field, dates back to 1910. The base was sited on Squantum Point in the city of Quincy, Massachusetts. It also abutted Dorchester Bay, Quincy Bay, and the Neponset River.

== History ==
Early military usage of the airfield dates to the early months of U.S. involvement in World War I when the Massachusetts Naval Militia (a forerunner to the United States Naval Reserve) built a small wooden seaplane hangar and pier on the Dorchester Bay shoreline adjacent to the former Harvard Aviation Field. Primary flight instruction was provided at the Massachusetts School for Naval Air Service, as the tiny seaplane base was originally called, to members of the Massachusetts Naval Militia who would subsequently go on to take advanced flight training at the Navy's flying school at Pensacola, Florida. In May 1917 the Navy took the seaplane base over and evicted the Sturtevant Aeroplane Company from the former Harvard Aviation Field as well. The Navy continued to use the U.S. Naval Air Station Squantum as a primary flight training facility until the end of September 1917 when all naval flight training activity was consolidated in areas of the country with better year-round flying weather.

Thereafter, much of land surrounding the former seaplane base and Harvard Aviation Field was taken over by the Navy Department for the construction of a new shipyard called the Victory Destroyer Plant. The Victory Plant, which was owned by the government but operated by the Bethlehem Shipbuilding Corporation, was designed specifically to mass-produce one type of ship, the Clemson-class destroyers. A total of 35 were built at the Victory Plant before the shipyard closed on 1 June 1920.

During the summer of 1923 then-Lieutenant Richard E. Byrd, with the assistance of a group of volunteer Navy veterans of the First World War, helped found the NRAS (Naval Reserve Air Station) at Squantum Point using the disused First World War seaplane hangar, which had remained more-or-less intact after the Victory Plant shipyard was built. NRAS Squantum, which was commissioned on 15 August 1923, is considered to have been the first air base in the Naval Reserve program.

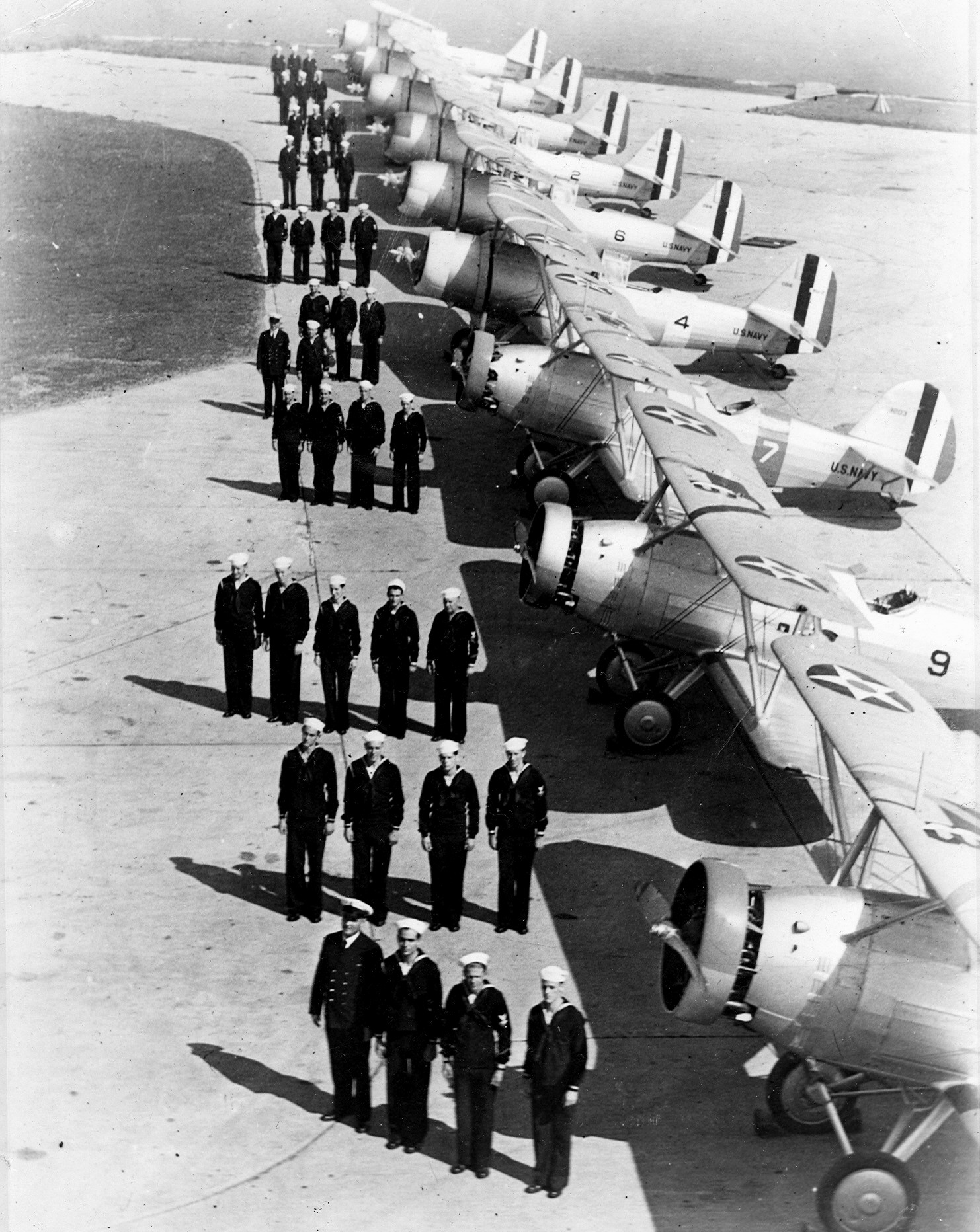
OJ-2s and SBUs of VS-2R lined up for inspection, in 1938.

During October 1929 a small turf airfield was opened at NRAS Squantum. Up to this point, NRAS Squantum was a seaplane base only, though occasional naval landplane operations were conducted using the airfield at the nearby Dennison Airport. In early 1930, possibly because of the addition of the airfield, Squantum was redesignated a Naval Reserve Air Base or NRAB.

Throughout the 1930s decade NRAS Squantum was greatly improved and expanded, in the manner of an aerodrome, without defined runways. This was due in large part to the ingenuity of executive officer John J. Shea, a man who knew how to leverage and make the most out of volunteer labor, salvaged materials, and Depression-era public works programs like the Works Progress Administration. The greatest expansion efforts on the base took place between 1939 and 1941 when, among other things, three "proper" paved runways were built (in contrast to the earlier "aerodrome" design) and the old Victory Plant Shipyard buildings (many of which had been gutted during a previous fire) were razed. On 5 March 1941 the base at Squantum was redesignated a Naval Air Station or NAS.

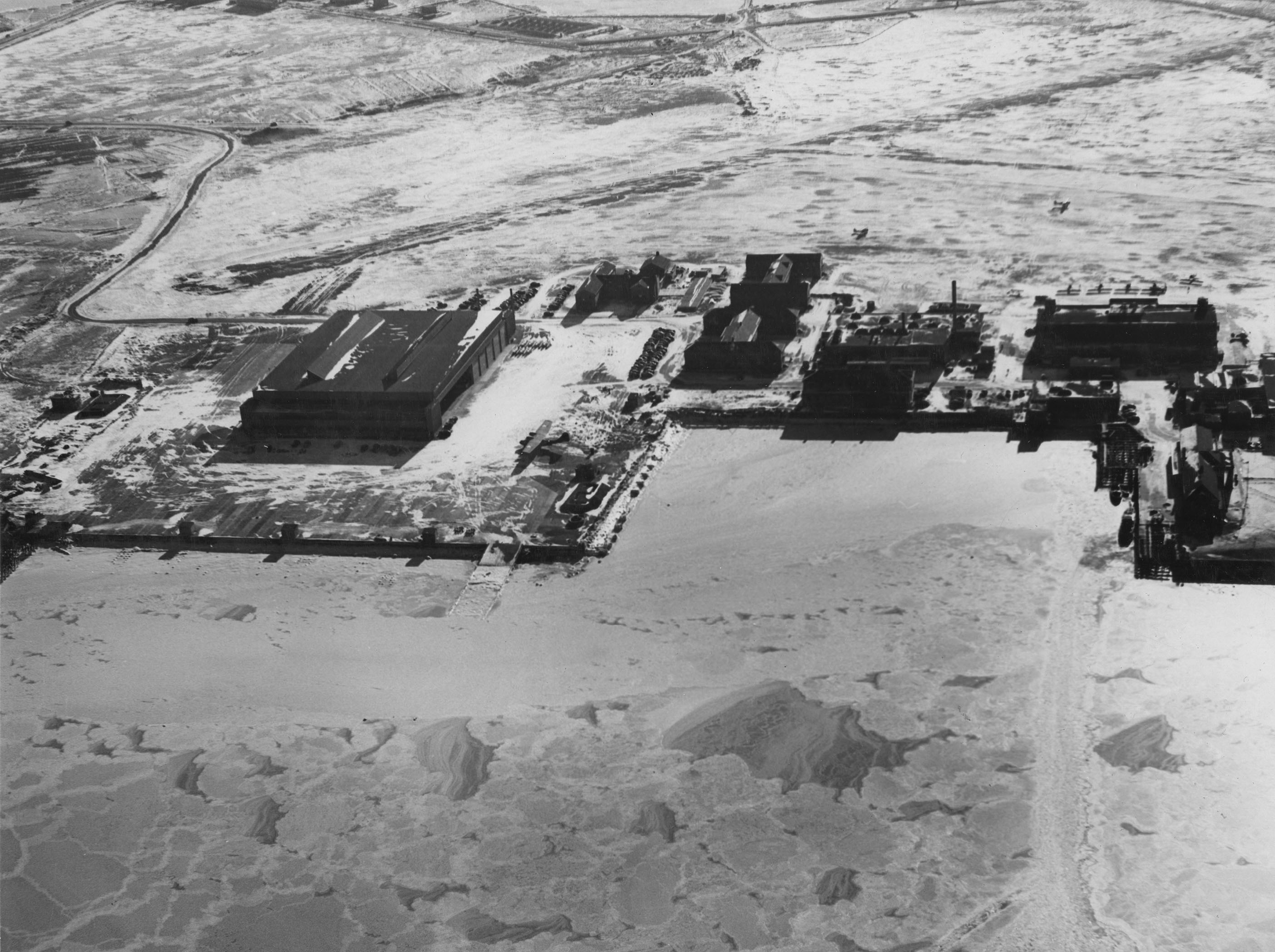
Naval Air Station Squantum, Massachusetts December 1942.

During the Second World War NAS Squantum served as a maritime patrol as well as a training base for American and British naval aviators. Regular Navy squadrons VJ-4 and VS-1D1/VS-31 flew anti-submarine patrols over Massachusetts Bay and the Gulf of Maine using Grumman J2F Ducks, Consolidated PBY Catalinas, Vought-Sikorsky OS2U Kingfishers, Douglas SBD Dauntlesses, and Curtiss SB2C Helldivers. In addition, the base provided elimination and primary flight instruction for Naval Aviation Cadets as well as advanced training to Fleet Air Arm (Royal Navy) torpedo and dive-bomber squadrons, and U.S. Navy fighter, torpedo, and dive-bomber squadrons. It was at Squantum that baseball legend Ted Williams did his paperwork to join the Civilian Pilot Training Program during the war.

After the war ended, NAS Squantum became an important component of the new Naval Air Reserve Training Command, some of types based there in numbers being Consolidated PBY-5A/6A Catalinas, Curtiss SB2C-5/CCF SBW-4E Helldivers, Vought F4U-4 and Goodyear FG Corsairs, Douglas R4D Skytrains, North American SNJ Texans and Grumman F6F-5 Hellcats. The base served as the focus of Navy and Marine Corps reserve aviation training activity in New England until December 1953 when the reserve program was moved to nearby NAS South Weymouth where longer runways would be available and Squantum was closed. The CO's SNB made the official last flight from Squantum when aircraft were transferred en masse to South Weymouth, however, an Avenger with maintenance problems became the last plane to actually depart a few days later. Squantum's base housing would continue to be used, however, for decades as military housing for the Boston area.

"Modern" NAS Squantum had a couple of problems. First, its proximity to Boston's Logan International Airport resulted in increasing airspace conflicts in the postwar era; the Boston Logan Instrument Landing System was in alignment with Runway 2 of Squantum. In one case, an Air France Lockheed Constellation bound for Boston actually landed at Squantum by mistake. The base's second problem was its short and landlocked (water locked?) runways. These were not long enough to support routine jet operations and because of the base's position on the Squantum peninsula they could not be lengthened. The 1946 and 1949 USGS topographic maps labeled the property as "U.S. Naval Reservation", but did not depict an airfield. The base's third problem was that it was old and that many of its facilities had been jury-built using scrap materials and re-used structures salvaged from the Victory Plant Shipyard during the depths of the Great Depression when funds were hard to come by. It was said of NAS Squantum in the January 1949 issue of Naval Aviation News that it "grew like topsy" and was more the result of having to make do with what was available instead of careful planning.

== Closure ==
The location of the airport doomed it to be closed in 1953. Operations were moved to the nearby NAS South Weymouth. In 1957, the Navy transferred 5 acres (2.0 ha) to the Air Force, which made the Squantum Electronics Research Annex. The site was labeled as an "Abandoned Airport" in 1960.

== Present-day usage ==
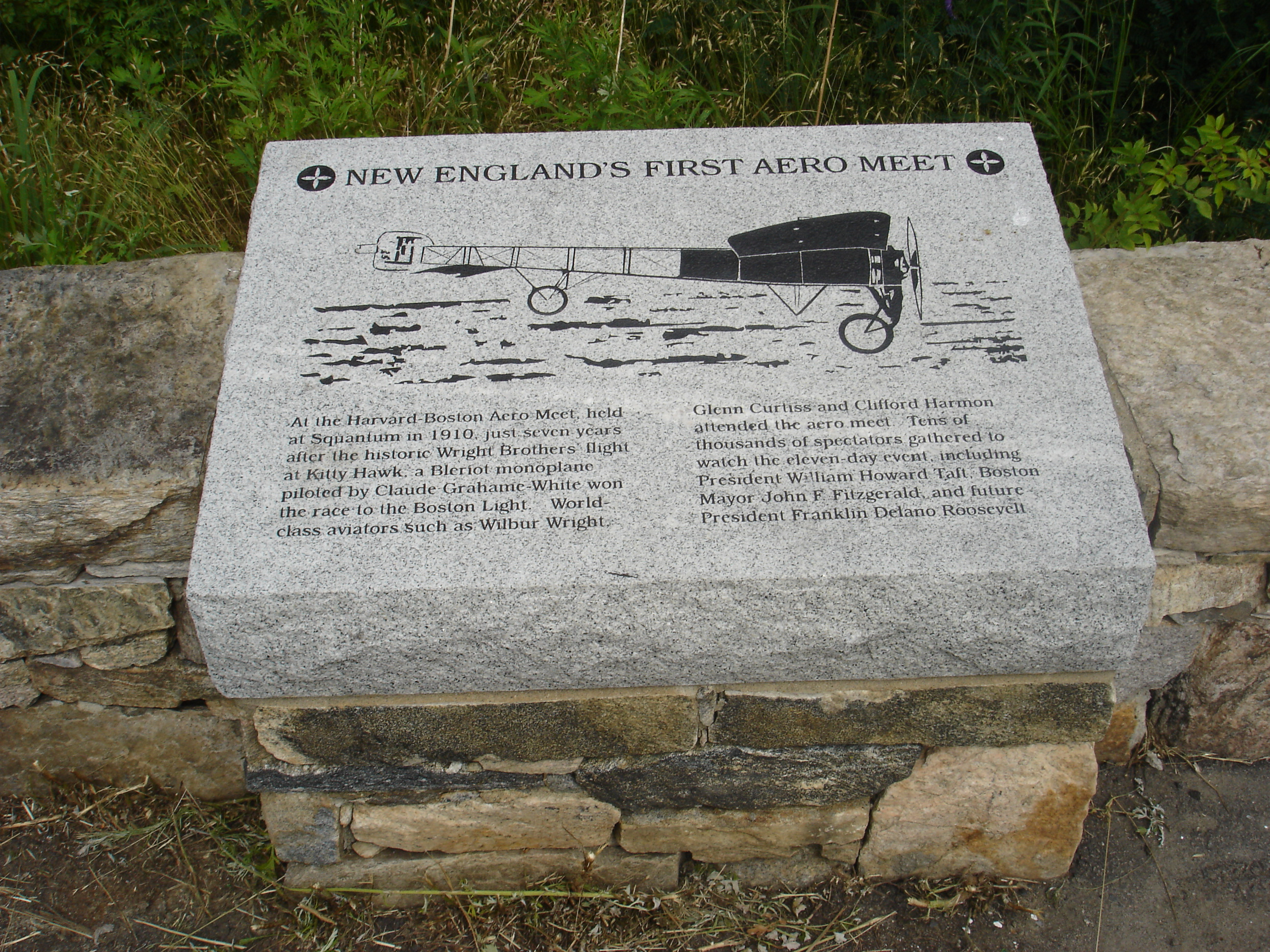
One of several informational plaques in Squantum Point Park, this one commemorating the Harvard-Boston Aero Meet of 1910

Today a marina sits on its northern end; the air station's main hangar was its main building into the 1990s. Boston Scientific is also located on the site. A 2,700-foot (820 m) portion of the primary northwest runway was opened to the public in 2001 as Squantum Point Park. Other than that, condominiums and other buildings forming the Marina Bay development dot the landscape of the former naval air station. A local veterans' organization, the Association of Naval Aviation Patriot Squadron, operates and maintains a small museum called the Shea Field Naval Aviation Historical Museum dedicated to preserving the heritage of NAS Squantum and NAS South Weymouth in the former Navy gymnasium (The Shea Fitness Center) located on CDR Shea Boulevard at former NAS South Weymouth (the SouthField Development) in Weymouth, Massachusetts.

== Squadrons based there ==
- VS-4 (Administratively assigned to Squantum but based in Boston)
- VF-11 (Administratively assigned to Squantum but based in Boston)
- VN-1RD1 (Formerly VS-4)
- VN-2RD1 (Formerly VF-11)
- VF-6MR
- SC-5MR
- VO-1MR (Formerly VF-6MR)
- SS-5MR (Formerly SC-5MR)
- VS-1R (Formerly VN-1RD1)
- VS-2R (Formerly VN-2RD1)
- VMS-1R (Formerly VO-1MR and SS-5MR combined)
- VJ-4 (Detachment of squadron based at NAS Norfolk, VA)
- VS-1D1 (Inshore Patrol squadron established at NAS Squantum)
- VR-1 (Detachment of squadron based at NAS Norfolk, VA)
- VS-31 (Formerly VS-1D1)
- SPU Cast (Supported various electronic systems projects)
- 848 Squadron (Royal Navy Fleet Air Arm torpedo squadron)
- 849 Squadron (Royal Navy Fleet Air Arm torpedo squadron)
- 850 Squadron (Royal Navy Fleet Air Arm torpedo squadron)
- 851 Squadron (Royal Navy Fleet Air Arm torpedo squadron)
- 852 Squadron (Royal Navy Fleet Air Arm torpedo squadron)
- 853 Squadron (Royal Navy Fleet Air Arm torpedo squadron)
- 854 Squadron (Royal Navy Fleet Air Arm torpedo squadron)
- 855 Squadron (Royal Navy Fleet Air Arm torpedo squadron)
- 856 Squadron (Royal Navy Fleet Air Arm torpedo squadron)
- 857 Squadron (Royal Navy Fleet Air Arm torpedo squadron)
- SPU Dove (Supported Project Dove infra-red guided anti-shipping bomb)
- 820 Squadron (Royal Navy Fleet Air Arm dive-bomber squadron)
- CASU-22-5 (Detachment of CASU based at NAS Quonset Point, RI)
- VF-45 (CAG-45)
- VT-45 (CAG-45)
- VF-48 (CAG-48)
- VT-48 (CAG-48)
- VT-89
- VF-21 (CAG-21)
- VT-21 (CAG-21)
- VT-151
- VF-39 (CAG-39)
- VT-39 (CAG-39)
- VT-44
- VF-29 (CAG-29)
- VT-29 (CAG-29)
- SPU Cadillac (Supported Project Cadillac AEW system)
- VJ-15 (Detachment of squadron based at NAS Quonset Point, RI)
- VF-723 (CVG-723)
- VBF-723 (CVG-723)
- VB-723 (CVG-723)
- VT-723 (CVG-723)
- VF-796 (CVEG-796)
- VT-796 (CVEG-796)
- VF-797 (CVEG-797)
- VT-797 (CVEG-797)
- VP-919
- VMF-217 (Marine Corps Reserve)
- CASU-713 (Reserve Carrier Aircraft Support Unit)
- VMF-235 (Marine Corps Reserve, activated for Korean War)
- VF-77A (CVG-77, formerly VF-723)
- VF-78A (CVG-77, formerly VBF-723)
- VA-77A (CVG-77, formerly VB-723)
- VA-78A (CVG-77, formerly VT-723)
- VF-56A (CVG-56, formerly VF-796)
- VA-56A (CVG-56, formerly VT-796)
- VF-57E (CVG-57, formerly VF-797)
- VA-57E (CVG-57, formerly VT-797)
- VP-ML-69 (Formerly VP-919)
- VR-57
- FASRON-71 (Reserve Fleet Aircraft Support Squadron, formerly CASU-713)
- FASRON-171 (Reserve Fleet Aircraft Support Squadron, formerly CASU-713)
- VR-59
- MGCIS-21 (Marine Corps Reserve Ground Control Intercept unit)
- VF-58L (CVLG-58)
- VA-58L (CVLG-58)
- AVUA-1 (Drilled at NAF Brunswick, ME)
- AVUA-2 (Drilled at New Bedford Airport in New Bedford, MA)
- AVUA-3 (Drilled at Barnes Airport in Westfield, MA)
- AVUA-4 (Transferred from NAF South Weymouth to NAS Squantum)
- AVUA-5 (CIC unit drilling at NAS Squantum)
- AWS-91 (Air Wing Staff 91)
- FASRON-911 (Formerly FASRON-71 and FASRON-171)
- VC-911 (Composite attack squadron)
- VC-912 (Composite anti-submarine warfare squadron)
- VC-913 (Composite anti-submarine warfare squadron)
- VF-911
- VF-912
- VF-913
- VF-914
- VF-915
- VF-916 (Activated for Korean War, became VF-83 then VFA-83)
- VF-917
- VP-911 (Formerly VP-ML-69)
- VR-911 (Formerly VR-57)
- VR-912 (Formerly VR-59)
- AVUA-6 (Drilled at NAS Squantum)
- ZP-911
- VA-911 (Formerly VC-911)
- VA-912
- VA-913
- VS-911
- VS-912 (Formerly VC-912)
- VS-913 (Formerly VC-913, activated for Korean War, became VS-39)
- AAU-911 (Formerly AVUA-2)
- AAU-912 (Formerly AVUA-3)
- AAU-913 (Formerly AVUA-4)
- AAU-914 (Formerly AVUA-5)
- AAU-915 (Formerly AVUA-6)
- AGU(L)-911 (Large auxiliary ground unit)
- VMF-322 (Replacement for VMF-235)
- HU-911

== See also ==
- Quincy, Massachusetts
- Marina Bay
- Dennison Airport
- List of military installations in Massachusetts
