= International Aviation Meet at Belmont Park =

Aviation contests held in Elmont, New York

Coordinates: 40°42′54″N 73°43′22″W

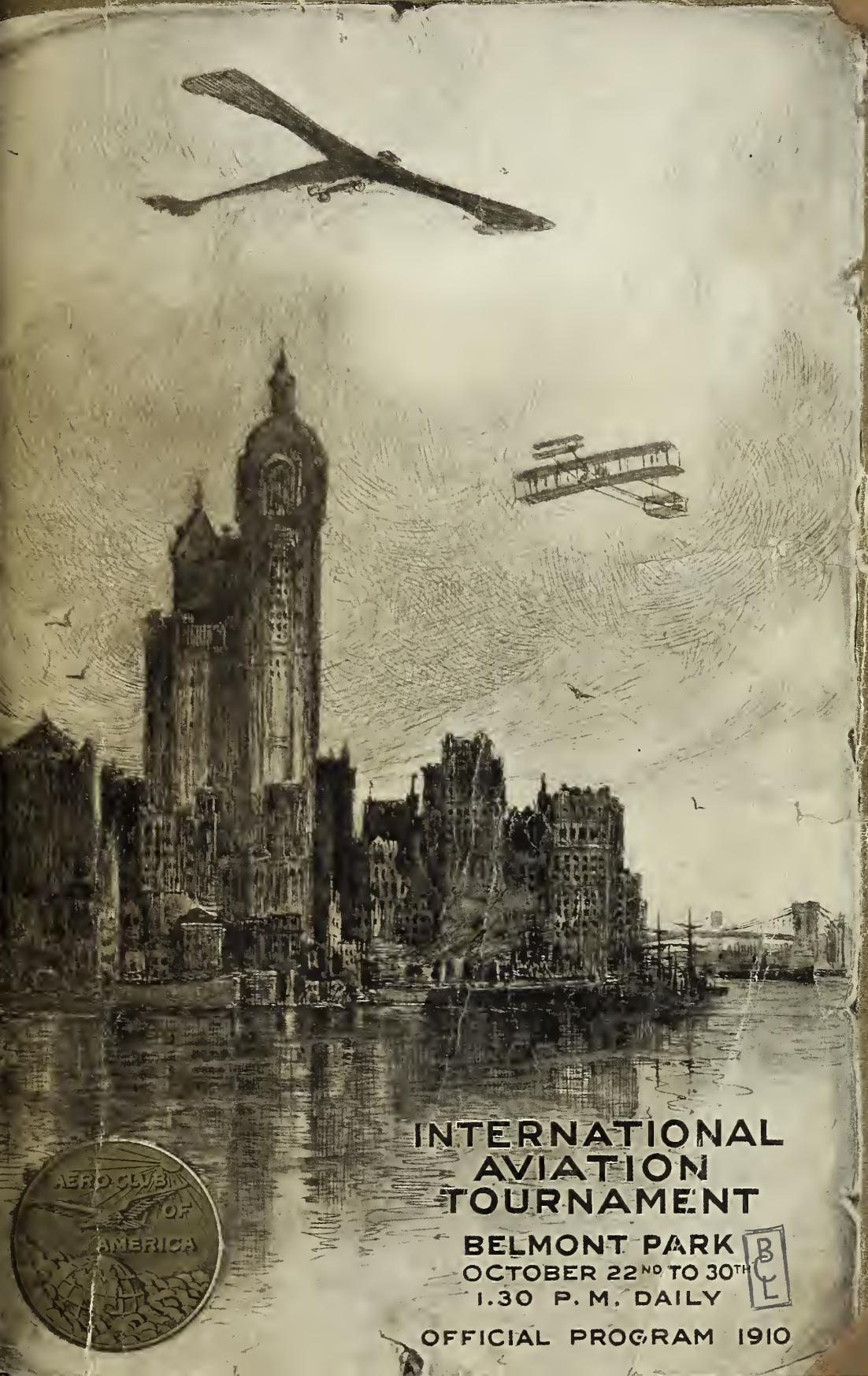
- Belmont Park program (1910)
- Date: October 22–31, 1910
- Duration: 9 days
- Venue: Belmont Racetrack
- Location: Belmont Park
- Also known as: Belmont Park aviation meet
- Type: air show
- Patrons: Wright brothers; Thomas Fortune Ryan
- Organized by: Aero Club of America
- Participants: Aviators

The Belmont Park aviation meet was an international air show that took place in 1910. The Belmont Racetrack in Elmont, New York, United States, was the site of the aviation meet. The event took place over nine days and featured aerial races, and contests involving duration, distance, speed and altitude.

The show was managed and organized by the Aero Club of America and it took place over nine days, October 22–31, 1910. Featured aviators included Wilbur Wright, Alfred Leblanc, Émile Aubrun, René Simon, John Moisant and Claude Grahame-White. The show awarded prize money of US$72,300 (equivalent to $2,487,857 in 2025); revenue from gate receipts for the show totaled US$188,000 (equivalent to $6,496,071 in 2025).

== Background ==
The air show was the idea of Andrew Freedman who was a director of the Wright Company. The company was started by the Wright brothers who were American aviation pioneers. They became the first to pilot a heavier-than-air flying machine on December 17, 1903. On August 9, 1910, the Committee of Arrangements members were announced at the Finance Committee of the Aero Club of America. The members of the Committee of Arrangements were Alan A. Ryan, Clifford B. Harmon and W. Redmond Cross. August Belmont Jr. was a Wright Company stockholder and he was selected to be the president of the event's organizing committee. The venue that the committee selected was August Belmont's racetrack at Belmont Park. They selected Belmont so that they could save money by using the existing stands and they were able to enclose the grounds.

By October 9, 1910, the park was being prepared for the air show. The workers used electric light to work at night. The main grandstand was expanded to accommodate the people who were expected. The organizers also had to construct hangars for the airplanes: the hangars were 1,000 ft (300 m) long and 15 ft (4.6 m) high. Aviators began to arrive on October 9 including Frenchmen Alfred Leblanc and Jacques Faure, and American John Moisant.

== History ==
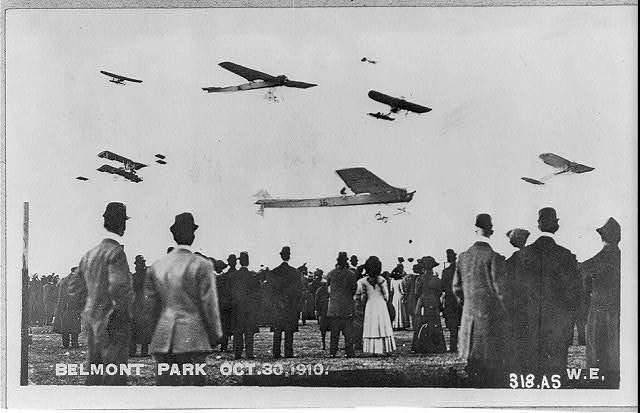
Belmont Park (October 30, 1910)

Thirty aviators attended the nine day event and the prizes were valued at US$72,300 (equivalent to $2,487,857 in 2025). Some of the featured aviators included Wilbur Wright, Alfred Leblanc, Émile Aubrun, René Simon, John Moisant and Claude Grahame-White. The aviation meet was the second international tournament and the contests involved, duration, distance, speed and altitude. Some of the featured events included: the Scientific American Trophy, Michelin Cup, and the Statue of Liberty Flight. The 100-kilometer (62 mi) Gordon Bennett Cup Race was also a featured competition for the Gordon Bennett International Aviation Trophy and US$5,000 (equivalent to $172,768 in 2025).

Harriet Quimby became interested in aviation when she attended the event. It was there that she met John Moisant and his sister Matilde. John and his brother Alfred operated a flight school in Long Island, New York. Quimby, and Matilde Moisant both decided that they wanted to learn to fly and after the show they began taking classes with Alfred Moisant. Quimby went on to become the first American female to become a licensed pilot, on August 1, 1911.

John Moisant crashed twice, the first time he crashed trying out his new Blériot aircraft on October 19. When he was helped from his plane he said, "Hurt? No, not at all. Nothing ever happens to anybody flying." Later he had a warmup flight and he crashed second time. The second crash occurred October 23, 1910, in Moisant's passenger-carrying Blériot aircraft. The Associated Press reported that the plane was "badly smashed" and Moisant had to work through the night to complete repairs. He was forced to search for another aircraft and by the time he had found one, the Statue of Liberty race had already begun. He found that could not pass the other two competitors so he flew a different route.

James Radley won a race during the event on October 26, covering 20 miles in 19 minutes and 46 seconds, an American speed record.

Moisant won the featured Statue of Liberty race which was a 58-kilometer (36 mi) trip. The race began at Belmont, went around the Statue of Liberty and ended back at Belmont: Moisant won US$10,000 (equivalent to $345,536 in 2025). Thomas Fortune Ryan of Bethlehem Steel provided the prize money for the race. British aviator Claude Grahame-White registered a protest; he had finished second and he wanted to have another attempt.

The show was managed and organized by Aero Corporation Limited. The gate receipts for the show totaled US$188,000 (equivalent to $6,496,071 in 2025). The Wright Brothers were involved with the show and they sued the Aero Corporation over payments they were owed. William W. Niles spoke for the Aero Corporation and made claims that the expenses for the show totaled US$200,000 (equivalent to $6,910,714 in 2025).

The aviation committee met to discuss Grahame-White's protest. They decided that the contest was over and Moisant had won. Only three pilots flew in the race, Grahame-White, Moisant and Jacques de Lesseps.

In March 1911 (five months after the contest) the Board of Governors of the Aero Club met and decided to disqualify Moisant because they ruled that he had failed to accomplish a one-hour flight prior to his entry. The US$10,000 prize was awarded to de Lesseps, not second-place finisher Grahame-White, because Grahame-White had been disqualified when one of his wing tips hit a pylon during the race. Moisant had died on the morning of December 31, 1910, in an air crash near Harahan, Louisiana, prior to the decision. He had been making a preparatory flight for his attempt to win the 1910 Michelin Cup and the $4,000 prize for the longest sustained flight of 1910.
