= United States Aeronautical Reserve =

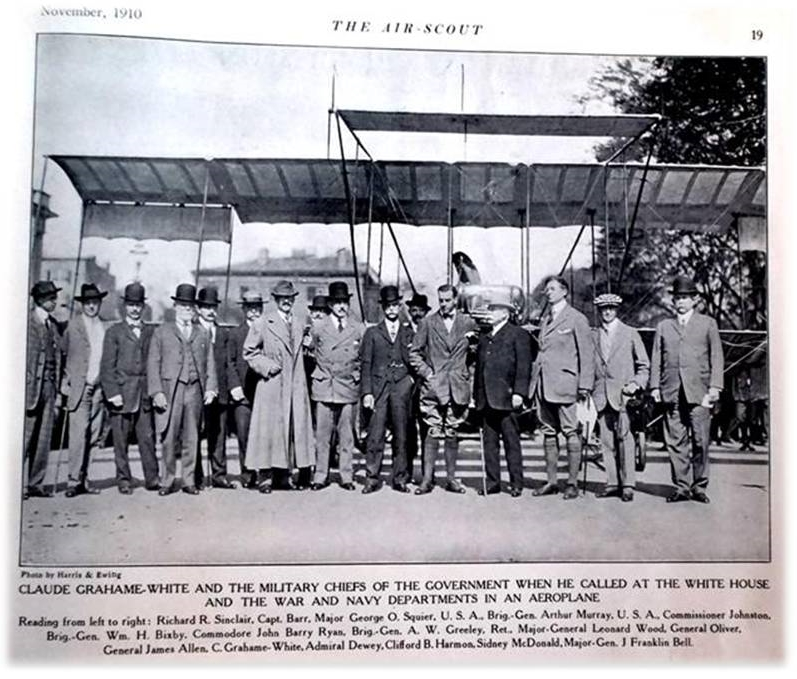
United States Aeronautical Reserve's General Secretary—Captain Richard R. Sinclair, with leading USA military officials and aviators in Washington, DC's military departments' area, The Air-Scout, November 1910.

The United States Aeronautical Reserve (U.S.A.R.) was an early aviation organization established by Harvard University’s Aero Club on September 8, 1910. The founder was John H. Ryan, and the General Secretary esd Richard R. Sinclair. The group's recruiting stations were at Harvard University, Mineola, and Belmont Park.

Some of the United States Aeronautical Reserve's General Board were Clifford Harmon, Chief of Staff; John Barry Ryan, Commodore; Herbert I. Satterlee, NY; John Barry Ryan, NY; Wilbur Wright, Dayton, Ohio; Glenn Curtiss, Hammondsport, NY; Cortland Field Bishop, NY; Hon. John F. Fitzgerald, Boston, MA; Charles H. Allen (Treasurer), NY and Richard R. Sinclair (Assistant Treasurer) NY. The United States Aeronautical Reserve military contacts were the Army’s Brigadier General James Allen, Aeronautical Division, U.S. Signal Corps, Chief Signal Officer; and Captain W. Irving Chambers of the Navy; and Major General Leonard Wood, Chief of Staff and U.S.A.R. member.

"With offices not far from those of the Aero Club of America in New York City, the U.S.A.R. by November 1910 claimed no less than 3,200 members, including William Howard Taft."

== Notable Members ==
The following are some of the more notable members of the organization, many of which being the early aviators and automobilists.

- Walter Brookins - Early aviator
- George M. Cox - British World War I flying ace
- Glenn Curtis - Founder of the U.S. aircraft industry
- Cromwell Dixon - Early aviator
- Charles Jasper Glidden - Automobiler
- Curtis Guild, Jr. - Massachusetts governor
- Edwin Gould - Investor and member of the Gould family
- Harry Harkness - Early aviator
- Charles K. Hamilton - Early aviator
- Clifford B. Harmon - Founding partner of Wood, Harmon & Co. and amateur aviator
- Nelson A. Miles - US Army Officer
- Augustus Post - Founder of the American Automobile Association (AAA)
- Herbert L. Satterlee - Lawyer
- William Howard Taft - U.S. President
- Wilbur Wright - Brother of the Wright Brothers, inventors of the airplane
- Charles F. Willard - Early aviator and barnstorming pioneer

== U.S.A.R. was officially recognized by the United States Department of War and United States Department of the Navy ==
The United States Aeronautical Reserve was officially recognized by the “War and Navy Departments,” and was “organized along strictly military lines, with a view of advancing the science as a means of supplementing the national defense . . . And they are anxious that the U.S.A.R. shall not be confused with other aero clubs in New York and other cities, which appear to be striving for existence along lines made famous by certain characteristics peculiar to the female inhabitants of Kilkenny.”

== Target practice bombing competition ==
In 1910, The United States Aeronautical Reserve founder John H. Ryan also started the Commodore John Barry International Target Practice Cup through the Aeronautical Society and offered a $10,000.00 prize for a winning “bomb throwing” contest from an airplane, and the bronze trophy statue was of “Commodore Barry who was the first Commodore in the American Navy.” The Washington Post reported in a social article in October 1910 that Harmon and Grahame-White split the prize., Ryan's plan in 1910 to create an airplane landing strip on the roof of the U.S.A.R.'s main headquarters in Manhattan's 53rd Fifth Avenue address in New York City was covered by the media. Ryan figured that by combining several rooftops, he would create a landing strip of approximately 250 feet long by 17 feet wide.

== The Air-Scout, U.S.A.R.'s official publication ==
In 1910, The United States Aeronautical Reserve’s General Board produced its official monthly publication, The Air-Scout, that later merged into Town & Country magazine.

The Air-Scout was an upscale glossy magazine, approximately 14 inches long and 17 inches wide, filled with U.S. aviation and foreign news. It also contained social pages (such as with socialite aeroplane supporters: Mr. and Mrs. Cornelius Vanderbilt, Mrs. Harry Payne Whitney, Miss Vivien Gould, Mrs. August Belmont, Mr. Allan A. Ryan, Colonel John Jacob Astor, Mrs. Mortimer Schiff, Mrs. Charles Gibson, Miss Lilla B. Gilbert, Miss Hannah Randolph . . .); a woman's aviator page (Baroness Raymond de La Roche of France was said to be the first woman to obtain a pilot license and operate an airplane) in several issues; wireless technology news; airship news, airplane contests, military aviation news including where the U.S.A.R. may be needed; and more. There were plenty of photos from war correspondents and other professional photographers and agencies. Many of the feature writers were U.S.A.R. members including Harry M. Horton credited with "creating the earliest longest distance wireless apparatus that was first used on an airplane in flight, military aviators and similar." There were many advertisements in the publication.

== Industrial airplane shows ==
In 1911, the First International Industrial Airplane Show was held in conjunction with the 11th U.S. International Auto Show at Manhattan’s Grand Central Palace, in New York City. The aviation show was the invent of the Aero Club of New York, and the event had the largest Palace attendance ever recorded back then., The United States Aeronautical Reserve had an exhibition booth with interesting airplane displays and a demonstration on January 5, 1911 of early wireless communication technology utilizing the "Wilcox aeroplane equipped with Horton [Harry M. Horton] wireless apparatus" used to communicate from the airplane to the land-based news media and to test distance with steamships out at sea., The Aeronautical Society and the United States Aeronautical Reserve had their full-size airplane displays in the second gallery of the Grand Central Palace among other full-size airplanes. Charles W. Chappelle, a member of the United States Aeronautical Reserve, exhibited a full-size airplane which won him a medal for being the only African-American to invent and display an airplane.

== Military Airplane display in Washington, D.C., U.S.A.R. requests Grahame-White as pilot ==
United States Aeronautical Reserve asks Grahame-White to be one of the first pilots to demonstrate the effectiveness of an airplane for military usage. Grahame-White successfully flies airplane down the avenue at the Executive Offices location (considered a difficult maneuver requiring a skilled pilot) in Washington, DC in front of the several military departments with many leading military officers watching, and hundreds of Signal Corps officers timing speed. The Air-Scout, October 1910.

Both the Boston Daily Globe and the United States Aeronautical Reserve's (U.S.A.R.'s) The Air-Scout covered Grahame-White landing an airplane near the War Office in Washington, D.C., in October 1910. It was a distance and speed demonstration display, with the U.S.A.R. requesting Grahame-White to perform the test in front of hundreds of military personnel that stood outside and watched as he successfully landed his airplane in a narrow street within a few minutes from a satisfactory distance.

According to the Boston Daily Globe, ". . . and within 10 minutes, had landed lightly on the narrow roadway between the White House and the war department, at the feet of General Leonard Wood and within a few yards of the window of President Taft's office." The Boston Daily Globe mentioned General Nelson A. Miles stating, "I am convinced that one aeroplane would annihilate an entire fleet by dropping bombs upon the deck, or the more vital spot--their engine rooms by way of the funnels . . .", and Major General Leonard Wood, commander of the army spoke on how the escalation of airplane technology and the wanted airplane capabilities would be "fulfilled" in the future.

== First use of airplane by military in war is from the United States Aeronautical Reserve ==
Although the U.S.A.R. had much bigger plans for many of their airplanes to be used by the U.S. military, the U.S. military did utilize at least one of their airplanes in a peacekeeping effort with two of the U.S.A.R. members, according to The Air-Scout's March 1911 issue: “On February 16 [1911], the General Staff of the United States Army accepted the service of Mr. Collier’s biplane offered by the U.S.A.R. On the same day, Major General Leonard Wood publicly announced that the craft would be ordered to the Mexican frontier. On the next day, for the first time in the history of man, an airplane was ordered to the scene of the battle, with instructions to patrol the Mexican border in order to preserve neutrality laws. Lieutenant Foulios, a trained United States Army aviator officer, stationed at Fort Sam Houston near San Antonio, Texas, was commanded to report for service on board the airplane. Phillip O. Parmalee, one of the Wright aviators, a lieutenant of the U.S.A.R., native of Michigan, volunteered his services to the government through the reserves which were accepted. He was also commanded to proceed to Texas.” Photos of this were published in The Air-Scout.
