= Industrial Airplane Show =

C. 1911 industrial show in NYC

Coordinates: 40°45′16″N 73°58′27″W

The First Industrial Aeroplane Show, an industrial show, of exhibited full-size airplanes, opened on New Year's Eve 1910 as part of the 11th U.S. International Auto Show at the Grand Central Palace in New York City. The aviation show was organised by the Aero Club of New York. There was much media attention, and local newspapers such as the New York Times and The Brooklyn Daily Eagle covered it for many days. The New York Times reported on January 2, 1911 that "All Palace attendance records were smashed Saturday when over 15,000 persons passed through the doors." The Brooklyn Daily Eagle reported that many spectators bypassed the cars to look at the airplanes. Major General Frederick Dent Grant, USA Department Commander of the East, was one of the main speakers. General Grant attended with three of his aides—Colonel Stephen Mills, General Staff; Captain C.W. Fenton, Second Cavalry; and Marion W. Howze, First Field Artillery. The speakers discussed at the airplane show the possible use of planes for wars, and that the U.S. government should provide funding for airplane research and development. It may have been the first public speech by the military regarding the use of early military aircraft.

Most of the spectators had never seen a full-size airplane before. The Aero Club of New York said to the media that their aim was "to bring under one roof the various machines of domestic and foreign design so as to enable the visitors to the Palace to see the astonishingly rapid advancement made in the field of aeronautics. " A few days before the exhibition The Philadelphia Inquirer published an article predicting that the "Show will be an Eye-Opener" and that "the managers of the International Show at the Grand Central Palace, say that aside from record-breaking attendance of visitors at the exhibition, in connection with which is to be held with the First International Aviation Show, that it will be an eye-opener as a 'Dealer's' Show."

== Airplane displays ==
The full-size airplanes were displayed well, and included machines from the Wright brothers, Lovelace-Thompson, Blériot, Moisant, Burgess Company and Curtiss (Glenn Curtiss), New York's Waldon-Dyott Company monoplane (George Miller Dyott), C. & A. Wittemann (Wittemann brothers) of Staten Island, a Santos-Dumont Demoiselle airplane imported from France, and "A dozen other machines of types, not as well-known, several of them of odd and novel construction". The Brooklyn Daily Eagle reported, "All the evening a crowd gathered around the various types of aeroplanes. The machine that came in for the biggest amount of attention was that with which Johnny Moisant crossed the English Channel. When the news became known that Moisant had been killed at New Orleans, the machine was immediately draped in the colors of mourning." The Burgess Company and Curtiss airplane also drew much attention from the crowd, as it was a 1910 "new model built for Claude Grahame-White, the English winner of the Coupe Internationale d'Aviation ...",

General Frederick Dent Grant discussed the airplane safety issues, and the tragic airplane deaths of Moisant and Archibald Hoxsey with Captain T. T. Lovelace the director of the First Industrial Airplane Show, and with Wright brothers' representative J. Clifford Turpin, according to the New York Times According to the New York Times report, General Grant was pleased with the "comprehensiveness" of the airplane show.

The United States Aeronautical Reserve had an exhibition booth with interesting airplane displays and a demonstration on January 5, 1911 of early wireless communication technology utilizing the "Wilcox aeroplane equipped with [Harry M. Horton|Horton] wireless apparatus" used to communicate from the airplane to the land-based news media and to test distance with steamships out at sea. The Aeronautical Society and the United States Aeronautical Reserve had their full-size airplane displays in the second gallery among other full-size airplanes. Charles W. Chappelle, a member of the United States Aeronautical Reserve, exhibited a full-size airplane which won him a medal for being the only African-American to invent and display an airplane. His airplane design attracted attention and investors. After the industrial show, Chappelle's airplane was displayed at the headquarters of the United States Aeronautical Reserve, 53 Fifth Avenue in Manhattan. Later that year Chappelle helped in the startup founding of the first African-American airplane company, of which he was a vice-president.
