= Charles W. Chappelle =

American businessman (1872–1941)

Charles Ward Chappelle (July 11, 1872 – February 28, 1941) was an early 1900s African-American aviation pioneer and medal winner, electrical engineer, and businessman who was president of the US's African Union Company, Inc., whose mission in the early 1900s was to create small, modernized African cities for blacks with leased land from the Gold Coast of West Africa. Several hundred thousand dollars in capital was raised during that time period for construction and modernization on the Gold Coast through the stock market, and infrastructure metal deals were made with companies such as U.S. Steel. In the beginning of Chappelle's business, he was reported to have made contracts with 82 tribal chiefs in Gold Coast, West Africa, for the exportation of gold, cocoa, rubber, and mahogany. The money was to be used to develop 440 miles with the African Central Railroad and the West Coast Steam and Harbor Company, both African-American and African joint ventures.

== Early life ==
C. W. Chappelle was one of 18 children, born in Eatonton, Georgia, on July 11, 1872, to African Methodist Episcopal Church (A.M.E. church) Reverend George W. Chappelle and Anna Johnson Chappelle. He learned his skills by attending Knox Institute in Georgia, and Morris Brown University in Atlanta, Georgia, and several United States correspondence schools. He started earning wages at the age of 10 through odd jobs such as working in lumber yards, brick and mortar positions. After receiving an education, Chappelle also worked as a school teacher in White Plains, Georgia.

According to the State of Georgia Marriage Certificate (1897), Charles W. Chappelle married "Nita" Blackwell in Georgia, with his father Reverend George W. Chappelle performing the marriage ceremony. U.S. census records (1910) show that Chappelle lived with his wife Nita in Pittsburgh, Pennsylvania, for several years. Later, single again, Chappelle moved to Brooklyn, New York. He traveled to several countries in Africa, starting in 1909, and in 1912, media reports show that he worked in Africa for at least eight more years as president of the African Union Company, Inc.

== International businessman ==
Chappelle was the first head electrician of U.S. Steel, and used his friends there to help the African Union Company, Inc., that had been formed at 1821 Dean Street in Brooklyn, New York, with branches in Cincinnati, Ohio, and the Gold Coast of West Africa. (African Union Company officials included Charles W. Chappelle, president; Joseph L. Jones, secretary; John T. Birch, Treasurer; Directors Gilchrist Stewart, Emmett J. Scott, D. W. Roberts, M. D., George W. Robber, and R. R. Jackson) Additional funding came from minerals such as silver, tin (and other commodities such as mahogany found on the leased African lands) that were exported to the US and Europe. In 1914 the company announced its intention to buy the Charles W. Chappelle Company, said to have a large mahogany concession in the Gold Coast. The land leases usually encompassed about 120 square miles, and were time generous, some offering a 90-plus years contract. This was during a time period when the natural environment was not a main concern. Some leaders on the African continent did not favor the export arrangement as questioning it as depleting Africa of resources and the use of an African American to do so, but overall, Chappelle was received favorably by Africa's black population and leaders.

After Chappelle moved back to Pittsburgh in the 1920s, he was still an active president of the African Union Company, and its Chairman of the Board was Dr. Jay Emmett Scott of the USA's Howard University, Washington, D.C. It was reported in the Savannah Tribune in 1922 that "Charles W. Chappelle has made connections with the U.S. Steel Corporation [year 1922] to the extent of a contract of 100,000 tons of manganese a year for use in their extensive plants. $8,000,000 worth of the finest grades of mahogany [year 1922] are now awaiting shipment to the United States and Europe" and that business was thriving requiring two steamships. Later, while Jay Emmett Scott was chairman of the board of the African Union Company, it was "unable to arrange for shipment of the cocoa to the United States. The loss of this big deal sealed the company's fate. As the company teetered on the edge of bankruptcy in early 1923, Scott struggled to save it. He managed to keep the African Union Company afloat for a few more years, even attracting Robert Lee Vann, the Pittsburgh attorney and newspaper owner, to assume control of the company's legal affairs. By 1930, though, the African Union Company was defunct." The exact circumstances of why the African Union Company had problems in the shipment of cocoa (cocoa bean) from Africa to the United States in the late 1920s seems to be so far unknown, and the African Union Company going out of business does coincide just before or during the beginning year of the Great Depression in U.S. history.

== African-American aviation pioneer ==
C.W. Chappelle's successfully designed a long-distance airplane. He won a medal for being the only African-American to invent and display an airplane at the spectacular 1911 First Industrial Airplane Show held in conjunction with the U.S. International Auto Show at Manhattan's Grand Central Palace in New York City. His airplane invention was written about in several of the African-American media; one foreign Ghana newspaper described it as a quadruplane, and others just wrote about the excitement of there being an African-American airplane inventor and taking a place in the history of aviation. The event had a host of the well-established attending and speaking, and was covered by the media for two weeks, and his airplane invention was an excitement for the African-American community. In a May 1911 issue of The Crises: A Record of the Darker Races, Social Uplift (p. 7) published by the National Association of Colored People (NAACP) in New York City, there is a brief mention of C.W. Chappelle and his aviation invention.

In 1911, the first African-American airplane company was formed in Manhattan's New York City, at the then West 53rd Street Hotel Macco with $10,000.00 capital, and Chappelle was its vice president, other board members were Louis A. Leavelle (president); Benjamin F. Thomas treasurer; Lee A. Pollard (secretary); and directors Harrison M. Steward; John Bryant; and Dr. V. T. Thomas.

Chappelle was a member of the United States Aeronautical Reserve, and he was mentioned in its official magazine The Air-Scout in December 1910 that read that Chappelle "has invented an aeroplane embodying some very interesting features; especially equipped with safety devices for long distance passenger carrying flights . . ." and that his airplane would be on display at the United States Aeronautical Reserve headquarters in Manhattan.

== Other activities ==
While Chappelle lived in Brooklyn, New York, in the early 1900s, he also worked as an architect and contractor in Brooklyn, where he erected several buildings.

While he traveled and lived in several United States cities, and African countries, his main United States residence was in Pittsburgh, Pennsylvania, where he returned to in 1920, and was employed by the city's department of lands and buildings. He was an active member of the Bethesda Presbyterian Church.

Chappelle died in 1941 in Pittsburgh, Pennsylvania.
