= Harriet Quimby =

American aviation pioneer (1875–1912)

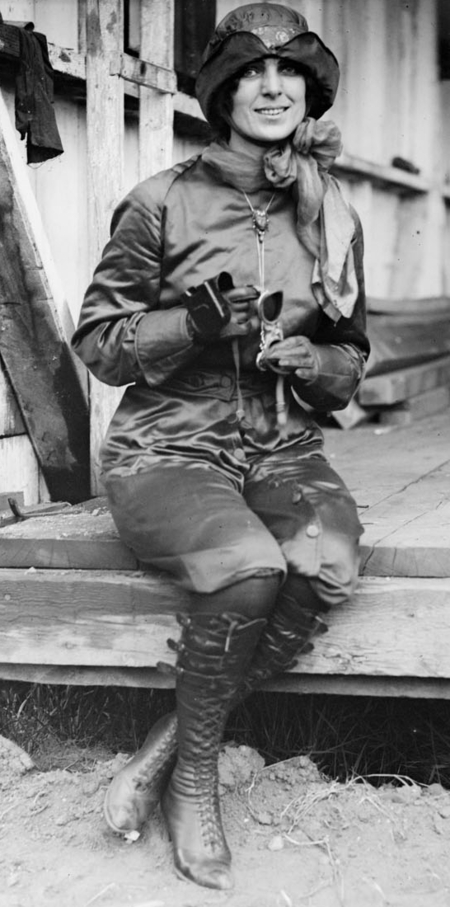
- Harriet Quimby in 1911
- Born: May 11, 1875; Arcadia, Michigan, US
- Died: July 1, 1912 (aged 37); Squantum, Massachusetts, US
- Aviation career
- First flight: Blériot XI monoplane
- Famous flights: English Channel overfly (Dover, England to Calais, France)
- Flight license: August 1, 1911; Aero Club of America, US

Harriet Quimby (May 11, 1875 – July 1, 1912) was an American pioneering aviator, journalist, and film screenwriter. In 1911, she became the first woman in the United States to receive a pilot's license and in 1912 the first woman to fly solo across the English Channel. Although Quimby flew for only one year and died at the age of 37 in a flying accident, she strongly influenced the role of women in aviation.

== Early life and early career ==
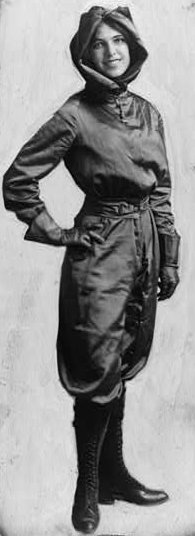
Photograph of Quimby in 1911 by Theodore C. Marceau

Harriet Quimby was born on May 11, 1875, in Michigan, to Ursula (née Cook) and William Quimby. With no official birth certificate, her exact place of birth is not known, and many communities in Michigan have claimed to be her birthplace, among them Coldwater and Arcadia Township.

Her father had purchased a farm in Arcadia Township in 1874, where the family was recorded as residing in the 1880 United States Census. They moved to Arroyo Grande, California, between 1887 and 1890. After her family moved to San Francisco, California, in the early 1900s, Quimby initially tried her hand at stage acting, using the stage name "Hazel Quimby". She is known to have appeared in at least two plays: as Romeo in a production of Romeo and Juliet opposite Linda Arvidson's Juliet (before Arvidson married film director D.W. Griffith), and a minor role in a production of Sappho. Ultimately concluding that acting was not for her, Quimby chose to pursue a career in journalism.

In 1902, Quimby began writing for the San Francisco Dramatic Review as well as contributing to the Sunday editions of the San Francisco Chronicle and San Francisco Call.

In 1903, she moved to Manhattan, New York City to work as a theater critic for Leslie's Illustrated Weekly. She published more than 250 articles over a nine-year period.

== Aviation ==
Quimby became interested in aviation in 1910 when she attended the International Aviation Meet at Belmont Park in Elmont, New York. There, she met John Moisant, a well-known aviator and operator of a flight school. Quimby learned to fly at the Moisant Aviation School, where Alfred Moisant, John Moisant's brother, was her flight instructor.

On August 2, 1911, Quimby passed her pilot's test and became the first North American woman to earn a pilot's license, receiving Fédération Aéronautique Internationale certificate No. 37, (Note: The world's first licensed female pilot was European Raymonde de Laroche) issued by the Aero Club of America (ACA). She completed the requirements after 33 flight lessons and two test flights. Her flight instructor's sister, Matilde Moisant, earned her pilot's license shortly thereafter, becoming the second American woman to do so.

After earning her pilot's license, Quimby acted to capitalize on her new status. The press called her the "Dresden China Aviatrix" or "China Doll", because of her petite stature and fair skin. Pilots could earn as much as US$1,000 per performance, and prize money for a race could go as high as $10,000 or more. Quimby joined the Moisant International Aviators, an exhibition team, and made her professional debut in 1911, earning $1,500 in a night flight over Staten Island before a crowd of almost 20,000 spectators.

As one of the country's few female pilots, she capitalized on her femininity by wearing a plum-colored satin blouse, necklace, and antique bracelet, with more practical trousers and high-laced boots. She drew crowds whenever she competed in cross-country meets and races. As part of the exhibition team, Quimby showcased her talents around the United States and traveled to Mexico City at the end of 1911 to participate in aviation activities held in honor of the inauguration of President Francisco I. Madero.

Quimby continued her work as a writer for Leslie's while touring with airshows. She documented her flying experiences in a series of articles, serving as the publication's aviation editor. Ironically, one of the first articles published under her new title was "The Dangers of Flying and How to Avoid Them," an account of pilots who had died and a discussion of the need for proper safety precautions. Despite her knowledge of the risks, and committed to her new passion of flying, she promoted the economic potential of commercial aviation and touted flying as an ideal sport for women.

== Hollywood ==
In 1911 Quimby also wrote seven screenplays or scenarios that were developed as silent film shorts by Biograph Studios. All seven were directed by D. W. Griffith. Stars in her films included Florence La Badie, Wilfred Lucas, and Blanche Sweet. Quimby had a small acting role in one movie.

== Vin Fiz ==
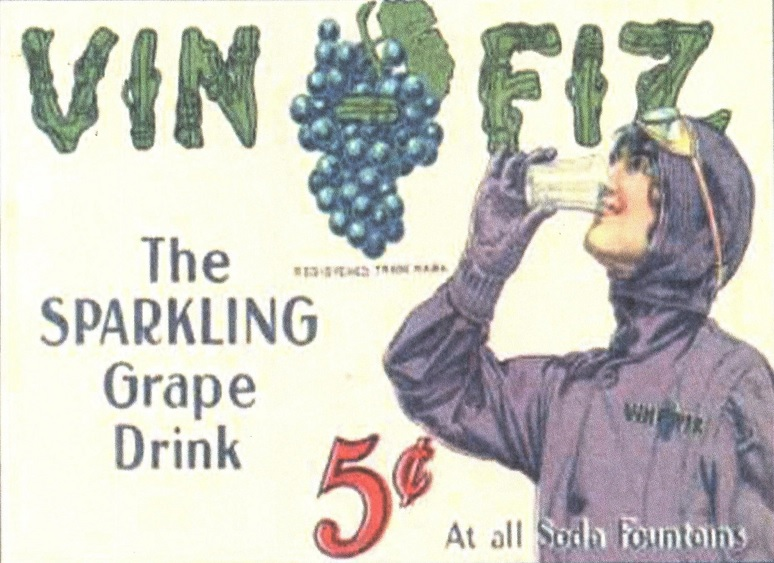
Vin Fiz soda 1912 postcard

The Vin Fiz Company, a division of Armour Meat Packing Plant of Chicago, used Quimby to advertise the new grape soda, Vin Fiz, after the death of Calbraith Perry Rodgers (Note: Rodgers was the first pilot to fly across the continental USA. The aircraft was the Vin Fiz flyer) in an aviation accident in April 1912. She appeared in advertisements in her distinctive purple aviator uniform.

== English Channel flight ==
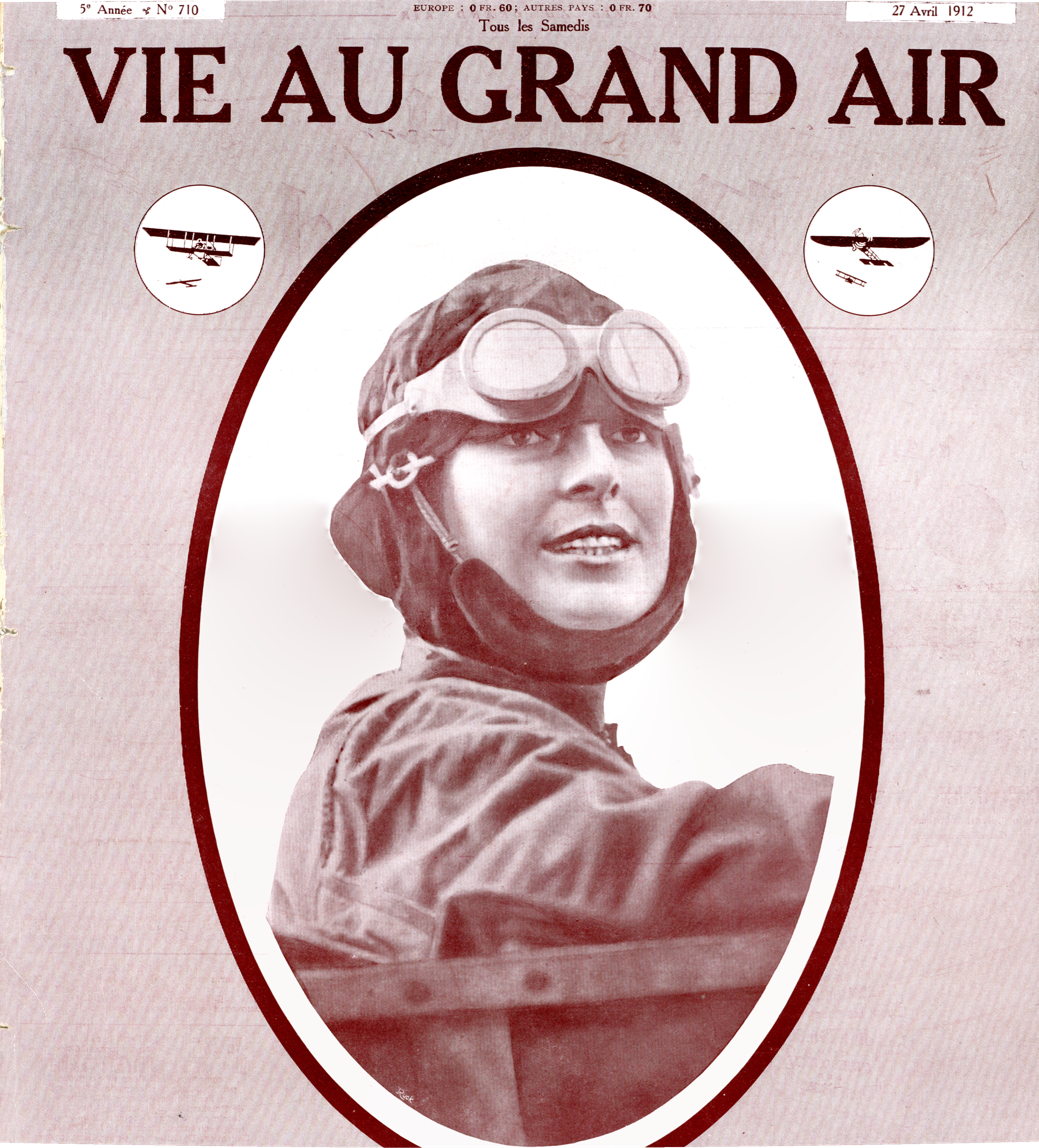
La Vie au Grand Air cover (April 27, 1912) featuring aviator Harriet Quimby. She wears a silk flying suit and hooded hat tailored by O. Ström & Fils (Ström Paris) for her historic English Channel flight.

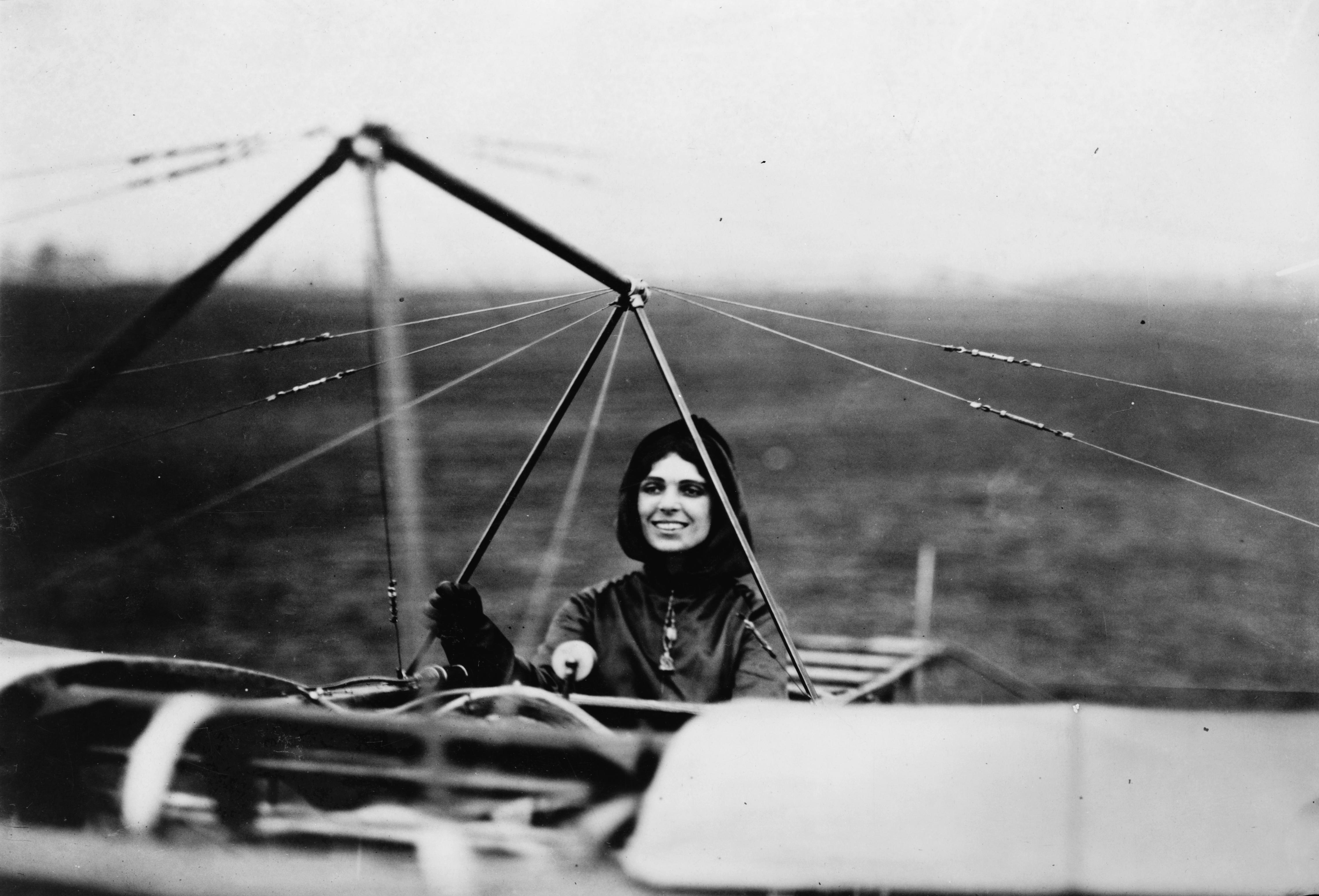
Quimby in her Blériot XI monoplane

Matilde Moisant (left) and Harriet Quimby, the first two women in the United States to obtain pilot certificates (photo c. 1911–1912)

In March 1912 it was reported in Flight that Quimby was coming to Europe hoping to compete against French female pilots and to find a "fast monoplane" to compete in Chicago the following year. She agreed with Leslies for rights to the story and with the British newspaper The Daily Mirror sponsorship in exchange for exclusivity in the UK.

To make a flight across the English Channel she purchased a 50-hp Gnome-engined Bleriot monoplane in March. The machine was delivered from France on the Saturday before the planned flight and a test flight made by Gustav Hamel (Note: Hamel, who had learnt to fly at Bleriot's school had flown the first female passenger across the Channel on 2 April 1912 as part of a flight from Hendon, London to Issy, Paris) on that Sunday. Quimby was staying in Dover under an assumed name. A few friends including Norbert Chereau (manager of Hendon’s Blériot School), Linda Griffith (as she was now) and Carrie Vanderbilt together with reporters, photographers and a Gaumont cinematographic company film crew attended the start of the attempt. On Tuesday April 16, 1912 Hamel took it up for a preliminary flight then at 5:38 pm on April 16, 1912, Quimby took off from Dover, England on a course to Cape Grinez flying at around 2,000 ft. After 59 minutes flying she landed about 25 miles (40 km) from Calais on a beach in Équihen-Plage, Pas-de-Calais "not far from Bleriot's sheds". She was the first woman to pilot an aircraft across the English Channel.

Brian Flood, chairman of the Dover Transport Museum Society said to the BBC "Her instrumentation consisted of a watch and a hand-held compass, and pilot comfort entirely in the hot water bottle she had strapped to her middle." .

Her accomplishment received little media attention however as it occurred the day after news broke of the sinking of the Titanic ocean liner on April 15. According to the Smithsonian "She became an instant sensation and returned triumphantly to the U.S."

== Death ==
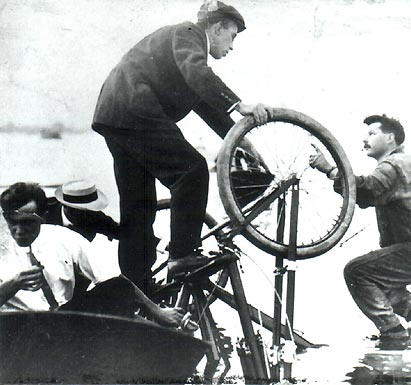
A group of men, including Harriet Quimby's flight mechanic (right), examine her downed airplane. It glided on its own into Dorchester Bay and flipped over in the mud.

On July 1, 1912, Quimby flew in the Third Harvard-Boston Air Meet at the Harvard Aviation Field at Squantum Point, Quincy, Massachusetts. Although she had obtained her ACA certificate to participate in ACA events, the Boston meet was an unsanctioned contest. Quimby flew out to the Boston Light lighthouse in Boston Harbor at about 3,000 feet (900 m), then returned and circled the airfield.

William A. P. Willard, the event organizer and father of aviator Charles F. Willard, was a passenger in her brand-new two-seat Blériot XI monoplane. At an altitude of 1,000 feet (300 m), the aircraft unexpectedly pitched forward for reasons unknown and Willard was ejected. Unable to rebalance the plane, Quimby was also ejected. Both fell to their deaths, while the unpiloted plane "glided down and lodged itself in the mud," flipping over. (Note: Ironically, less than a month before her death, Quimby had written about the development of a harness designed to prevent pilots from falling out of their aircraft)

Harriet Quimby died at age 37 and was buried in the Woodlawn Cemetery in The Bronx, New York. The following year her remains were moved to the Kensico Cemetery in Valhalla, New York.

== Filmography ==
As actress
Title	Year	Role	Director
Lines of White on a Sullen Sea	1909	Fishermaiden	D. W. Griffith
The Late Harriet Quimby's Flight Across the English Channel	1912	Self	Unknown

As writer
Title	Year	Director
Sunshine Through the Dark	1911	D.W. Griffith
The Blind Princess and the Poet	1911	D.W. Griffith
His Mother's Scarf	1911	D.W. Griffith
The Broken Cross	1911	D. W. Griffith
Fisher Folks	1911	D. W. Griffith

== Legacy ==
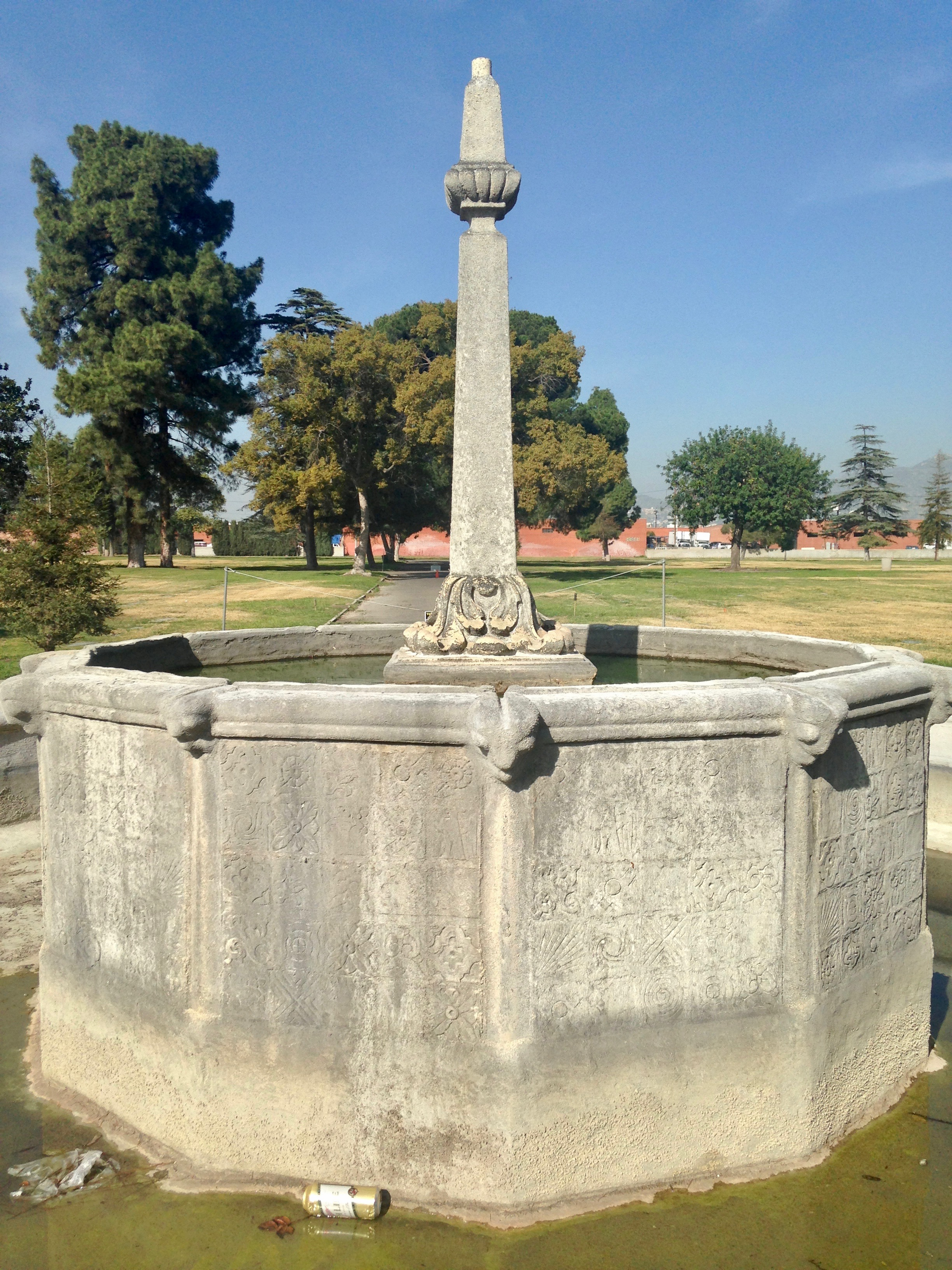
Compass rose cenotaph fountain dedicated to Quimby at Pierce Brothers Valhalla Cemetery in North Hollywood

A cenotaph to Quimby, the Harriet Quimby Compass Rose Fountain, was erected at Pierce Brothers/Valhalla Memorial Park Cemetery in Burbank, California. It is located close to the cemetery's Portal of the Folded Wings, a shrine containing the ashes of aviation pioneers.

In 1991 the United States Postal Service issued a 50 cent airmail postage stamp featuring Harriet Quimby. Written on these stamps was "Harriet Quimby: Pioneer Pilot."

She is memorialized in two official Michigan historical markers. One is located near Coldwater. The other was erected near the now abandoned family farmhouse in Arcadia Township where Quimby lived from 1875 to about 1888.

In 2004 Quimby was inducted into the National Aviation Hall of Fame.

In 2012 Quimby was inducted into the Long Island Air and Space Hall of Fame.

The Old Rhinebeck Aerodrome possesses a flyable Anzani-powered one-seater Blériot XI, which bears the Blériot factory's serial number 56, showing that it was manufactured in 1909. Since Quimby's plane that she flew in 1912 was a brand new two-seater, the idea that the former was the aircraft that she was flying at the time of her death seems to be an urban legend.

Quimby Road at Reid–Hillview Airport in San Jose, California, is named in her honor. There are also streets named after her in Baton Rouge, Louisiana (near its airport), Saint-Laurent, Quebec (a suburb of Montreal) and Opfikon, Switzerland.

== Film and television portrayals ==
In 2015, American media reported that plans were under way for a biographical film entitled Aeroplane Angel that would dramatize Quimby's life. As of 2024, no production has as yet eventuated.

== See also ==
- Raymonde de Laroche, first woman to be issued a pilot's license
- List of firsts in aviation
