= John Moisant =

American businessman, revolutionary, and aviation pioneer (1868–1910)

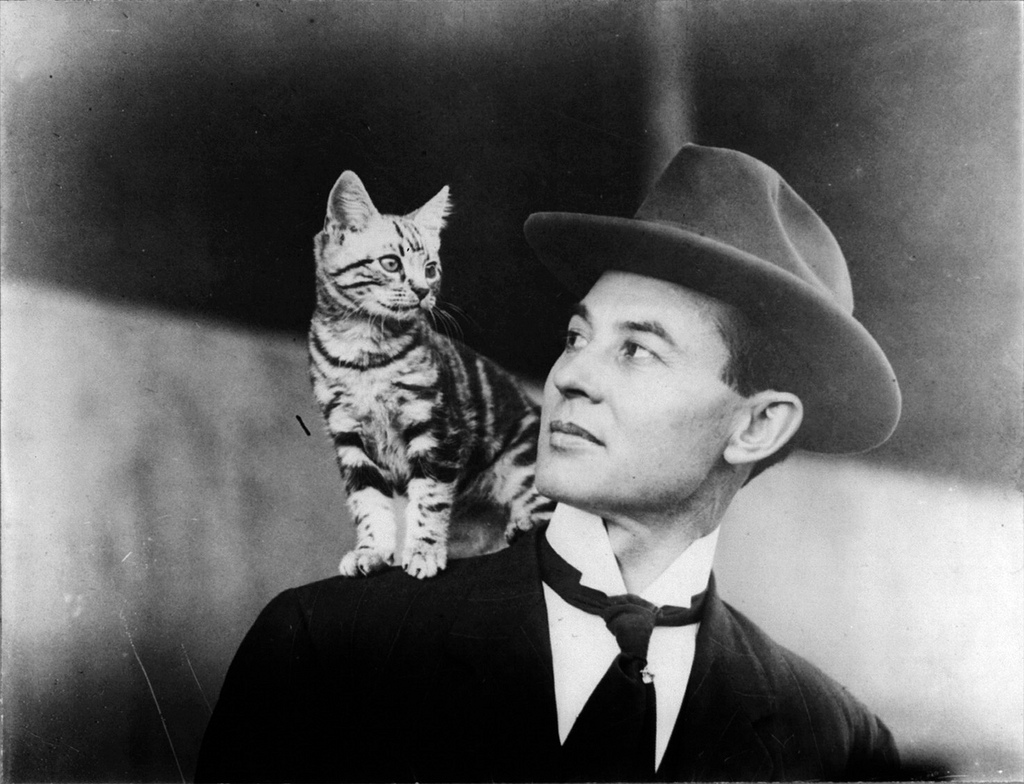
- Moisant and his cat, Mademoiselle Fifi, in 1910
- Born: John Bevins Moisant; April 25, 1868; Kankakee, Illinois, U.S.
- Died: December 31, 1910 (aged 42); Harahan, Louisiana, U.S.
- Occupation: Aviator

John Bevins Moisant (April 25, 1868 – December 31, 1910) was an American aviator, aeronautical engineer, flight instructor, businessman, and revolutionary. He was the first pilot to conduct passenger flights over a city (Paris), as well as across the English Channel, from Paris to London. He co-founded an eponymous flying circus, the Moisant International Aviators.

Moisant funded his aviation career with proceeds from business ventures in El Salvador, where he had led two failed revolutions and coup attempts against President Figueroa in 1907 and 1909.

Only months after becoming a pilot, Moisant died after being ejected from his airplane over a field just west of New Orleans, Louisiana, where he was competing for the 1910 Michelin Cup. The site of his crash is the location of Louis Armstrong New Orleans International Airport, which was originally named Moisant Field in his memory.

== Early life ==
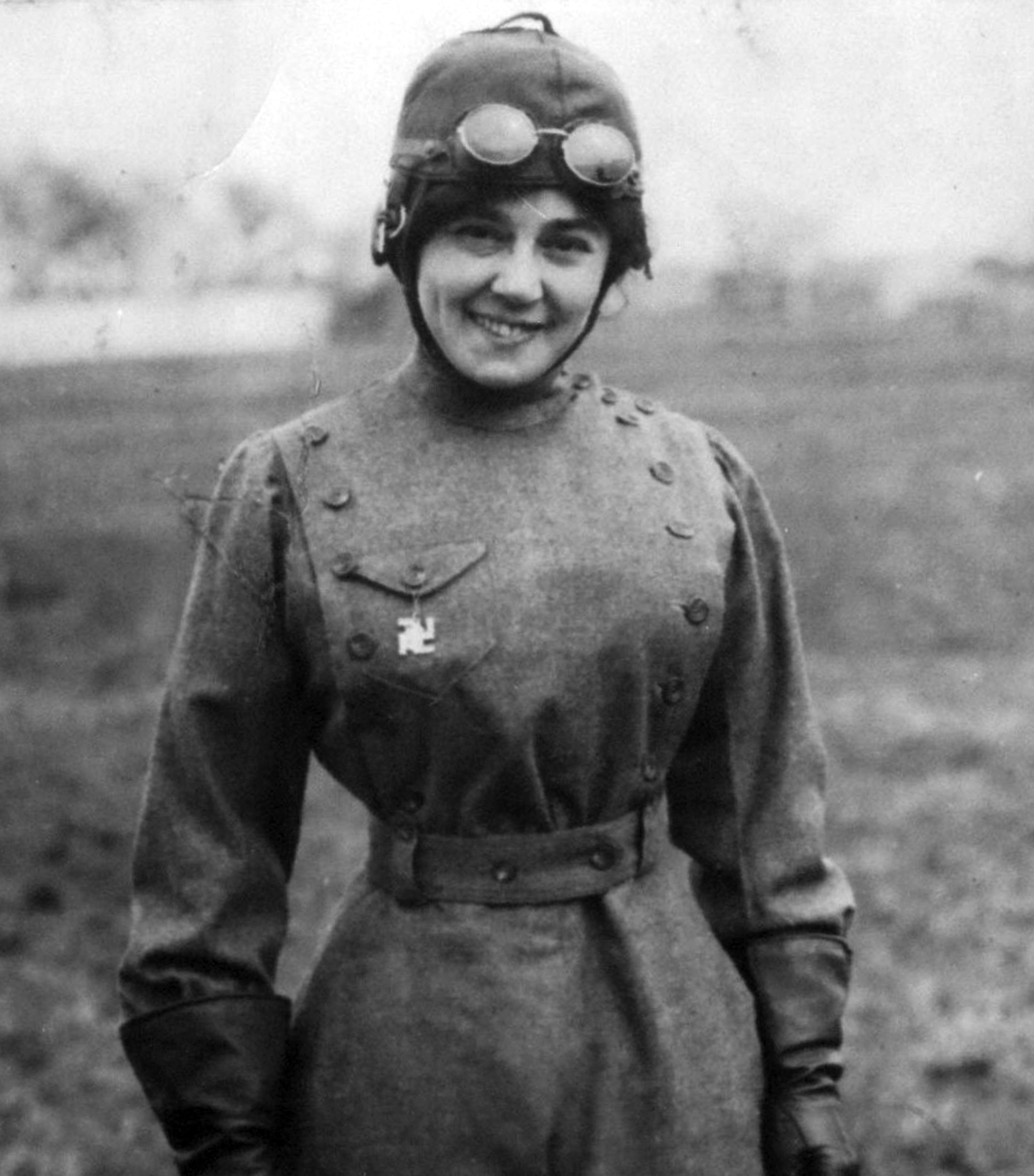
Matilde Moisant, his sister, in flying gear in 1912

He was born in L'Erable, Illinois to Medard Moisant (1838–1887) of St-Cyprien-de-Léry and Josephine Fortier (1841–1901). Both parents were French-Canadian immigrants. His siblings include: Alfred J. Moisant (1862–1929) who founded a flying school; George Moisant (1866–1927); Ann Marguerite Moisant (1877–1957); Matilde Moisant (1878–1964) who was taught to fly by Alfred in and was the second American woman to receive her pilot's license (after Harriet Quimby who was another pupil of Alfred); Louisa Josephine Moisant (1882–1957); and possibly Eunice Moisant (1890–?) who was born in Illinois.

In 1880, the family was living in Manteno, Illinois and Moisant's father was working as a farmer. In the late 1880s, after the death of Moisant's father, the family moved to Alameda, California.

== El Salvador ==
He and his brothers moved to El Salvador in 1896 and bought sugarcane plantations that generated a substantial sum for the family. In 1909, José Santos Zelaya, president of Nicaragua, asked John to go to France to investigate airplanes.

== Aviation career ==
=== Early aeronautical engineering ===
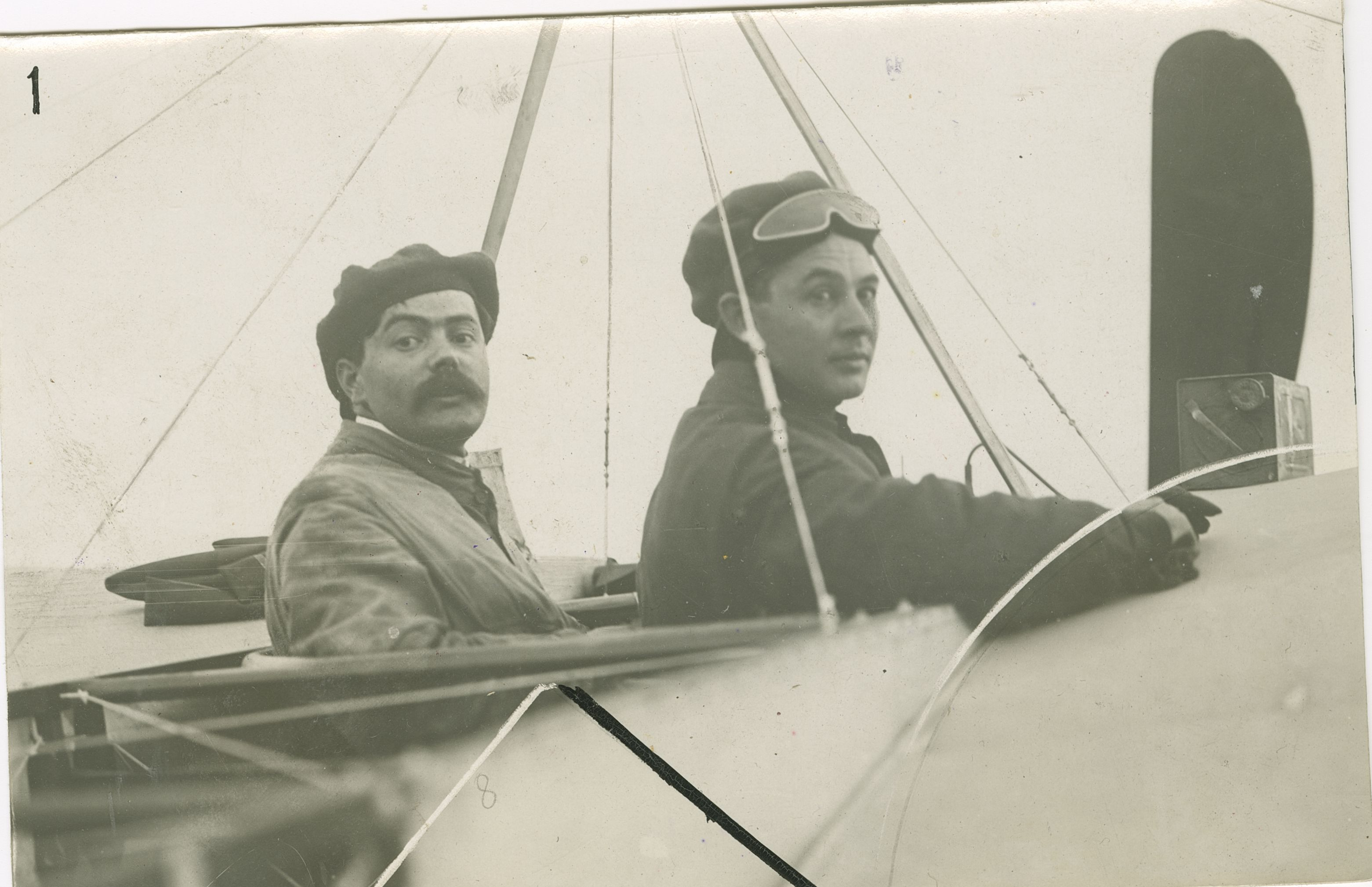
John Moisant before 1910

John Moisant entered the aviation field in 1909 as a hobby, after attending the Grande Semaine d'Aviation de la Champagne air show in Reims, France in August 1909. He designed and built two aircraft between August 1909 and 1910, before he became an officially licensed pilot. His first was the Moisant Biplane, alternatively known as "L'Ecrevisse", which he had built in Issy-les-Moulineaux, Paris, France. This experimental aircraft constructed entirely from aluminum and steel by workers hired by Moisant from Clément-Bayard was the first all-metal aircraft in the world. This aircraft was completed in February 1910; the Moisant biplane's inaugural flight, and Moisant's first flight, ultimately resulted in a crash after ascending only 90 feet with limited airtime.

Moisant's second project, begun in January 1910, resulted in the Moisant Monoplane, alternatively known as "Le Corbeau", which was partially built out of the wreckage of L'Ecrevisse. The alternative design had difficulty staying upright on the ground and was never flown.

=== Training in France ===
In the spring of 1910, Moisant took four flying lessons at the Blériot School, headed by Louis Blériot, in Pau, Pyrénées-Atlantiques, France, beginning his short but distinguished flying career. Later, Moisant was granted a pilot's license from the Aéro-Club de France, which he transferred to the Aero Club of America to become the thirteenth registered pilot in the United States.

=== Significant flights and aviation records ===
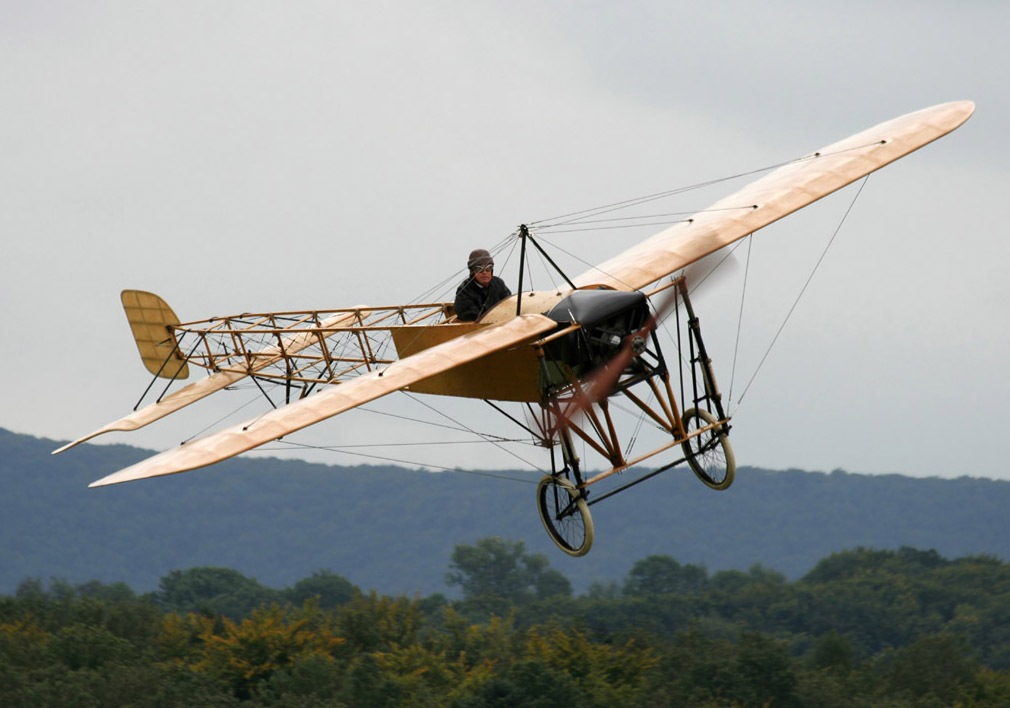
A renovated version of a Blériot XI, John Moisant's French-built aircraft of choice

On August 9, 1910, Moisant flew his third flight as a pilot in his first recently purchased Blériot XI from Étampes to Issy-les-Moulineaux over Paris, landing the aircraft at the starting line of the Le Circuit de l'Est aerial time trial circuit. Accompanying Moisant as a passenger on the flight was his mechanic, making the trip the first passenger flight over a city in the world. At the time Moisant was still considered a novice pilot and had been previously denied entry into Le Circuit de l'Est competition by the Aéro-Club de France. That same day, he followed this performance with an encore, flying over Paris again with Roland Garros, who would become a future member of the Moisant International Aviators flying circus, as his passenger.

On August 17, 1910, he flew the first flight with a passenger across the English Channel. His passengers on the flight were Albert Fileux, his mechanic, and his cat, Mademoiselle Fifi. This feat was accomplished on Moisant's sixth flight as a pilot.

=== Competitive events ===
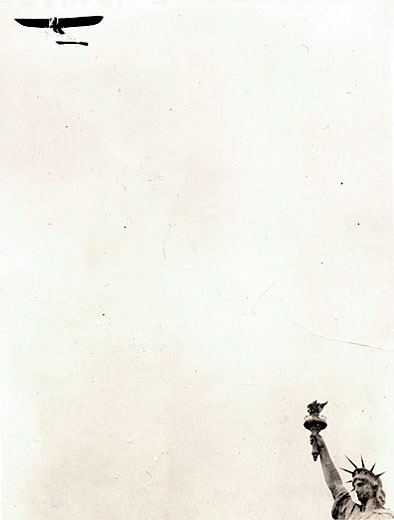
Moisant as seen in flight in his Blériot XI competing in the International Aviation Meet at Belmont Park, October 30, 1910

At the International Aviation Meet at Belmont Park, New York, John Moisant flew his Blériot XI around a marker balloon 10 miles (16 kilometers) away, and returned to the racetrack in only 39 minutes, winning an $850 prize. After this initial competition, Moisant collided his brake-less Blériot into another aircraft while both were taxiing, causing it to flip over, but had repairs completed in time for the next event. On October 30, 1910, at the same show, he competed in a race to fly around the Statue of Liberty. He won the race, beating Claude Grahame-White, a British aviator, by 42.75 seconds. However, he was later disqualified because officials ruled that he had started late. The $10,000 prize later went to Count Jacques de Lesseps not Grahame-White, because the latter had fouled during the race.

On December 30, 1910, in New Orleans, he raced his Blériot XI five miles (eight kilometers) against a Packard automobile, but lost.

Year	Date	Competition name	Competition type	Location	Placing	Winnings	Description
1910	August 9–11	Le Circuit de l'Est	Time Trial Circuit	Jarville-la-Malgrange, Meurthe-et-Moselle, Lorraine, France	DNC	0 USD	Moisant's application to the competition was denied, as he had only completed two flights (one of which was in his own aircraft) at the time of the application.
1910	October 29	International Aviation Meet at Belmont Park	Time Trial Circuit, Gordon Bennett Cup	Belmont Park, New York	2nd	US$5,800*	Finished with a time of 1 h 57 min 44.85 s
1910	October 30	International Aviation Meet at Belmont Park	Air Race	Belmont Park, New York	DQ	US$5,800*	Initially finished in first with a time of 34 minutes, 38.4 seconds. *However, Moisant was later disqualified due to the failure to meet a rule that required one hour of flight time before the race.
1910	October 31	International Aviation Meet at Belmont Park	Distance Event	Belmont Park, New York	1st	US$5,800*	Completed 56 laps.
1910	December 31	Michelin Cup	Endurance Flight	City Park, New Orleans, Louisiana	DNS	0 USD	Thrown from his plane while flying to the races starting point at Harahan.

=== Entrepreneurship: the Moisant International Aviators ===
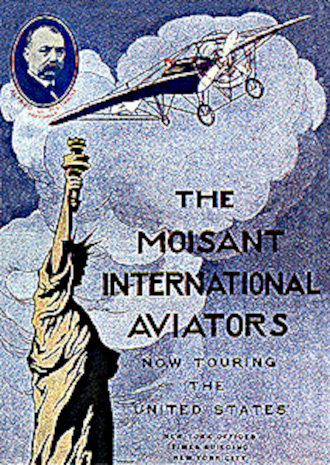
Moisant International Aviators

With his brother, Alfred Moisant, he formed the Moisant International Aviators, a flying circus which went barnstorming around the United States, Mexico, and Cuba. Initially, John Moisant was one of the pilots in the exhibitions, along with Charles K. Hamilton, Rene Simon, Rene Barrier, J.J. Frisbie, C. Audemars, and Roland Garros.

== Death ==
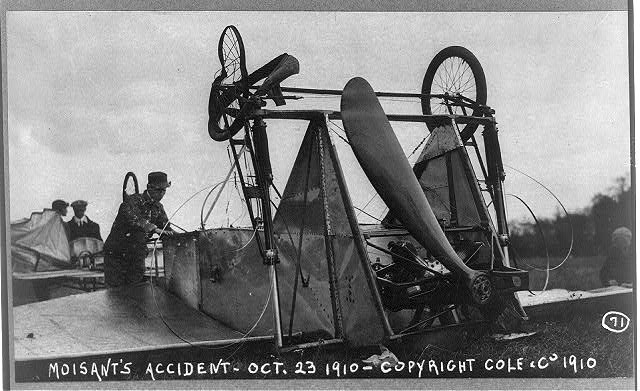
A plane Moisant crashed in a taxiing collision on October 23, 1910

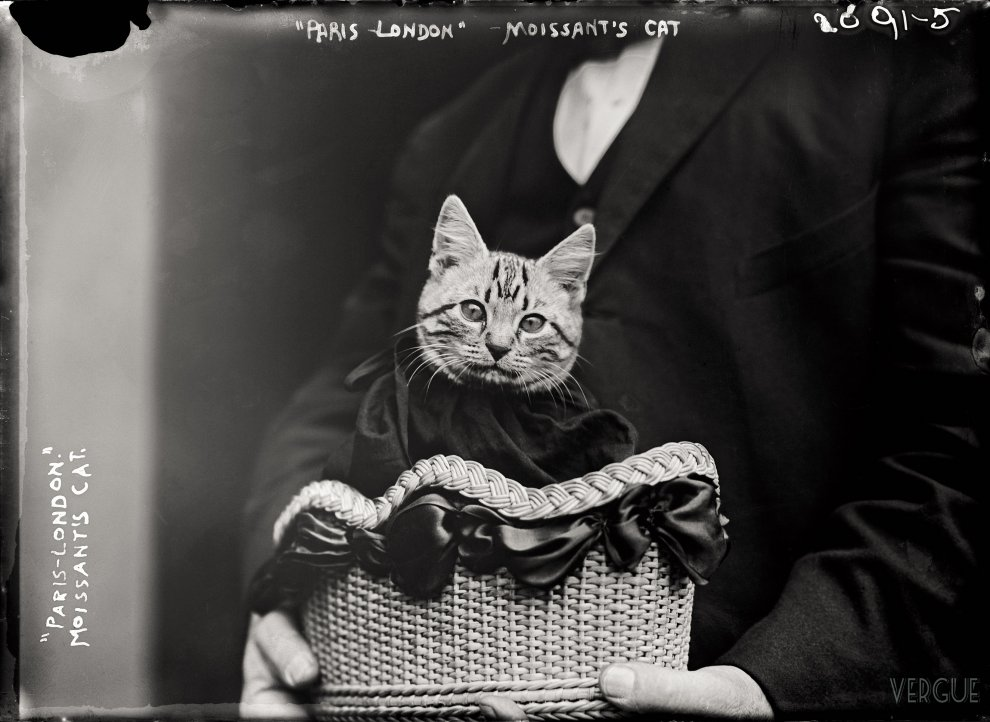
Mme Fifi in mourning at the funeral of John Moisant

Moisant died on the morning of December 31, 1910, in an air crash near Harahan, Louisiana. He was making a preparatory flight in his attempt to win the 1910 Michelin Cup and its $4,000 prize (equivalent to $138,214 in 2025) for the longest sustained flight of the year. While attempting to land at an airfield in Harahan, located about 4 miles (6.4 km) from the New Orleans city limits, Moisant was caught in a gust of wind and thrown from his Blériot XI monoplane in view of a crowd of spectators. He fell about 25 feet (7.6 m) to the ground and landed on his head, breaking his neck. Apparently still alive, Moisant's body was hurriedly placed aboard a nearby railroad car and driven into the city, where he was then pronounced dead. The crash was later blamed on a "loss of equilibrium caused by an extra load of gasoline, placed aboard the plane for the endurance flight." Fellow aviator Arch Hoxsey died the same day in a similar crash in Los Angeles.

John Moisant was buried at the Valhalla Memorial Park Cemetery in Los Angeles, California. His body was later moved to the Portal of Folded Wings Shrine to Aviation, also in Los Angeles.

== Legacy ==
"Nine-tenths confidence and one-tenth common sense equals [a] successful aviator."

— John B. Moisant, How to Fly: The Flyer's Manual, 1917

John Moisant was one of the first to advocate for monoplanes with one set of fixed wings. Additionally, he believed in the potential of the use of aircraft in armed conflict.

Moisant's touring show was among the first in aviation, and one of the first to introduce Americans to airplanes.

=== Cessna ===
Among the people influenced by Moisant's exhibitions was aviation pioneer Clyde Cessna, who saw the Moisant troupe's 1911 performance in Oklahoma City. Cessna helped uncrate and assemble, then disassemble and re-crate, a Blériot XI monoplane used in the show. From his memory of that activity, Cessna built his first airplane—the first airplane built and flown successfully on the Great Plains by a resident... and the first of hundreds of thousands of airplanes, worldwide, that would bear the "Cessna" name.

Cessna would become one of the United States' first major advocates of monoplanes, carrying forward Moisant's support of the then-controversial concept.

According to some historical accounts (reportedly later disputed by Cessna, himself), Cessna went to the Queen Aeroplane Company in New York, and worked in their factory for a month, learning the art of construction of Bleriot-type monoplanes. According to these accounts, when Moisant was killed, Cessna purchased a Queen/Bleriot fuselage that was being assembled at the Queen factory for Moisant—and that became the basis for Cessna's first airplane.

=== Moisant Field ===
The international airport of New Orleans, Louisiana was originally named Moisant Field in his honor, though it has since been renamed Louis Armstrong New Orleans International Airport. The airport retains its "MSY" identifier, thought to be derived from "Moisant Stock Yards", and is located in suburban Kenner, only a few miles from the field where Moisant's fatal airplane crash occurred.
