= Squantum Point Park =

Park in Quincy, Massachusetts

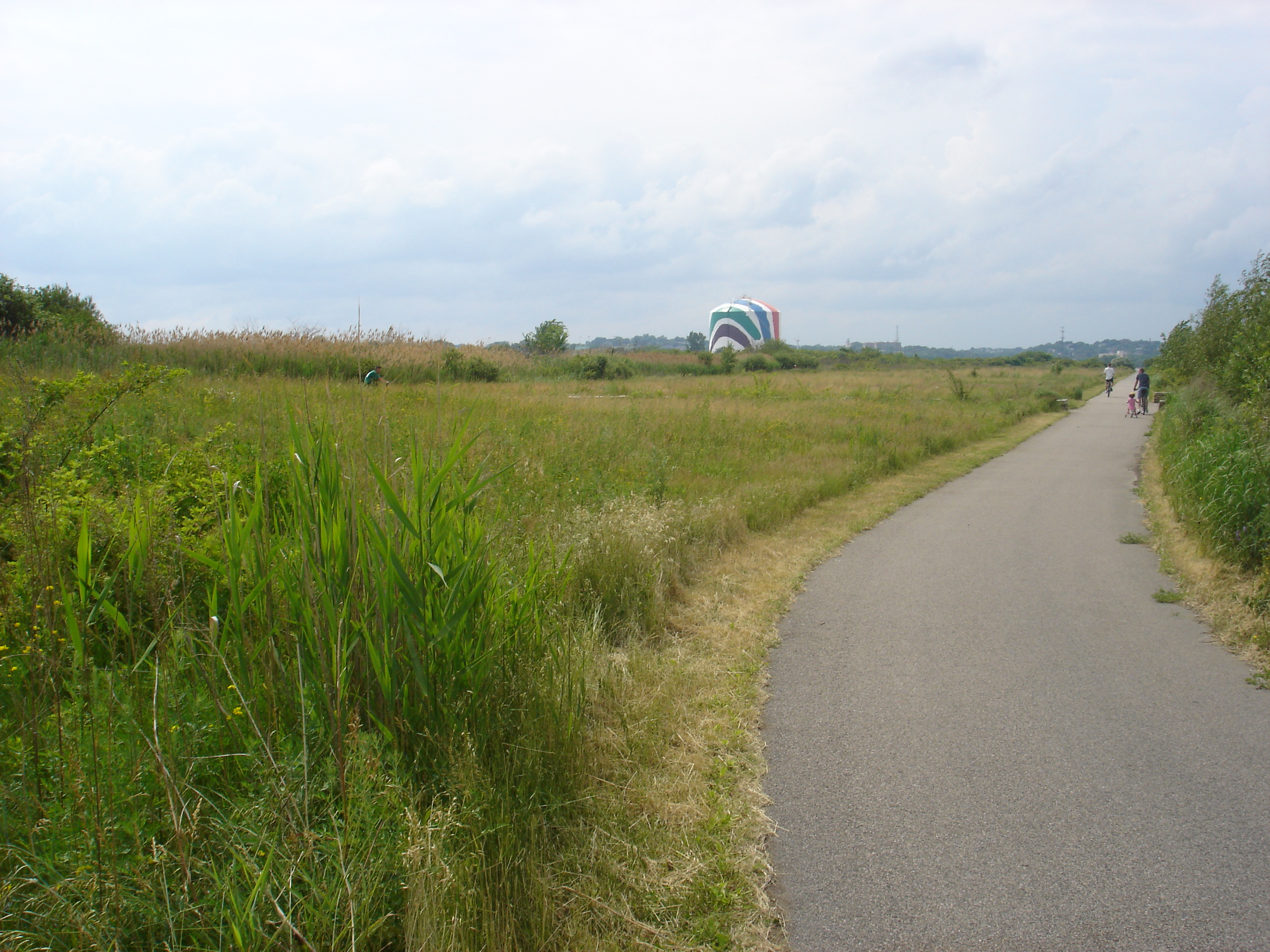

- Location within Greater Boston area Location within Massachusetts Location within the United States
- Location: Quincy, Massachusetts, United States
- Coordinates: 42°18′00″N 71°02′20″W
- Area: 46 acres (19 ha)
- Elevation: 10 ft (3.0 m)
- Established: 2001
- Administrator: Massachusetts Department of Conservation and Recreation
- Website: Official website

Squantum Point Park is a state-owned, public recreation area located on the Squantum peninsula of Quincy, Massachusetts, United States. The park was created on the site of the former Harvard Aviation Field and Squantum Naval Air Station, which is preserved in a 2,700-foot-long (820 m) strip of runway, and the former dockworks of the Bethlehem Shipbuilding Corporation. The park is managed by the Massachusetts Department of Conservation and Recreation and is associated with the development of the Neponset River Reservation.

== Activities and amenities ==
The park provides views of the Boston skyline and opportunities for picnicking, canoeing, bird watching, and shoreline fishing as well as paths for running and in-line skating. It is the eastern terminus of the Quincy RiverWalk, a 2-mile trail along the Quincy side of the Neponset River Estuary, and sits at the eastern end of the Neponset River Greenway.
