= Charles F. Willard =

American aviator (1883–1977)

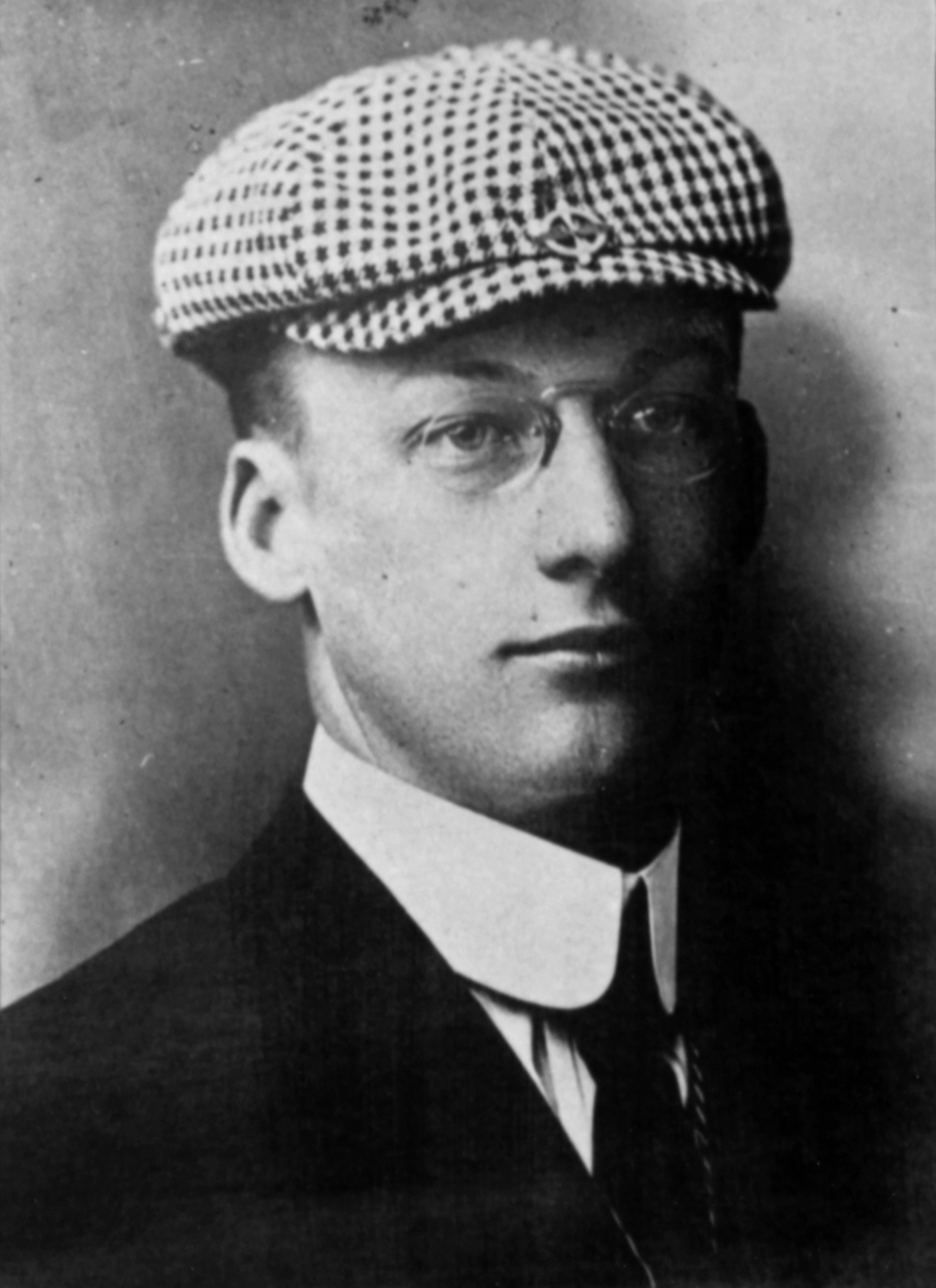
- Willard in 1910
- Born: Charles Foster Willard; October 13, 1883; Melrose, Massachusetts, U.S.
- Died: February 1, 1977 (aged 93); Glendale, California, U.S.
- Occupations: Aviator, engineer, explorer
- Known for: First barnstormer (1909); Fourth American pilot of an airplane (1909); First person to fly three passengers in the United States (1910); First person to be shot down in an airplane (1910)

Charles Foster Willard (October 13, 1883 – February 1, 1977) was an American aviator and engineer, who became known as the first barnstormer with his trick flights. Willard was the first person taught to fly by Glenn Curtiss in 1909 and was the 10th person to receive an official pilot's licence. Willard made a number of aviation 'firsts'.

In 1910, Willard made the first ever flight over downtown Los Angeles. He was the first person to fly three passengers in the United States. Willard has the unfortunate record of being the first person to have his airplane shot out of the sky by a bullet—that of an annoyed farmer who hit his propeller with a squirrel gun.

At the Harvard-Boston Aero Meet of 1910 Charles Willard took Miss Eleanor Ladd of Boston on a flight. She worked for a Boston newspaper, and was reportedly the first newspaper woman in America to fly in an airplane.

During the aviation meet, Willard also took along Army Lieutenant Jacob E. Finkel, a sharpshooter, up in his airplane. As Willard circled the airfield, Finkel fired a rifle at targets on the ground, hitting them often. The "experiment" was considered "highly satisfactory".

With aviation pioneer Stanley Yale Beach, Willard built the Beach-Willard Monoplane, which had a rectangular frame in the front tapering to a triangular frame in the rear. At the time, Beach had French, English, and American patents related to the connection of wings to a triangular body.

Willard's father, William A. Willard, was killed at the Third Harvard-Boston Air Meet (his father was the event organiser) on July 1, 1912 after falling from Harriet Quimby's Blériot monoplane when it pitched forward suddenly. Unable to stabilize the aircraft, Quimby was ejected shortly afterwards and also killed.

== Gallery ==
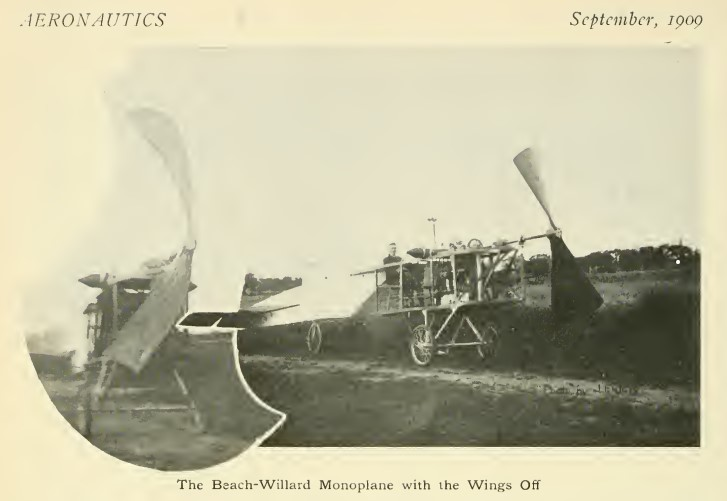

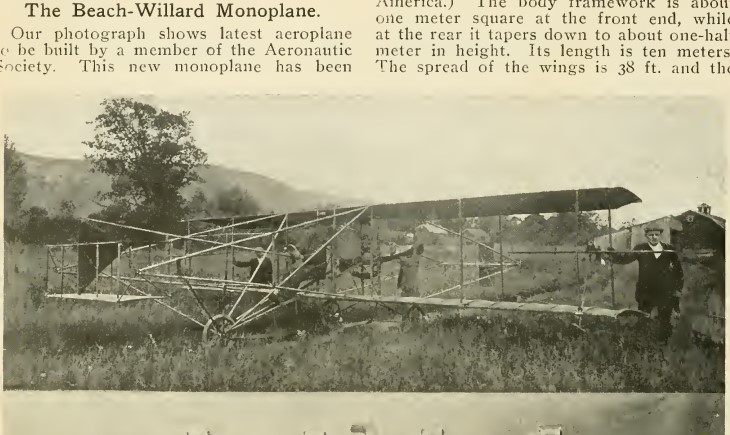

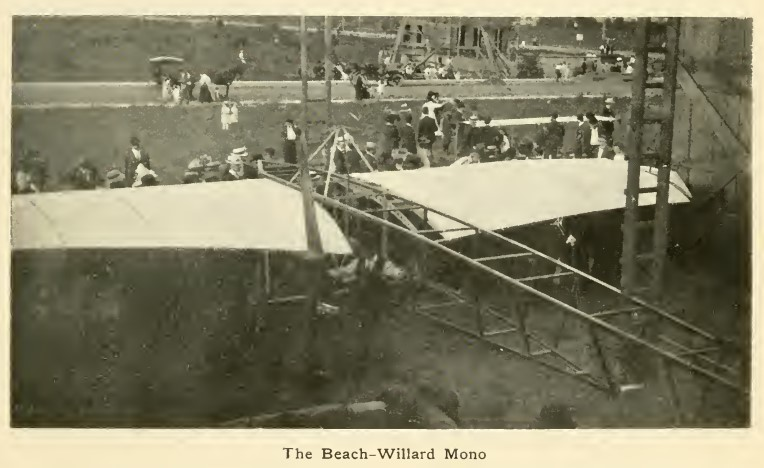
