= René Simon (aviator) =

French aviator (1885–1947)

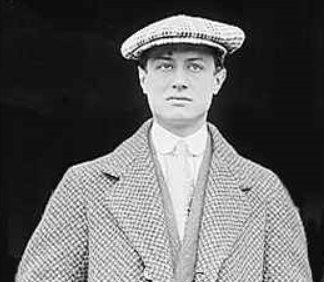
- René Simon, ca 1911
- Born: 8 December 1885; Paris, France
- Died: 21 April 1947 (aged 61)
- Other name: "Flying Fool"
- Occupation: aviator

René Simon (8 December 1885 – 21 April 1947) was a French aviator.

== Biography ==
Simon was born in Paris. He earned a French flying license, number #177, from the Aero Club De France. He toured the United States in 1911–12 with the Moisant International Aviators. He became known for daring tactics, and was called the Flying-Fool by the public.

Simon was involved in what has been termed "the first airplane rescue at sea by another airplane" was made on 14 August 1911. Simon was flying over Lake Michigan in a monoplane, when his plane accidentally went into the water, but did not sink. Pilot Hugh Robinson in a Curtiss hydroplane spotted him and offered to fly him back to shore. Simon, who was comfortable and smoking a cigarette, preferred to wait for a boat to come and tow both him and his plane back to dry land.

In February 1911, the Mexican government engaged Simon to reconnoiter rebel positions near Juarez, Mexico. During World War I, he commanded a squadron that taught acrobatic tactics to fighter pilots. Simon was married by the time of World War I and had a commission as a Capitaine (Captain). He and his wife often dined with high-ranking military officials.

René Simon died in Cannes on 21 April 1947.

== See also ==
- List of pilots awarded an Aviator's Certificate by the Aéro-Club de France in 1910.

== Sources ==
- Kane, Joseph Nathan (1997). Famous First Facts, Fifth Edition. The H. W. Wilson Company. ISBN 0-8242-0930-3. "The first airplane rescue at sea by another airplane was made by Hugh Robinson on August 14, 1911. Pilot Rene Simon had been flying over Lake Michigan in a monoplane and dived down to wave to some motorboats. Unable to rise, he crashed into the lake. Robinson, in a Curtiss hydroplane, flew over to Simon and found him in his floating plane smoking a cigar. Robinson hailed several people in motorboats, and they towed Simon and his monoplane to the shore."
