= Harvard Aviation Field =

- IATA: none; ICAO: none

Summary
- Operator: Private
- Location: Quincy, Massachusetts
- Built: Unknown
- In use: 1910-1916
- Occupants: Private
- Elevation AMSL: 3 ft / 1 m
- Coordinates: 42°17′57.05″N 71°2′2.59″W
- Interactive map of Harvard Aviation Field

Harvard Aviation Field was an airfield operational in the early-20th century near Quincy, Massachusetts., initially developed by the Harvard Aeronautical Society. It was notably used to host the Harvard-Boston Aero Meets of 1910–1912 as well as intercollegiate events. Following the death of pioneering aviatrix Harriet Quimby at the third Air Meet, no further major events were held. The airfield evolved into a US Navy aviation base by 1917, the Squantum Naval Air Station, until its closure in 1953 and the property sold in 1956. The site is now part of Squantum Point Park, created in 2001 and managed by the state of Massachusetts.

== Location ==
The Harvard Aeronautical Society, formed in 1909, quickly outgrew their original testing site near campus, across the Charles River at Soldiers Field. In 1910, they leased an undeveloped 500-acre (200 ha) parcel of marshland and upland located on the Squantum Peninsula, in the southern region of Boston Harbor, from the New York, New Haven and Hartford Railroad and named it Harvard Aviation Field. The airfield's location was given as "Atlantic, Massachusetts," and the railroad station nearest the field was also called Atlantic. This train station was just after the old Neponset station on the New Haven Railroad line (Old Colony Railroad branch) and right before the modern day Red Line North Quincy Station.

== Historical use ==
The Harvard Aviation Field's most publicized usage was the hosting of three major Harvard-Boston Aero Meets between 1910 and 1912.

Apart from those broad public events, the airfield was used by the Harvard Aeronautical Society for testing, practice, and hosting the first Intercollegiate Glider Meet in May 28–30, 1911. The society was an affiliate branch of the "Intercollegiate Aeronautical Association," founded in 1910 by a University of Pennsylvania graduate student, which attracted a variety Northeastern, Ivy League, and Midwestern institutions. Academic and engineering principles of flight were of major interest. Other competitive aspects were on display at the Glider Meet, in which collegiate teams competed in events including speed, accuracy, and bomb dropping.

The “bombs” were inert practice devices with an objective of accuracy—pilots released them over marked ground targets such as circles, crosses, or simulated ships. These contests attracted military attention, especially from the US Army Signal Corps and US Navy observers, because they addressed the then-unanswered question whether aircraft could reliably target objects on the ground or at sea. These competitions also functioned as public, quasi-experimental trials of aerial attack concepts.

After the Harvard's lease expired in 1915, flight testing and instruction continued as the New Haven Railroad rented the airfield to Harry M. Jones who used the site to provide flight instruction. W. Starling Burgess also made occasional use of the airfield for flight testing purposes and to provide flight instruction to buyers of his company's aircraft. In 1916, Sturtevant Aeroplane Company of Hyde Park in Boston took over the airfield briefly. The Sturtevant Company, which later in 1945 became part of Westinghouse, was the first builder of airplane engines in Massachusetts, the first to produce all-metal fuselage planes for the US Navy and Army, and the only large scale aircraft manufacturer in the Boston area. The area then became part of the US Navy aviation operations from 1917 to 1953, then part of commercial development plans until partly preserved for the public today as Squantum Point Park in 2001.

=== Harvard-Boston air meets ===
The first, inaugural meet was occurred over September 3–13, 1910. It was the second major air event in the United States, and the largest in the Northeast, surpassed only by the first major US event in January of that same year, the Los Angeles International Air Meet at Dominguez Field. The Harvard-Boston Air Meet was huge success with thousands of paying spectators and an estimated 1 million onlookers over the entire period. Programmed events included speed and distance competitions, altitude and endurance attempts, figure-eight and circuit races, and cross-country flights, most notably the Boston Globe Interstate Aero Race; $50,000 in prizes and appearance fees were offered. Participants included the Wright brothers, the Glenn Curtiss exhibition teams and Claude Grahame-White. United States President William Howard Taft and Massachusetts Governor Eben Sumner Draper were reported to have attended.

Military interest in early aviation was evidenced by several high ranking and retired military officials in attendance, including the US Navy Secretary [George von Lengerke Meyer]:

"On account of the great popularity of the aviators, and so Secretary of the Navy Meyer could attend to see the bomb-throwing contests, the meet was extended two days, and some new prizes were offered. One of these, the Commodore Barry trophy, donated by John Barry Ryan, was for accuracy in dropping bombs from an altitude of 1,500 to 1,800 feet. At the end of the meet one of its organizers remarked regarding the bomb-dropping, 'The demonstration proved conclusively that the airplane must be reckoned with in any future wars.'"

The Harvard Aeronautical Society hoped to use profits to fund a new department of aeronautics at Harvard. Despite the airshow's public success, it actually lost money, $22,000, mostly because of expensive improvements to the aviation field.

The Second Harvard-Boston Air Meet was scheduled for August 26 to September 4, 1911; storms disrupted some scheduled flying. It featured notable pilots and machines of the era, including Thomas Sopwith in a Nieuport monoplane and Lincoln Beachey in a Curtiss biplane (Model D), with events such as altitude and quick-climb contests, accuracy landing, and long cross-country flights. A major highlight was the Boston Globe $10,000 interstate cross-country race, won by Boston native Earle Ovington, and a separate biplane race won by Lieutenant T. D. Milling of the U.S. Navy, underscoring rapid technical progress in aircraft performance over just one year.

The Third (and final) Harvard-Boston Air Meet—referred to in period sources as the “Third Annual Boston Aviation Meet”—was scheduled to take place from June 29 to July 7, 1912, under the direction of William A.P. Willard, with multiple prominent aviators expected to enter. Significant investment in the aviation field was made, including new runways and new hangar buildings. However, tragedy struck on July 1 for Harriet Quimby, celebrated as the first American woman licensed pilot and for her English Channel flight earlier that year. Before thousands of spectators, Quimby flew her new two-seat Blériot XI monoplane during the show with Willard as her passenger—when the plane pitched downward he was thrown from the plane and unable to balance the plane, she fell out too. Reports of invited aviators and competitive events were eclipsed by the fatal accident; this incident appears to have ended Harvard's further involvement with meets and the airfield.

=== Squantum Naval Air Base ===
In the early spring of 1917, with US entry into World War I, the Massachusetts Naval Militia built a small wooden seaplane hangar and pier on the adjacent shoreline for primary naval flight training. The Navy took over that seaplane facility later that spring, encompassing the Harvard Aviation Field, as the Squantum Naval Air Station, but by that fall the base was closed and operations transferred to warmer locations for year-round training. After a period of inactivity, with the assistance of Richard E. Byrd and other WWI veterans, the seaplane base was re-opened on 15 August 1923 as the Naval Reserve Air Station (NRAS) Squantum. A turf airfield was augmented in 1929, leading to its designation as Naval Reserve Air Base (NRAB).

In the World War II era, the base was redesignated Naval Air Station (NAS) Squantum. It played multiple roles during the war — from combat patrols (anti-submarine missions) to primary and advanced flight training for US Navy and Royal Navy aviators. After the war, NAS Squantum continued as a reserve aviation training center, but limitations of very short runways and proximity to Boston Logan Airport increasingly limited operations. By December 1953, the Navy officially closed NAS Squantum.

The site was sold at auction in 1956 to the Boston Edison Company a large regional electric utility corporation. Eventually, the land was leased to marina operators and eventually redeveloped into the Marina Bay (Quincy, Massachusetts) Marina Bay residential and commercial community. The area encompassing the runways of the original airfields were transferred to the State of Massachusetts as Squantum Point Park, created in 2001.

== Accidents and incidents ==
- Harriet Quimby and William A.P. Willard were killed there in a plane crash on 1 July 1912.
