= Jacques de Lesseps =

French aviator

Jacques Benjamin de Lesseps was a French aviator born in Paris on 5 July 1883, killed in an air accident presumably on 18 October 1927 along with his flight engineer Theodor Chichenko. He was the son of French diplomat and entrepreneur Ferdinand de Lesseps. In 1910, he married Grace Mackenzie, daughter of Sir Willam Mackenzie.

== Early aviation career ==
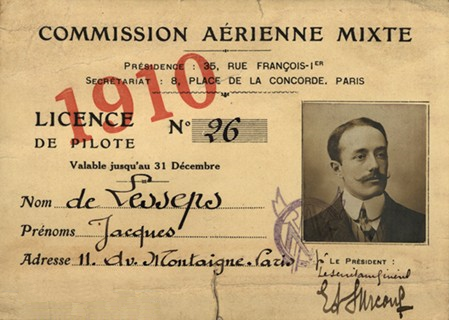
Jacques de Lesseps's pilot's license

In 1910, Jacques de Lesseps became the second person to fly an aeroplane over the English Channel. His aircraft was a Blériot Type XI like the one Louis Blériot himself used for the first Channel crossing the year before.

== Military career ==
De Lesseps served with distinction in the French Air Force during World War I, commanding a squadron. He joined the Compagnie Aerienne Franco-Canadienne in air survey work after the war.

== Death ==
He and his flight engineer, Theodor Chichenko, disappeared during air photography operations off the coast of Matane on 18 October 1927.

The body of de Lesseps was found a couple of days later after it washed ashore in Newfoundland. He was buried in Gaspé.

A cairn erected to his memory exists near Gaspé. It records that de Lesseps was the second man to fly the English Channel by airplane. He was a Chevalier of the Legion of Honour, held the Croix de Guerre and the United States Distinguished Service Cross.
