= Grand Central Palace =

Former exhibition hall in New York City

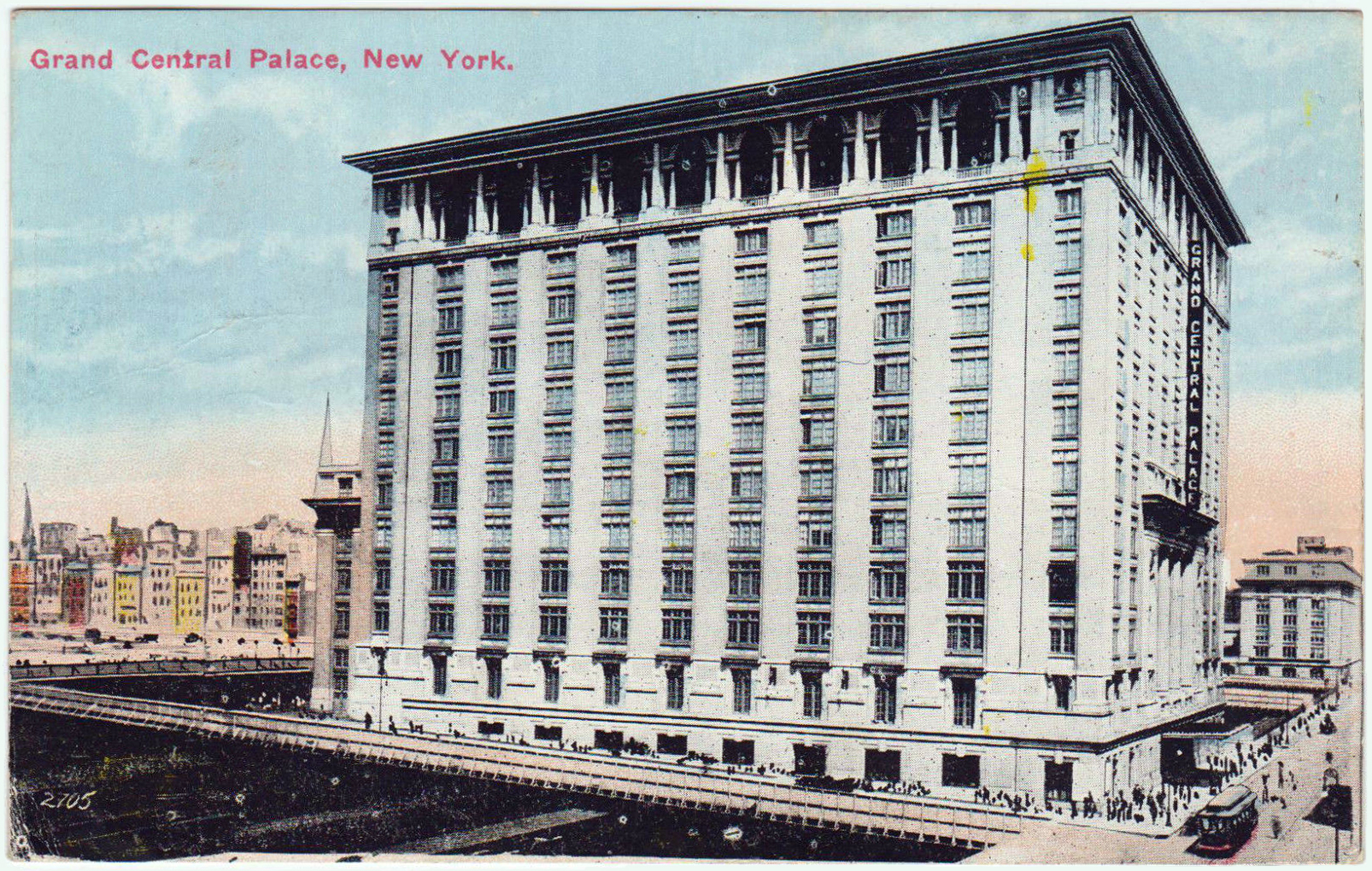
- Postcard of the 1911 Grand Central Palace
- Interactive map of the Grand Central Palace area

General information
- Architectural style: Beaux-Arts architectural style
- Location: Manhattan, New York City
- Coordinates: 40°45′16″N 73°58′27″W
- Opened: 1911
- Demolished: 1964

Design and construction
- Architect: Warren and Wetmore

The Grand Central Palace was an exhibition hall in Midtown Manhattan, New York City. The name was used for two structures, both located on Lexington Avenue near Grand Central Terminal.

The original structure was a six-story structure built in 1893 between 43rd and 44th Streets. It was demolished during the construction of Grand Central Terminal, and a new 13-story structure was constructed between 46th and 47th Streets. The second Grand Central Palace was designed by Grand Central Terminal architects Warren and Wetmore and Reed and Stem in the Beaux-Arts architectural style, and had almost twice as much room as the original structure. The Palace served as New York's main exposition hall from 1911 until 1953, when the exhibition space was replaced by office space for the Internal Revenue Service. The building was demolished starting in 1964. Throughout its history, the Grand Central Palace hosted auto, boat, flower and trade shows, though parts of the Palace were used as office space. The first Palace was also used as a temporary railroad terminal during the construction of Grand Central Terminal in the 1900s.

== History ==
=== Original structure ===
The original Grand Central Palace was constructed in 1893 on the block bounded by Lexington Avenue, Depew Place, and 43rd and 44th Streets. At the time, Depew Place was an alley located west of Lexington Avenue, which formed the eastern boundary of Grand Central Depot to the west. The original Palace, a six-story structure made of brick, contained 310,000 square feet (29,000 m^{2}) of floor space.

The land under the original Grand Central Palace was originally owned by the estate of the entrepreneur Robert Goelet, who died in 1899. His will prohibited the sale of the land on which the Palace was located. In 1902, in preparation for Grand Central Terminal's construction, the trustees of the Goelet estate offered the land to the New York Central Railroad, operator of Grand Central Depot, for use as the site of a proposed new post office. However, the land would have to be acquired through condemnation of the site. New York Central bought two blocks of land east of the future terminal, bounded by Lexington Avenue, Depew Place, and 43rd and 45th Streets, in December 1904. This land acquisition included the Grand Central Palace. After the land acquisition, New York Central continued to receive bookings for events at Grand Central Palace.

As Grand Central Terminal was being completed and the New York Central's steam-railway lines into Grand Central were electrified, the railroad's commuter rail lines moved their operations to a temporary station under Grand Central Palace. The temporary station had fourteen tracks, ten of which were electrified with third rail. The Hudson Line was the first to be electrified, on September 30, 1906. The temporary station was not ready until November of that year. By that time, trains on the Harlem Line were electrified, and its operations moved to the basement of Grand Central Palace. New Haven Line electric trains started running to Grand Central Palace in October 1907. The Palace was used as the terminal for all three lines while the old Grand Central Station was being demolished in sections, a process that started in 1910.

The original Palace was demolished by 1913 to make way for Grand Central Terminal.

=== New structure ===
A new 13-story building was opened on May 19, 1911. The 13-story building, with twice as much floor space as the previous structure, was located on the west side of Lexington Avenue between 46th and 47th Streets, occupying the air rights over the railroad tracks leading into Grand Central Terminal. The Palace was designed by Warren and Wetmore and Reed and Stem, who had also designed Grand Central Terminal. It was the first structure designed as part of Terminal City, a series of commercial developments that were built after Grand Central's formerly open-air rail yards were covered over. The Palace was New York's main exposition hall until it closed in 1953. Its location and the proximity of Grand Central Terminal spurred the construction of a hotel district in the area.

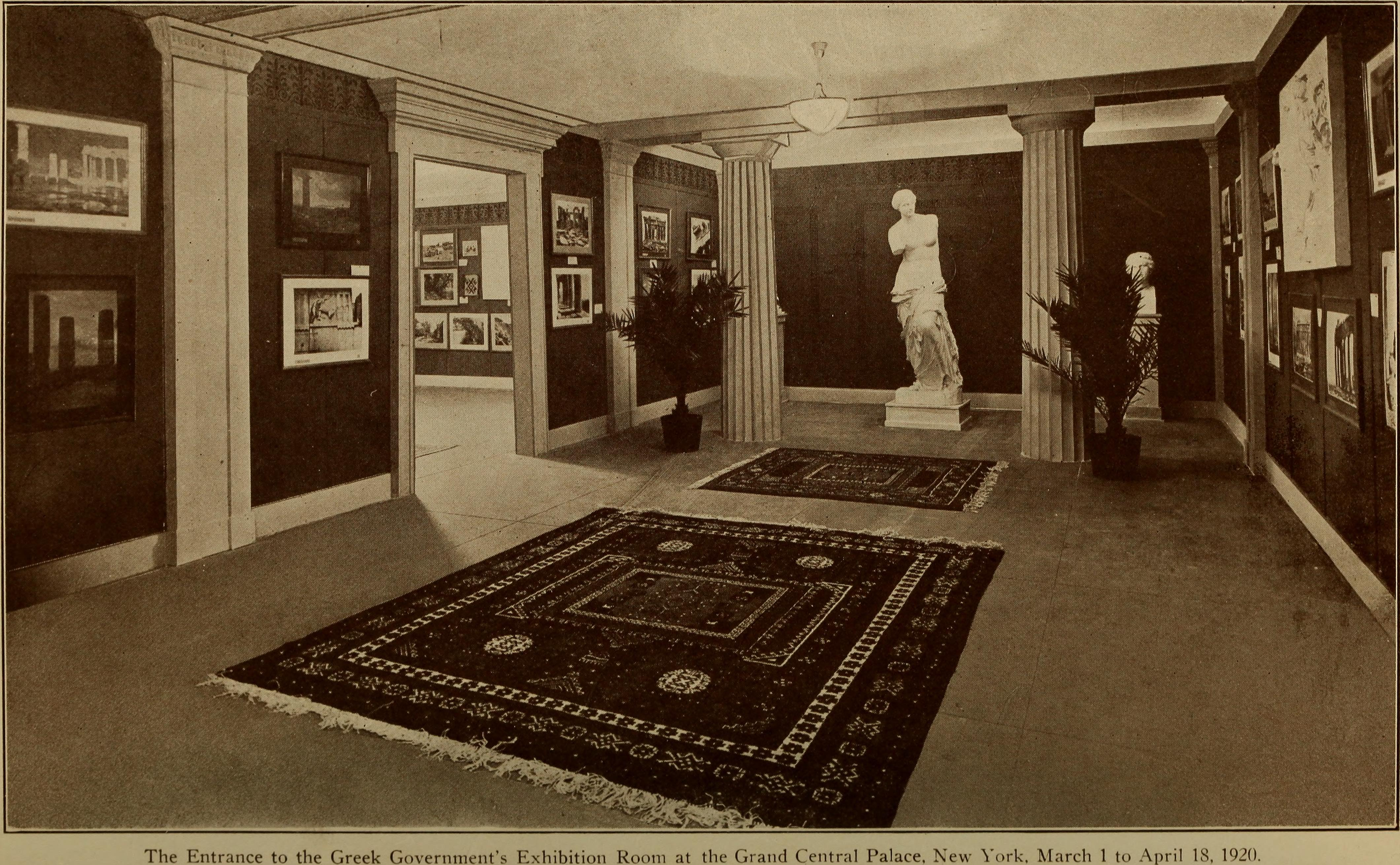
Greece, a 1920 exhibition at the Palace

Alfred I. du Pont and a group of associates took over the Grand Central Palace's lease in May 1918. Subsequently, in August 1918, the building was rented to the U.S. government, which used the structure as a hospital during World War I. The government relinquished the Palace to du Pont's syndicate in April 1919. The following year, du Pont and his associates announced that no new exhibitions would be held in the Grand Central Palace after April 1921, effectively leaving the city without a major exhibition space. The syndicate later clarified that only the International Exposition of Industries would continue to be held in the Palace.

In 1920, the structure's lease was transferred to Robert M. Catts. The following year, Catts proposed $500,000 worth of improvements to the Palace as part of the construction of a $3 million, 18-story office building on an adjacent empty plot. The plan entailed converting the Grand Central Palace into an office building and attaching it to the adjacent structure via an arcade. The main entrance to the remodeled structure would be relocated to Park Avenue to the west, while the floor below, which faced Lexington Avenue, would be converted into retail. The Grand Central Palace would have been renamed the Central Square Building because at the time, there was a "central square" to the west, which abutted the north end of Grand Central Terminal. He formally filed plans for the construction of the annex the next year, and the new 20-story office building was completed by 1923. However, in 1925, Catts dispelled rumors that the Grand Central Palace would be transformed into an office building. Catts's enterprises became insolvent and went into receivership in 1927, though Grand Central Palace continued to host events.

August Heckscher secured control of the Palace's lease in 1923. In the same transaction, he bought other real estate on the same block. A syndicate led by Thomas H. Birch purchased the Palace and adjacent Park-Lexington Building in January 1927 with plans to demolish the building and build a Spanish trade center named Casa de las Espanas in its place. Though the Count of Peracamps, a Philippine businessman, visited the Palace in March of that year in an effort to promote the proposed trade center, the deal did not go through. Control of the Palace and Park-Lexington Building was transferred to the publisher Condé Nast in 1928. As part of Conde Nast's purchase of the Palace, the eight upper floors would be turned into sales offices, while the three lower floors would continue to be used as exhibition space.

By 1932, the mortgage covering the Palace and the Park-Lexington Building was being foreclosed upon. In 1933, Heckscher offered to sell the Grand Central Palace to the federal government for $6 million, so it could be replaced with a post office facility. At the time, the Palace was located atop part of the Grand Central Terminal's storage yards, and there was a mail chute from the building to the tracks underneath. Because the New York Central Railroad still owned the land underneath the Palace, if the transaction were successful, only the air rights above the tracks would have been sold.

The onset of World War II in the 1940s caused the suspension of several exhibitions. For instance, in 1941, the National Motor Boat Show was suspended for the first time since 1904. The next year, the International Flower Show was also suspended until the end of the war. In October 1942, the Grand Central Palace was turned into an induction center for the U.S. Army, replacing a center on Governors Island. After more than a half million soldiers had been inducted at the Palace, the last fourteen inductions occurred in September 1945. The induction center was closed soon afterward.

After the war, it was announced that the New York Coliseum, a new exhibition hall being built across town in Columbus Circle, would replace Grand Central Palace as the city's main exhibition hall. By then, the dilapidated facilities at the Grand Central Palace were repelling potential exhibitors. In 1952, the federal government signed a letter of intent to lease the lowest four floors, at the time being used as exhibition space, and converted them into office space for the Internal Revenue Service (IRS). After objections from several exhibition hosts, the New York Convention and Visitors Bureau asked that exhibitions be allowed at the Grand Central Palace until the Coliseum opened in 1956. The federal government initially dropped plans for a lease in February 1953. However, the next month, the federal government signed a lease agreement to convert the four lower floors into 171,000 square feet (15,900 m^{2}) of office space. As part of the agreement, shows would continue to be held at the Palace until November 1953, at which point renovations would begin. In the meantime, until the Coliseum opened, exhibitions would be held at the Kingsbridge Armory in the Bronx as well as other armories in Manhattan.

The Grand Central Palace's demise started in 1955, when the entire area around the terminal was opened for development in an attempt to net more money for the struggling New York Central Railroad. By 1957, the du Pont estate proposed constructing five office buildings on a three-block site near Grand Central Terminal that included the Palace. In 1963, it was announced that the Grand Central Palace would be demolished to make way for a 47-story office building being designed by Uris Buildings Corporation, which had acquired the leasehold for both the Palace and a nearby building. Demolition started in June 1964. The site of the Palace is now occupied by 245 Park Avenue.

== Architecture ==
The original Grand Central Palace was a six-story brick structure. Its footprint measured 200 by 275 feet (61 by 84 m) and it contained 310,000 square feet (29,000 m^{2}) of floor space. The first floor, at ground level, had cafes that flanked the entrance to Lexington Avenue on the east, as well as a large exhibition area. There was a grand staircase to the second floor, which had a three-story-high glass-domed hall with 12,000 square feet (1,100 m^{2}) of floor space; the entire level contained a total of 55,000 square feet (5,100 m^{2}). The third and fourth floors were devoted to galleries flanking either side of the second-floor hall, while the fifth and sixth floors formed a "hollow square"-shaped balcony above the glass dome. The interior was lit by more than 4,000 incandescent light bulbs, including seven chandeliers that collectively contained 700 bulbs. More than 50,000 people could be accommodated in the original building simultaneously. The structure had a 50,000-square-foot (4,600 m^{2}) roof with a seasonal roof garden and a stage. A bridge connected the Palace to the Grand Central Depot, across Depew Place to the west.

The second Grand Central Palace followed the precedent set by the Beaux-Arts architecture of Grand Central Terminal. It contained over 600,000 square feet (56,000 m^{2}) of floor area. The Lexington Avenue facade featured a portico supported by four classical columns. The lower three stories were occupied by exhibition spaces with the main exhibition hall on the second and third stories, and the ten upper floors were used for offices.

== Events and tenants ==
The Grand Central Palace hosted auto, boat, flower and trade shows. The Palace was the main exhibition center for New York City during the first half of the 20th century. By 1927, it hosted two million guests annually. Office tenants in the Palace included the Selective Service and the Internal Revenue Service.

The first exhibitions at the Grand Central Palace were trade shows held in 1893, before the structure was even completed. Upon the Palace's opening in May 1893, the first exhibition held there was the gathering of the New York Press Club. Other early tenants included the flower show, amateur boxing, and exhibits from Catholic school students. However, the structure stood empty for the rest of the year, when it held some exhibits from the World's Columbian Exposition in Chicago. One of the larger events hosted in the first Palace was a Democratic Party political rally in 1900, which was described at the time as "one of the largest ever held in the Grand Central Palace".

The first auto show held in Grand Central Palace occurred in 1907 and was hosted by the Automobile Club of America. At the time, a separate auto show for foreign cars was hosted at the Madison Square Garden. In 1911, the First Industrial Aeroplane Show (now the Industrial Airplane Show), was held in conjunction with the North American International Auto Show at Grand Central Palace. The event ran from December 31, 1910, through mid-January 1911. It was a major event at the time, as many of the public had never seen an airplane. The two auto shows were combined starting in 1913, though the combined auto shows were still split between Madison Square Garden and the new Grand Central Palace.

The Palace was also the site of the Women's Industrial Expositions from 1912 to 1915. The Westminster Kennel Club Dog Show was held at the Grand Central Palace, as well as the Exposition of Architecture and Allied Arts in the late 1920s and early 1930s. The 1927 exposition featured the installation of a Welte-Mignon theater organ in the hall.

The Palace has also been used by the federal government during world wars. In September 1918, during World War I, the Grand Central Palace was leased as "Disembarkation Hospital no. 5" for American Expeditionary Forces returning from Europe. The Palace was used in this way until April 1919. Starting in October 1942, the Grand Central Palace was turned into an induction center for the U.S. Army, being used as such until September 1945.
