= Order of Icarus =

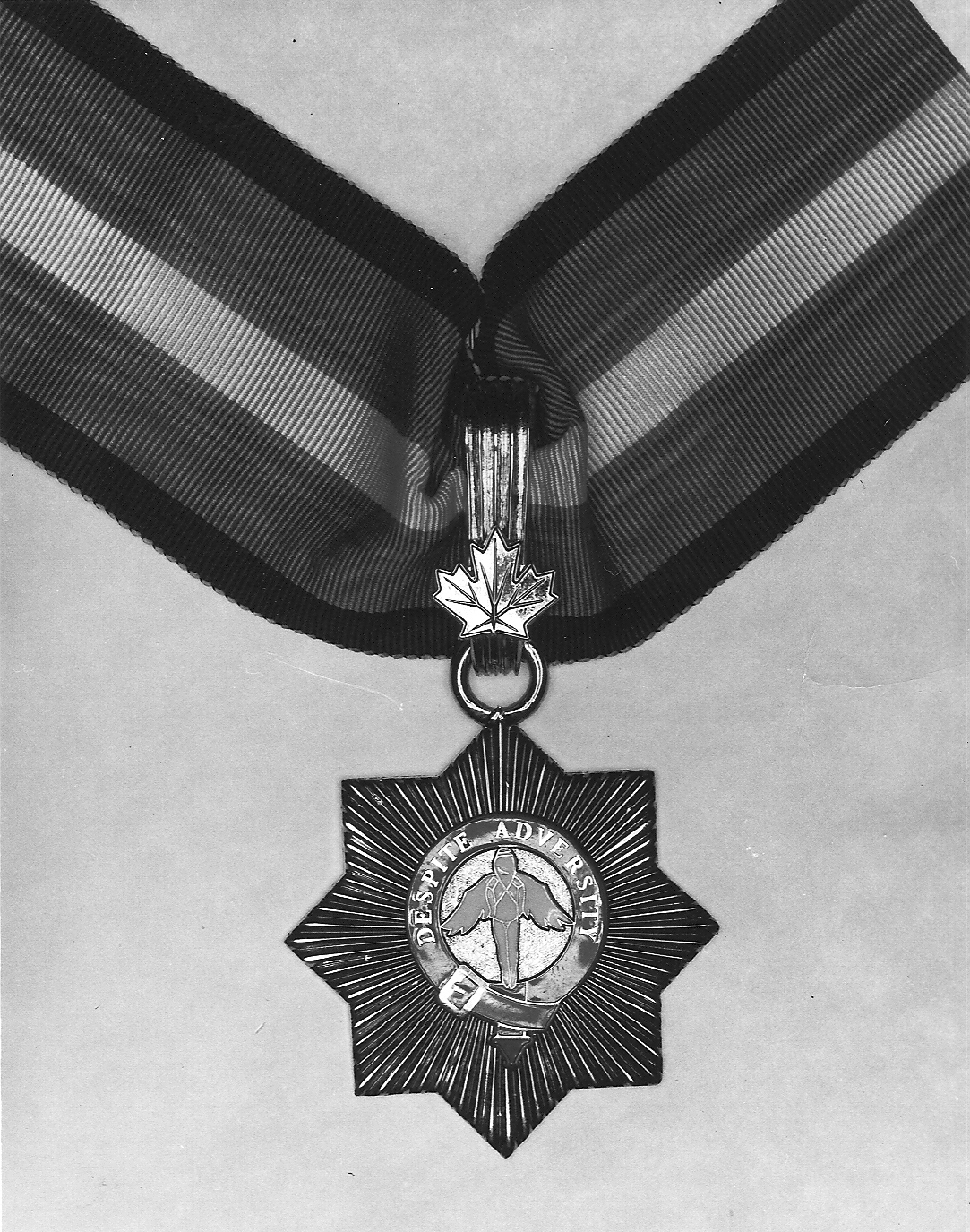
- Order of Icarus

Awarded by Senior Companions
- Type: Order (decoration)
- Established: 1967
- Country: Canada
- Motto: Despite Adversity
- Eligibility: All living Canadian aviators.
- Awarded for: To honour those persons still living whose airborne skills had resulted in outstanding benefits to crewed flight.
- Status: Inactive
- Grades: Companion

Statistics
- First induction: 1967
- Last induction: 1981
- Total inductees: 46
- Ribbon bar

The Order of Icarus (C.O.I.) is the highest aviation award next to the Trans-Canada (McKee) Trophy that is awarded to Canadian aviators who have made a lasting contribution to crewed flight. The order ceased existence in 1981.

== Creation ==
The Order was developed as part of the 1967 centennial year for Canada, as aviation's role in the development of the country came into scrutiny. The honours then awarded for aviation proved to be inadequate, as no other award other than the McKee Trophy existed at the time. Several noteworthy aviators decided that this void needed to be filled. And as a result, the Order of Icarus was founded which honoured those persons still living at the time whose airborne skills had resulted in outstanding benefits to crewed flight in Canada.

After a lengthy search through various mythologies, the early members settled on the Greek story of Icarus. According to myth, Icarus' father Daedalus, under an unjust sentence of death by King Minos of Crete, created wings of feather and wax with which he and his son could fly to freedom. When an exhilarated Icarus flew too high, the heat of the sun destroyed his wings, melting the wax that held the feathers together. Icarus fell and died in the Icarian Sea, the "first airman casualty".

== Grades ==
Companion is the only grade within the Order, except for the three persons governing the affairs of the Order, who are known as Senior Companions.

== Insignia ==
The Order's insignia depicts a gilt sunburst around a white enameled figure representing Icarus. The sunburst also figures the cardinal points of the compass. The figure's wings are folded and mismatched to remind Companions of the Order of "airborne imperfections". Circling the figure, representing a single binding cause, is a knight's belt which displays, in gold letters, the motto "Despite Adversity". The golden loop which suspends the insignia is adorned with a maple leaf in honor of the Canadian origin of the Order. The neck ribbon has a broad white center stripe which represents flight's purity before the golden sun. The two blue lines which split this stripe suggest "the companionship of airmen in adversity". The broad band is a blue indicative of unexplored space, while the black bars outlying are reminders of mortality.

== Eligibility and appointment ==
The basic tenets of the Order are:

- membership shall be restricted to those adult persons whose contributions to crewed flight while in operational control of an airborne device in free flight, has substantially benefitted Canadian aviation.
- it shall number no more than 50 living Companions, inclusive of the three Senior Companions.
- it shall in no manner become associated with any group or body politic.
- it shall in no manner become indebted to any group, person, society, or government.
- it shall in no manner be profited from by any Companion, save that reward of good fellowship and common respect.

The following is a list of the Companions of the Order of Icarus and the year invested.

1967

- C.H. Dickens
- J.C. Sloan
- R.A. Munro
- J.L. Rood
- H.W. Seagrim
- P.A. Hartman
- B.W. Mead

1969

- S.R. McMillan
- A.M. McMullen
- W. Gilbert
- T.F. Williams
- L.J. Tripp
- S.A. Tomlinson
- A.G. Sims
- N. Forester
- G.H. Finland
- H.W. Hayter
- M.G.M. Knox

1973

- D.N. Watson
- J. Moar
- M.W. Ward
- B. Balchen
- M.F. Reilly
- J.H. Reilly

1974

- N.J. Armstrong
- H.M. Bristol
- S. Graham
- P.S. Turner
- R.C. Randall
- Z.L. Leigh
- W.W. Fowler
- R. Collishaw
- G.B. Lothian

1975

- K.R Greenaway
- W.G. Leach
- H. Hollick-Kenyon
- T.W. Siers

1977

- J.E. Fauqier

1978

- J.A.M. Austin
- B.A. Rawson
- G.L. MacInnis

1981

- W.F.M. Newson
- K.L. Guthrie
- A.H. Wilson
- A.E. Godfrey
- W.F.S. Luck
