= Canada's Aviation Hall of Fame =

Museum in Alberta, Canada

- Established: 1973
- Location: The Hangar Flight Museum; Calgary, Alberta, Canada
- Coordinates: 51.094167°N 114.013056°W
- Website: www.cahf.ca

Canada's Aviation Hall of Fame, based in The Hangar Flight Museum in Calgary, Alberta, Canada, commemorates and honours those whose accomplishments in aviation contributed so much to Canada's development as a nation. Founded in 1973, the Hall of Fame has honoured thus far more than 200 aviators, engineers, technicians and administrators.

Due to its size and geographical location, Canada has had to rely upon aviation more than other countries. With territory unsuitable for surface travel, it was up to aviation to unite the country and bring the distant regions the opportunities for social and economic progress that would make them part of Canada. The combination of pioneering aviation and pioneering development of the country resulted in examples of heroism, skill, tenacity, courage, wisdom, and luck, and multiple stories to be told. The best of these stories are described in the Aviation Hall of Fame.

Stories are told on four by eight foot panels with portraits, citations, photographs, and memorabilia. The Hall has an extensive collection of personal items and memorabilia related to inducted members, including such material as licenses, logbooks, uniforms, insignia, medals, trophies and awards, documents, correspondence, scrapbooks and photographs. The reference library contains approximately 2,500 books and over 12,000 periodicals related specifically to Canadian aviation. Items are loaned to other museums in Canada for exhibit purposes, and may be accessed by researchers and visitors, by appointment.

The Hall of Fame also awards the Belt of Orion and the Order of Polaris each year at its annual induction dinner, to an organization notable for its contribution to Canadian aviation.

== History ==
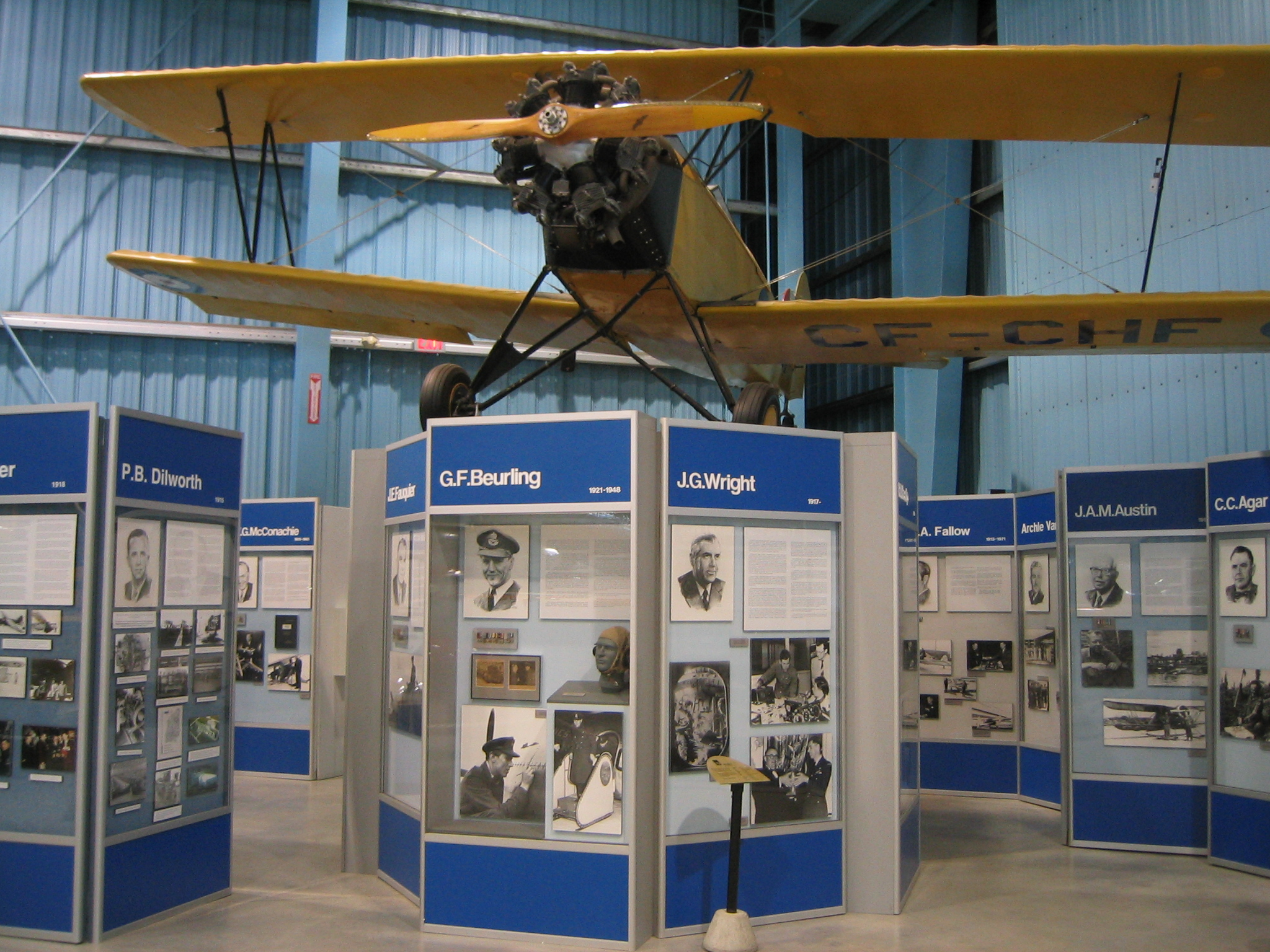
View from inside the Aviation Hangar Exhibit at the Reynolds-Alberta Museum

Canada's Aviation Hall of Fame was incorporated August 2, 1973. The 79 original members included all Companions of the Order of Icarus, all who had been awarded the Trans-Canada (McKee) Trophy, all recipients of the Victoria Cross in aerial combat, Alexander Graham Bell and F.W. "Casey" Baldwin for designing and building the Silver Dart, and Group Captain John Emilius Fauquier representing the Second World War RAF Bomber Command and Flight Lieutenant George Frederick "Buzz" Beurling representing the Second World War RAF Fighter Command. A confidential nomination review committee reviews nominations for new members of the Hall of Fame, looking for contributions of major benefit to Canada which have stood the test of time.

The Hall of Fame officially opened on the first day of Klondike Days, July 17, 1974, in the Sportex Building at the Edmonton Exhibition Grounds. During the initial years it moved several times until finally residing in the Edmonton Convention Centre for several years. When the Reynolds-Alberta Museum opened near Wetaskiwin, Alberta, in 1992, the Hall of Fame moved to the museum's aviation hangar, combining and merging its exhibits with the museum's extensive aviation collection.

In 2022, the hall of fame relocated to The Hangar Flight Museum in Calgary.

== Inductees ==
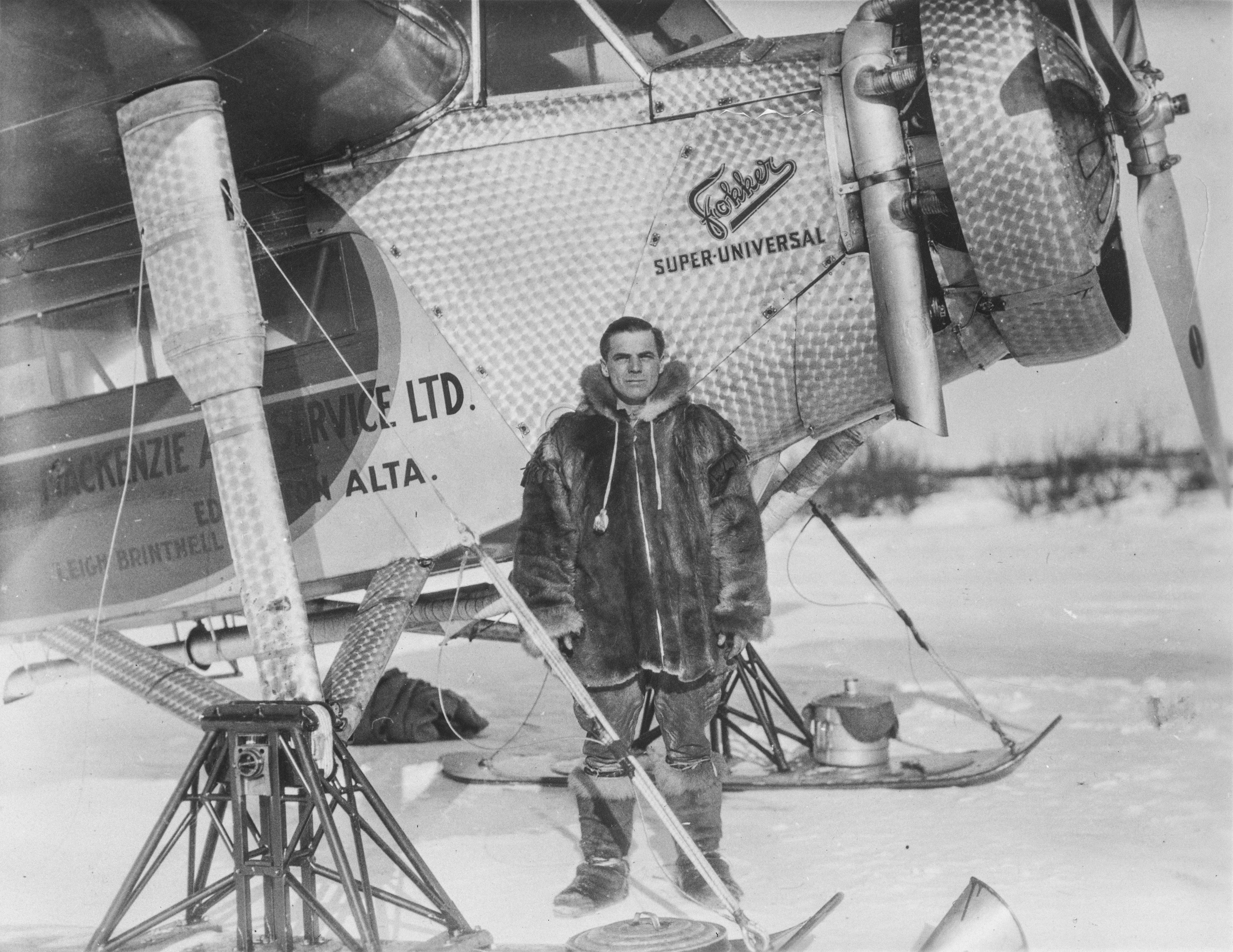
Fokker Super Universal in Alberta, Canada 1935. The person is famous Canadian aviator Leigh Brintnell inducted into the hall of fame

The Hall has inducted the following people, arranged in alphabetical order, with their year of induction in parentheses.

Official medal of Canada's Aviation Hall of Fame

- Carlyle Clare Agar (1974)
- William Munroe Archibald (1974)
- Neil J Armstrong (1974)
- Julien Joseph Audette (1989)
- John Alexander "Jack" Austin (1976)
- James Tocher Bain (2000)
- Albert William Baker (2000)
- Russell Francis Baker (1975)
- Ronald John Baker (1994)
- Bernt Balchen (1974)
- Frederick Walker Baldwin (1974)
- Russell Bannock (1983)
- William George Barker (1974)
- Ian Willoughby Bazalgette (1974)
- Laurent Beaudoin (1999)
- Clive John Beddoe (2014)
- Alexander Graham Bell (1974)
- Victor Robert Bennett (2013)
- Arthur Massey Berry (1974)
- George Frederick "Buzz" Beurling (1974)
- Leonard Joseph Birchall (2001)
- William Avery "Billy" Bishop (1974)
- Rosella Marie Bjornson (1997)
- Thurston Blakey (1992)
- Ernest Joseph Boffa (1993)
- William Brenton Boggs (2003)
- J. Erroll Boyd (2017)
- Robert William Bradford (1996)
- Wilfred Leigh Brintnell (1976)
- Helen Marcelle Harrison Bristol (1974)
- A. Roy Brown (2015)
- Francis Roy Brown (1976)
- Frederick Howard Buller (1999)
- Maurice "Moss" Burbidge (1974)
- Carl Frederick Burke (1982)
- Erskine Leigh Capreol (1981)
- Frederick James Carmichael (2016)
- William Keir Carr (2001)
- Nicholas Byron Cavadias (1996)
- Alfred Beebe Caywood (1988)
- James Arthur Chamberlin (2001)
- Walter Chmela (2006)
- Nils Christensen (2012)
- Larry Denman Clarke (1996)
- Raymond Collishaw (1974)
- Thomas Charles Cooke (2004)
- Thomas Paul Michael "Mike" Cooper-Slipper (2003)
- John W. Crichton (2011)
- Wilfred Austin "Wilf" Curtis (1984)
- Paul Yettvart Davoud (1985)
- Lorna Vivian deBlicquy (2014)
- Robert John Deluce (2017)
- Stanley Matthew Deluce (2007)
- Clennell Haggerston "Punch" Dickins (1974)
- Paul Bernard Dilworth (2000)
- Craig Laurence Dobbin (2007)
- Robert Leslie Dodds (1994)
- Vera Elise Strodl Dowling (2000)
- Clarence Rupert Dunlap (2002)
- John Talbot Dyment (1988)
- Harold Edwards (2012)
- James Francis Edwards (2013)
- Robert Parsons Engle (2014)
- Maurice D'arcy Allen Fallow (1992)
- John Emilius Fauquier (1974)
- George Harold Finland (1974)
- James Charles Floyd (1993)
- Norman Gladstone Forester (1974)
- Robert Howden Fowler (1980)
- Walter Warren Fowler (1974)
- Kathleen Carol Fox (2016)
- Thomas Payne Fox (1983)
- James Henry Foy (1980)
- Wilbur Rounding Franks (1983)
- Douglas Cowan Fraser (1987)
- Alexander Beaufort Fraser Fraser-Harris (2005)
- Elmer Garfield Fullerton (1974)
- Marc Garneau (2008)
- Philip Clarke Garratt (1974)
- Walter Gilbert (1974)
- Albert Earl Godfrey (1978)
- Stuart Graham (1974)
- Roy Stanley Grandy (1988)
- Robert Hampton Gray (1974)
- Keith Rogers Greenaway (1974)
- Seth Walter Grossmith (1990)
- Chris Austin Hadfield (2005)
- Harry Halton (1984)
- Donald T. Hamilton (2011)
- Paul Albert Hartman (1974)
- Henry Winston Hayter (1974)
- Robert Thomas Heaslip (1974)
- Joseph Fernand Henley (2013)
- Richard Duncan Hiscocks (1998)
- Fred Harvey Hitchins (2007)
- Basil Deacon Hobbs (1987)
- Herbert Hollick-Kenyon (1974)
- Herbert Hopson (1989)
- David Ernest Hornell (1974)
- Frederick William Hotson (1998)
- Clarence Decatur Howe (1976)
- Albert Edward Hutt (1992)
- Pierre J. H. Jeanniot (2012)
- William Gladstone Jewitt (1978)
- Frederick Ronald Kearns (2008)
- Harry Marlowe Kennedy (1979)
- Leslie George Kerr (1999)
- William George Melvin Knox (1974)
- Thomas Lamb (2009)
- Reginald John Lane (2000)
- Willy Laserich (2010)
- Thomas Albert Lawrence (1980)
- Wilson George Leach (1974)
- Robert Leckie (1988)
- Zebulon Lewis Leigh (1974)
- William Ross Lennox (2016)
- Alexander John Lilly (1984)
- George Bayliss Lothian (1974)
- Joseph Henry Lucas (1991)
- William Floyd Sheldon Luck (1981)
- Charles Horace Luttman (2009)
- Frank Archibald MacDougall (1974)
- Elizabeth Muriel Gregory MacGill (1983)
- Gerald Lester MacInnis (1974)
- Donald Roderick MacLaren (1977)
- Merlin William MacLeod (1977)
- Kenneth Cecil Maclure (2005)
- Kenneth Berry Marsden (2009)
- Wilfrid Reid "Wop" May (1974)
- William Sidney May (1979)
- James Stewart McBride (2015)
- Frederick McCall (1978)
- Donald Stuart McClure (2002)
- Eric Charles McConachie (2005)
- George William Grant McConachie (1974)
- John Alexander Douglas McCurdy (1974)
- Gordon Roy McGregor (1974)
- Robert Billo McIntyre (2007)
- Daniel Erskine McIvor (2002)
- Alexander Daniel McLean (1974)
- Walter McDonald McLeish (2003)
- Alan Arnett McLeod (1974)
- Stanley Ransom McMillan (1974)
- Archibald Major McMullen (1974)
- Robert Wendell "Buck" McNair (1990)
- Bert William Mead (1974)
- Almer Leonard Michaud (1993)
- Robert Bruce Middleton (1989)
- Lawrence Joseph Milberry (2004)
- George Edward Miller (2015)
- Jack Moar (1974)
- Frederick Alexander McCully Moore (2014)
- Angus Curran Morrison (1989)
- Redford Henry Mulock (2010)
- Raymond Alan Munro (1974)
- Andrew Charles Mynarski (1974)
- George Arthur Neal (1995)
- William Francis Newson (1984)
- Harold Anthony Oaks (1974)
- Marion Alice Orr (1982)
- John Ender "Jock" Palmer (1988)
- Hubert Pasmore (2008)
- Julie Payette (2010)
- Ronald Peel (1991)
- George Hector Reid Phillips (1974)
- Owen Bartley Philp (2015)
- Welland Wilfred Phipps (1974)
- John Lawrence Plant (1985)
- Peter Geoffrey Powell (1990)
- Robert Cheetham Randall (1974)
- Bernard Anderson Rawson (1974)
- Thomas Mayne Reid (1974)
- John Hardisty Reilly (1974)
- Moretta Fenton "Molly" Reilly (1974)
- Stanley George Reynolds (2009)
- James Armstrong Richardson (1976)
- Robert "Dick" Richmond (1995)
- Donald Howard Rogers (1988)
- James Lindsay Rood (1974)
- Frank Walter Russell (1994)
- Richard W. Ryan (2011)
- William John Sanderson (1983)
- John William Sandford (2013)
- Kenneth Foster Saunders (1997)
- Rayne Dennis Schultz (1997)
- Eugene Howard Schweitzer (1996)
- Herbert Walter Seagrim (1974)
- Murton Adams Seymour (1974)
- Beverley Strahan Shenstone (2016)
- John Gavin Showler (1974)
- Thomas William Siers (1974)
- Arthur George Sims (1974)
- Daniel Sitnam (2017)
- John Charles Sloan (1974)
- Elvie Lawrence Smith (1993)
- Frank Ernest William Smith (1998)
- Rogers Smith (2017)
- Ernest Walter Stedman (1982)
- Alexander Mackay Sutherland (1991)
- Claude Ivan Taylor (1985)
- Harold Rex Terpening (1997)
- Albert Ross Tilley (2006)
- Samuel Anthony Tomlinson (1974)
- Leonard John Tripp (1974)
- John Henry Tudhope (1974)
- Wallace Rupert Turnbull (1977)
- Percival Stanley Turner (1974)
- Joseph Pierre Romeo Vachon (1974)
- Archie Vanhee (1987)
- Joseph Armand Gerard Fernand "Fern" Villeneuve (2006)
- Maxwell William Ward (1974)
- Violet Milstead Warren (2010)
- Donald Netterville Watson (1974)
- Roland Burgess West (1974)
- William J. Wheeler (2011)
- Robert Allan White (1974)
- Dafydd R. Williams (2012)
- Thomas Frederic Williams (1974)
- Arthur Haliburton Wilson (1979)
- John Armistead Wilson (1974)
- Jack Fraser Woodman (1995)
- Walter "Babe" Woollett (2004)
- Jerauld George Wright (1974)
- Dennis Kestell Yorath (1974)
- Franklin Inglee Young (1974)
- Michael Zubko (2003)
- Janusz Zurakowski (1974)

== Belt of Orion ==
Belt of Orion Award of Excellence

The Belt of Orion Award for Excellence was founded by the Aviation Hall of Fame in 1988, to honour organizations, groups, societies or associations who have made outstanding contributions to the advancement of aviation in Canada. Recipients include:

- 1974 Trans-Canada Airlines
- 1988 Air Line Pilots Association (ALPA)
- 1989 Air Cadet League of Canada
- 1990 Southern Alberta Institute of Technology (SAIT)
- 1991 Ontario Ministry of Natural Resources Aviation and Fire Management Branch
- 1992 Not Awarded
- 1993 Canadian Owners and Pilots Association (COPA)
- 1994 Canadian Forces Snowbirds
- 1995 The Ninety-Nines (Organization of Women Pilots)
- 1996 Not Awarded
- 1997 Not Awarded
- 1998 Canadian Forces Search and Rescue (SAR)
- 1999 British Columbia Aviation Council
- 2000 Royal Canadian Mounted Police Air Division
- 2001 Canadian Aviation Historical Society
- 2002 Canadian Aviation Artists Association
- 2003 Not Awarded
- 2004 Canadian Aeronautics and Space Institute (CASI)
- 2005 Aeronautical Engineering Test Establishment (AETE)
- 2006 International Aviation Training Institute (IAMTI)
- 2007 Canadian Business Aviation Association (CBAA)
- 2008 Canadian Warplane Heritage Museum (CWHM)

== Affiliations ==
The Museum is affiliated with: CMA, CHIN, Virtual Museum of Canada, and Canadian Aeronautical Preservation Association (CAPA).

== See also ==
- History of aviation in Canada
- North American aviation halls of fame
