= Caywood =

Caywood may refer to:

- Caywood, Ohio, United States
- Mount Caywood, Palmer Land, Antarctica

== People with the surname ==
- Alfred Beebe Caywood (1910–1991), Canadian aviator
- Betty Caywood (born c. 1930), American sportscaster
- Keith Caywood (1919–1992), American football coach
- Les Caywood (1903–1986), American football player
- Star Caywood (1915-1968), American politician
- Thomas Caywood (1919–2008), American computer scientist

== See also ==
- Caywood Estates, Alberta, Canada
- Cawood (disambiguation)
