= Robert McNair =

Robert McNair may refer to:

- Bob McNair (1937–2018), American businessman, owner of the Houston Texans team in the National Football League
- Robert Evander McNair (1923–2007), American politician, governor of South Carolina
- Robert "Buck" McNair (1919–1971), Canadian Second World War flying ace
