= Erskine Leigh Capreol =

Canadian aviator

- Born: September 17, 1898; Ottawa, Ontario, Canada
- Died: January 7, 1963 (aged 64); Baie-D'Urfé, Quebec, Canada
- Occupation(s): Flying instructor, test pilot, bush pilot, aviation executive

Erskine Leigh Capreol (September 17, 1898 – January 7, 1963) was a Canadian aviator.

== Career ==
Born in Ottawa, Ontario on September 17, 1898, Erskine Leigh Capreol enlisted on adulthood in the Canadian Army, serving with various battalions of the Canadian Expeditionary Force in France until he completed cadet training at Oxford, England and, in 1917, joined the Royal Flying Corps (RFC). A flying instructor, he was left dependent on a cane by an aircraft accident that required a year and a half stay in a hospital. He was not certified medically fit to fly until 1927, seven years after taking work at the American Bank Note Company at Ottawa. He joined the Royal Canadian Air Force at Camp Borden, Ontario as a flight instructor for slightly over a year before he took work at de Havilland Aircraft of Canada Limited as chief test and demonstration pilot, in charge of testing and displaying new aircraft. In 1934, he became General Manager and Chief Pilot of Capreol and Austin Airways, formed by J.A.M. and Charles Austin.

With this company, he flew chartered flights into northern Ontario and Quebec, but only a year later returned to testing and demonstration, for Noorduyn Aviation Limited, Montreal, Quebec. He performed the first flight test of the Noorduyn Norseman, the first Canadian bushplane designed to withstand harsh Canadian flight conditions. While on loan from Noorduyn, he also tested the first Lysander aircraft built at National Steel Car, Malton, Ontario and was involved with the first flight of the North American Yale trainer. When he tired of flying, he became manager of Dorval Airport. He died at Baie D'Urfe, Quebec on January 7, 1963.

== Honours and legacy ==
- Canada's Aviation Hall of Fame (1981)
