= Nicholas Byron Cavadias =

Greek-Canadian aerospace administrator (1929–2023)

- Born: 8 February 1929; Galgaun, India
- Died: 12 August 2023 (aged 94); Kingston, Ontario, Canada
- Occupation(s): Engineer, administrator
- Spouse: Juliet Cavadias
- Children: 4 children, 7 grandchildren

Nicholas Byron Cavadias (8 February 1929 – 12 August 2023) was an Indian-born Greek-Canadian engineer and aeronautic administrator known for his contributions to flight simulation.

== Early years ==
Nicholas Byron Cavadias was born on 8 February 1929 in Galgaun, India, but relocated to Greece with his Greek parents during childhood. He attended the University of Southampton and the London City and Guilds Institute as an engineer. Specializing in the application of electronics to aviation, Cavadias began his career at TAE Greek National Airlines in 1946 as a radio engineer before becoming a ground radar specialist with the Royal Air Force in 1953. In 1956, he relocated to Canada, where he took a position with Montreal-based avionics company Canadian Aviation Electronics Ltd.(CAE).

== CAE years ==
In the early 1960s, Cavadias became Project Manager at CAE of a project to produce a flight simulator for the CF-104 Starfighter. CAE thrived from the success of this and earlier flight simulation projects, branching out. In 1961, CAE Electronics GmbH was established in Germany to handle simulations. A parent organization, CAE Industries was formed in 1963, under which CAE Electronics GmbH and CAE Electronics were overseen. Cavadias rose in ranks at CAE Electronics, which had dwindled considerably after the division of the company, becoming Manager of Manufacturing in 1963, Vice President of Operations in 1967, Executive Vice President in 1973 and President in 1975. During Cavadias' tenure as leader, CAE Electronics expanded again, with an international market share growth in commercial airline flight simulators from less than 3% to more than 60%. The company also became a strong presence in the military flight simulator market in Germany. In 1990, Cavadias became Senior Vice President, Aerospace and Electronics Group, of the parent company CAE Industries. He retired in 1994.

In addition to his work in CAE, Cavadias contributed in other areas during his CAE years. He served as Director of the Aerospace Industries Association of Canada, was a member of the Consultative Committee on the Electronics Industry for the Canadian government and the Advisory Board for Science and Technology for the New Brunswick government.

== Honours and legacy ==
In 1985, Cavadias was given an honorary Doctor of Laws degree by Concordia University. He has twice been singled out for his contributions by representations of the United States government, in 1988 by the Commander in Chief of the USAF Military Airlift Command for outstanding contribution to their C-5 simulator program and in 1990 by NASA for outstanding cooperation between government and industry on the Crew Station Research program. In 1990, the Canadian Aeronautics and Space Institute bestowed on him a C.D. Howe Award. In 1996, he was inducted into Canada's Aviation Hall of Fame.

== Death ==
Cavadias died on 12 August 2023, at the age of 94.
