= Aviation Hall of Fame =

Aviation Hall of Fame may refer to:

- Canada's Aviation Hall of Fame
- International Air & Space Hall of Fame, San Diego, US.
- National Aviation Hall of Fame, Dayton, US.

== See also ==
Category:Aviation halls of fame
