= Neil J. Armstrong =

Canadian aviator

- Born: April 15, 1920; Alvinston, Ontario, Canada
- Died: November 23, 1994 (aged 74); Antarctica
- Occupation: Aviator

Neil J. Armstrong (April 15, 1920 – November 23, 1994) was a Canadian aviator. He was killed in 1994 with his son, Corcoran, when the Twin Otter they were in crashed into an Antarctic iceberg.

== Awards and honours ==
- Canada's Aviation Hall of Fame in 1973
- Order of Icarus in 1974
- Yukon Territory Order of Polaris
