= Punch Dickins =

Canadian aviator

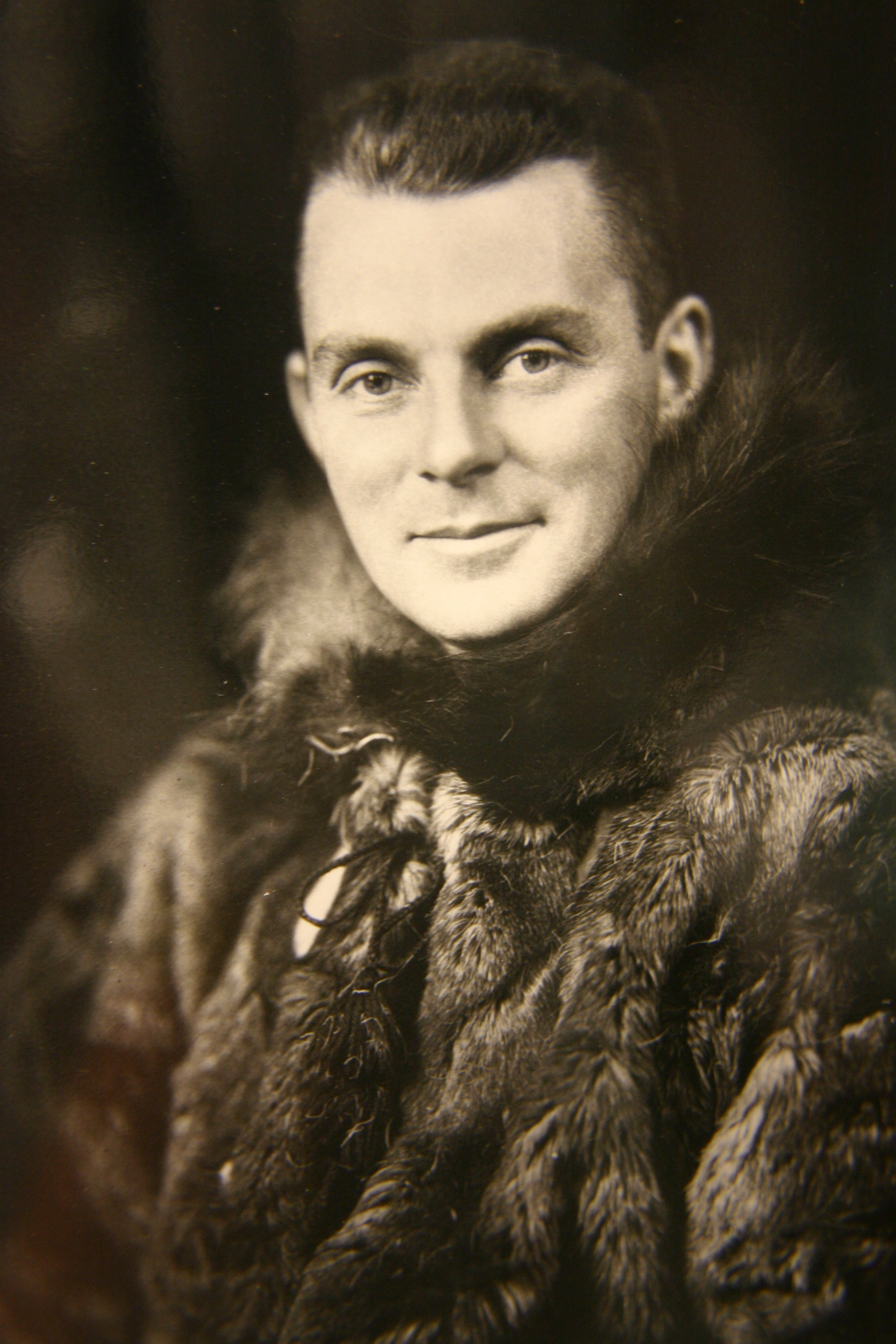
- Dickins c. 1927
- Born: Clennell Haggerston Dickins; 12 January 1899; Portage la Prairie, Manitoba, Canada
- Died: 3 August 1995 (aged 96); Toronto, Ontario, Canada
- Occupation(s): Aviator, salesperson, spokesperson
- Spouse: Connie Dickins
- Children: 3

Clennell Haggerston "Punch" Dickins OC OBE DFC (12 January 1899 – 2 August 1995) was a pioneering Canadian aviator and bush pilot. Northern Indigenous Canadians called him "Snow Eagle", northern Europeans called him "White Eagle", while the press dubbed him the "Flying Knight of the Northland".

== Early years ==
Clennell Haggerston Dickins was born in Portage la Prairie, Manitoba and moved with his family to Edmonton, Alberta in 1909, when he was ten years old. The nickname, "Punch" came at an early age, reputed to be either when his brother, Francis, first called him Punch, according to Punch's son, John. Other reports say his maternal Aunt Nell dubbed him a fat little punch because his clothes wouldn't stay over his tummy. In interviews in later years, Dickins said he was not sure how he acquired the nickname, but admitted he had it longer than he could remember.

== First World War ==
Punch went to Peace Avenue school, a temporary school. In 1914 when he was 16, he enrolled in mechanical engineering at the University of Alberta, but when war broke out he quit to enlist as an infantryman in the Canadian Army, and served with the 196th Western Universities Battalion for one year as a company clerk. While in Europe he transferred to the Royal Flying Corps. Punch transferred from the 21st Reserve Unit to the RFC School of Instruction at the Acton Aerodrome, northwest of London.

Punch became a bomber pilot and served with No. 211 Squadron, Royal Air Force, flying from the front line base at Petit Synthe, France. Serving from May 1918 until February 1919, Punch emerged as a skilled and able pilot of the Airco DH9 medium bomber. It was claimed he eventually shot down seven enemy aircraft, earning the distinction of being one of the few bomber pilots to become an ace. What is certain is that he and his gunner claimed an enemy aircraft that broke up on 4 November 1918 (shared with 2nd Lt W G Watson/Sgt. C Lamont). He attributed his success to having a skilled gunner, 2nd Lt. Jock Adam, and the pair of them worked as a team. Dick and Adam would complete 73 missions by the end of the war. Punch was awarded the DFC (Distinguished Flying Cross) at age 20 in 1919. The dispatch that accompanied the award noted that 2nd Lt. C.H. Dick had completed aerial assignments under fire with "persistence and gallantry".

== Inter-war years ==
Punch Dickins remained in France until March 1919 before he was demobilized and released from military service. He opted to return home with elements of the Canadian Expeditionary Force returning from an expedition to Siberia. Reaching Edmonton in May 1919, Dickins enrolled briefly in engineering at the University of Alberta until he received an offer from General Motors.

By 1921 Punch had been awarded a Commercial Air Pilot's Certificate (No.161) as well as the Air Engineer's Certificate (No. 213) by the Air Board. He joined the new Royal Canadian Air Force in 1924 and served until 1927. As a veteran, Punch was assigned the rank of Flying Officer. One of his first duties was to prepare a report for the Edmonton Post Office on the use of aircraft as mail carriers. As a test and demonstration pilot, he was charged with the service introduction of the new Armstrong Whitworth Siskin fighter.

Leaving the military for civil aviation, he was one of the first pilots to join Western Canada Airways, operating in Manitoba and Northern Ontario. He flew the first aircraft on the prairie airmail circuit of Winnipeg, Regina, Calgary, Edmonton, Saskatoon, and Winnipeg. Soon, he and the bush pilots were also establishing a new frontier – the North. His wife, Connie, wrote a revealing account of their life in the north, I Married a Bush Pilot.

Punch Dickins became a legend in the Arctic; flying more than 1,000,000 miles across the uncharted North, often in treacherous weather conditions, with few landing strips, unreliable weather reporting and navigation aids nearly useless -as flying so close to the magnetic north pole made compass navigation unreliable. He invariably used dead reckoning and hand-drawn maps to plot his way across the north of Canada.

Dickins was responsible for a number of landmark flights. He flew one of the first aerial surveys of Canada in 1928 in a Fokker Super Universal (G-CASK). On 23 January 1929, Dickins delivered the first airmail to the Northwest Territories. Despite this early success Western Canada lost the government airmail contract to Commercial Airways, which had its own famous bush pilot in Wop May. He was also the first pilot to fly along the Arctic coastline, the first to fly over the Barren Lands in the Northwest Territories, and the first to fly the full 2,000 mile length of the Mackenzie River, which he covered in two days. In 1930 he flew the first prospectors into Great Bear Lake where they discovered uranium, later required for the Manhattan Project. In 1936 Punch conducted a 10,000 mile air survey of northern Canada.

== Second World War ==
Prior to the Second World War Dickins became a general superintendent for CPR airline division. When war came Punch Dickins again entered the military, this time as the head of the Atlantic Ferry Command, which flew combat aircraft to Britain during the early years of the war. After 1942 Dickins emerged as one of the leading exponents of the British Commonwealth Air Training Plan. His involvement was one of the reasons why the organization was able to train many thousands of combat fliers in Canada. Punch also managed six flight training schools, due to his status as manager. He finished the war years as a vice-president of Canadian Pacific Airlines before joining de Havilland Canada Aircraft Ltd.

== Post-Second World War ==
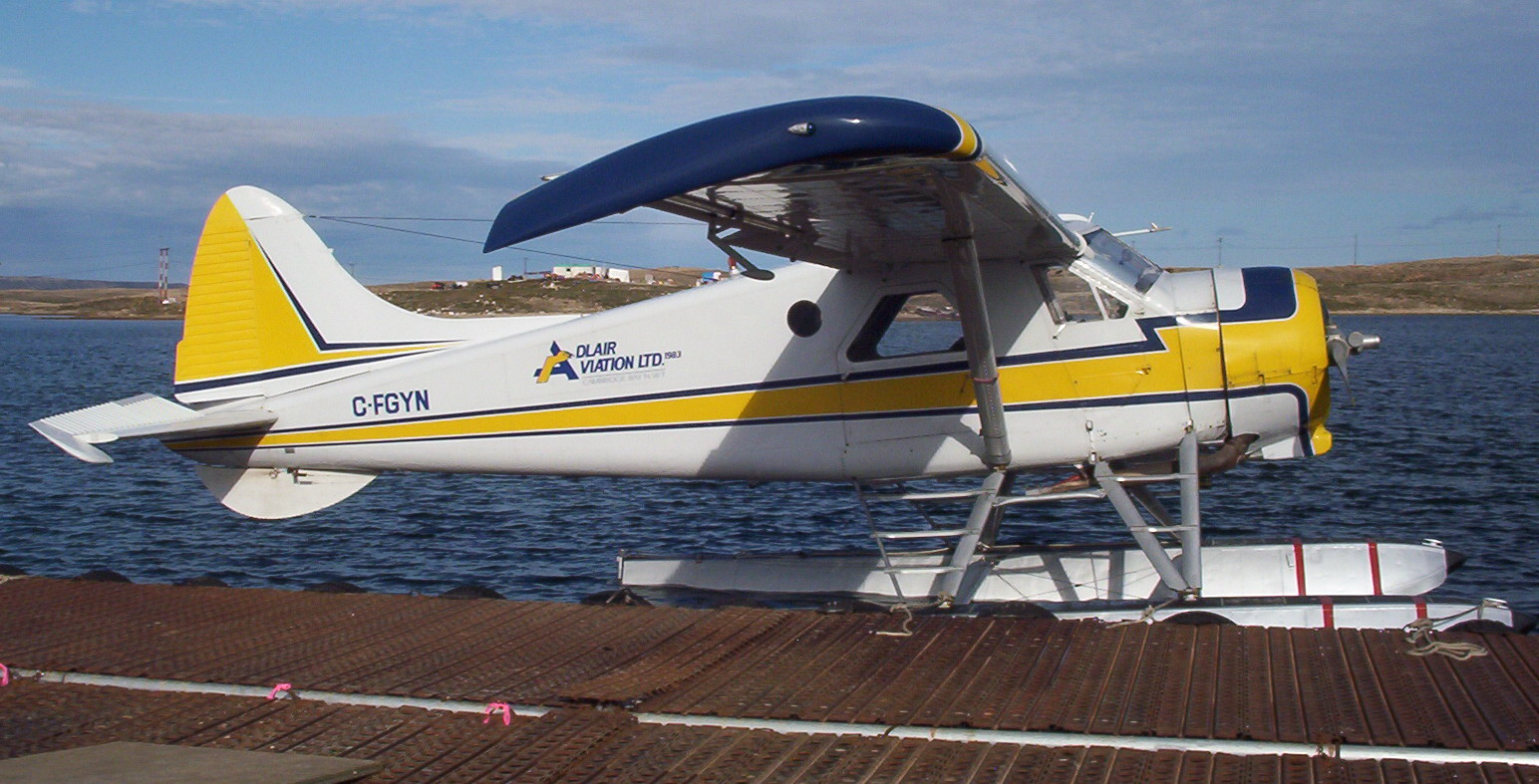
C-FGYN Adlair Aviation Ltd. de Havilland Beaver (DHC2) Mk.I on floats

In 1946 the de Havilland Canada company surveyed 80 veteran Canadian bush pilots to advise on specifications of a future utility transport for use in Northern and Arctic conditions. Punch provided input ranging from recommending an all-metal airframe, and the location of the battery removal hatch to providing doors on both sides of the fuselage for ease of docking. After consultation with company executives, Dickins joined the de Havilland Aircraft Company as a consultant. His expertise was called upon as the postwar design of the Chipmunk trainer came into fruition as a production aircraft. In 1947, as Director of Sales of de Havilland Canada, Punch was instrumental in launching the Beaver bushplane.

Arguably his greatest legacy to bush flying was his contribution to the family of de Havilland Canada STOL (Short Takeoff and Landing) aircraft that have become the world leaders in this field. The DHC series of light transport aircraft for use in the north were heavily influenced by Dickins' experience and advice. The rugged Beaver and its offspring, the Otter, Twin Otter, Caribou, Buffalo and Dash 7 aircraft were employed worldwide in conditions as harsh and varied as tropical jungles and the Antarctic.

Dickins continued working with de Havilland Canada for many years, becoming their sales agent. He travelled all over the world and was responsible for thousands of sales both in civil and military markets.

== Honours and legacy ==
Near the end of his career, Punch Dickins was honoured as a pioneer of Canada's rich aviation heritage. In the North, Punch was christened "The Snow Eagle" and "Canada's Sky Explorer".

Punch Dickins was the second recipient of the Trans-Canada (McKee) Trophy in 1928. He was named an Officer of the Order of the British Empire in 1935, an Officer of the Order of Canada in 1968, and the Government of Canada named him one of the most outstanding Canadians of the country's first century. He was also a co-founder of the Canadian Aviation Hall of Fame and was inducted as a member in 1974.

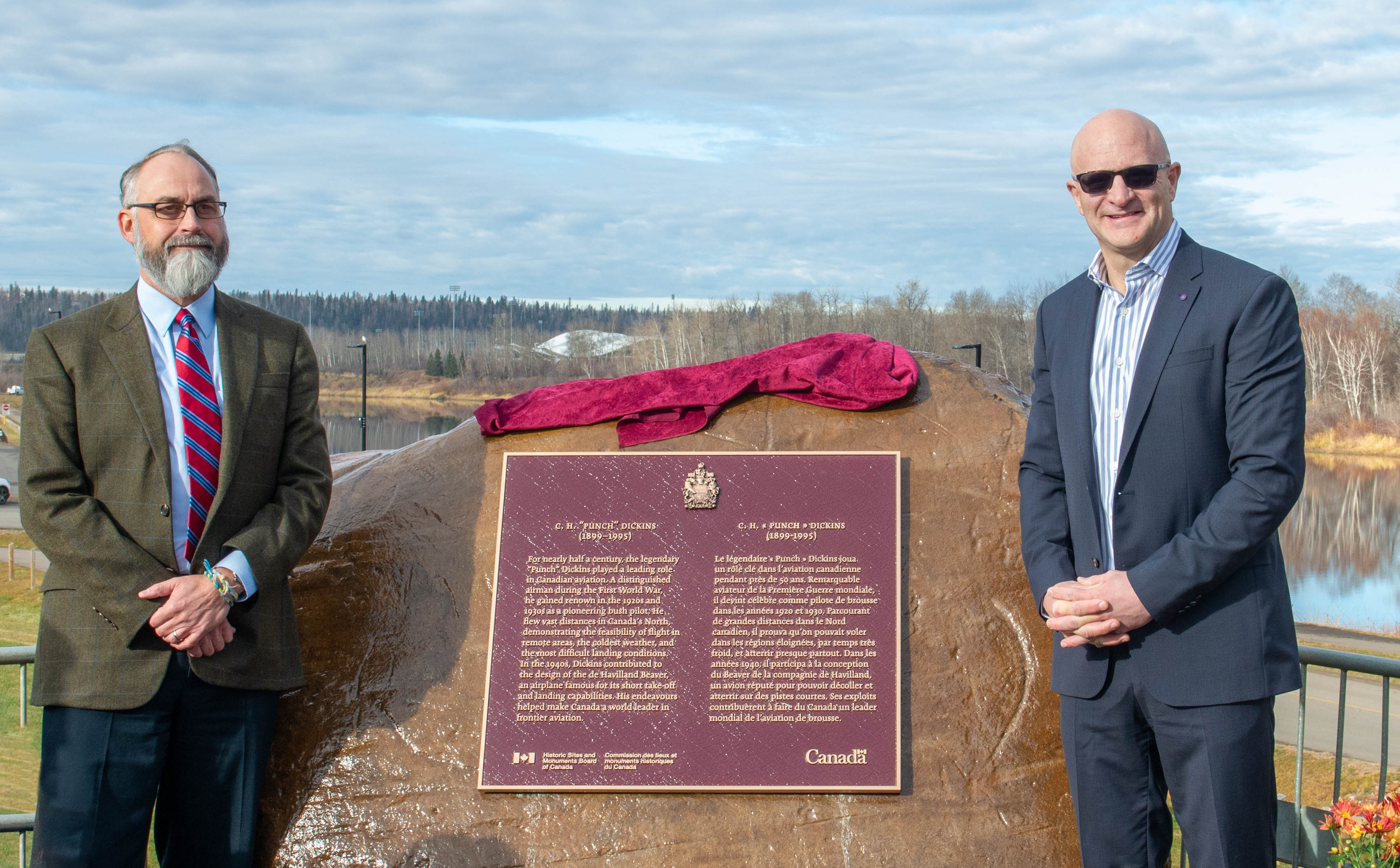
Dr. Joe Anderson of the Historic Sites and Monuments Board of Canada and Mayor of the Regional Municipality of Wood Buffalo Don Scott dedicate a commemorative plaque and monument to aviation pioneer, C. H. "Punch" Dickins in Fort McMurray, AB

He flew until he was 78 years old. His death in Toronto, Ontario in 1995 marked one of the last of many First World War pilots who had shaped aviation in Canada.

- Trans-Canada (McKee) Trophy, 1928
- Officer of the Order of the British Empire, 1935
- Order of Icarus, 1967
- Officer of the Order of Canada, 1968

Following his death, his ashes were scattered by his son John from an aircraft along the MacKenzie River. The aircraft was flown by another legendary bush pilot, Max Ward.

A neighbourhood and school in Fort McMurray, Alberta are named Dickinsfield in honour of Punch Dickins. There is also a neighbourhood and school in Edmonton, Alberta named in honour of Punch Dickins.

The Punch Dickins archive is located at the Bruce Peel Special Collections Library at the University of Alberta.

Dickins Street at the Yellowknife airport is named after him.

A commemorative plaque honouring Punch Dickins now resides at Snye Point Park in Fort McMurray.

In 2019, Punch Dickins was featured on a Canada Post stamp as part of the "Canadians in Flight" series.
