= Wilfred Leigh Brintnell =

Canadian aviator

- Born: August 27, 1895; Belleville, Ontario, Canada
- Died: January 22, 1971 (aged 75); Edmonton, Alberta, Canada
- Occupation: Bush pilot
- Spouse: Carolyn Brintnell
- Children: Robert Leigh & Ann

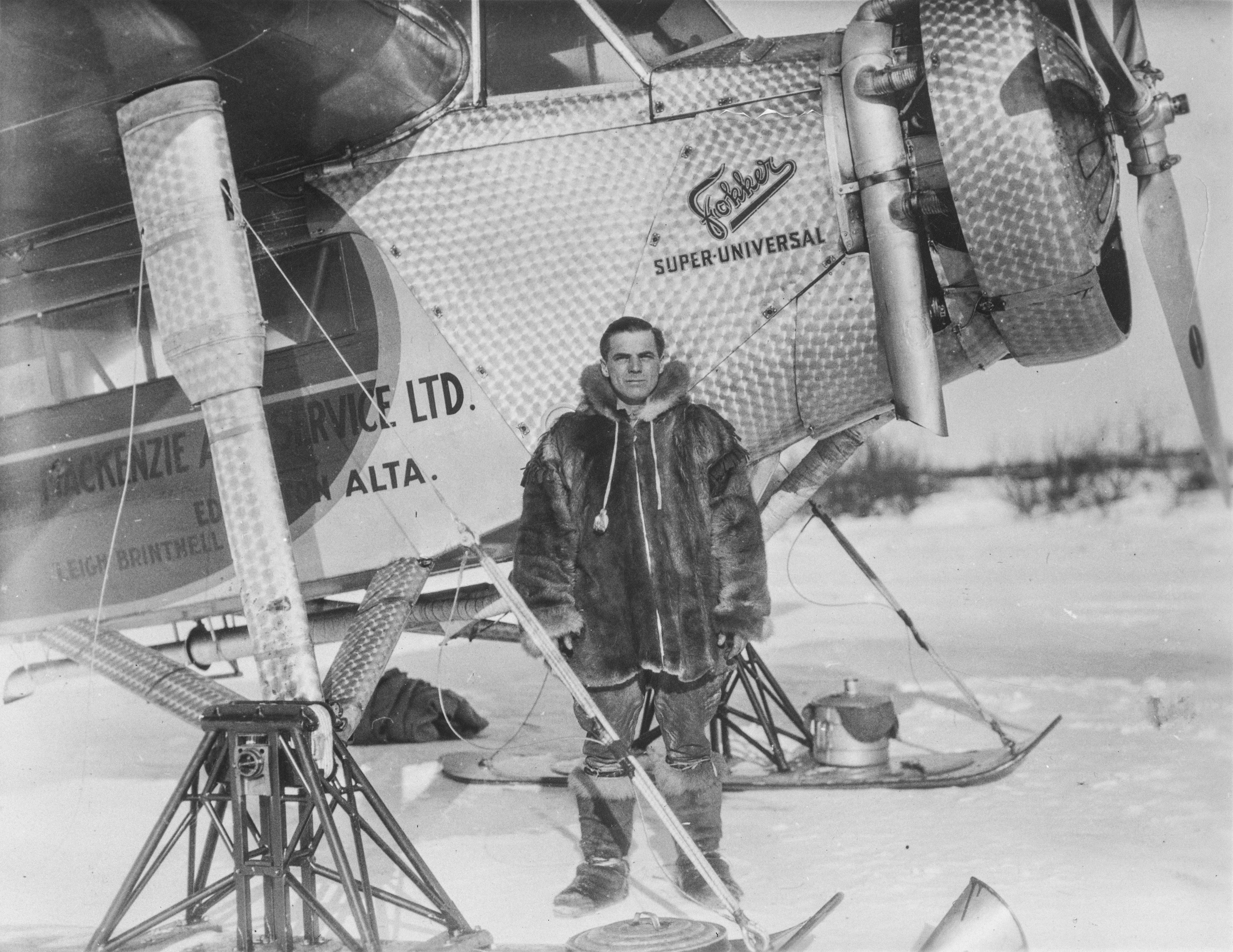
Fokker Super Universal in Alberta, Canada 1935. The person is famous Canadian aviator Leigh Brintnell

Wilfred Leigh Brintnell (August 27, 1895 – January 22, 1971) was a pioneering Canadian aviator.

Born at Belleville, Ontario, Brintnell joined the Royal Flying Corps (RFC) in Canada in 1917. A pilot, Brintnell instructed until his discharge in 1919, for the RFC at Fort Worth, Texas; the Royal Air Force at Camp Borden, Ontario; and the RAF in Upavon, England.

After the war, he served as a commercial pilot with various operations. In 1927, he took employment with Western Canada Airways, quickly rising to the position of manager. He was involved in several historic events between 1928 and 1931, including piloting the first multi-engined return flight Winnipeg, Manitoba to Vancouver, British Columbia; the first flight around Great Bear Lake; and the first over-the-mountains flight from Aklavik, Northwest Territories to Dawson City, Yukon Territory. He also flew a historic 9,000-mile trip from Winnipeg across the Northwest Territories to Alaska.

He left Canadian Airways Limited, the successor company of Western Canada Airways, soon after being appointed assistant general manager in 1931 so that he could form the Mackenzie Air Service Limited in Edmonton, Alberta. He sold the company to the Canadian Pacific Railway Company in 1940, but stayed on to help expand that business into Canadian Pacific Airlines.

During World War II, he became a manager at Aircraft Repair Limited, overseeing the effort to maintain Canadian military aircraft, for which service he was created an Officer of the Order of the British Empire (O.B.E.) Civil in 1946.

After the war, he managed Northwest Industries Limited at Edmonton, then in 1952 operated an aerial photographic business, Arctic Air Lines.

He died at Edmonton, Alberta in 1971.

He was inducted into Canada's Aviation Hall of Fame in 1976. The neighbourhood of Brintnell in the Horse Hills area is named after him.
