= Stan Turner (RAF officer) =

Canadian World War II pilot

Group Captain Stan Turner DSO DFC*
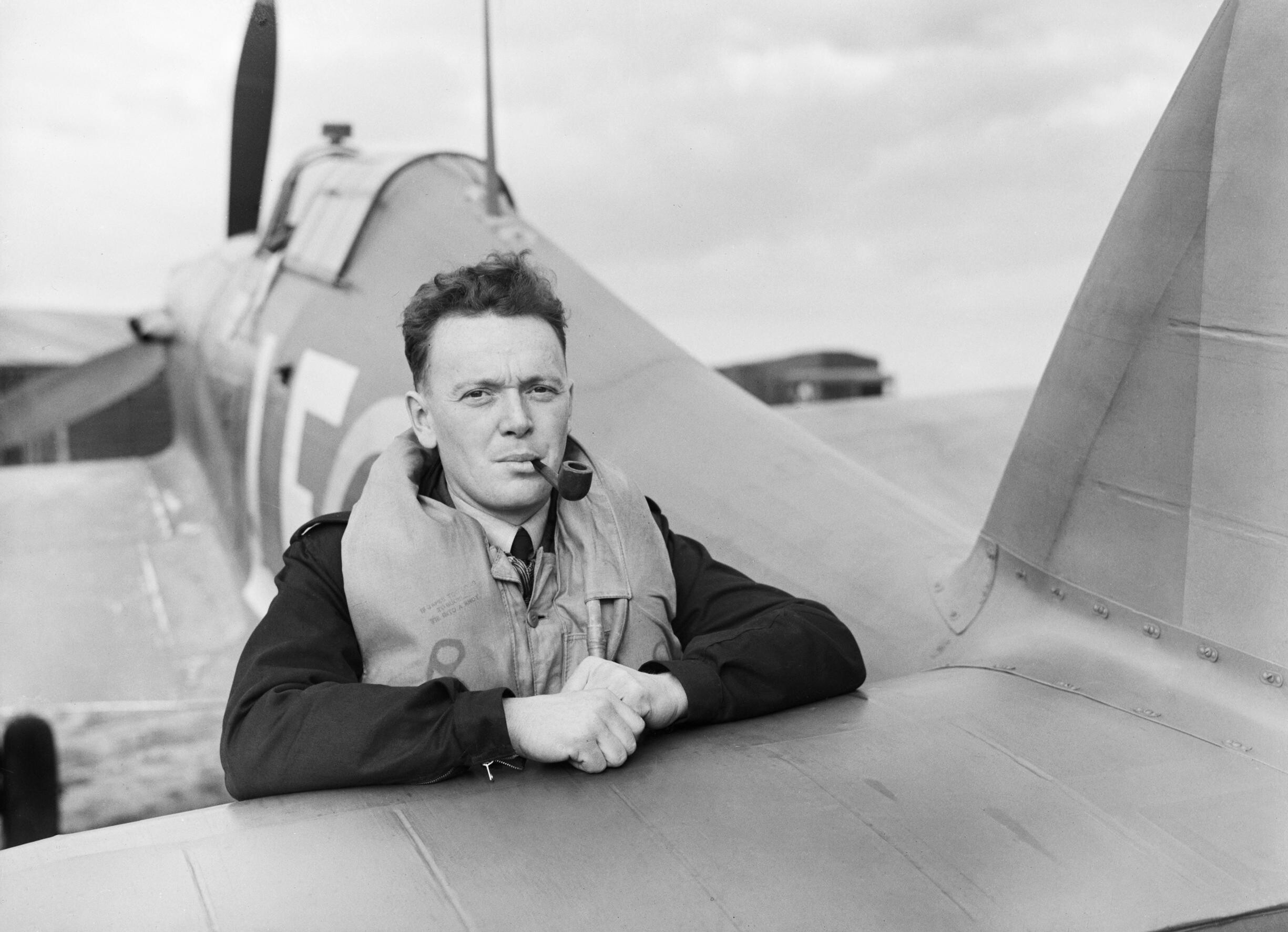
- Turner rests on the tail elevator of his Hawker Hurricane Mk I after landing at Fowlmere, near Duxford in Cambridgeshire, September 1940
- Born: 3 September 1913; Ivybridge, Devon, England
- Died: 23 July 1985 (aged 71); Ottawa, Ontario, Canada
- Military career
- Allegiance: Canada; United Kingdom
- Branch: Royal Canadian Air Force; Royal Air Force
- Service years: 1938–1965
- Rank: Group Captain
- Nickname: Stan
- Commands: No. 127 Wing RCAF; No. 249 Squadron RAF; No. 411 Squadron RCAF
- Conflicts: Second World War: Battle of France; Battle of Britain; Siege of Malta
- Awards: Distinguished Service Order; Distinguished Flying Cross & Bar

Percival Stanley Turner, DSO, DFC & Bar (3 September 1913 – 23 July 1985) served with the Royal Air Force and the Royal Canadian Air Force during the Second World War. He holds the record of the most combat hours flown of any Canadian pilot.

== Early years ==
Turner's parents emigrated to Toronto, Ontario, when he was young. While studying engineering there, he joined the Royal Canadian Air Force auxiliary.

== Second World War ==
In 1938 Turned joined the Royal Air Force, completing his pilot training right at Britain's entry to the Second World War. He was posted to fly Hurricanes with No. 242 Squadron RAF. It was over Dunkirk that he scored the first of his 14 aerial victories he would post during the war. During the Battle of Britain he was awarded the Distinguished Flying Cross (DFC).

After the Battle of Britain, Turner was posted to No. 145 Squadron RAF in June 1941, where he transitioned over to the Supermarine Spitfire Mk II. During this time, Johnnie Johnson remarked that Stan was a "Fearless and great leader" of his squadron. In October 1941 he was awarded a Bar to his DFC while flying over France again.

With a short rest in between, Turner was then given command of No. 411 Squadron RCAF. His posting there spurred many requests to be transferred to the squadron, a notable one accepted was that of Robert Wendell "Buck" McNair. In 1942, he was then transferred to the command of No. 249 Squadron RAF on Malta at the height of the Siege of Malta. In 1943, he became wing leader of 244 Wing, fighting in Italy. In 1944, he was promoted to group captain and commanded No. 127 Wing RCAF.

Stan Turner was also involved in some other interesting and remarkable events during the war. He flew escort for the mission that was agreed to by the Germans to drop an artificial leg to Douglas Bader. Turner and Bader were good friends, despite a rocky start when Bader took over command of the Canadian pilots who had survived the Battle of France. Bader won over Turner and the other Canadians by generously replacing their kit they had lost in France from his personal stores, not to mention by demonstrating his flying skills.

Turner was inducted into Canada's Aviation Hall of Fame in 1974.

== In popular culture ==
Turner was portrayed by Lee Patterson in Reach for the Sky, the 1956 film biography of Douglas Bader.
