= Cawood (disambiguation) =

Cawood is a village in North Yorkshire, England.

Cawood may also refer to:

- Cawood, Kentucky, a census-designated place
- Cawood Bridge, a swing bridge which spans the River Ouse (York) in North Yorkshire, England
- Cawood Castle, a Grade I listed building in Cawood, the village in North Yorkshire, England
- Cawood sword, a medieval sword discovered in the River Ouse
- Cawood, Wistow and Selby Light Railway, railway in Yorkshire

== People ==
=== Family name ===
- Charlie Cawood (born 1988), English musician, composer and music journalist
- Dorothy Cawood (1884–1962), Australian WWI nurse awarded Military Medal
- Elize Cawood (1952–2020), South African actress
- John Cawood (printer) (1514–1572), English printer
- John Cawood (hymnwriter) (1775–1852), English clergyman and hymnwriter
- John C. Cawood (fl. 1926–1929), Australian administrator
- Sarah Cawood (born 1972), English television presenter

=== Given name ===
- Cawood Ledford (1926–2001), American sportscaster

== See also ==
- Alleyn-et-Cawood
- Arkholme-with-Cawood
