= William Brenton Boggs =

Canadian businessman (1918–2011)

- Born: December 18, 1918; Douglas, Arizona, United States
- Died: January 7, 2011 (aged 92)
- Education: McGill University
- Awards: Order of Canada; Order of the British Empire

William Brenton Boggs IV, OC OBE (December 18, 1918 – July 7, 2011) was a pioneering Canadian leader in military and commercial aviation.

== Early years ==
Born in Douglas, Arizona, United States, on December 18, 1918, William Brenton (Bill) Boggs relocated to Noranda, Quebec, with his parents in 1927. He graduated from McGill University with, mechanical engineering, and became an Engineering Officer of the Royal Canadian Air Force in 1940. During his World War II service, he notably served as Senior Engineering Officer of 331 Wing of Wellington bombers dispatched to Tunisia, North Africa to support the Allied landings in Sicily and Italy. He was appointed to the Order of the British Empire (O.B.E.) for those contributions in 1944.

== Civilian career ==
Boggs' early civilian career included positions with Trans-Canada Airlines (1945–1950) and Canadair (1950–1957) before he joined Can-Car, a Hawker Siddeley Canada subsidiary and became Hawker Siddeley's vice president. In 1965, he became President of de Havilland Canada (DHC). During this term, he was involved in developing the 30-seat De Havilland Canada Dash 7 commuter aircraft. He then became President and eventually Chairman of Canada Systems Group (CSG), and, in 1983, President and CEO of The Canadian Data and Professional Service Organization.

Boggs was invited back to DHC in 1984, as Chairman, President and CEO, when that company was being prepared for privatization. When the Boeing Company bought DHC in 1986, Boggs became Vice Chairman of Boeing Canada. In 1987, he became Chairman of Field Aviation Holdings Inc. He remained there until he retired in 1995.

== Honours and legacy ==
In addition to being made an Officer of the Order of the British Empire in 1944, Boggs was invested as an Officer into the Order of Canada in 1988. He became a Fellow of the Canadian Aeronautics and Space Institute (CASI) in 1967 and served twice as Chairman of the Aerospace Industries Association of Canada (AIAC) (1967–68; 1987–88). In 1983 he was named a Fellow of the Canadian School of Management. In 2003, he was inducted into Canada's Aviation Hall of Fame.
