= Larry Milberry =

Canadian aviation author and publisher (born 1943)

Larry Milberry (born 1943) is a Canadian aviation author and publisher.

Milberry is a lifelong aviation enthusiast whose first book, Aviation in Canada, was published by McGraw-Hill in 1979. Now an aviation classic, this book was written over a decade while he worked as a high school teacher in the Toronto District Catholic School Board. He ended his teaching career to start CANAV Books, his one-man publishing operation, in 1980. He has since authored, co-authored or edited 21 books on Canadian aviation history, including many of the best-known reference books on the subject.

Milberry's research has taken him to all parts of Canada and to many overseas destinations. Although never a pilot, he has flown in more than 100 types from the Ford Trimotor to the Noorduyn Norseman, C-130 Hercules, CF-18 Hornet, Pitts Special, Sikorsky Skycrane and the giant Antonov 124.

His contribution to aviation in Canada was recognized in 2004, when he was inducted into Canada's Aviation Hall of Fame. Milberry is an honorary Snowbird and a long-time member of the Canadian Aviation Historical Society.

Milberry lives in The Beaches in Toronto, Ontario. He has four children.
