= Albert William Baker =

Canadian aviator and aeronautical engineer

- Born: May 4, 1918; Montreal, Quebec, Canada
- Died: March 6, 2008 (aged 89); Cambridge, Ontario, Canada

Albert William Baker (May 4, 1918 – March 6, 2008) was a Canadian aviator and aeronautical engineer. He was inducted into Canada's Aviation Hall of Fame in 2000.
