= Robert William Bradford =

Canadian curator, aviation artist (1923–2023)

- Born: December 17, 1923; York Township, Ontario, Canada
- Died: May 25, 2023 (aged 99); Ontario, Canada
- Occupations: Artist; museum curator and director

Robert William Bradford CM (December 17, 1923 – May 25, 2023) was a Canadian aviation artist who was instrumental in the founding of the Canada Aviation Museum.

== Biography ==
Born December 17, 1923 in York Township, Ontario, Robert William Bradford and his twin brother, James, enlisted together in the Royal Canadian Air Force when they were 18. Bradford trained on the de Havilland Tiger Moth and Avro Anson, but he never saw operational duties. He was injured in a crash while awaiting assignment, which required several months of hospitalization. After the war, Bradford became an aviation illustrator first for A. V. Roe Canada Limited in 1949 and then, in 1953, for de Havilland Aircraft of Canada.

While serving as Chief Illustrator for de Havilland, in 1961, Bradford drew the attention of Ken Molson, curator of the recently formed Canada Aviation Museum. Molson commissioned Bradford to produce a series of historical aviation pieces. Bradford produced eighteen images depicting historically significant aircraft and events, and, in 1966, was hired as the museum's Assistant Curator. Eventually, Bradford succeeded Molson to the curator position.

At this time in the museum's history, the collection was housed in World War II-era hangars at Rockcliffe. In 1978, Bradford began collaborating with the new National Air Museum Society (Friends of the National Aviation Museum) to secure a new facility from the Federal Government. This was a project that continued over the next several years, as Bradford served in 1982 as Director of the National Museum of Science and Technology, the Aviation Museum's parent and returned in 1984 to the National Aviation Museum as Associate Director. Their efforts paid off, and the new facility opened at Ottawa's Rockcliffe Airport in 1988. That same year, Bradford was named Patron of the Canadian Aviation Historical Society. In 1989, the collection secure, Bradford retired from the Museum, but continued his career as a painter.

Bradford died in Ontario on May 25, 2023, at the age of 99.

== Legacy and honours ==
In addition to murals for the Museum, Bradford also produced sixteen Canadian postage stamps featuring historic aircraft as well as accepting commissions commemorating such events as the 50th anniversary of Alcock and Brown's trans-Atlantic flight, the first winner of the McKee Trophy "Doc" Oaks, and Billy Bishop's Victoria Cross winning aerial action. For his artistic achievements, in 1974 he became the first Canadian artist to receive the American Aviation Historical Society's Aviation Award. In 1982, he received the Paul Tissandier Diploma from the Fédération Aéronautique Internationale for his curatorial and artistic accomplishments. In 1989, he became a Member of the Order of Canada, and in 1996 he was inducted into Canada’s Aviation Hall of Fame.
