= Walter Chmela =

Austrian-born Canadian aviator (1926–2021)

Walter Frank Chmela
- Born: 28 May 1926; Vienna, Austria
- Died: 10 July 2021 (aged 95)
- Occupation(s): Engineer, aviator
- Spouse(s): Edith Chmela (deceased), remarried to Eva Chmela
- Children: Glenn Gary Walter Mathew Chmela

Walter Frank Chmela (28 May 1926 – 10 July 2021) was an Austrian-born Canadian aviator. He set many Canadian records in the field of soaring. He was a leading promoter of the sport of soaring in Canada.

== Biography ==
At age 14 he did his first solo glider flight and gained his Glider Pilot License in 1943. He studied engineering at the University of Vienna. Upon graduation he worked in the reconstruction. In 1950 he moved to Toronto, Canada.

After working in the engineering field for several years he formed his own company, Indesco international Ltd. He would operate this company until 1995.

When he arrived in Canada, Walter co-founded a gliding club. Because they needed tow pilots he gained a pilot's license and bought a Taylorcraft Auster. Later he founded the York Soaring Association in Toronto, funding much of the club including the land for the airfield, the hangars, gliders and tow planes. Walter was also instrumental in organizing gliding camps for the Canadian Air Cadets, more than 500 Cadets have benefited from these camps over the years.

Chmela died on 10 July 2021, at the age of 95.

== Gliding records ==
- Single Seat Absolute Altitude record, 12,449m (41,000'ASL), 1974
- Multi Seat Absolute Altitude record, 10,390m (35,000'ASL), 1975
- Multi Seat Speed Closed Circuit Out and Return record, 65kmph, 1976

== Awards and honours ==
- Paul Tissandier Diploma
- Canada's Aviation Hall of Fame 2006
