= James Tocher Bain =

Canadian engineer

- Born: 26 February 1906; Edinburgh, Scotland
- Died: 5 December 1988 (aged 82); Morrisburg, Ontario, Canada
- Occupation: Engineer

James Tocher Bain (26 February 1906 – 5 December 1988) was a pioneering Canadian engineer and also an inductee to Canada's Aviation Hall of Fame.
