= Max Ward (aviator) =

Canadian aviator (1921–2020)

Max Ward OC AOE
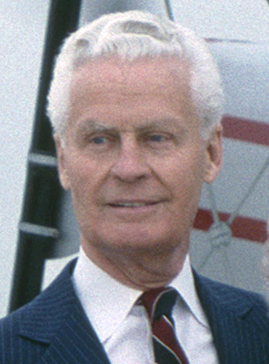
- Ward in 1989
- Born: Maxwell William Ward; 22 November 1921; Edmonton, Alberta, Canada
- Died: 2 November 2020 (aged 98); Edmonton, Alberta, Canada
- Occupations: Aviator, entrepreneur
- Spouse: Marjorie Doretha Skelton
- Children: 4

Maxwell William Ward OC AOE (22 November 1921 – 2 November 2020) was a Canadian aviator and founder of Wardair Airlines, at one time the third-largest air carrier in Canada.

== Early years ==
Ward was born on 22 November 1921 in Edmonton, Alberta. After completing Grade 11 at Victoria High School in Edmonton, and working at the Canadian National Railways, he joined the Royal Canadian Air Force (RCAF) in 1940.

== Aviation career ==
During the Second World War, Ward received his wings on 2 November 1941 and was assigned to training command as an instructor as part of the British Commonwealth Air Training Plan. He was stationed at various training bases for the duration of the war. While in Regina, he married Marjorie Doretha Skelton in 1944.

In 1946, after leaving the air force, Ward worked at a few other jobs before joining with Jack Moar, who was flying out of Yellowknife, Northwest Territories. Wishing to start a flying service to the north, Ward purchased a small de Havilland Fox Moth biplane to carry both passengers and freight, and started his first company, Polaris Charter Company. When he was unable to obtain a commercial flying business license on his own, he found a partner in George Pigeon and established Yellowknife Airways on a 50-50 basis, each contributing one aircraft. The skirmish with bureaucracy was the first of many that punctuated Ward's aviation career. This was a short-lived operation that was dissolved in 1949 when Pigeon sold his part of the company, forcing Ward to pay off his assets.

After two years in Alberta, during which he flew for Associated Airways, Ward worked in construction before returning in 1951 to Yellowknife to work for Associated Airways, but lost his job the next year.

=== Wardair ===
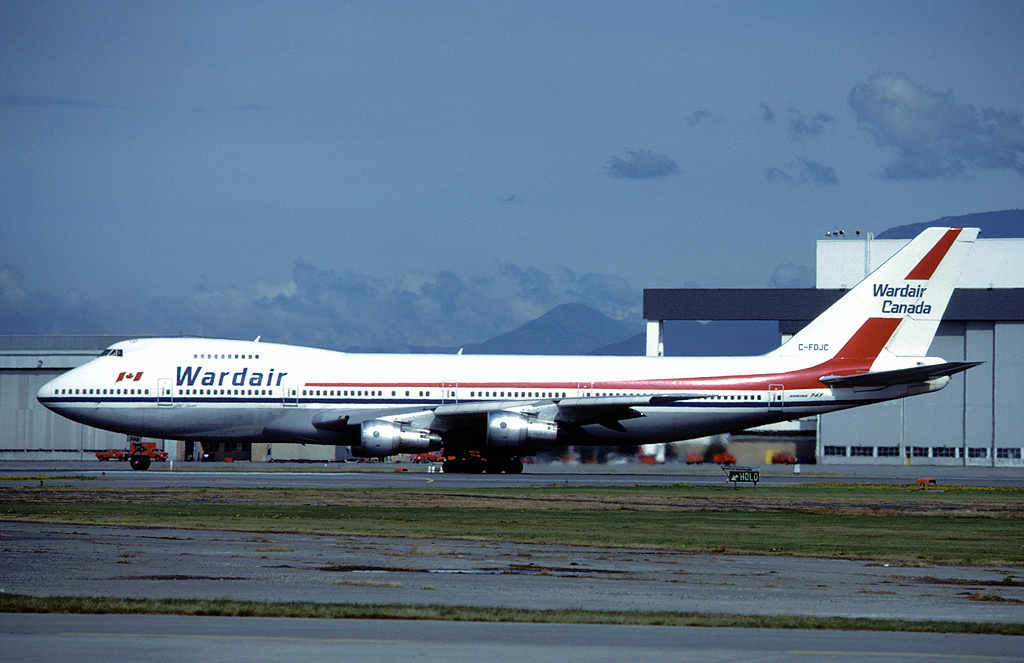
A Wardair Boeing 747-100 in 1983

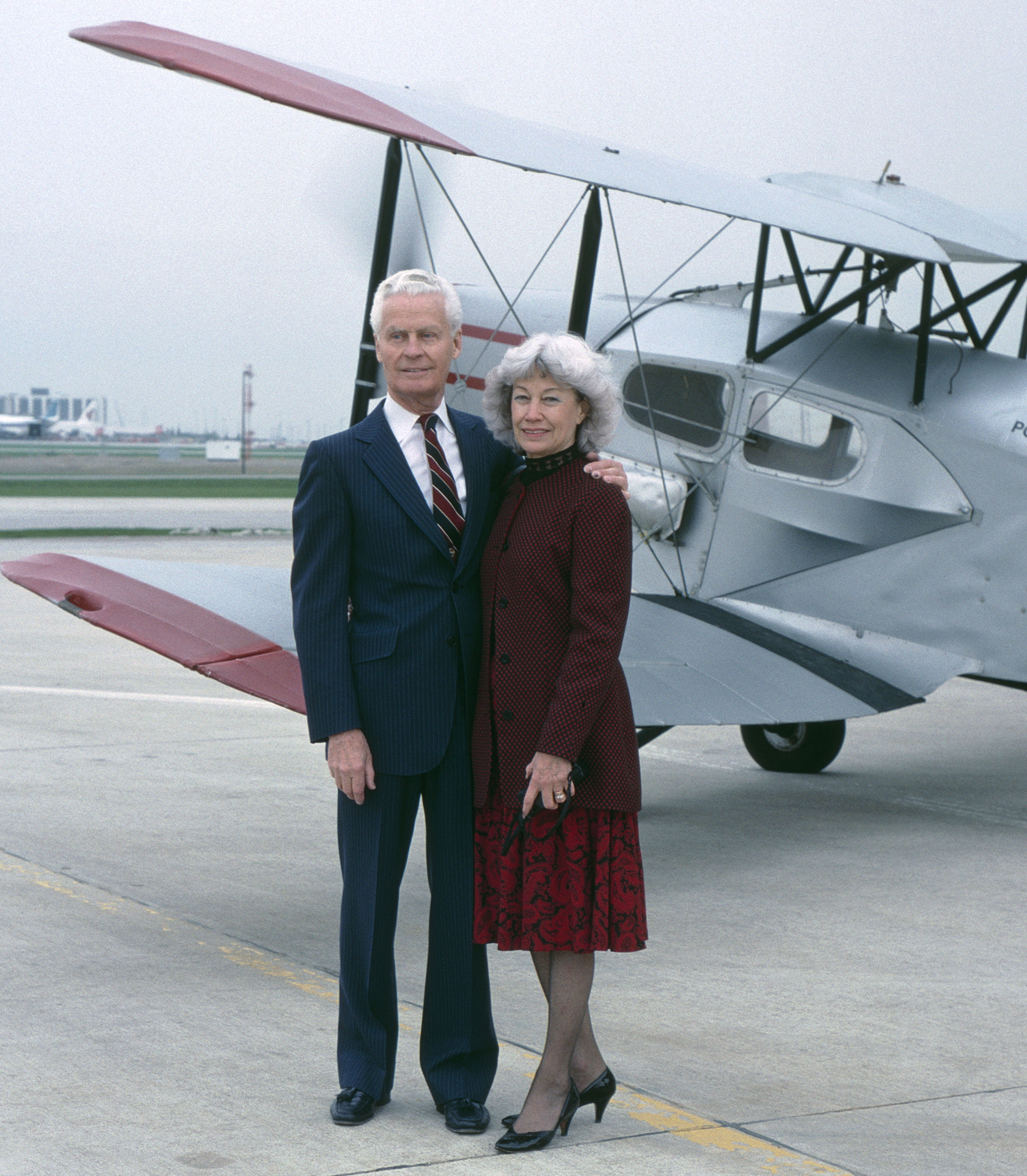
Max and Marjorie Ward pose in front of Fox Moth CF-DJB. This was the Fox Moth's last flight before going to the Canada Aviation and Space Museum in 1989.

After flying as a charter pilot for two years, Ward had the opportunity to get a license to operate his own commercial air service. With this Class 4B Charter license and a brand new de Havilland Canada DHC-3 Otter single-engine prop aircraft, Wardair was formed in May 1953.

Wardair operated within Canada until the 1960s, when Ward started looking at overseas charter as a business opportunity. He took Wardair public in 1961 but retained a controlling interest. By the mid-1970s, Wardair Canada had developed into Canada's largest international air charter carrier, and from 1984 flew scheduled routes.

After another 20 years of economic rollercoasters, competition from the likes of Air Canada, and Canadian Pacific Airlines and government regulation, Ward sold Wardair in 1989 to PWA International, the parent company of Pacific Western Airlines, which had also acquired CP Air. Wardair then became part of the new Canadian Airlines, which operated as Canadian Airlines International.

In 1991, Ward published his autobiography, The Max Ward Story.

== Awards and recognition ==
- International Northwest Aviation Council – Billy Mitchell Award, 1971
- Order of Icarus, 1973
- Trans-Canada Trophy (McKee Trophy), 1973
- Canada's Aviation Hall of Fame, 1974
- Officer of the Order of Canada, 1975
- Alberta Order of Excellence, 1989
- Canadian Business Hall of Fame, 1993
- Canadian Travel Hall of Fame, 2018
