= John Emilius Fauquier =

Royal Canadian Air Force officer

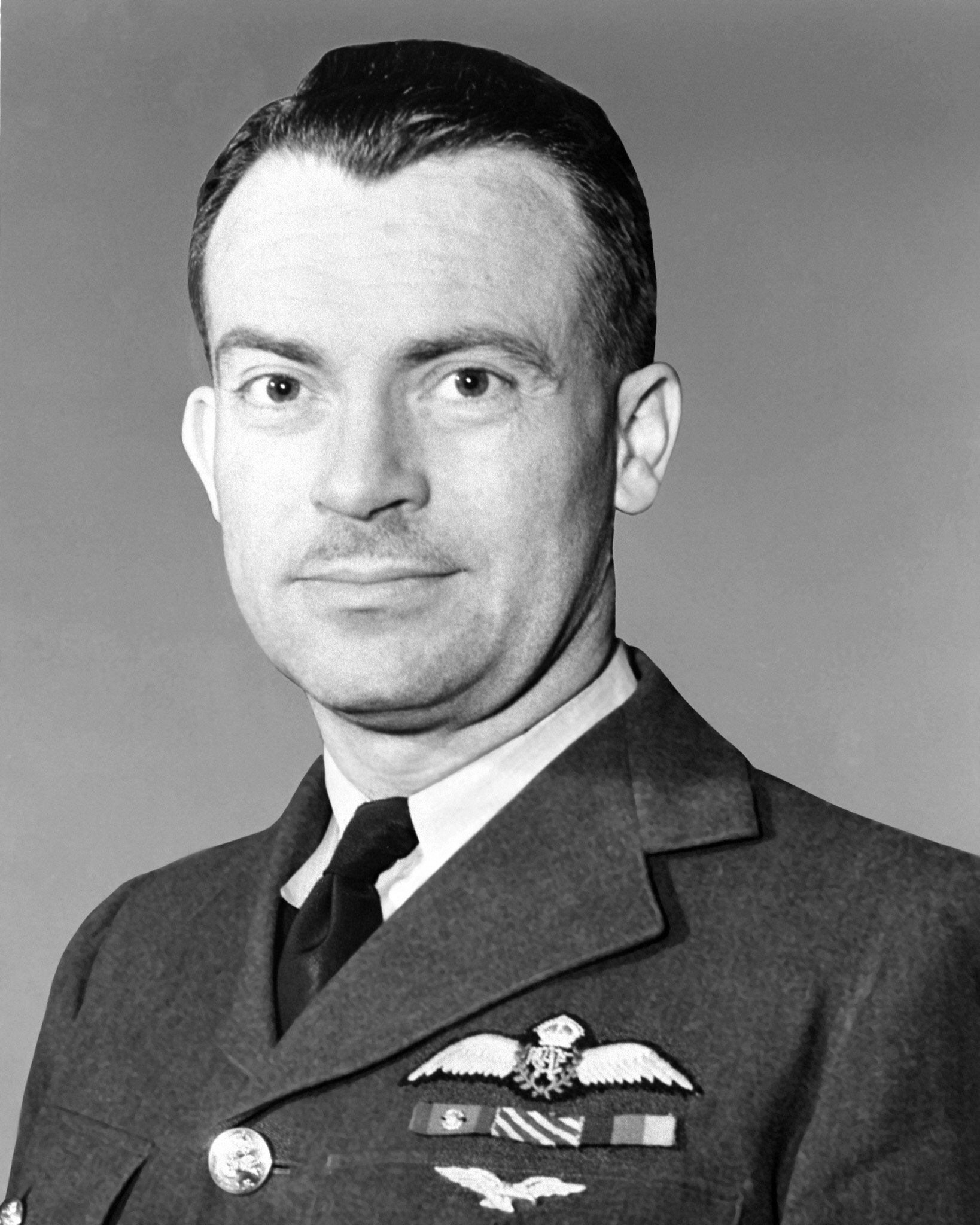
- Fauquier while CO of RAF Station Linton-on-Ouse UK, 1944
- Born: 19 March 1909; Ottawa, Ontario, Canada
- Died: 3 April 1981 (aged 72); Toronto, Ontario, Canada
- Military career
- Allegiance: Canada
- Branch: Royal Canadian Air Force
- Service years: 1939–1946
- Rank: Air Commodore
- Nickname: Johnny
- Commands: No. 405 Squadron RCAF (1942–1943); RAF Station Linton-on-Ouse (1944); No. 617 Squadron RAF (1944–45)
- Conflicts: Second World War: Operation Hydra
- Awards: Distinguished Service Order & Two Bars; Distinguished Flying Cross; Mentioned in Despatches

Air Commodore John Emilius Fauquier, DSO & Two Bars, DFC (19 March 1909 – 3 April 1981) was a Canadian aviator and Second World War Bomber Command leader. He commanded No. 405 Squadron RCAF and later No. 617 Squadron RAF (the Dambusters) over the course of the war. A bush pilot prior to the war, he joined the Royal Canadian Air Force as a flight instructor in 1939. He then joined 405 Squadron in 1941 and would fly operationally for the rest of the war, taking a drop in rank on one occasion to return to active command. During his three tours of operation he participated in Operation Hydra and dozens of other sorties over Europe.

== Early years ==
Fauquier was born at Ottawa, Ontario on 19 March 1909, educated at Ashbury College and then entered the investment business at Montreal, Quebec where he joined a flying club. After earning his commercial pilot's licence he formed Commercial Airways at Noranda, Quebec and prior to the Second World War had flown some 3,000 hours as pilot in command on bush operations.

== Second World War ==
He joined the Royal Canadian Air Force in 1939 as a flight lieutenant, completed an advanced course and served until mid-1941 as instructor of British Commonwealth Air Training Plan instructors. After a short period in England at a glider and paratrooper training center, he was posted to No. 405 Squadron RCAF. On returning in difficult weather conditions after bombing Berlin with the squadron on the night of 7 November 1941, he was forced to land his aircraft on a non-operational airfield, and as a result was temporarily suspected of being a spy by the Home Guard.

By February 1942, Fauquier had been promoted to acting wing commander and given command of the squadron. He was awarded the Distinguished Flying Cross (DFC) for gallantry. Shortly afterwards he was transferred from operations to the RCAF's Overseas Headquarters for staff duties. He then served a short term with No. 6 Group before once more taking command of No. 405 Squadron in February 1942.

During Operation Hydra in August 1943, a bombing raid on a German military research facility at Peenemünde, he acted as deputy master bomber, making 17 passes over the target. He was awarded the Distinguished Service Order (DSO) in September 1943, in part for his leadership during the raid. Soon after that raid he was promoted to acting group captain of that squadron, which had become a member of No. 8 (Pathfinder) Group.

During January 1944, he flew 38 sorties, completing his second tour of operations with No. 405 Squadron. He was then awarded a Bar to his DSO.

After promotion to acting air commodore—a rank precluded from operational flying—he was Mentioned in Dispatches in December 1944. He then voluntarily reverted to group captain so that he might begin a third tour of operations, this time as commanding officer of No. 617 Squadron RAF (the Dambusters squadron), which he led from December until the end of the war. Under his command the Dambusters conducted raids against submarine pens, viaducts and other targets.

With the end of the war in Europe, he was awarded a second Bar to his DSO for his command of 617 Squadron. Spencer Dunmore, a historian and novelist, remembers Fauquier in his history of Canada's Air Force during World War II:

There is no doubt that Fauquier was one of the toughest of commanders. He saw his job as getting every available aircraft on the target on every night of operations and had no patience with any incompetence or inefficiency that might compromise that goal. ... The ground crews thought the world of him, because he thought the world of them and never took them for granted, always remembering to take them bottles of beer or other treats if they had worked particularly hard. Many considered him Canada's greatest bomber pilot.

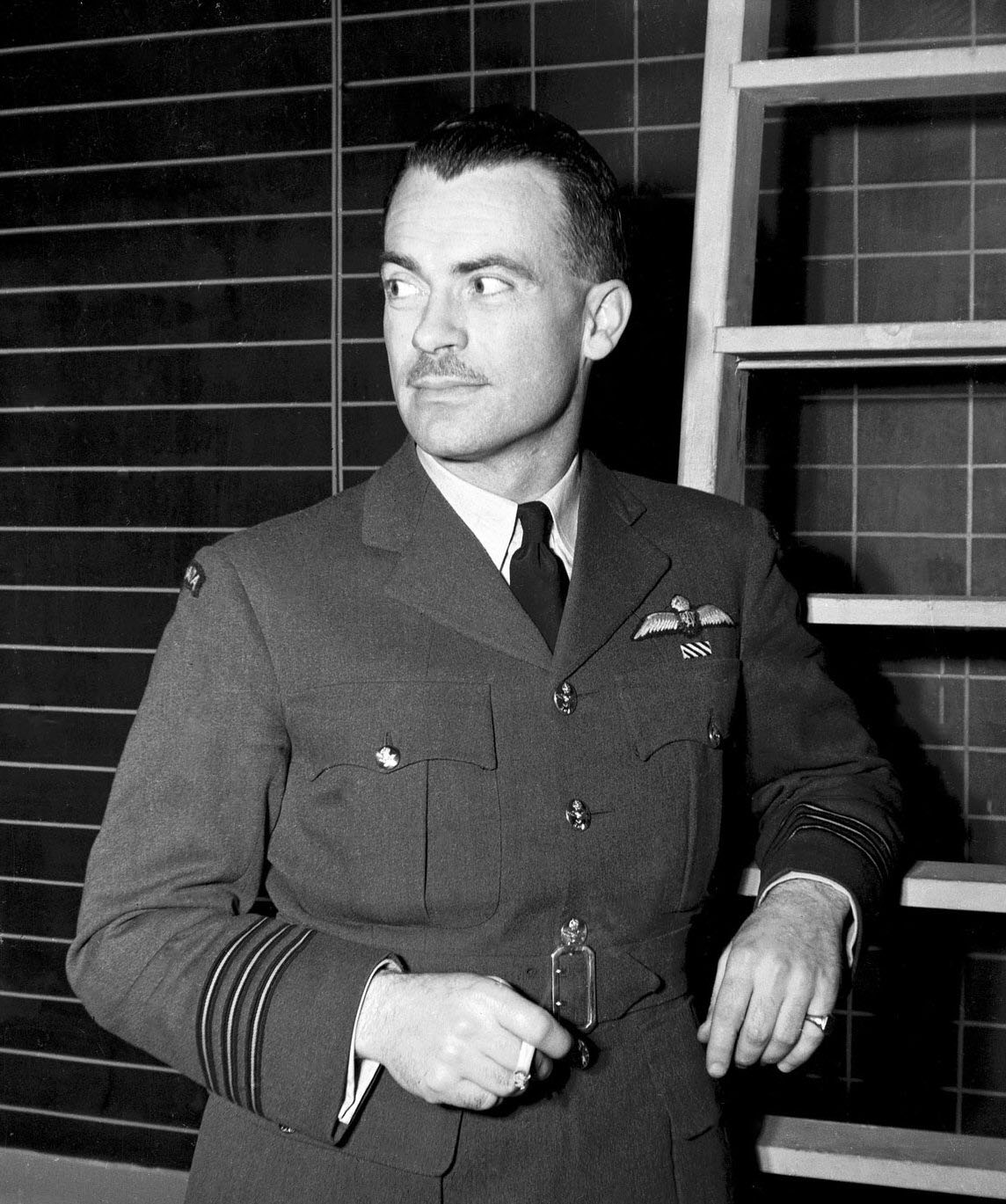
CO 405 RCAF Sqn UK - February 1942

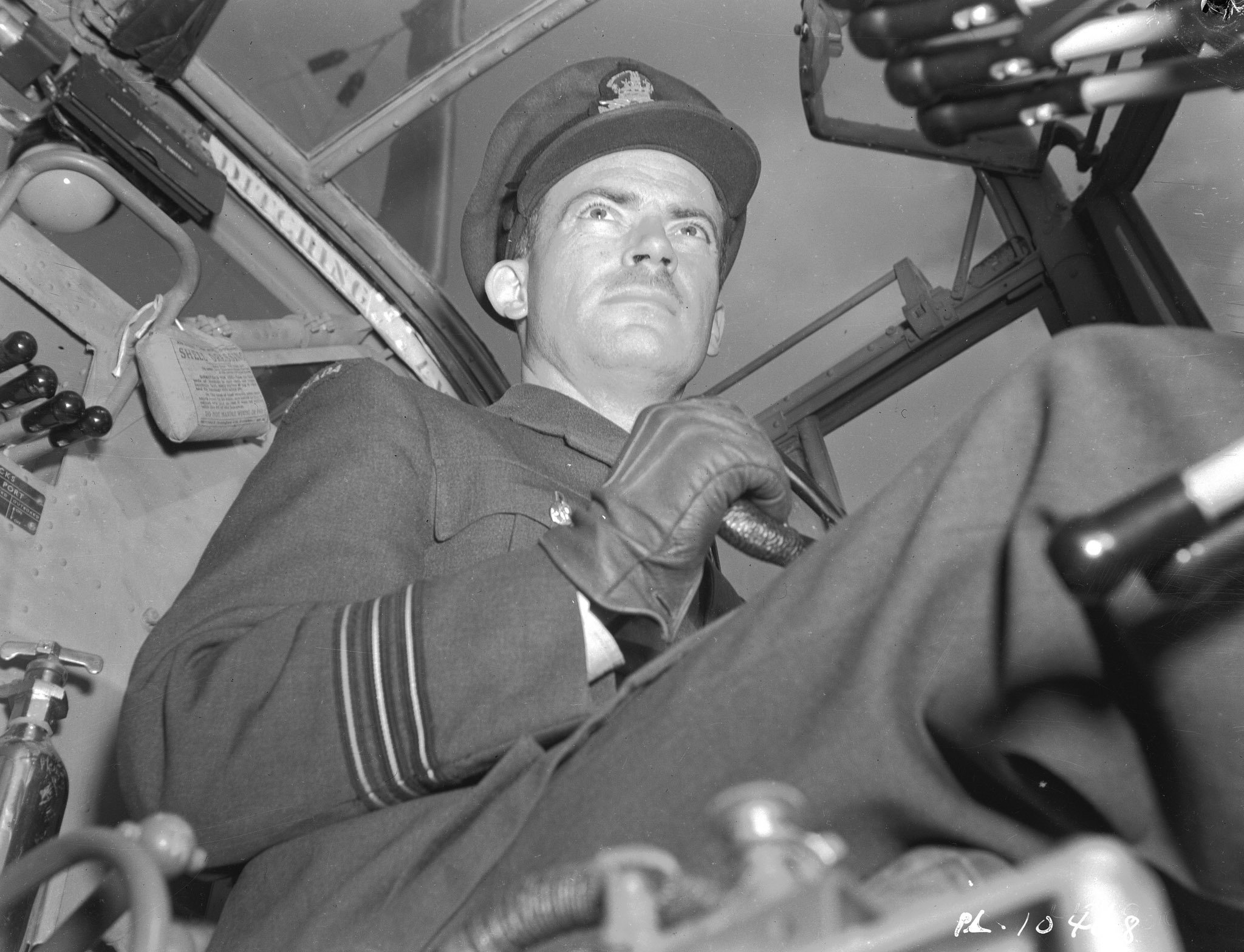
At the controls of his Halifax UK - February 1942

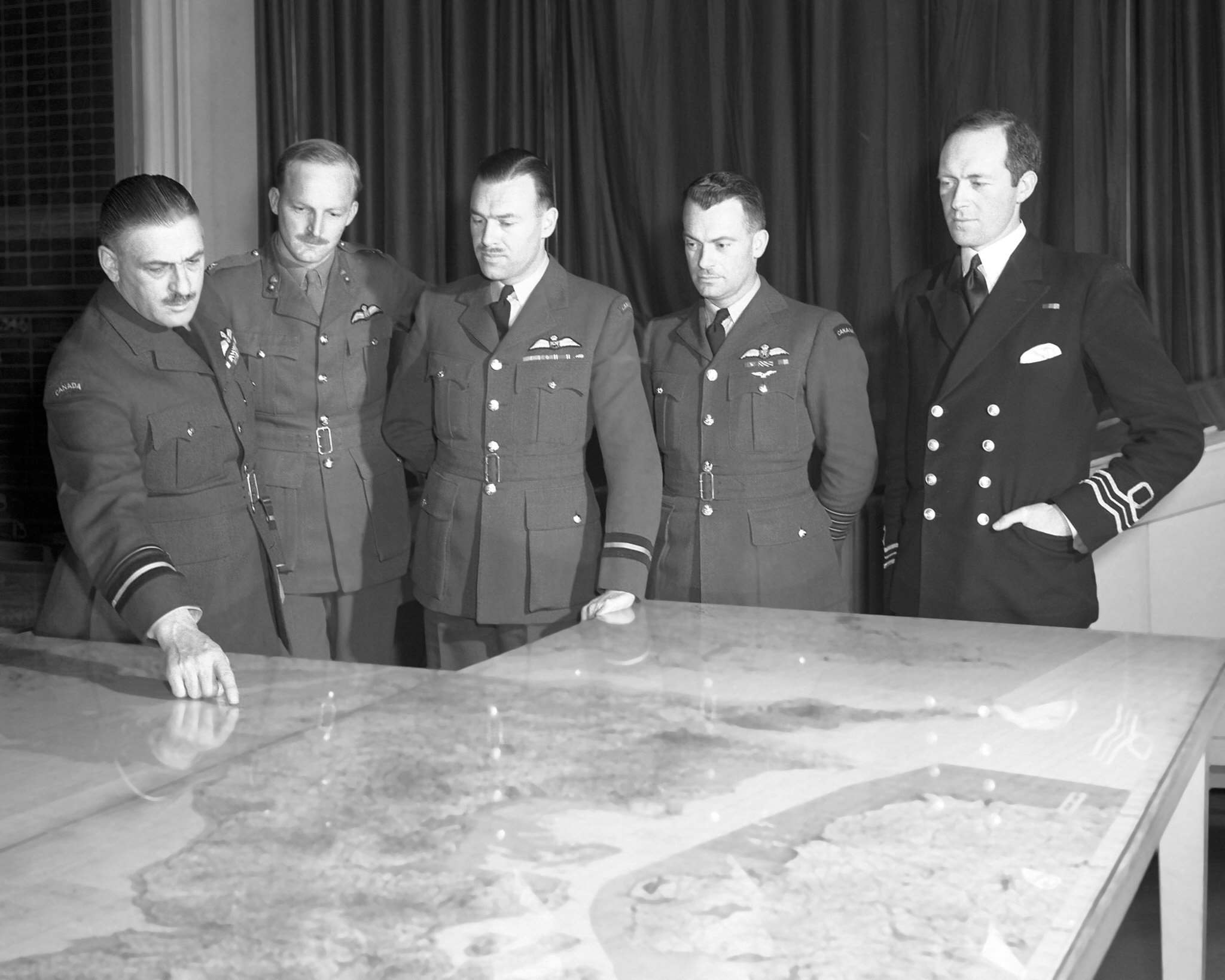
HQ 6 RCAF Bomb Group UK - May 1944

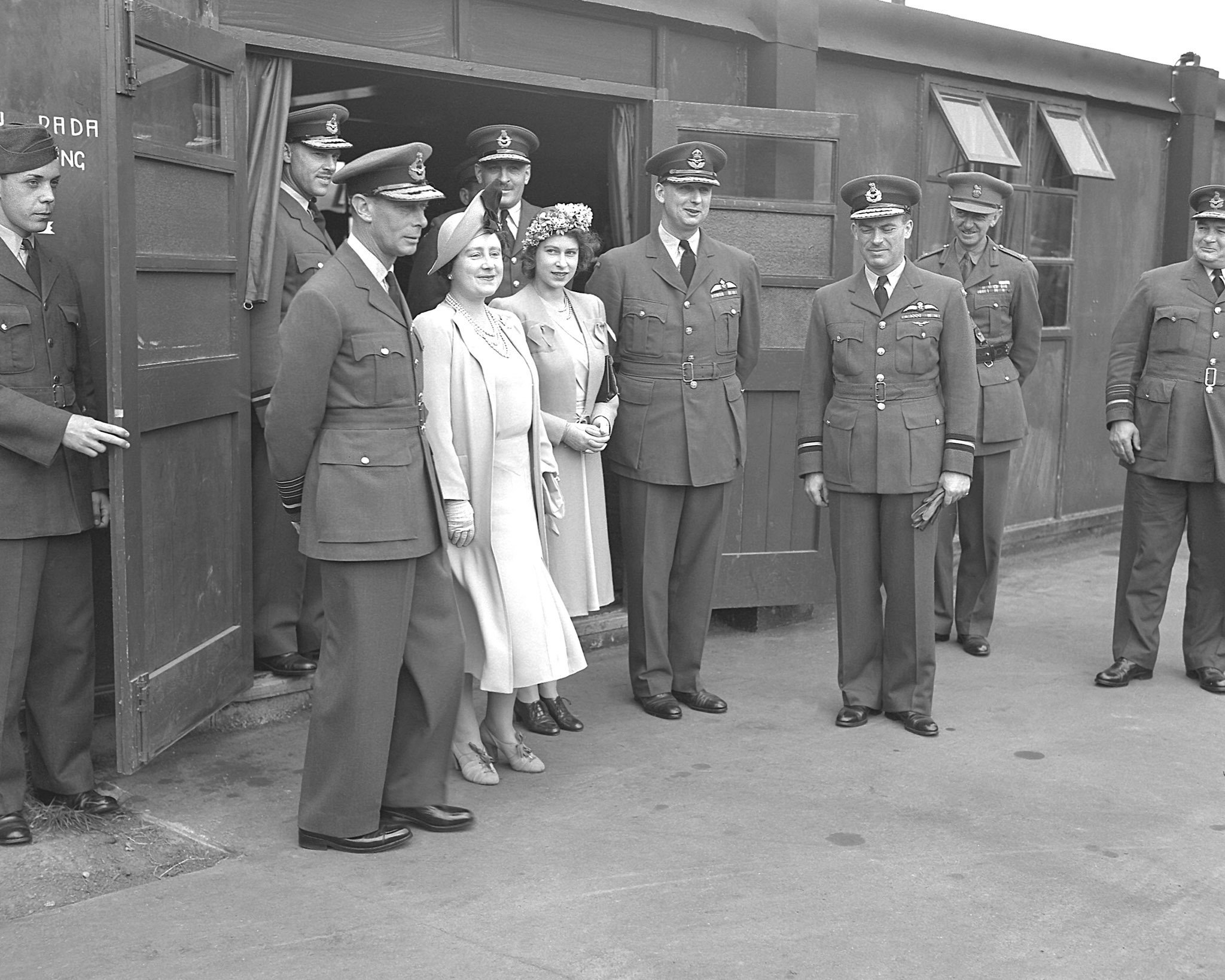
With King and Queen UK - August 1944

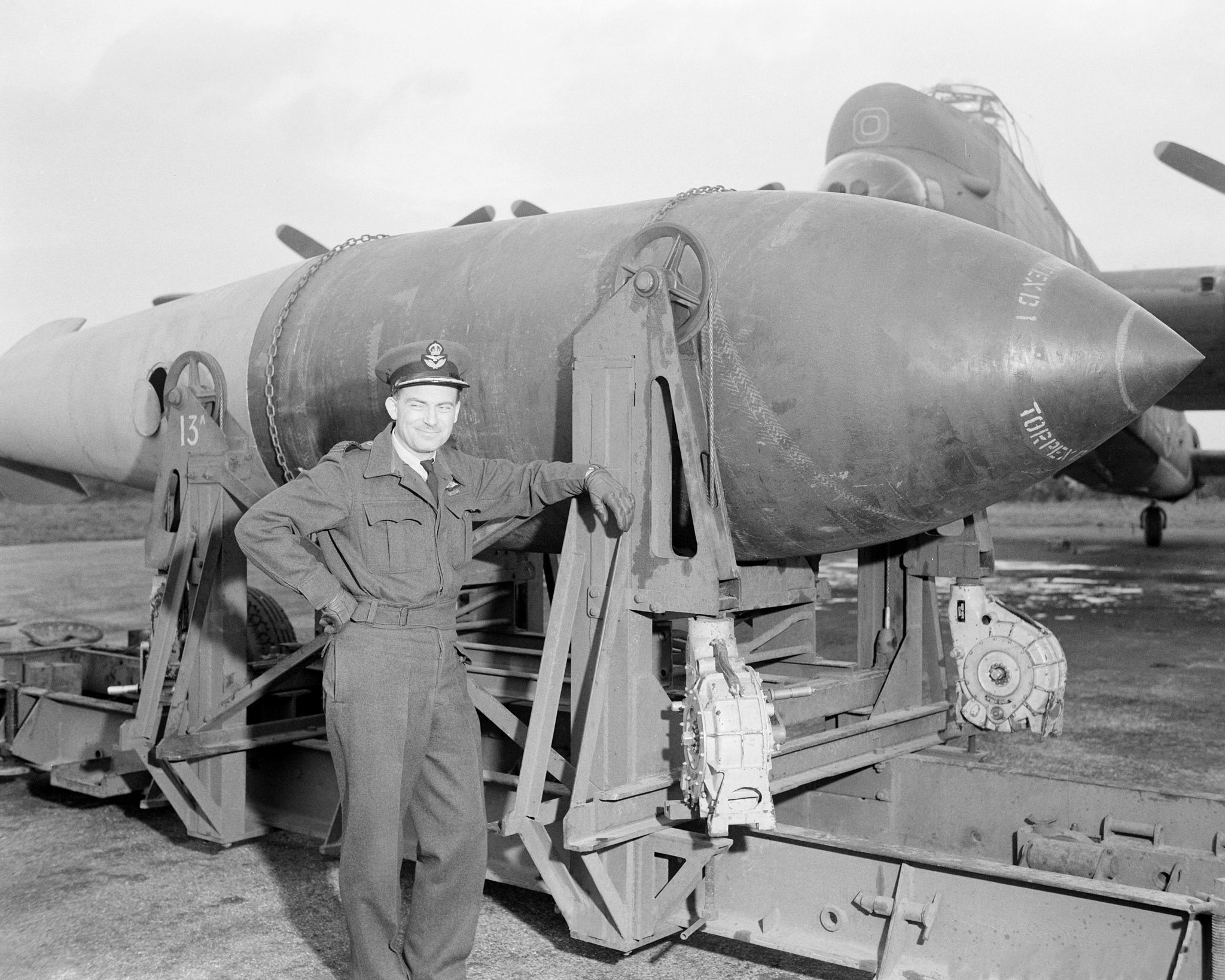
CO 617 RAF Sqn UK - June 1945

== Post-war ==
After the war Fauquier returned to private business. He was inducted into Canada's Aviation Hall of Fame in 1974.

On 4 July 1964, Fauquier traveled to Calgary, Alberta with the Minister of Defence Paul Hellyer, to observe the last official RCAF flight of an Avro Lancaster. This Lancaster, KB-976, was captained by F/L Lynn Garrison with F/L Ralph Langemann as his co-pilot. Other crew members were Captain E.J. McGoldrick, F/O Brian B. McKay, and Jimmy Sutherland, a wartime Lancaster flight engineer.

Fauquier died on Friday 3 April 1981.

Military offices
Preceded by Arthur Ross	Air Officer Commanding No. 62 Base (RAF); June–September 1944	Succeeded by J L Hurley
Preceded by James Tait	Officer Commanding No. 617 Squadron (RAF); December 1944 – April 1945	Succeeded by John Grindon
