= Paul Albert Hartman =

American aviator

Paul Albert Hartman (born November 25, 1918, in Grafton, Massachusetts; died January 30, 1990) was an American aviator who joined the Royal Canadian Air Force to fight in World War II. His notable contributions to aviation history include his career in the RCAF, where he earned the DFC, AFC, and CD. In 1942, he was posted to the RAF 69th squadron in Malta. He also piloted the Silver Dart II, and served as a test pilot for CF-100 and F-86E acceptance trials.

Hartman was inducted into the Canadian Aviation Hall of Fame in 1973.
