= Thomas F. Williams =

Thomas Frederic Williams
- Born: 12 October 1885; Ingersoll, Ontario, Canada
- Died: 25 July 1985 (aged 99); Woodstock, Ontario, Canada
- Military career
- Allegiance: George V
- Branch: Canadian Expeditionary Force; Royal Flying Corps; Royal Air Force
- Rank: Captain
- Nickname: "Voss"
- Units: 1st Canadian Division, No. 45 Squadron RFC, No. 28 Squadron RAF
- Awards: Military Cross, Italian Silver Medal of Military Valor
- Other work: Barnstormer, test pilot, poet

Captain Thomas Frederic Williams MC (12 October 1885 –25 July 1985) was a Canadian First World War flying ace, officially credited with 14 victories.

== Early life and service ==
Williams was the son of Fred. B. Williams and Lucy M. (nee Langford) Williams. When he enlisted in the 1st Canadian Division on 23 September, he was described as 5 feet 7½ inches tall, with red hair, blue eyes, and a ruddy complexion. He worked as a salesman, and stated he was already in the militia.

== Aerial service ==
After shipment to England, he switched to the Royal Flying Corps in 1916. He was forwarded to No. 45 Squadron RFC in France as a Sopwith Camel pilot after training. He was shot down by The Flying Circus on 22 September 1917. A month later, on 24 October, he destroyed an Albatros D.V for his first victory, fighting such an impassioned solo battle he gained the nickname "Voss" after the gallant German ace.

On 6 November 1917, he was shot down again, this time by "friendly" fire from a Canadian ground machine gunner. Two days later, he set a D.V aflame and drove down another out of control. On 13 November, he destroyed a Junkers J.I. As he was poised tantalizingly on the brink of acedom, his squadron used the inclement flying weather of winter to shift to Italy to oppose the Austro-Hungarians. Once there, Williams became an ace on 10 January 1918, and followed up with two more wins in January. He would score once more while in 45 Squadron, on 27 March 1918.

Williams transferred to 28 Squadron as a Flight Commander, and resumed his winning ways on 19 June, when he used a Camel to down yet another D.V. In just over five weeks, he ran up five more wins, ending up on 27 July 1918. In 199 war patrols, he had destroyed eight enemy airplanes, driven down four out of control, and captured another after killing its pilot.

== Postwar ==
Williams returned home to Canada and went barnstorming in the 1920s; he held Flying Certificate No. 91. Williams helped found the Royal Canadian Air Force. As World War II loomed, he joined Fleet Aircraft Company of Ontario in 1939 as chief test pilot, and remained there until 1948.

He was elected to the Canadian Aviation Hall of Fame. He also was active in Canadian World War I veterans reunions. He still flew; he was flying aerobatics in 1971, aged 86. In his 97th year, he became an author, publishing a volume of poetry. He died at the age of 99 years, 286 days.

== Text of citations ==
=== Military Cross ===
T./2nd Lt. Thomas Frederic Williams, Gen. List and R.F.C.

For conspicuous gallantry and devotion to duty. He destroyed four enemy aircraft and drove down one. Also, in conjunction with another officer, he was instrumental in forcing an enemy machine to surrender and land.
