= Wilson George Leach =

26th Surgeon General of Canada

Major-General W.G. Leach CMM, CD, QHP (28 September 1923 – 12 February 2015) was the 26th Canadian Surgeon General.

Born in Chalk River, Ontario, Leach left high school in 1940, to work as a car-checker for the Canadian Pacific Railway Company. In 1942, he enlisted in the RCAF, "and was trained as a pilot." The following year he received his "wings and a commission as a Pilot Officer." In 1945, he married Mabel Kathleen Pudney, and was posted as "a flight instructor at various RCAF flying training stations", under the British Commonwealth Air Training Program.

After the war, Leach went back to high school, and in 1946, enrolled at the University of Western Ontario, rejoined the RCAF and obtained his medical degree in 1952. The following year, he completed post-graduate studies in biophysics, also at the University of Western Ontario.

From 1954 to 1966, Leach "was posted to the RCAF Institute of Aviation Medicine at Toronto, Ontario where he worked" in several departments, including the respiratory physiology section. In 1961, he "was promoted to Wing Commander...and appointed Officer Commanding the Flying Personnel Medical Establishment."

Leach was next posted in 1966, to the staff of the surgeon general, as a Group Captain and Director of Medical Staffing and Training. In 1969, he attended the National Defence College course in Kingston, Ontario.

In 1970, "he was promoted to the rank of Brigadier-General...and appointed Deputy Surgeon General (Operations)."

Leach was next promoted to major-general in 1976, and appointed surgeon general. He remained in that position until 1980 when he retired from the Canadian Forces.

Major-General Leach was awarded several honours such as the Trans-Canada McKee Trophy (in 1960), which he received for his research in high-altitude physiology, and he was inducted into Canada's Aviation Hall of Fame (in 1974).

After retiring, Leach "became Associate Registrar of the Medical Council of Canada and then Registrar until retirement in 1987."

Major-General Leach died 12 February 2015 at the age of 92.
