= Alfred Beebe Caywood =

Canadian aviator

- Born: January 22, 1910; Oelrichs, South Dakota, U.S.
- Died: May 23, 1991 (aged 81); Victoria, British Columbia, Canada

Alfred Beebe Caywood (January 22, 1910 – May 23, 1991) was a Canadian aviator.

== Biography ==
Born January 22, 1910, in Oelrichs, South Dakota, Caywood relocated with his family to Edmonton, Alberta, in 1911. In 1925, he graduated from the McTavish Business College, subsequently becoming comptroller of a mine in the Coal Branch in New Brunswick and later working with the Alberta Land Titles and Provincial Income Tax. in 1933, he became a prospector in British Columbia, northern Saskatchewan and the Northwest Territories. He decided to take up flying in support of this career, but after receiving pilot's certification in 1937 took a job as a pilot with Canadian Airways. When Canadian Pacific Airlines was formed, he became one of their leading pilots in the Yukon, Alaska and the Northwest Territories, surviving a 1942 crash that killed one person.

In 1944, Caywood became involved with air services for Eldorado Mining and Refining, resupplying the uranium mine on Great Bear Lake as part of the Manhattan Project. He acquired a Douglas DC-3 for Eldorado, the first to be licensed commercially, using it to haul freight and passengers. During this time of his career, he set a number of records in aviation. In 1958, Eldorado formed subsidiary Eldorado Aviation, bringing on Caywood as President and General Manager, a position he maintained until his retirement in 1965. During his retirement, Caywood was an aviation consultant for the World Bank. He died on May 23, 1991.

== Honours and legacy ==
- Canada's Aviation Hall of Fame (1988)

== Bibliography ==
- Oswald, Mary, They Led the Way, Wetaskiwin: Canada's Aviation Hall of Fame, 1999. ISBN 0-9684843-0-1
