= Jerauld George Wright =

Canadian air navigation experts and inventor (1917–2016)

Wing Commander Jerauld George Wright (31 August 1917 – 13 September 2016) was a Royal Canadian Air Force (RCAF) navigator and prolific inventor of air navigation systems. He is best known for the Position and Heading Indicator (PHI), R-Theta Computer and ANTAC, mechanical computer systems that automatically calculated the positions of key locations with little or no operator input. Many of his inventions were produced for Canadian aircraft by Computing Devices Canada, who got their start in 1949 building the PHI. His inventions were also widely licensed and used in various forms by allied nations. He held a total of thirty patents licensed by the Canadian government.

== Early life ==
Wright was born in Liverpool, Nova Scotia, on 31 August 1917 to Edgar and Jessie (West) Wright. He went to school in town, and after high school he received a diploma as a certified pharmaceutical clerk. He worked in town until 1940 when he joined the Royal Canadian Air Force (RCAF).

== Wartime experience ==
Trained as an air navigator he was assigned to No. 240 Squadron RAF on the Supermarine Stranraer flying out of Lough Erne, Ireland. No. 240 converted to the Consolidated Catalina shortly after he arrived and he spent the rest of the war on these aircraft. During early operations his right hand was hit by the propeller of one Catalina, severing the tips of his fingers. From then on he prepared his navigational logs using a portable typewriter. He married a Scottish physiotherapist who helped him learn to use his hands again.

He was promoted to Pilot Officer in early 1942 and began a series of extreme long-distance flights to Spitzbergen as a stop on an air route along the coast of Norway and Russia to Arkhangelsk in the USSR. The long-distance flights in the arctic demonstrated problems with the navigational instruments on the aircraft, and Wright began modifying the systems for better performance. One such flight lasted almost 25 hours, earning Wright the Distinguished Flying Cross (DFC):

As captain of aircraft and navigator respectively, Flight Lieutenant Hawkins and Pilot Officer Wright recently carried out an extremely important mission. The flight, which was one of twenty-four and three-quarter hours' duration, necessitated flying more than 2,000 miles across the sea. That completion was achieved despite adverse weather and intense cold can be attributed to the skilful piloting of Flight Lieutenant Hawkins, combined with the brilliant navigation of Pilot Officer Wright. Throughout, both these officers showed great powers of endurance and their outstanding performance is worthy of the highest praise.

—

No. 240 moved to India in March 1942 and the long-distance flights continued over the Indian Ocean, before moving again to Burma. During these missions, Wright developed new celestial navigation techniques to provide precise timing and navigation to the small bays along the coastline where the flying boats were stationed. For this work he was Mentioned in Despatches. He eventually spent 1,200 hours on flights during two tours of duty.

== Return to Canada ==
In 1945 he returned to the UK to attend the Empire Air Navigation School where he worked on testing and development of new air navigation systems and techniques. During this period he also completed the advanced specialist navigational course.

On his return to Canada in 1946, he was posted to what became the RCAF's Central Experimental and Proving Establishment (CEPE) at CFB Rockcliffe in Ottawa. There he worked on compass systems and began development of what would emerge as the Synchronous Astro Compass (SAC). In 1947, he was promoted to the head of the Test and Development Section. In 1947 he moved to CFB Summerside on Prince Edward Island where he completed development of the SAC.

In 1949 he was promoted to Squadron Leader and returned to Ottawa to take a staff position at RCAF Headquarters to run the Navigational Instrument Development Branch of the Air Member for Technical Services Division. It was during his time here that his best known inventions were produced. The first of these was the Position and Homing Indicator (PHI), a simple inertial navigation system that was set at the start of the mission and maintained a measure of the compass heading and distance to the point of origin so the pilot could easily return to base without the aid of a navigator or external aids. In 1949, Computing Devices Canada formed to build the PHI and it became a common instrument on Canadian aircraft.

A more complex variation of the same basic concept followed, the R-Theta Computer (R for range, Theta for angle). In addition to providing a home bearing like PHI, the R-Theta also estimated the distance and direction to selected locations on the ground, producing a list of waypoints. This provided both navigation to a point of interest as well as a "get home" function. The R-Theta was a significant advance in navigation systems; although similar systems were emerging in the UK and US, the R-Theta was small enough to fit in fighter aircraft and required only a single standard instrument slot on the control panel. This was used in the Avro Canada CF-100 Canuck and many other aircraft. For this work, he won the Trans-Canada Trophy in 1953.

In June 1951, Wright was assigned as the commanding officer of the No. 1 Training Air Group of the Royal Canadian Naval Air Branch, a position he held until August 1953.

Wright was promoted to wing commander in 1954. He was sent to a course on missile guidance that year. In 1957/58 he attended the RCAF Staff College in Toronto, and then the senior anti-submarine detection course at the Joint Services Staff College in the UK in 1961. On his return to Canada he was posted to the Naval Research Establishment, Dartmouth where he worked on underwater detection devices, hydrofoil feasibility and sonar research.

Wright returned to RCAF Headquarters in the Directorate of Instruments and Electrical Engineering. During this period he developed the Air Navigation and Tactical Control (ANTAC), a system that combined the features of the R-Theta with links to Doppler radar, TACAN and automatic direction finders, which gave it much higher accuracy and almost completely automated operations. At the time it was considered to be the most advanced tactical navigation system capability in the world, forming the basis of the Canadair CP-107 Argus's attack and navigation systems, and saw use in France, Australia and Japan.

In total, Wright held 30 navigation related patents.

== After RCAF ==
Retiring in 1966, Wright formed JGW Systems as a consulting firm. He was inducted into the Canadian Aviation Hall of Fame in 1974. He died in Ottawa in 2016.
