= Ronald John Baker =

Canadian engineer

- Born: March 28, 1912; Yellowgrass, Saskatchewan, Canada
- Died: March 24, 1990 (aged 77); Pointe-Claire, Quebec, Canada

Ronald John Baker (March 28, 1912 – March 24, 1990) was a pioneering Canadian engineer.
