= Zebulon Lewis Leigh =

Canadian aviator

- Born: 19 June 1906; Macclesfield, England
- Died: 22 December 1996 (aged 90)
- Occupation: Aviator
- Organization: Royal Canadian Air Force
- Spouse: Lin Leigh

Zebulon Lewis "Lewie" Leigh, CM OBE (19 June 1906 – 22 December 1996) was a Canadian aviator. He never used his first name and was always addressed as "Lewie".

== Aviation career ==
Leigh was the first pilot to work for Trans Canada Airlines in 1937.

== Second World War service ==
Lewie joined the Royal Canadian Air Force in 1940. His first assignment was anti-submarine flying, but was transferred to Transport Command in 1942. It is there that he is chiefly remembered for his excellent administrative abilities, almost overnight revolutionizing how Transport Command ran, more like a professional airline than the previous hodge podge of assignments. Leigh frequently got out from behind the desk to oversee the work being done. One of his great talents was finding good people; and he frequently praised them in his memoirs. As an example, he secured the awarding of the Order of the British Empire for Leslie Collins, one of his squadron leaders.

Leigh continued in RCAF service until 1957.

== Later activities ==
Leigh would write his memoirs after his service titled And I Shall Fly. He also wrote a biography of his wife titled My lady of courage : the story of Lillian Jane "Lin" Leigh.

Leigh was one of the founders of the Canada's Aviation Hall of Fame and was inducted in 1974.

== Photography ==
Leigh also was an extensive chronicler of his work and travels. The Canadian national archives possesses 644 of Leigh's photographs ranging from 1919 to 1986.

== Awards and honours ==
- Order of the British Empire 1944
- Trans Canada McKee Trophy 1946
- Order of Canada, CM
- Canada's Aviation Hall of Fame, 1974
- Yukon Territory Order of Polaris

Lewie is featured on the commemorative twenty dollar Canadian coin issued in the "History of Aviation" series in 1993. He is pictured as a cameo along with a Lockheed Electra.

Leigh Crescent, a street in the City of Edmonton, is named for him.
