= Helen Harrison-Bristol =

Canadian aviator (1909–1995)

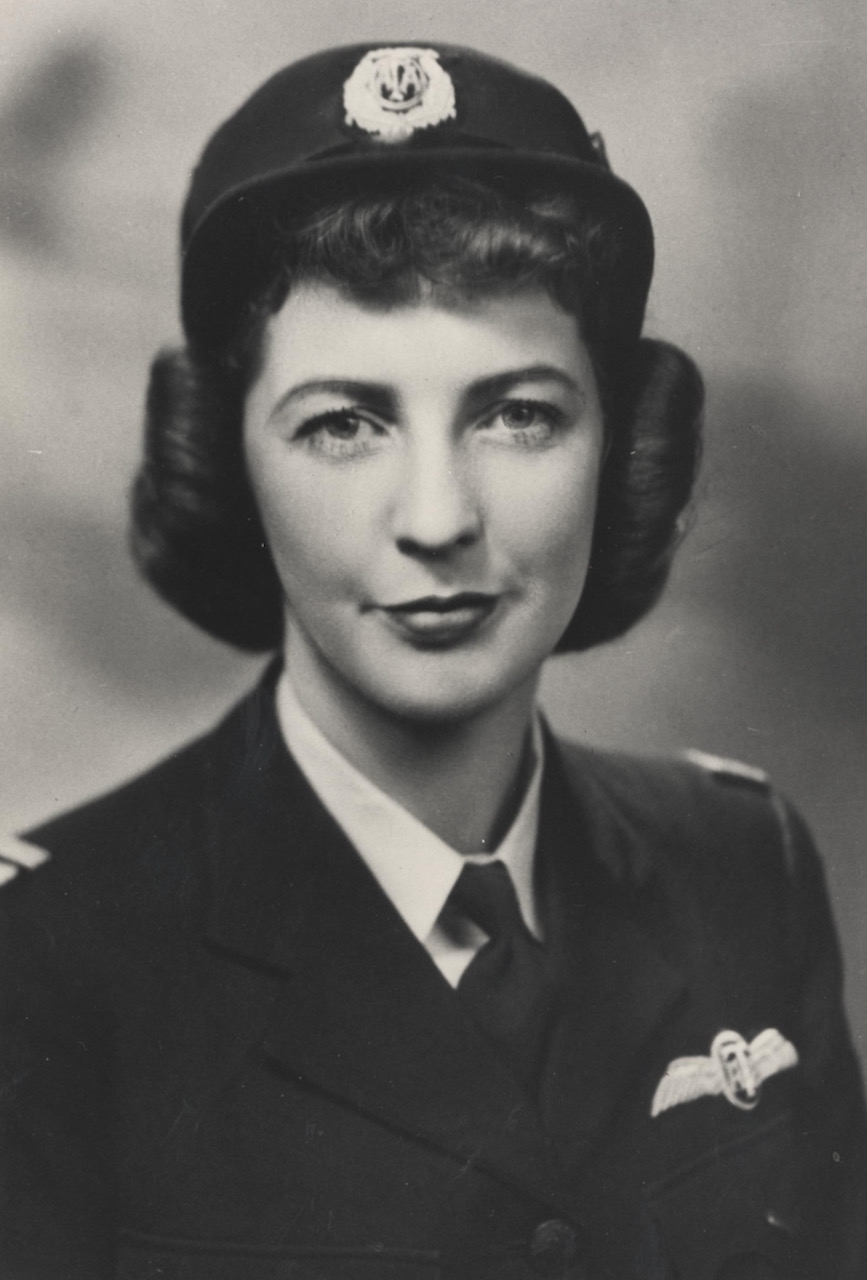
- Helen M Harrison, Air Transport Auxiliary, Britain, 1942
- Born: Helen Marcelle Harrison-Bristol; December 7, 1909; Vancouver, Canada
- Died: April 27, 1995 (aged 85); Blaine, Washington, U.S.
- Occupation: Pilot

Helen Marcelle Harrison Bristol (December 7, 1909 – April 27, 1995) was a pioneering Canadian female civil aviation instructor and the first Canadian Air Transport Auxiliary ferry pilot during World War II.

== Early years ==
She was born in Vancouver, British Columbia on December 7, 1909, and educated in England and Belgium. Whilst still a child she was sent to St Mary's School in Calne, Wiltshire, England. During her residence in Eastbourne, she went on her first flight and decided to become a pilot. She secretly took flying lessons until she received her A licence in 1935. While visiting Singapore, she qualified for her seaplane rating. She obtained her B licence at the London Aeroplane Club in April 1936 and in October qualified for her instructor's rating. Soon afterwards, she moved to South Africa and settled in Somerset West.

She acquired additional instruction at Johannesburg, South Africa, before returning to England in 1935 to qualify for a commercial pilot's license. Her total commitment to aviation was made in 1936 when she became one of the first women pilots to receive an instructor's rating in England, and promptly returned to South Africa.

As the first woman to hold a commercial pilot and instructor's rating in that country, she taught at the Cape Town Flying Club and demonstrated such ability that the Royal South African Air Force (RSAAF) offered her an instructor's course on military aircraft at Pretoria. Her outstanding abilities were then retained by the RSAAF to train reserve air force pilots. During this period she also qualified for the South African commercial pilot's certificate as well as instructor and instrument ratings. Until 1938 when she returned to England, her skills were employed by Central Airways at Johannesburg and Port Elizabeth.

In 1939, she was appointed chief flying instructor at the Sheffield Aero Club, then journeyed to the United States to earn that country's commercial pilot's certificate. Still upgrading her qualifications, she travelled to Hamilton, Ontario and earned her Canadian commercial pilot's license and class two instructor's rating. Cub Aircraft Company at Hamilton hired her as an instructor, and within a year she was named test pilot and chief flying instructor.

Helen had a number of surnames. According to her divorce record in South Africa, her maiden name was Testemale. This was a divorce from Louis Botha de Waal in 1939. Various sources give her maiden name as Harrison. In April 1935, according to a legal notice published in The Times, London, she was living at 33 Heathurst Road, Sanderstead, Surrey, when she renounced the surname Barnes and stated that she was to be known as Helen Marcelle Harrison. Canada's Aviation Hall of Fame lists her as Helen Marcelle Harrison Bristol.

== Second World War ==
Until 1942, her experience was directed towards pilot training at Toronto, London and Kitchener, Ontario when she was accepted as the first Canadian woman ferry pilot to serve in the United Kingdom with the Air Transport Auxiliary (ATA). Harrison served in the ATA as a Pilot First Officer from 1 May 1942 until 22 March 1944. In 1943 she co-piloted a Mitchell bomber across the North Atlantic Ocean from Montreal, Quebec to Scotland, and until 1944 she delivered military aircraft within the United Kingdom.

== Post-Second World War ==
As demonstration pilot for Percival Aircraft Company she flew a single-engined airplane across Canada in 1946. During the next 33 years she held chief flying instructor positions with a number of British Columbia flying services. In 1961, she earned a United States instructor's certificate and until her retirement in 1969, after 34 years as a pilot, she taught floatplane flying in Canada. In 1968, she was awarded the B.C. Aviation Council's Air Safety Trophy, after logging 14,000 hours as pilot-in-command of numerous aircraft types, without injury to passenger or crew.

== Personal life ==
After 34 years working as a pilot Helen Harrison retired in 1969. She married Donald M. Bristol.

== Honours and legacy ==
- Canada's Aviation Hall of Fame (1974)
- A street is named in her honor near Mirabel Airport (Quebec).
