= George Bayliss Lothian =

Canadian aviator (1900–2000)

- Born: 20 November 1909; Vancouver, British Columbia, Canada
- Died: 13 February 2000; White Rock, British Columbia, Canada
- Occupations: Airline captain, author
- Employer: Trans-Canada Air Lines / Air Canada
- Known for: Fourth pilot hired by Trans-Canada Air Lines; author of Flight Deck (1980); Holder of the transatlantic crossing speed record three times
- Spouse: Rose Vivian Crispin (m. 1940)
- Children: 3

Captain George Bayliss Lothian (20 November 1909 – 13 February 2000) was a Canadian aviator and one of the earliest pilots hired by Trans-Canada Air Lines (TCA), later Air Canada. He helped pioneer commercial aviation in Canada, flying domestic and trans-Atlantic routes from the 1930s through the 1970s, and authored Flight Deck (1980), one of the first comprehensive accounts of Air Canada's history.

== Early life ==
George Bayliss Lothian was born in Vancouver, British Columbia, in 1900 to Edward Lothian and Helen May (Fremlin) Lothian. He was educated in Vancouver schools and began his flying career in 1929. Before joining TCA, he worked as an airport instructor with Canadian Airways.

== Aviation career ==
He was among the first four pilots hired by Trans-Canada Air Lines on 9 September 1937. During the war he ferried four-engined aircraft across the North Atlantic and by 1945 had completed more than one hundred ocean crossings. In 1944 he set an eastbound Montreal–Britain time mark of 10 hours 13 minutes in a converted Lancaster transport. Post-war he served as a senior captain on the Montreal–Prestwick route and later in operations leadership; a 1949 Globe and Mail feature profiled him as a veteran of 240 Atlantic flights.

He was the first Canadian pilot to log one hundred aircraft crossings of the North Atlantic and set the transatlantic crossing speed record three times. When he retired from Air Canada in 1968, he had logged over 21,000 hours as pilot-in-command of a wide range of piston and jet transport aircraft.

According to the Canadian Museum of Flight, Lothian once reluctantly provided flight instruction in the Vickers Viscount turboprop airliner to Howard Hughes, later recalling that he did not appreciate either the aviator's personal hygiene or his attitude.

In 1960, Lothian appeared in a British Pathé newsreel documenting the delivery of the first Vickers Vanguard aircraft to Trans-Canada Air Lines at Wisley Airfield, Surrey. The footage shows Captain Lothian, TCA Superintendent of Flying, with Vickers-Armstrongs test pilot Captain R. Rymer inspecting the aircraft before its delivery flight.

Lothian was awarded the Yukon Territory Order of Polaris and was inducted into the Canadian Aviation Hall of Fame in 1973.

== Personal life ==
Lothian married Rose Vivian Crispin on 10 October 1940 in New Westminster, British Columbia. Rose was one of Canada's early airline stewardesses. They had three children, Marilyn "Pixie" Blakeburn, Heather Chetwynd, and Bruce Lothian.

He was known for his meticulous approach to flight discipline and his mentorship of younger pilots. His Canada's Aviation Hall of Fame inscription reads: "His inspired leadership in ocean flying despite adversity, the sharing of his exceptional aviation skills with others willing to learn, his unswerving demand for perfection in all who served under his command, bred a most superior grade of airman."

== Later life and death ==
Lothian retired to White Rock, British Columbia after more than 40 years in aviation. He died at Peace Arch Hospital on 13 February 2000. A service was held on 17 February 2000 at Chapel Hill Funeral Home in White Rock, followed by cremation.

== Legacy ==
Lothian's career appears in numerous Canadian newspapers, company bulletins, and Air Canada publications. His book Flight Deck (1980) remains a primary source for early TCA and Air Canada history.
