= Cawood, Kentucky =

Census-designated place in Kentucky, United States

- Census-designated place
- Location within Kentucky Location within the United States
- Coordinates: 36°47′2″N 83°13′42″W
- Country: United States
- State: Kentucky
- County: Harlan

Area
  - Total: 1.46 sq mi (3.78 km^{2})
  - Land: 1.46 sq mi (3.78 km^{2})
  - Water: 0 sq mi (0.00 km^{2})
- Elevation: 1,320 ft (400 m)

Population (2020)
  - Total: 630
  - Density: 432.0/sq mi (166.79/km^{2})
- Time zone: UTC-6 (Central (CST))
  - Summer (DST): UTC-5 (EDT)
- ZIP code: 40815
- FIPS code: 21-13582
- GNIS feature ID: 489151

Cawood is a census-designated place (CDP) and coal town in Harlan County, Kentucky, United States. As of the 2020 census, Cawood had a population of 630.

A post office in Cawood was established in 1890 by Wilson S. Hensley. He said one of his ancestors was Berry Cawood, a hero of the Revolutionary War.

== Geography ==
Cawood is located in south-central Harlan County in the valley of Crummies Creek, where it joins Martins Fork of the Cumberland River. U.S. Route 421 now borders the southern edge of the community, leading northwest down the Martins Fork valley 9 miles (14 km) to Harlan, the county seat, and southeast across the Tennessee Valley Divide 14 miles (23 km) to Pennington Gap, Virginia.

According to the U.S. Census Bureau, the Cawood CDP has an area of 1.5 square miles (3.8 km^{2}), all of it land.

== Demographics ==
Historical population
Census	Pop.	Note	%±
2020	630		—
U.S. Decennial Census

As of the 2010 census there were 731 people, 292 households, and 210 families residing in the CDP. The population density was 39 people per square mile (15 people/km^{2}).
