= Buck McNair =

Canadian WW2 flying ace (1919–1971)

Robert Wendell McNair
- Born: 15 May 1919; Springfield, Nova Scotia, Canada
- Died: 15 January 1971 (aged 51); London, England
- Military career
- Allegiance: Canada
- Branch: Royal Canadian Air Force
- Service years: 1940–1971
- Rank: Group Captain
- Nickname: Buck
- Commands: 126 Wing; No. 421 Squadron RCAF; No. 416 Squadron RCAF
- Conflicts: Second World War: European Theatre; Siege of Malta; Dieppe Raid; Korean War
- Awards: Distinguished Service Order; Distinguished Flying Cross & Two Bars; Queen's Commendation for Brave Conduct; Legion of Honour (France); Croix de Guerre (France)

Group Captain Robert Wendell "Buck" McNair, DSO, DFC & Two Bars (15 May 1919 – 15 January 1971) was a Royal Canadian Air Force (RCAF) flying ace of the Second World War, with 16 or 16.5 victories and five probables.

== Early life ==
NcNair was born on 15 May 1919 in Springfield, Nova Scotia, the son of railroad engineer Kenneth Frank McNair (1891–1973) and Hilda May (née Grimm; 1898–1983). The family moved to North Battleford, Saskatchewan, during the Great Depression. McNair graduated from high school in North Battleford in 1937 and went to work as a ground wireless (radio) operator for the Saskatchewan Ministry of Natural Resources.

== Second World War ==
Following the outbreak of the Second World War in 1939, McNair enlisted in the Royal Canadian Air Force in June 1940 and attended training schools No. 1 ITS in Toronto, No. 7 EFTS in Windsor and No. 31 SFTS in Kingston. He graduated as a pilot on 24 March 1941 and was posted to No. 411 Squadron RCAF at RAF Digby in Lincolnshire, England, in June 1941.

McNair's first encounter with the enemy came on 27 September 1941, while escorting Bristol Blenheim bombers in a Spitfire on a raid against the railroad yards in Amiens and a power plant near Mazingarble. He managed to get behind and damage a Messerschmitt Bf 109, but was attacked by another 109 before he could finish the job and had to break off. His first victory came on 13 October over Boulogne; he downed one 109 and damaged another, though he himself was shot down and had to parachute into the English Channel.

With Malta undergoing heavy Axis aerial attacks and in danger of invasion, the Allies sent reinforcements numerous times between 1940 and 1942. On 2 March 1942, McNair piloted one of 17 Spitfires launched from the British aircraft carrier HMS Eagle to the beleaguered island. As a member of No. 249 Squadron RAF, he was frequently engaged in combat in the skies above Malta. He shot down a 109 on 19 March, a Junkers Ju 88 on 26 March, a 109 on 20 April and a Ju 88 on 22 April, making him an ace. He increased his tally by three 109s, on 22 May, 25 May, and 10 June, before being recalled to England for a leave. He was promoted first to flying officer, then to flight lieutenant sometime during this period.

Rejoining No. 411 Squadron, McNair participated in the disastrous Dieppe Raid. On 19 August, he was credited with a probable kill of a Focke-Wulf Fw 190 and with damaging another. He was then sent home to Canada for six months rest and war bond drives.

Declining command of a training school, McNair was assigned briefly to lead No. 416 Squadron RCAF, before being given command of No. 421 Squadron RCAF. On 28 July 1943, his Spitfire had engine trouble off knocke and burst into flames on the way home from a mission. He managed to parachute into the water and was saved by Walrus burned about the face. Admitted into hospital for treatment. His eyesight was permanently damaged, so he had to get closer to the enemy than before to compensate. He kept his handicap to himself, leading others to believe that he was being excessively reckless. Nonetheless, that year he brought down four Fw 190s (20 June 24 June 6 September and 3 October) and an equal number of Bf 109s (6 July 10 July 31 August and 3 September), bringing his final tally to 16 or 16.5 confirmed kills.

In 1944, McNair was promoted to wing commander of 126 Wing, RAF Second Tactical Air Force at RAF Biggin Hill, which meant he no longer flew combat missions. After six months, he was reassigned from operational to administrative duties.

== Post-war ==
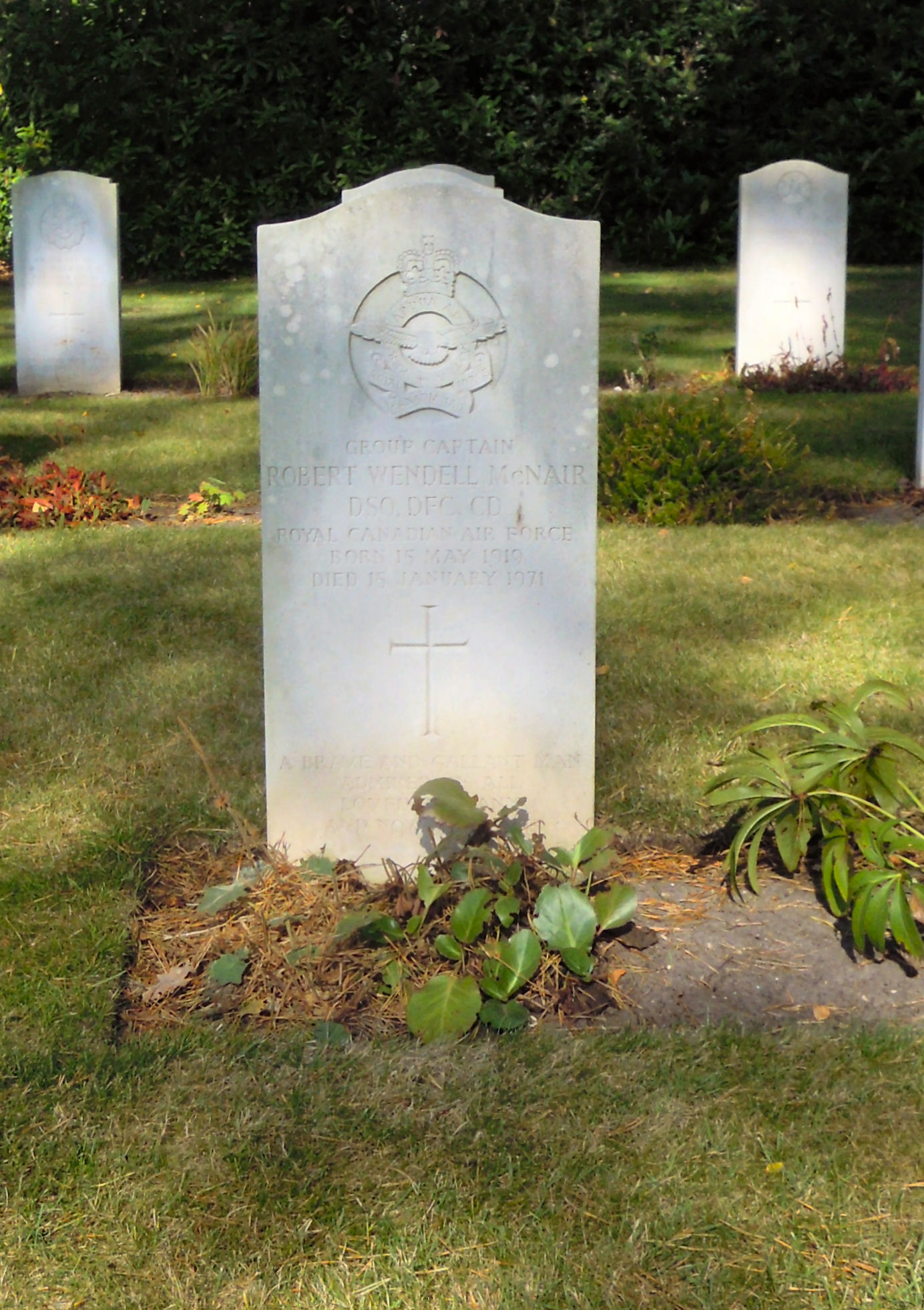
McNair's grave in the Canadian Section of Brookwood Military Cemetery

McNair remained in the RCAF after the war. Upon graduating from the Empire Flying Training School, he was posted to RAF Fakenham, Norfolk, to fly Gloster Meteor and de Havilland Vampire jet fighters. He later served as Air Advisor and Attaché of the Military Mission at the Canadian Embassy in Tokyo, Japan.

For his contributions in the Korean War "as Royal Canadian Air Force Liaison Officer to the Far East Air Forces from 27 June 1951 to 27 July 1953," the United States government offered to award McNair a Bronze Star Medal, but it was against RCAF policy.

McNair was aboard a Canadair North Star which crashed at Vancouver, British Columbia, Canada, on 30 December 1953. He made sure that all passengers and crew were safely evacuated before leaving himself, despite being soaked in gasoline. For this, he was awarded the Queen's Commendation for Brave Conduct. He suffered spinal injuries and was treated for a year.

McNair was promoted to group captain in 1956 and posted to No. 4 Fighter Wing in CFB Baden-Soellingen. In 1964, he was made Deputy-Commander of NORAD's Duluth sector. He later joined the Canadian Joint Staff office at the High Commission in London.

McNair died of leukemia and was buried in Brookwood Cemetery, Surrey, England.

== Family life ==
McNair met Watford-born stenographer Barbara Gwendoline Still (1925–2006) on a blind date in London in 1942; they married in 1944 and had two sons: Bruce and Lawrence Keith NcNair (1949–1998). On her death, she was buried beside her husband in Brookwood Cemetery.

== Honours ==
McNair was awarded the Distinguished Flying Cross on 22 May 1942, 27 July 1943 and 22 October 1943.

In April 1944, Acting Wing Commander McNair was awarded the Distinguished Service Order.

The French government awarded him the Croix de Guerre with Palm and made him a Chevalier of the Legion of Honour, both in September 1947.

As noted in the previous section, he received the Queen's Commendation for Brave Conduct in August 1954.

In 1990, he was inducted into Canada's Aviation Hall of Fame.

=== Citations ===
==== Distinguished Flying Cross ====
Pilot Officer Robert Wendell MCNAIR (Can/J.4745), Royal Canadian Air Force, No. 249 Squadron.

This officer is a skilful and courageous pilot. He invariably presses home his attacks with the greatest determination irrespective of the odds. He has destroyed at least 5 and damaged 7 enemy aircraft; 4 of these he damaged in 1 combat.

==== Bar to Distinguished Flying Cross ====
Acting Squadron Leader Robert Wendell MCNAIR (Can/J.4745), Royal Canadian Air Force, No. 421 (R.C.A.F) Squadron.

This officer is a skilful and determined fighter, whose record of achievement and personal example are worthy of high praise. Squadron Leader McNair has destroyed 10 hostile aircraft (5 of them whilst serving in the Middle East) and damaged a number of others.

==== Second bar to Distinguished Flying Cross ====
Squadron Leader Robert Wendell MCNAIR (Can/J.4745), Royal Canadian Air Force, No. 421 (R.C.A.F) Squadron.

Squadron Leader McNair is a tenacious and confident fighter, whose outstanding ability has proved an inspiration to the squadron he commands. He has completed a large number of sorties and has destroyed 15 and damaged many other enemy aircraft. His keenness has been outstanding.
