= Canadian Aeronautics and Space Institute =

Canadian Aeronautics and Space Institute is a nonprofit organization for Canadians that are interested in the fields of space, aeronautics, and remote sensing. It seeks to further the cause of science and engineering among the population, and provides for networking opportunities within the aeronautics and space community in Canada. The institute is composed of 15 branches that serve around 1600 members in major cities across the nation, with some being partially or fully sponsored by Canadian universities and colleges.

== History ==
The Canadians Aeronautics and Space Institute was formed in 1954 when the Montreal based Institute of Aircraft Technicians, the Ottawa Aeronautical Society, and the Canadian sections of the U.S. Institute of Aeronautical Sciences amalgamated to form the Canadian Aeronautical Institute (CAI).
