= John Alexander Austin =

Canadian aviator (1912–1984)

- Born: September 30, 1912; Renfrew, Ontario, Canada
- Died: December 1, 1984 (aged 72); Toronto, Ontario, Canada

John Alexander Austin (September 30, 1912 – December 1, 1984) was a pioneering Canadian aviator.
