= Quesnel Airport =

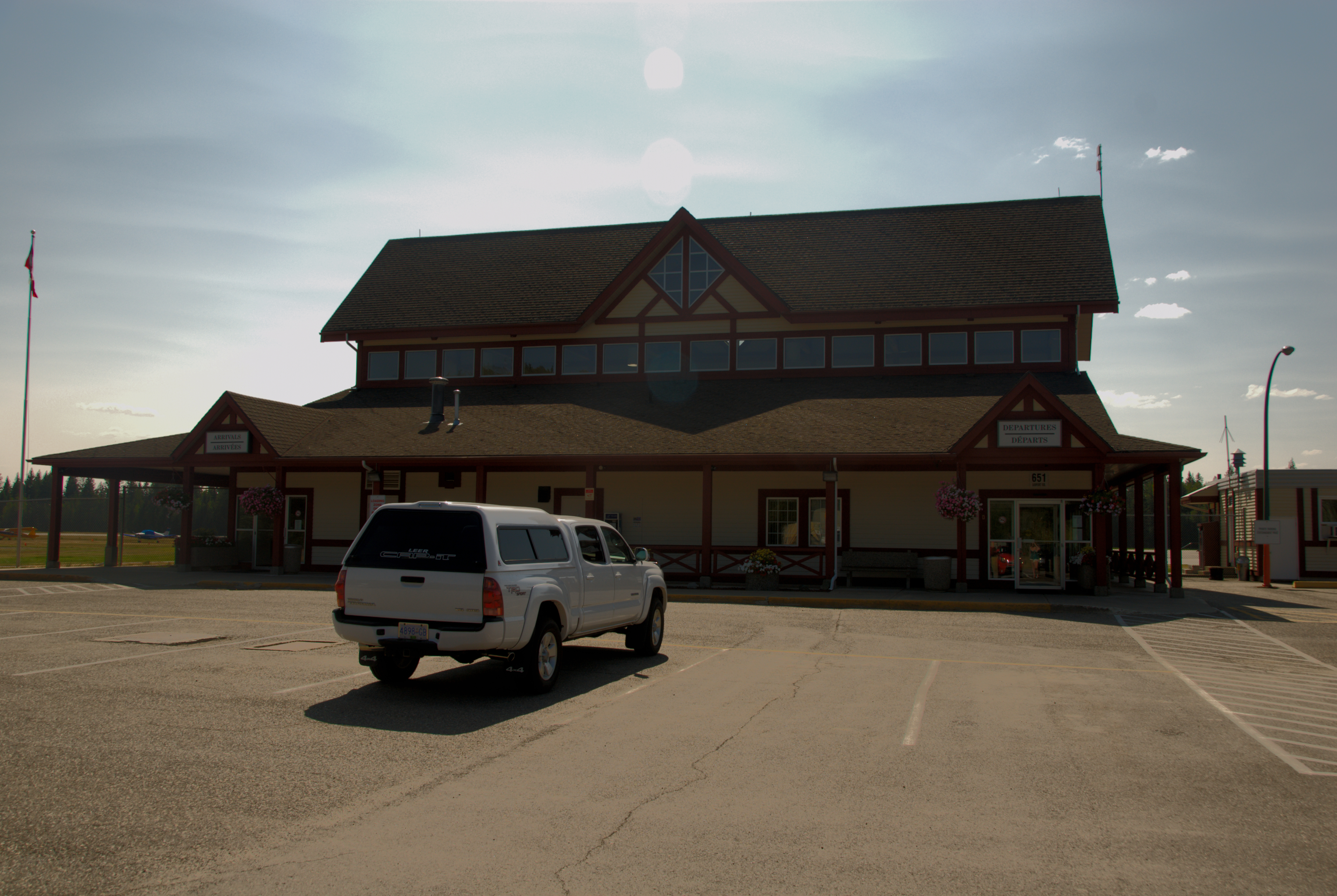
- Terminal building, Quesnel, 2010
- IATA: YQZ; ICAO: CYQZ; WMO: 71779

Summary
- Airport type: Public
- Owner: City of Quesnel
- Operator: City of Quesnel
- Location: Quesnel, British Columbia
- Time zone: MST (UTC−07:00)
- Elevation AMSL: 1,788 ft (545 m)
- Coordinates: 53°01′34″N 122°30′37″W
- Website: Official website

Map
- Location in British Columbia

Runways
Direction	Length		Surface
Direction	ft	m	Surface
13/31	5,501	1,677	Concrete / asphalt
- Sources: Canada Flight Supplement; Environment and Climate Change Canada

Quesnel Airport (IATA: YQZ, ICAO: CYQZ) is on the east side of the Fraser River about 2 nautical miles (3.7 km; 2.3 mi) north of central Quesnel, British Columbia, Canada.

== Earlier activity ==
In October 1928, John M. Patterson landed a Yukon Airways and Exploration Company Alexander Eaglerock, a 1920s biplane, at Johnston's Field. In September 1929, Walter Gilbert came in a Western Canada Airways (WCA) Boeing B-1E. That winter, a Fairchild 71 operated by Consolidated Mining and Smelting arrived on the frozen Fraser next to the bridge. During the summer of 1930, Wilhelm A. Joerss descended onto the Fraser in an Air Land Manufacturing Company Junkers F 13. In March 1931, Tom S. Corless made a weather-prompted landing of a Stinson SM-8A at Nam Sing's Field about 9.7 km (6 mi) north of Quesnel.

During the early 1930s, R.L. (Ginger) Coote was based at Quesnel, initially operating as a sole proprietorship. In October 1933, he incorporated Bridge River and Cariboo Airways. Wheel-equipped aircraft heading to Alaska preferred the inland route up the Fraser, making Quesnel a popular stop. By 1934, Baker's Field came into use. In January 1938, the inaugural Ashcroft–Fort St. John airmail run landed on the frozen Dragon Lake south of Quesnel. This lake became the preferred venue for floatplanes.

== World War II era ==
In 1942, during World War II, the Department of National Defence (DND) developed the present site as an intermediate facility between Williams Lake and Prince George. The airport was called Royal Canadian Air Force (RCAF) Station Quesnel. In May 1943, the airport was designated the No. 13 Staging Unit. In the event of a Japanese invasion, fighter aircraft could be operated from the airstrip as a second line of defence. The RCAF established a radio range aircraft navigational facility nearby.

== Department of Transport administration ==
In 1946, administration of the airport passed from the DND to the Department of Transport (DOT, now Transport Canada). In 1949, extensive drain and ditch work was carried out.

In 1950, a spacious new refuelling area was developed. In 1951, further drainage work and some paving were undertaken and approach lighting tendered for the 5,500 by 200 ft (1,676 by 61 m) runway. In 1954, the Quesnel Flying Club was founded, later disbanding, but reactivating in 1985. The reconstruction and paving of the runway, taxiway, and parking area culminated in an official opening in November 1958. Tendered that year was the installation of medium intensity lighting, and in 1959, the erection of a duplex.

In 1960, Canadian Pacific Air Lines (CP Air) began scheduled services using a DC-3. In 1963, the frequency was reduced from daily to tri-weekly. That year, a new main reservoir was added to the existing pumphouse. After years of inadequate accommodation, a new terminal was opened in 1967. The next year, the construction of a new powerhouse was tendered.

In 1971, Thunderbird Airlines, under charter to Pacific Western Airlines (PWA), inaugurated a Prince George−Kelowna service, which included a Quesnel stop. During a 1974 firefighter strike at Prince George Airport, CP Air and PWA Boeing 737s were landing at Quesnel. Less than a week later, these 737 flights switched to Williams Lake Airport, because the existence of only auxiliary ground crew firefighters and a 160 kg (350 lb) dry chemical carrying truck at Quesnel Airport was deemed inadequate.

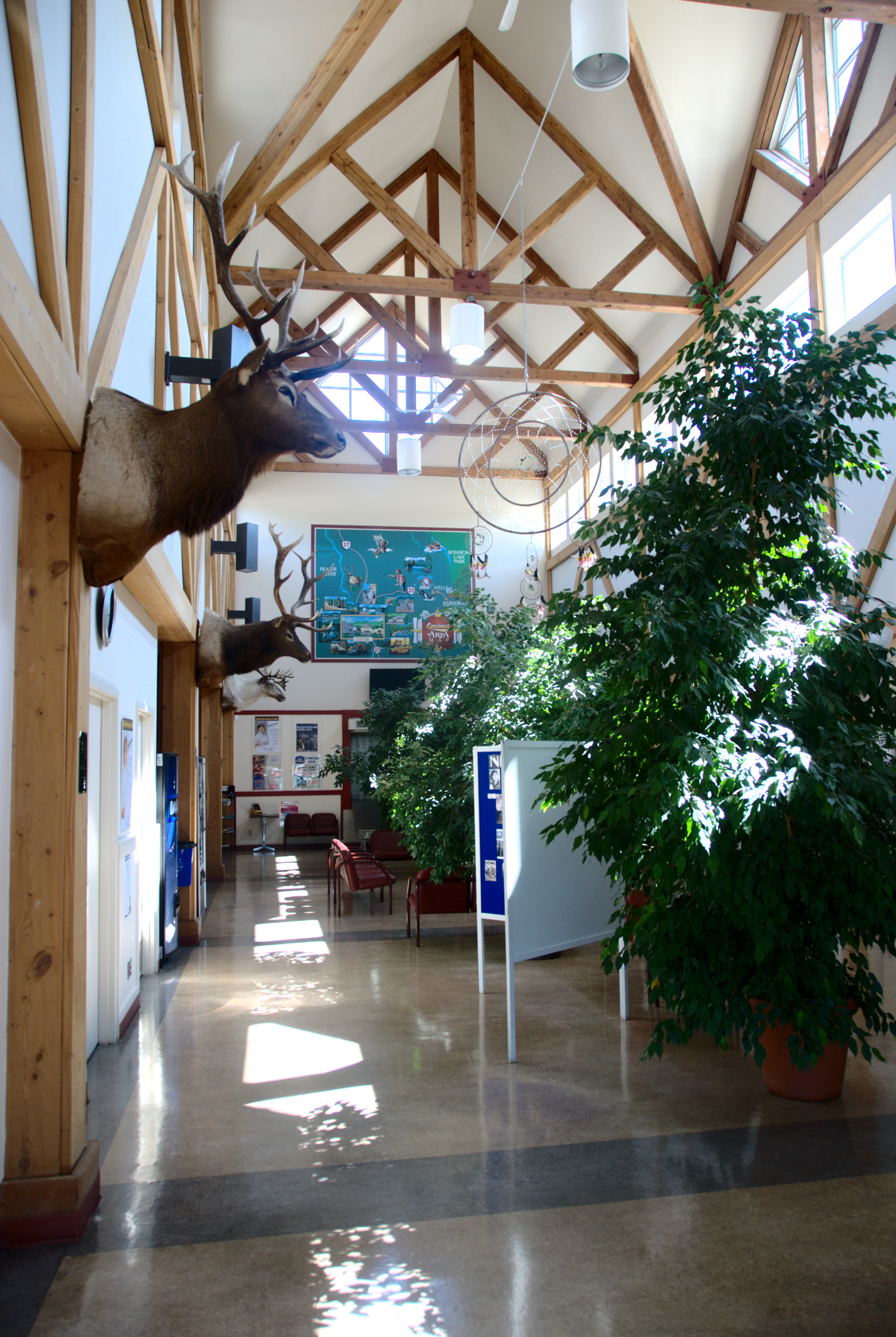
Interior airport terminal, Quesnel, 2010.

By 1978, the three trained part-time firefighters and a 450 kg (1,000 lb) dry chemical truck exceeded the fire suppression standards for a Class F airport. Quesnel then averaged 48 take-offs or landings by heavy (over 11,000 kg [25,000 lb]) aircraft per month. A foam fire truck had been transferred to Williams Lake the prior year, because of decreased air traffic at Quesnel.

In 1980, the overhead power distribution system was rebuilt. The next year, a new passenger arrival area was set up in a portable at the south end of the terminal. In 1983, the runway and a taxiway were repaved. The next year, a new fire hall / maintenance garage was erected and the water supply system upgraded.

In 1991, the runway was rehabilitated. Construction tendered in 1992 included a meteorological instrument compound and the associated underground electrical ducting. That year, the airport handled more than 18,000 passengers and 13,000 aircraft movements. In 1993, a new 504 m^{2} (5,430 sq ft) timber terminal and the associated road and parking lot were built. The former portable accommodation was tendered for disposal.

== City of Quesnel administration ==
In 1997, control and maintenance passed from Transport Canada to the City of Quesnel. At the time, the federal government provided $1.8 million for safety improvements, which included resurfacing the runway, taxiway and apron, and upgrading the airfield lighting. Regular federal subsidies of about $500,000 per year came to an end.

In 2003, a $211,000 federal grant funded an upgrade of the security gates and the purchase a runway sweeper. The next year, Central Mountain Air (CMA) replaced Air Canada Jazz as the sole scheduled service provider. In 2005, the name changed from the Quesnel Municipal Airport to the Quesnel Regional Airport. In 2010, the first annual SkyFest airshow was held, and the airport received a federal grant of about $158,000 to replace the old wet / dry chemical spreader. That year, the airport provided a temporary base for personnel and aircraft fighting wildfires in the area, which developed into an ongoing forestry services facility.

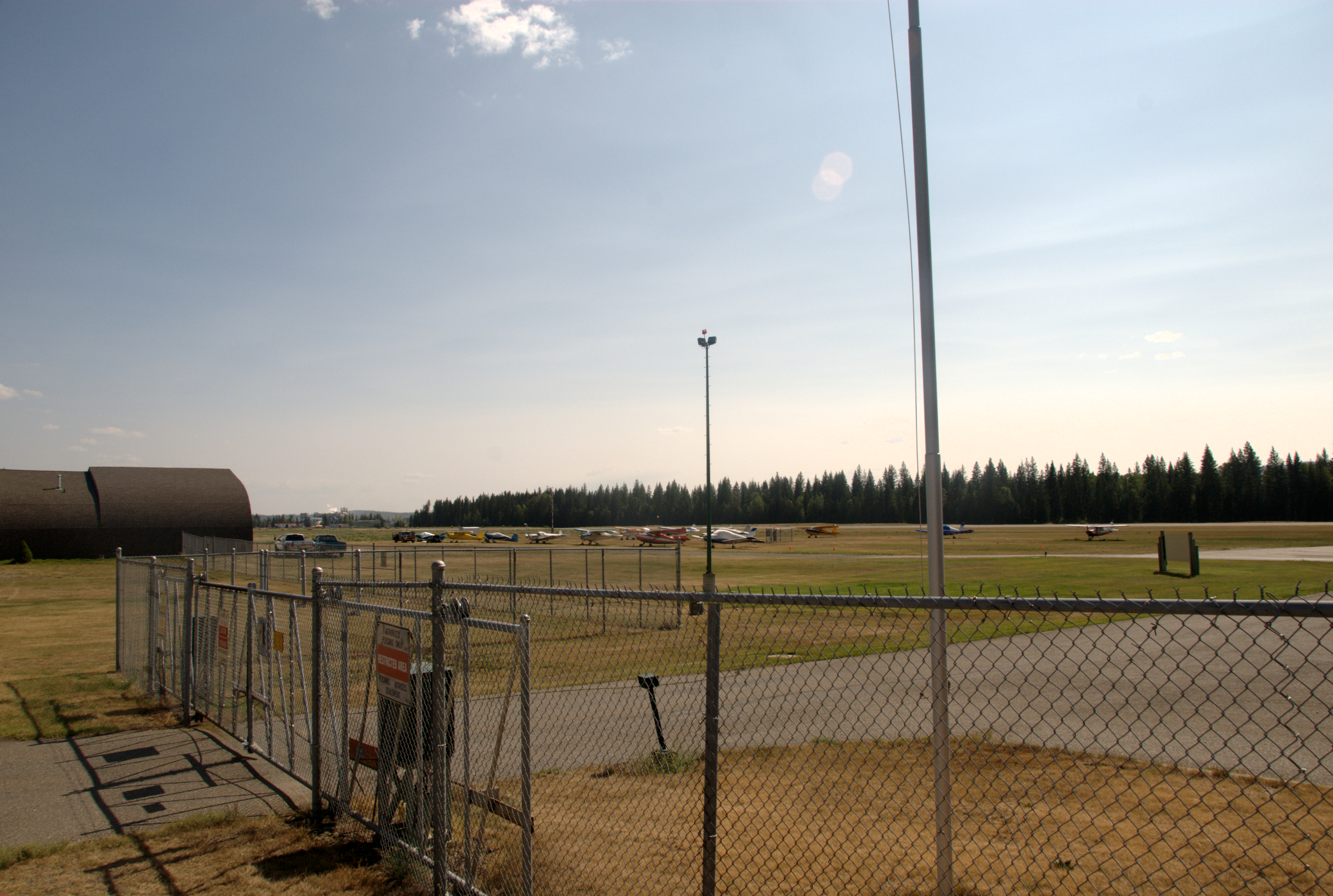
Southward from airport security gate, Quesnel, 2010.

In 2013, Northern Development provided a $244,815 grant to expand the 4,880 m^{2} (52,500 ft^{2}) apron by 2,090 m^{2} (22,500 ft^{2}). By 2015, the annual airshow had become one of the biggest in Canada.

In 2021, the airport received a $7,162,526 federal grant to rehabilitate the runway, taxiway and apron. In 2023, the airport applied for a $491,500 federal grant to replace a sweeper.

The city owns and operates the 264 ha (650 acres) site. The infrastructure includes two corporate hangars and some small private ones. CMA provides scheduled services. Other users are the Quesnel Flying Club, medevacs, and charter flights for the forestry, oil and gas, and mining industries. Low fog remains a navigational hazard.

== Airlines and destinations ==
Airlines	Destinations
Central Mountain Air	Vancouver, Williams Lake (Outbound only)
Pacific Coastal Airlines	Vancouver

== Accidents and incidents ==
- March 1933: An engine on a Ryan B-1, operated by Ginger Coote, was being preheated by a blowtorch when the aircraft caught fire and was destroyed. Also that month, a Loening Amphibian owned by Canadian Airways hit an obstruction on takeoff. When the pilot restarted the engine after a forced landing, the aircraft burst into flames and was destroyed.
- December 1968: A Cessna 172 crashed in a grove of birch trees about 400 m (1,300 ft) west of the airport, killing the two on board. Alcohol was a factor.
- March 1982: A Northern Mountain Helicopters Bell 206 JetRanger crashed in a gulley in a heavily-treed area about 20 km (12 mi) northwest of Quesnel, killing the pilot.
