= Margaret Fane Rutledge =

Pioneering Canadian pilot

- Born: Margaret Fane; 13 April 1914; Edmonton, Alberta, Canada
- Died: 2 December 2004; Richmond, British Columbia
- Spouse: Keith Rutledge

Margaret Fane Rutledge (13 April 1914 – 2 December 2004), was a pioneering Canadian pilot who founded the Flying Seven, an aerial display team of women who performed at air shows in the 1930s.

== Biography ==
Rutledge was born Margaret Fane in Edmonton, Alberta in 1914. She was one of six children. Her parents were interested in airplanes, having taken the first flight to land in Alberta's capital and her father having built his own glider. She became fascinated by planes and managed to take lessons at Edmonton and Northern Alberta Aero Club started by a World War I pilot and ace Wop May. Rutledge got her private pilot’s license on 2 October 1933. She went on to get her commercial license on 29 August 1935. Rutledge was the first woman in Western Canada to achieve this.

When she moved to Vancouver, Rutledge discovered another six women pilots, Tosca Trasolini, Rolie Moore, Jean Pike, Betsy Flaherty, Alma Gilbert and Elianne Roberge. She began both a local chapter of the Amelia Earhart group the Ninety-Nines and the aerial display team The Flying Seven, which formed on 15 October 1936.

The group gave flying displays over the city and became well known at flying exhibitions. The Royal Canadian Air Force invited them to a meeting but on discovering they were all women refused them as pilots on the outbreak of World War II. The seven instead used their displays to raise funds for the RCAF.

Rutledge worked for the Bridge River & Cariboo Airways, which later became Ginger Coote Airways. She was primarily a radio operator for the airline. Before the war she had been assigned to Zeballos, British Columbia, a mining town. Rutledge was one of three unmarried women in the town with a population of over 1500. Ginger Coote had hired her on the recommendation of Grant McConachie, then owner of the Yukon Southern Air Transport. Thanks to him, word of her job made her a celebrity with newspapers talking about the woman pilot operating the radio station. While Rutledge had been unable to get a job as a pilot she sometimes took over Coote's role flying planes from isolated communities while working there. Her last flight as a pilot took place when McConachie invited her to join him on a Lockheed 14 passenger plane test flight.

Rutledge went on to work in administration for Canadian Pacific Airways. In 1956 she married Keith Rutledge. She is remembered at Okanagan College by the Margaret Fane Rutledge Award in Aviation.
