= Walter Gilbert (disambiguation) =

Walter Gilbert (born 1932) is an American scientist and Nobel laureate.

Walter Gilbert may also refer to:

- Walter Gilbert (American football) (1915–1979), American football player
- Walter Gilbert (cricketer) (1853–1924), English cricketer
- Walter Gilbert (pilot) (1899–1986), Canadian aviator
- Walter Gilbert (sculptor) (1871–1946), English sculptor
- Wally Gilbert (Walter John Gilbert, 1900–1958), American athlete in baseball, football and basketball
- Sir Walter Gilbert, 1st Baronet (1785–1853), British East India Company Army officer
- Walter fitz Gilbert of Cadzow (died c. 1346), Scottish nobleman

== See also ==
- Walter G. Alexander (Walter Gilbert Alexander, 1880–1953), American physician and politician
- Walter Dinsdale (Walter Gilbert Dinsdale, 1916–1982), Canadian politician
