= Ginger Coote Airways =

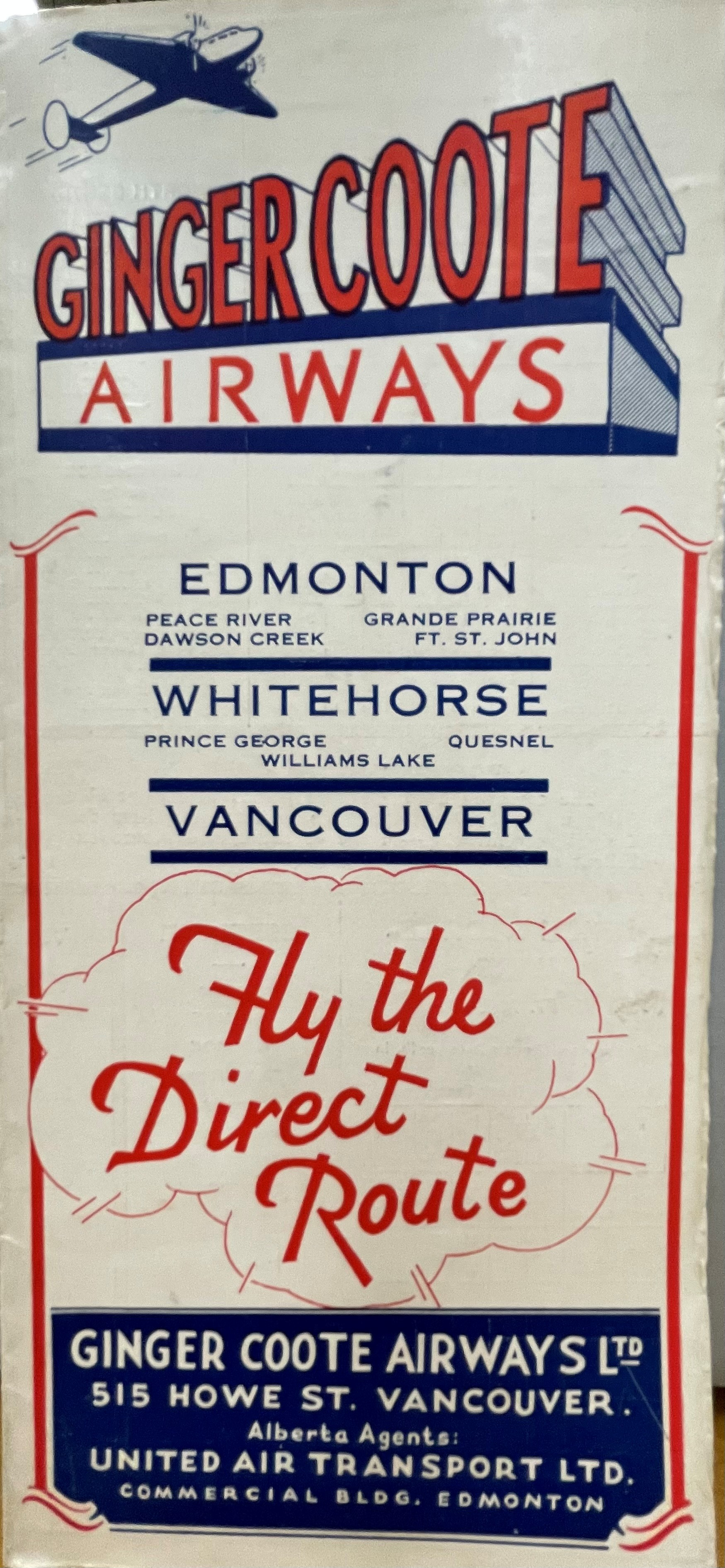
Photograph of the front cover of a Ginger Coote Airways timetable, circa 1938-1941. It lists three major destinations and a contact address for the airline in Vancouver, British Columbia.

Ginger Coote Airways (GCA) is a defunct passenger and charter airline that was based in Vancouver, British Columbia and often used Wells Harbour at Lulu Island as a base, 1938-1942.

GCA was owned and operated by Canadian aviator Russell L. "Ginger" Coote (June 21, 1898 - January 10, 1970), who learned to fly as a pilot with the Royal Flying Corps Canada during World War I. Post-war, Coote became part-owner of Bridge River & Cariboo Airways and eventually became the airline's president. In 1938, the airline changed its name to Ginger Coote Airways.

Employees of the airline included Coote as a pilot and co-director; his father, Andrew Coote, as co-director; and Margaret Fane Rutledge as a radio operator. At times, Rutledge also dispatched and served as a co-pilot. Coote also hired Russ Baker, who later founded Pacific Western Airlines, as a pilot and to restore a de Havilland Moth. GCA often flew from Vancouver, British Columbia to Zeballos, British Columbia. Other destinations included Edmonton, Prince George, and Whitehorse.

In 1941, Coote sold the airline, and in 1942 it was absorbed into Canadian Pacific Air Lines, along with several other smaller airlines.

== Historical fleet ==
- Fairchild 51
- D.H.83 Fox Moth
- Noorduyn Norseman
- Waco YKS-6

== Accidents and incidents ==
- May 27, 1938: A Fairchild 51 (CF-AUX) crashed near Port Alberni, British Columbia while en route from Vancouver to Zeballos, killing 4 persons (1 crew, pilot Len Waagens, and 3 passengers, Mary Nicholson (wife of George Nicholson, postmaster and airline agent at Zeballos), Charles Rumsey, and H. Boyd.).
- October 29, 1940: A Noorduyn Norseman (CF-AZE) engine caught fire in flight while en route from Vancouver to Zeballos. During the forced landing, the single-engine aircraft flipped upside down, bursting into flames, injuring all 4 persons (1 crew and 3 passengers) on board and resulting in the aircraft's destruction.
- A court case was brought against Ginger Coote Airways for injuries sustained in a forced landing when an aircraft caught on fire during a November 1940 flight operated by the airline.

== See also ==
- List of defunct airlines of Canada
