= Canadian Pacific Air Lines Flight 301 =

1962 aviation accident

Coordinates: 21.3202°N 157.9147°W

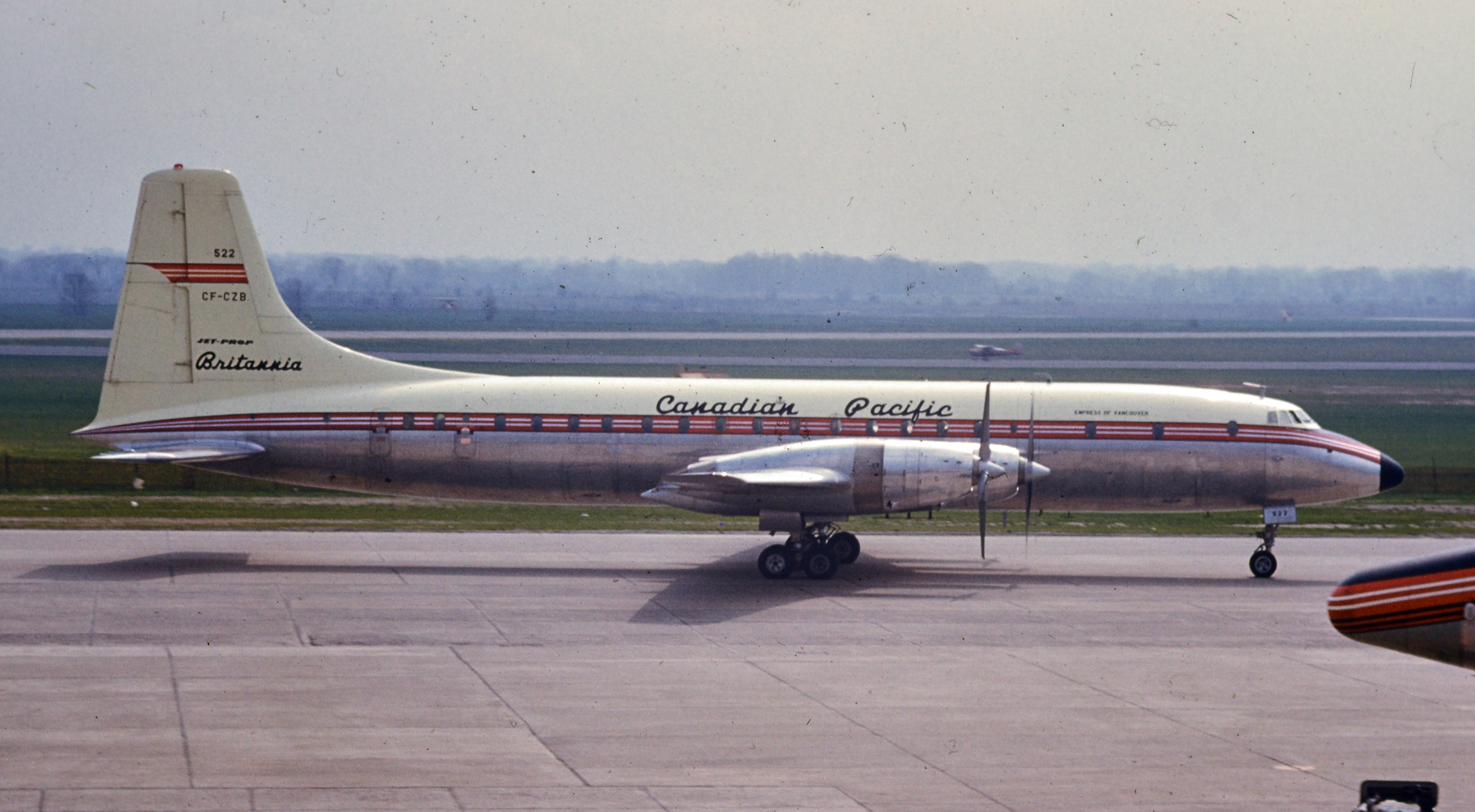
- Aircraft involved in the incident at Malton (Toronto) Airport c. 1959

Accident
- Date: 22 July 1962
- Summary: Crashed after a failed go-around on approach
- Site: Honolulu International Airport, Honolulu, Hawaii, United States

Aircraft
- Aircraft type: Bristol Britannia 314
- Aircraft name: Empress of Lima
- Operator: Canadian Pacific Air Lines
- Registration: CF-CZB
- Flight origin: Honolulu International Airport, Honolulu, Hawaii, United States
- Destination: Nadi International Airport, Fiji
- Occupants: 40
- Passengers: 29
- Crew: 11
- Fatalities: 27
- Injuries: 13
- Survivors: 13

Canadian Pacific Air Lines Flight 301 was a scheduled passenger flight from Honolulu, Hawaii to Nadi, Fiji. On 22 July 1962, it was being operated by a Bristol Britannia 314 four-engine turboprop airliner of Canadian Pacific Air Lines, registered CF-CZB. On departure from Honolulu International Airport, the aircraft had engine problems; while attempting a subsequent return and landing on three engines, the crew initiated a go-around that resulted in the plane crashing on the airfield, killing 27 of the 40 on board. It was the worst civil air carrier accident in Hawaii's history.

== Accident ==
Shortly after take-off from Honolulu, the crew received an engine fire warning for the number one engine, which they feathered. They then jettisoned fuel before returning to Honolulu 40 minutes later. Their three-engined approach appeared to be normal, but at the last minute the crew decided to go around and attempt another approach.

The aircraft then banked and veered to the left, and the left wing tip hit the ground about 550' from the center of the runway. The aircraft disintegrated as it moved across the airfield before hitting some heavy earth-moving equipment. Apart from the rear fuselage and tail, the aircraft was destroyed by fire. Thirteen on board escaped, but 7 crew and 20 passengers were killed. As stated in accident investigation report located at rosap.ntl.bts.gov, after take off stewardess Huebner, was working with stewardess Nancy Chalmers, saw captain Jennings in left seat, first officer Norton in right seat, second officer Farr in middle seat, navigator Hill in navigator seat. Check captain Giguere, first officer Eldred and navigator McLennan were in club compartment located behind the flight deck. Pages 19,20,21 &22 of the report lists information on all the crew members.

== Aircraft ==
The aircraft, a Bristol Britannia 314 four-engined turboprop, was built in the United Kingdom, and first flew on 14 April 1958. It was delivered new to Canadian Pacific Air Lines on 29 April 1958, and was originally named Empress of Vancouver (later renamed Empress of Lima).

== Probable cause ==
The accident investigation board concluded the probable cause of the accident was "the attempted three-engine go-around, when the aircraft was in a full landing configuration, at insufficient airspeed and altitude to maintain control."

- World Accident Summary. Civil Aviation Authority (United Kingdom). 1974. ISBN 0-903083-44-2.
- Eastwood, Tony; John Roach (1991). Turbo Prop Airliner Production List. The Aviation Hobby Shop. ISBN 0-907178-32-4.
