= Pacific Western Airlines Flight 3801 =

1973 fatal crash of a Boeing 707-321C in Canada

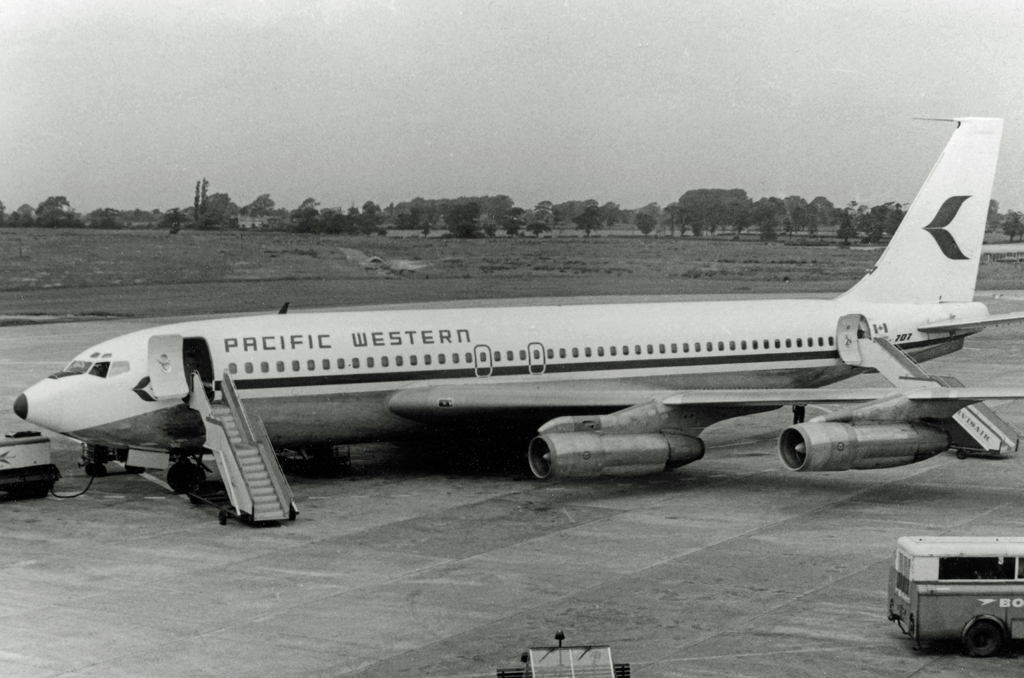
- A Pacific Western Airlines Boeing 707, similar to the aircraft involved

Accident
- Date: 2 January 1973
- Summary: CFIT; inexperienced crew and fatigue
- Site: 3 km SE of runway 29 (modern day runway 30) at Edmonton International Airport, Canada

Aircraft
- Aircraft type: Boeing 707-321C
- Operator: Pacific Western Airlines for Trans International Airlines
- Call sign: INTERNATIONAL 3801
- Registration: CF-PWZ
- Flight origin: Ellinikon International Airport, Athens, Greece
- 1st stopover: Los Rodeos Airport, Tenerife, Canary Islands, Spain
- 2nd stopover: Santa Maria International Airport, Santa Maria, Azores, Portugal
- 3rd stopover: Greater Moncton International Airport, New Brunswick, Canada
- Last stopover: Toronto International Airport, Ontario, Canada
- Destination: Edmonton International Airport, Alberta, Canada
- Occupants: 5
- Passengers: 2
- Crew: 3
- Fatalities: 5
- Survivors: 0

Pacific Western Airlines Flight 3801 was a scheduled international cargo flight operating from Athens Ellinikon International Airport to Edmonton International Airport with stopovers at 4 other airports. On 2 January 1973, the aircraft operating the flight, a Boeing 707, crashed while on approach to runway 29 at Edmonton, killing all 5 crew members and 86 cattle onboard.

== Background ==
=== Aircraft ===
The aircraft involved in the accident was an 8 year old Boeing 707-321C (manufactured in 1964) registered as CF-PWZ. It had the MSN of 18826/389. The plane had gone through 33,509 total flight hours before the crash. The aircraft had first been put in service with Continental Airlines before being handed over to PWA in 1972.

=== Crew ===
The captain on board was a 53 year old male who had been working for the airline for 19 years. He had 18,680 flight hours, with 2,552 on the 707. The co-pilot was a 27 year old male and was much less experienced than the captain, only having 2,800 flight hours, and having 1,200 on the type. The flight engineer was 49, and had an unspecified amount of flight hours. This flight was the first officer's first flight in 6 weeks, and it was the last check ride for him, so he could be certified as a first officer.

== Accident ==
Before arriving in Toronto, the aircraft had embarked on a flight from Athens with 3 other stopovers in Tenerife, Santa Maria, and Moncton. When the aircraft arrived in Moncton, the flight would be delayed for 24 hours, and when the airline attempted to charter the same crew, they realized that the crew would not get sufficient sleep to continue, and therefore called for a relief crew to do the remainder of the flight. The relief crew arrived at 03:00 GMT, and the flight from Moncton to Toronto occurred without any discrepancies. At 20:00 GMT, the cattle pens were installed into the aircraft for the flight to Edmonton. During the time from when the crew arrived in Moncton for the flight and up to the crash, they failed to get sufficient sleep.

Later, the 86 cattle were loaded onto the aircraft. Two helpers were also boarded onto the flight to watch over the cattle during the flight. Flight 3801 took off from Toronto for Edmonton at 04:47 GMT. The flight was routine until beginning descent, as the aircraft cruised at 35,000 ft while making intermediate contact with air traffic controllers. As the crew started the descent, they reported to company operations that they had suffered a failure in the #4 generator. Afterwards, everything went as scheduled until the approach. The final contact with the crew was the controller granting the landing clearance, with the last words spoken to ATC being "Ah, roger." According to impact marks, the aircraft hit the ground nose up, with the landing gear down and locked along with the flaps being down to an unknown amount. The tail then struck power lines, disconnecting from the main wreckage. The aircraft slammed into the ground with the engines running at an estimated 90% power. All 5 people and 86 cattle were killed due to blunt force trauma.

== Investigation ==
An inquiry into the accident was swiftly formed after the accident. When the black boxes were recovered and examined, it was found that the CVR had been so severely burnt so that no information could be recovered, while the FDR had ceased recording approximately a week before the accident. However, most of the cockpit instruments were intact, leading the investigators to find that the aircraft had been attempting a go-around with a pitch angle of +8° when they crashed, which nearly averted the accident. During this time, the vertical speed increased from -1,500 fpm to -550 fpm and up. It was also found that the crew were heavily fatigued, which is thought to have heavily contributed to the accident. The investigation found that the first officer had been in control, and while also being fatigued, he was inexperienced, and might have reverted to procedure for that of a Boeing 737.

== Crash site ==
The main wreckage of the aircraft was removed and presumably scrapped. However, in an attempt to renovate the site into a park with a memorial, many pieces of wreckage were discovered and turned in to local authorities.
