= Russ Baker (pilot) =

Canadian bush pilot and founder of Pacific Western Airlines

Francis Russell Baker (1910–1958) was a Canadian bush pilot and founder of Pacific Western Airlines.

== Early life ==
Baker was born in St. James, Manitoba (now part of Winnipeg) on January 31, 1910.

The boy attended Isaac Brock Elementary School and finished his public education at age 14. He then took up shorthand, typing, penmanship, English, spelling, and bookkeeping at Success Commercial College in 1924/5. He worked in the offices of Western Canada Airways. In 1928, he began flight training with that company at Kirkfield Park. He obtained his commercial pilot licence on October 29, 1929. However, from 1931 to 1933, he worked for his father's company, Western Gypsum Products.

== Airlines ==
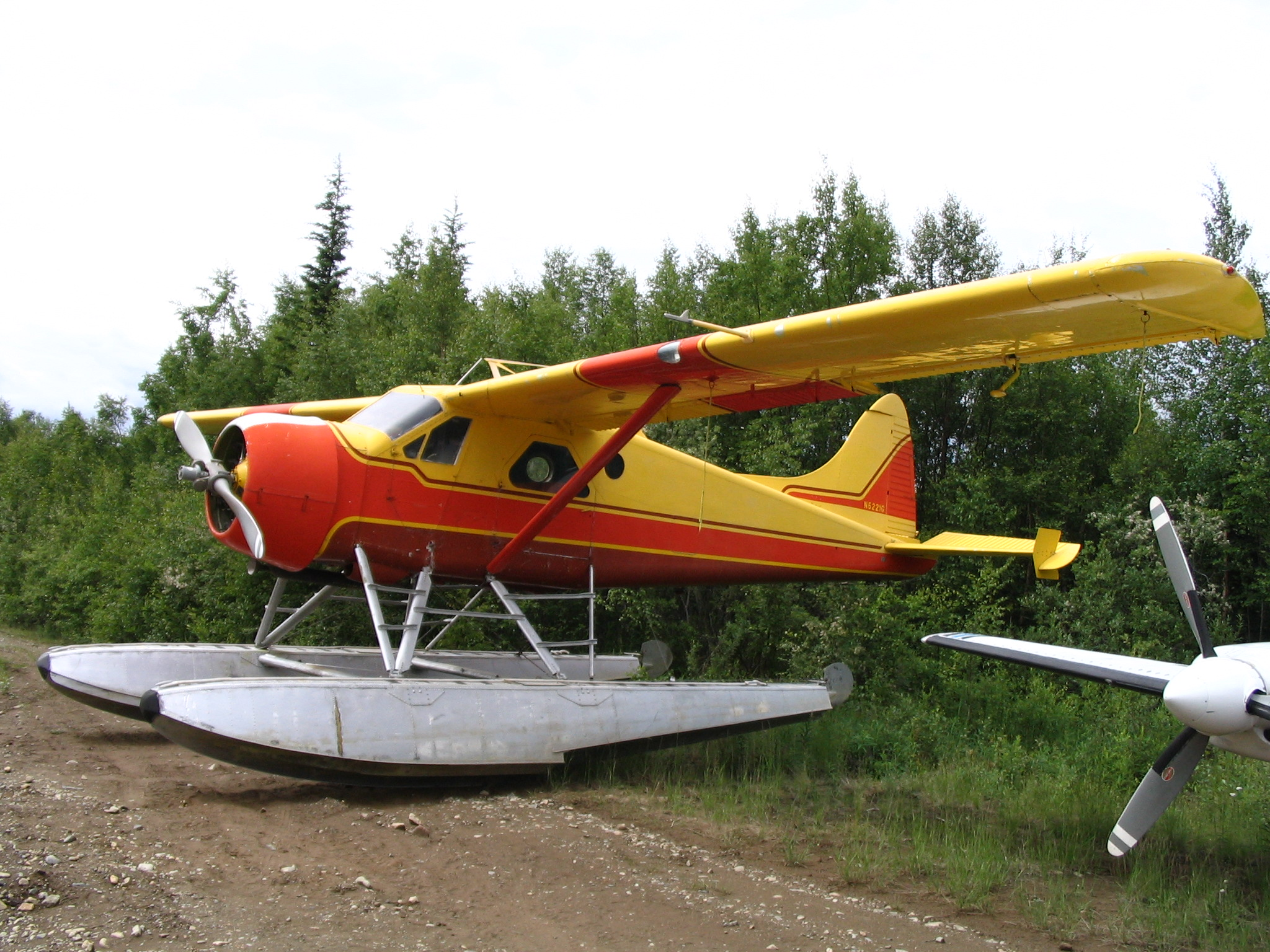
The first commercial Beaver floatplane was acquired by Central British Columbia Airlines, precursor to Pacific Western Airlines

Baker got his start as an entrepreneur in aviation by restoring a De Havilland Fox Moth for Ginger Coote at Gun Lake (British Columbia) in the winter of 1936/7. Later Baker made Fort St. James his base as he freighted supplies to mining operators in the North. He worked for Grant McConachie's company United Air Transport. Later Punch Dickins offered him a job with Canadian Airways in the same region.

In January 1942 Baker rescued the crews of three B-26 bombers that had made an emergency landing between Fort Nelson, British Columbia and Watson Lake, Yukon where there was a refueling station. The mishap occurred the 16th of January, and Baker eventually located the planes and crews. To an improvised runway he flew a dozen missions over several days to extract 24 crewmen and two officers. The Norden bombsights were recovered from the downed aircraft. He was recommended by Lt. Robert O. Cork for the Air Medal which Baker was awarded March 22, 1948, in Vancouver by the U.S. consul George D. Andrews.

In February 1947 Pierre Berton was assigned the northern beat by Hal Straight of the Vancouver Sun. Baker took Berton across the Rocky Mountains and up the "headless valley" of the Nahanni River. The newspaper series was named Best Adventure Series of 1947 by International News Service. Berton wrote the foreword to Wings over the West (1984) by John Condit. Berton described Baker's mountain flying:

Baker flew his Fox Moths and ancient Junkers through the angry ocean of peaks that sprawl across the midriff of British Columbia. He knew these mountains as well as we know our own street corners. When the fog hung heavy on the cordillera, he found his way home by recognizing the granite tips of the mountains that poked above the cloud blanket. The dreadful downdrafts that have caused more than one pilot's death held no terror for him. These Niagaras of air, pouring off the ridges, can send a plane plummeting a thousand feet in a minute, but Baker wrestled his aircraft through the turbulence like a horseman on a bronco. He had the physique of a boxer and the strength of an ox and needed both in that tempest-tossed land.

Baker died of a heart attack in his Vancouver home on November 15, 1958 and was buried in Fort St. James.

== Works cited ==
- Condit, John (1984). Wings over the West: Russ Baker and the Rise of Pacific Western Airlines. Harbour Publishing. ISBN 0-920080-49-9.
- Pigott, Peter (2000). Flying Canucks III: Famous Canadian Aviators. Madeira Park, BC: Harbour Publishing. pp. 135–149. ISBN 978-1-55017-224-9.
