= Canadian Pacific Air Lines Flight 322 =

1968 aviation accident in Canada

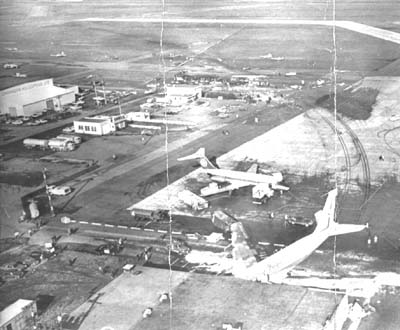
- An aerial view of the crash site

Accident
- Date: February 7, 1968
- Summary: Runway excursion
- Site: Vancouver International Airport, Vancouver, British Columbia, Canada
- Total fatalities: 2
- Total injuries: 17
- Total survivors: 60

Aircraft
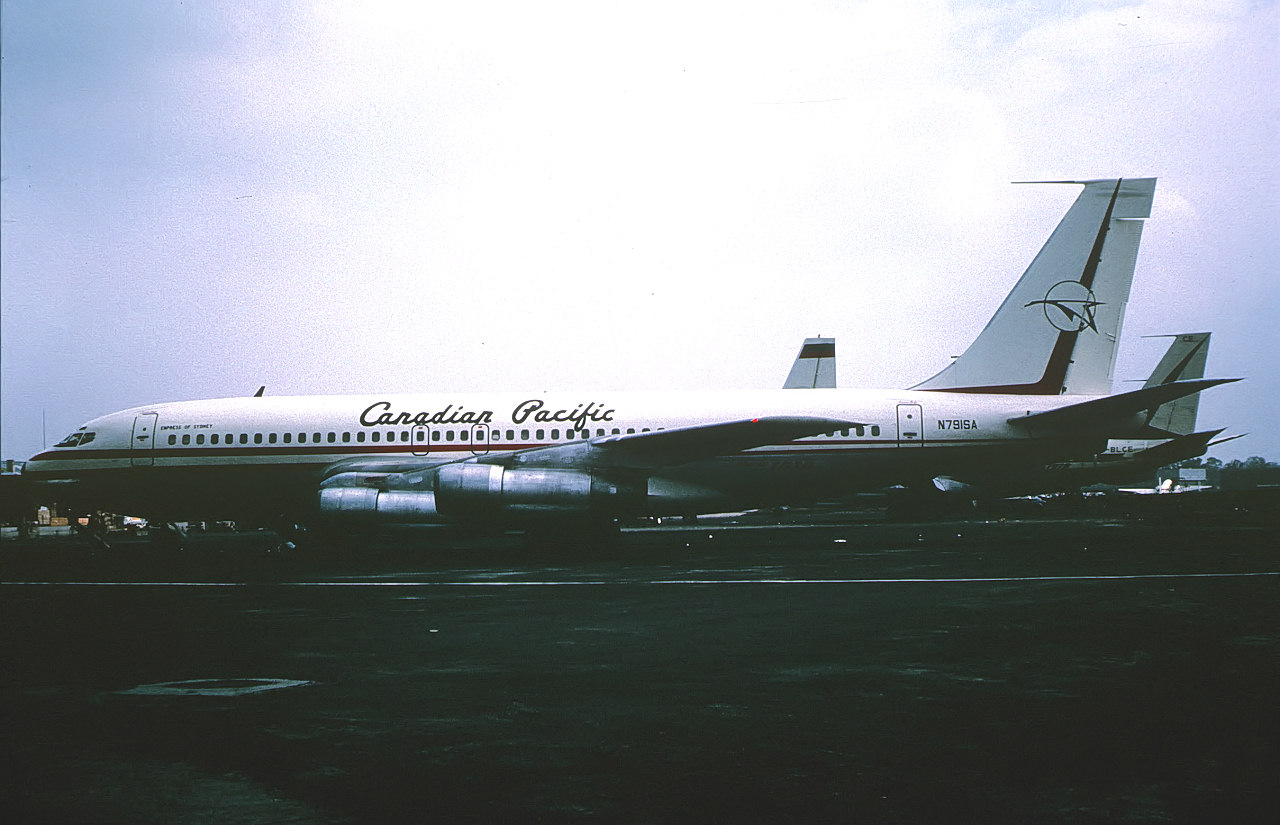
- N791SA, the aircraft involved in the accident
- Aircraft type: Boeing 707-138B
- Aircraft name: Empress of Sydney
- Operator: Canadian Pacific Air Lines
- IATA flight No.: CP332
- ICAO flight No.: CPC332
- Call sign: EMPRESS 332
- Registration: N791SA
- Flight origin: Honolulu International Airport, Honolulu, Hawaii, United States
- Destination: Vancouver International Airport, Vancouver, British Columbia, Canada
- Occupants: 61
- Passengers: 52
- Crew: 9
- Fatalities: 1
- Injuries: 17
- Survivors: 60

Ground casualties
- Ground fatalities: 1

On February 7, 1968, a Boeing 707 operating as Canadian Pacific Air Lines Flight 322 suffered a runway excursion and crashed into multiple parked aircraft, vehicles and two buildings while landing at Vancouver International Airport in Vancouver, British Columbia, Canada, killing a crew member and one person on the ground.

== Background ==
=== Aircraft ===
The aircraft involved in the accident was N791SA, a Boeing 707-138B operated by Canadian Pacific Airlines and powered by four Pratt & Whitney JT3D turbojet engines. It was manufactured in April 1959 for Australian airline Qantas under the registration VH-EBC and name City of Melbourne. The aircraft was later renamed as City of Canberra. It was leased to Canadian Pacific in October 1967 and finally named Empress of Sydney.

=== Passengers and crew ===
There were 52 passengers and nine crew members on board the flight. The crew consisted of a pilot, a co-pilot, a navigator, a flight engineer and five flight attendants.

== Accident ==
The aircraft departed Vancouver International Airport at 6:12 on February 6. The approach to Vancouver was completed in poor visibility due to foggy conditions. Following a wrong approach configuration, the aircraft landed 1,000 feet past the runway threshold and to the right of the centerline. After touchdown, the captain decided to make a go-around when they lost control. On the second touchdown, the starboard tires blew, causing the aircraft to slew right, veer off Runway 08, go through the tarmac and collide with and destroy four parked aircraft, several vehicles, a fence and two buildings. A fuel tank ruptured, causing a fire that killed one person and burned several cars parked nearby. 33-year-old flight attendant Martinus Verhoef and 44-year-old airport employee Elmer Nedcalf who was in the maintenance utility shed that was struck were killed, while 17 others were injured and 43 escaped unharmed. The aircraft was destroyed and written off.

== Investigation ==
The probable cause was failure to evaluate known terminal weather information and to discontinue the attempt to land.

== Aftermath ==
The wreckage of the aircraft was moved to an empty ramp behind Canadian Pacific's hangar and sat there for several months before eventually being placed onto a barge and taken to a waterside where the useful parts were salvaged.
