= Walter Gilbert (pilot) =

Canadian bush pilot and a founder of Pacific Western Airlines

Walter Edwin Gilbert (8 March 1899 – 18 June 1986) was a Canadian bush pilot and one of the founders of Pacific Western Airlines.

Gilbert was born in Cornwall, Ontario. His father worked dredging the Saint Lawrence River. Father and son travelled to Lakeside near Montreal in 1910 to observe an airshow. In World War I, Gilbert joined the Royal Flying Corps, Toronto. He saw little air combat and returned to Canada to work in the Saint Lawrence. In 1921 he was a civilian flyer for the Canadian Air Force in British Columbia. In 1927 he flew forest patrols for the Forest Service. Gilbert landed a regular position with Western Canada Airways in 1928. He was posted to Cranberry Portage, Manitoba as service was in demand for a nearby Sherritt Gordon mine. Settlements along the Mackenzie River were delivered their mail by air. Punch Dickins introduced Gilbert to the run from Fort McMurray to Aklavik. In 1939 Gilbert's experiences on this route were recorded in Arctic Pilot by Kathleen Shackleton.

In 1930 Gilbert took Major L. T. Burwash on a search for Franklin's lost expedition. Their aerial photographs of the Beaufort Sea were much appreciated by navigators and geographers. Gilbert became a member of The Explorers Club, a fellow of the Royal Canadian Geographical Society and of the Royal Geographical Society. For his service to Canadian aviation he was awarded the McKee Trophy in 1933.

Charles Lindbergh piloting his Lockheed Sirius was in Aklavik in August 1931 and needed assistance getting aloft. As Morton reports

Gilbert in 'SK taxied ahead of them to create waves on the surface and to let the slipstream from his propeller assist the heavily loaded Lockheed Sirius get up on his step.

In 1939, as regional operations chief for Western Canada Airways, Gilbert directed Russ Baker to Fort St. James, British Columbia, near Pinchi Lake where service was needed to fly mercury. The Consolidated Mining and Smelting Company of Canada Limited was supplying the increased demands brought on by war. The mine manager Emil Bronlund supplied Baker 400 flasks of mercury, 75 pounds each, in June 1940 to fly out.

After the war Baker and Gilbert started Central British Columbia Airlines with financing from Karl John Springer. The company was incorporated 8 July 1945 and for a while Gilbert was President. He and Baker stayed at Devonshire Hotel in Vancouver when the north country was undergoing freeze-up and spring break-up. Over-expenditures were repaid by Baker, but Gilbert balked and was fired by Springer in June 1947.

From Chilliwack Gilbert provided crop dusting service. Later he moved to Point Roberts and became an American. He died 18 June 1986.
