= United Air Transport =

United Air Transport was a Canadian airline founded in 1933 by George W. “Grant” McConachie and R.B. Phillips. McConachie, an experienced pilot, had previously operated Independent Airways. McConachie established that airline in 1931 to transport freight and supplies to the Two Brothers gold mine in British Columbia, owned by Phillips’ family.

The airline expanded its operations to the Yukon on July 5, 1937, when McConachie piloted a float-equipped Ford Tri-Motor to Whitehorse, landing on the Yukon River to launch a new mail service route. A month later, in August 1937, service was further extended to Dawson City, strengthening the airline's presence in the region.

On January 16, 1938, United Air Transport was renamed Yukon Southern Air Transport (YSAT), reflecting its growing role in connecting the remote communities of the Yukon and northern British Columbia. Yukon Southern Air Transport was amalgamated into Canadian Pacific Airlines in 1942, along with other nine airlines.

== Sources ==
- Finley, Maxine (1941). "Incredible Yukon Southern". Western Aviation Magazine. 21.
