= Kathleen Shackleton =

Irish portrait painter and journalist

- Born: 5 February 1884; Dublin
- Died: 10 July 1961 (aged 77)
- Occupation: Artist
- Known for: Portraits
- Relatives: Ernest Shackleton (brother)

Kathleen Shackleton MBE (5 February 1884 – 10 July 1961) was an Irish portrait painter and journalist.

== Biography ==
Kathleen Shackleton was born in Dublin on 5 February 1884. Her family moved to Sydenham, London shortly after she was born. Shackleton was educated in Sydenham Girls’ High School. She then emigrated in 1912 to be with her sister, Eleanor, who was living in Canada. When she was living in Montreal, Shackleton worked as a journalist and illustrator for the newspaper Montreal Star. In 1934, she testified in a murder trial, having heard screams near Cap-des-Rosiers, a cliff in Gaspe, while sketching there the previous year. She married in Canada but the marriage was short-lived as six months later Shackleton applied for a divorce on the basis that her husband's previous divorce was invalid. She then returned to London where she was later awarded an MBE for her work during the war. After the war she reported from the new Czechoslovakia.

Shackleton also traveled around Canada supported by various companies and produced portraits of their employees. These included employees of the Hudson's Bay Company, Price Brothers and the Canadian Pacific Railway Company. She also produced portraits of politicians and businessmen. Shackleton also worked with Walter Gilbert in writing his memoirs. By 1950 Shackleton had returned to Europe where she worked and lived with her sister Gladys. They ran an antique and souvenir shop at the Chichester Cathedral. Her brother Ernest Shackleton was an Antarctic explorer.
