= Russell L. "Ginger" Coote =

Ginger Coote
- Born: Russell Leslie Coote; June 17, 1899; Chilliwack, British Columbia, Canada
- Died: January 10, 1970 (aged 70); Essondale, British Columbia, Canada
- Citizenship: Canada
- Occupation: Bush pilot
- Spouse(s): Helen Georgina Eliza Chadsey, Verna Gertrude Lambeth
- Awards: British War Medal, Victory Medal

Russell L. "Ginger" Coote (1899-1970) was a Canadian bush pilot, owner of Ginger Coote Airways, and served in the Royal Flying Corps during World War I.

== Early life ==
Russell (sometimes seen as Russel or R.L.) Leslie "Ginger" Coote was born June 17, 1899, in Chilliwack, British Columbia, Canada to Andrew Leslie Coote (1869-1965) and Fanny (Kirby) Coote (1869-1961). Known mostly as "Ginger" for his red hair, he was one of five children.

== World War I military service ==
In 1912, Coote joined the Chilliwack Company of the 104th Regiment as a bugler. He was mobilized in the same role in 1914. He then joined the 47th Westminster Regiment of the Canadian Expeditionary Force, also as a bugler. Coote trained in New Westminster, Vermont and England and was recognized for best shot in the regiment. At the age of 15, he was sent to France as a sniper. Coote served in the Westminster Regiment as a Captain. Later commissioned as a Lieutenant in 1917, Coote was injured at least once during his service. He also served in Belgium. Known dates of service include August 11, 1916, to April 16, 1917, and August 8–23, 1917. He later transferred to the Royal Flying Corps, where he earned his wings and did patrol work. Coote earned the British War Medal and the Victory Medal.

== Personal life and career ==
Post-war, he returned to Chilliwack and initially worked as a farmer on his family farm. However, he sold it sometime in the 1920s and bought his first aircraft. In 1929 he obtained his private pilot license and flew for Wells Air Transport. In 1933 he became part-owner of Bridge River & Caribou Airways. In 1935, Coote and his father became co-directors of the airline after buying out the others. In 1938, Coote renamed the airline to Ginger Coote Airways. He later sold the airline in 1940, although he continued to work in aviation. Coote was known for making frequent mercy flights.

Also in 1940, he was appointed flying instructor in the Royal Canadian Air Force and was posted to Air Observer School based at Edmonton, Alberta.

Other endeavors Coote engaged in include flying an Alexander Eaglerock aircraft in a 1931 air show that heralded the opening of the Chilliwack Airport as well as piloting the first air mail from Vancouver to the Yukon in 1938. He also helped found the Chilliwack Flying Club. In 1946, Coote returned to his farming roots and started a pig farm in Chilliwack.

On September 20, 1921, Coote married his first wife, Helen Georgina Eliza Chadsey (1896-1983), although the couple later divorced. They had one daughter, Jocelyn Hilda Coote (1923-1973). On June 28, 1939, He married his second wife, Verna Gertrude Lambeth (née Cruickshank) Foster (1897-1987). The couple divorced in 1943.

Coote died on January 10, 1970, in Essondale, British Columbia after an extended illness. He was survived by his third wife, Molly; his daughter, Jocelyn and a brother, Ian.

== Legacy ==
Coote was inducted into the British Columbia Aviation Hall of Fame and his name is featured on a wall of fame at Vancouver International Airport.
