= Grant McConachie =

Canadian aviator and businessman (1909–1965)

George William Grant McConachie (24 April 1909 – 29 June 1965) was a Canadian bush pilot and businessman who became CEO of Canadian Pacific Airlines (CPA).

He was born in Hamilton, Ontario, and grew up in Calder, Alberta. He developed an interest in aviation as a teen and obtained a pilot's license at age 20. Within a few years, he was running his own small fleet of bush aircraft including ski and float planes. His company delivered mail, freight, and supplies in the remote areas of the provinces of Manitoba, Saskatchewan, Alberta and into the Yukon and Northwest Territories. His knowledge of the North led to aerial exploration work on the Canol Road project and a contract with the United States government to do aerial charting for the Alaska Highway.

McConachie sold his Yukon Southern Air Transport to Canadian Pacific Air Lines in 1941. Created through the acquisition of a number of similar small airlines, the new airline appointed him its general manager.

In 1947, the board of directors elected him CPA's president and he embarked on an expansion that made the company the second largest carrier in Canada and the dominant airline of the Canadian West. In 1949, McConachie obtained landing rights at the Tokyo and Hong Kong airports that opened the door to CPA's highly successful transpacific service to Australia, Asia and the South Pacific. Under McConachie, the airline would expand with transatlantic flights to Portugal, Spain, and the Netherlands and south into Mexico and South America.

McConachie died of a heart attack on June 29, 1965, while on a business trip to Long Beach, California. In 1972, author Ronald A. Keith published his biography under the title Bush Pilot with a Briefcase.

== Honours ==
In 1945, McConachie was awarded the McKee Trophy for his pioneering contribution to Canadian aviation. In 1973, he was inducted posthumously into Canada's Aviation Hall of Fame and following its formation in 1979, the Canadian Business Hall of Fame. Named in his honour, "Grant McConachie Way" in Richmond, British Columbia, is the access artery into Vancouver International Airport, home base for Canadian Pacific Air Lines. Through the Canadian Forces and the Air Cadet League of Canada, the "810 Grant McConachie Air Cadets" was formed in 1971. McConachie Peak is also named for him. The McConachie neighbourhood, in Edmonton, Alberta, is also named for him as part of the Pilot Sound residential area.
