= Canadian Pacific Air Lines =

Airline of Canada (1942–1987)

Canadian Pacific Air Lines Lignes Aériennes Canadien Pacifique

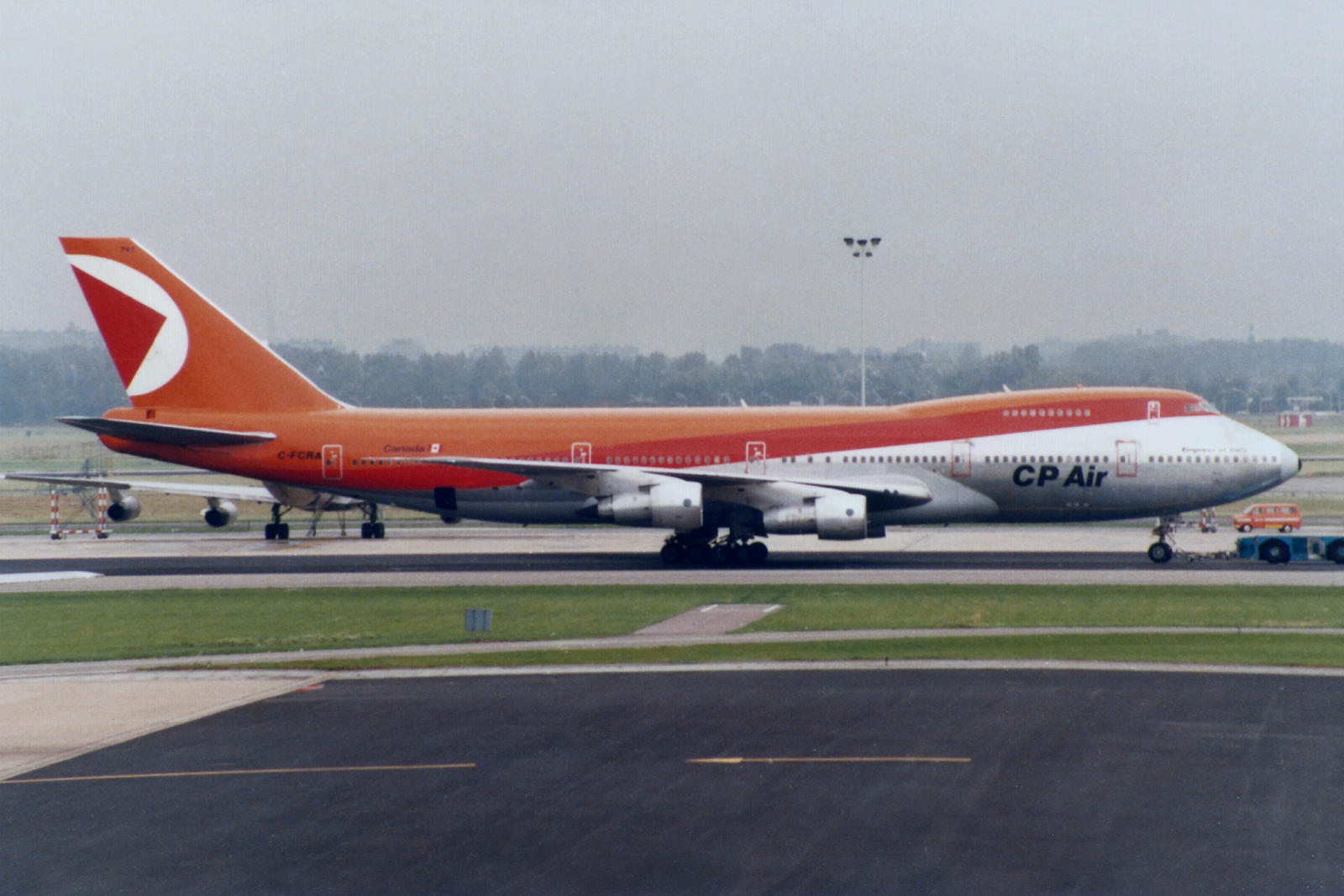
- Canadian Pacific Air Lines Boeing 747-200 in the livery of CP Air in 1985
IATA	ICAO	Call sign
CP	CPC	EMPRESS
- Founded: 1942; 84 years ago
- Ceased operations: March 27, 1987; 39 years ago (merged with Nordair and Pacific Western Airlines to form Canadian Airlines International)
- Hubs: Vancouver
- Secondary hubs: Montréal–Dorval; Toronto–Pearson
- Headquarters: Richmond, British Columbia
- Key people: Grant McConachie GM 1941-47, President 1947-65; Donald J. Carty CEO 1985-1987

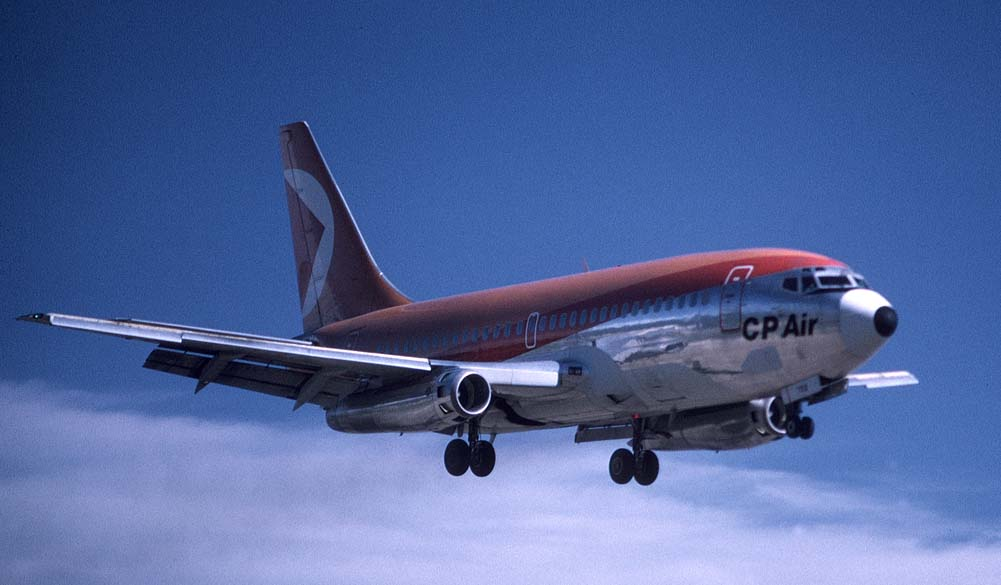
CP Air Boeing 737 landing at Whitehorse, Yukon, Canada in 1971

Canadian Pacific Air Lines was a Canadian airline that operated from 1942 to 1987. It operated under the name CP Air from 1968 to 1986. Headquartered at Vancouver International Airport in Richmond, British Columbia, it served domestic Canadian as well as international routes until it was purchased by Pacific Western Airlines and absorbed into Canadian Airlines International.

== History ==
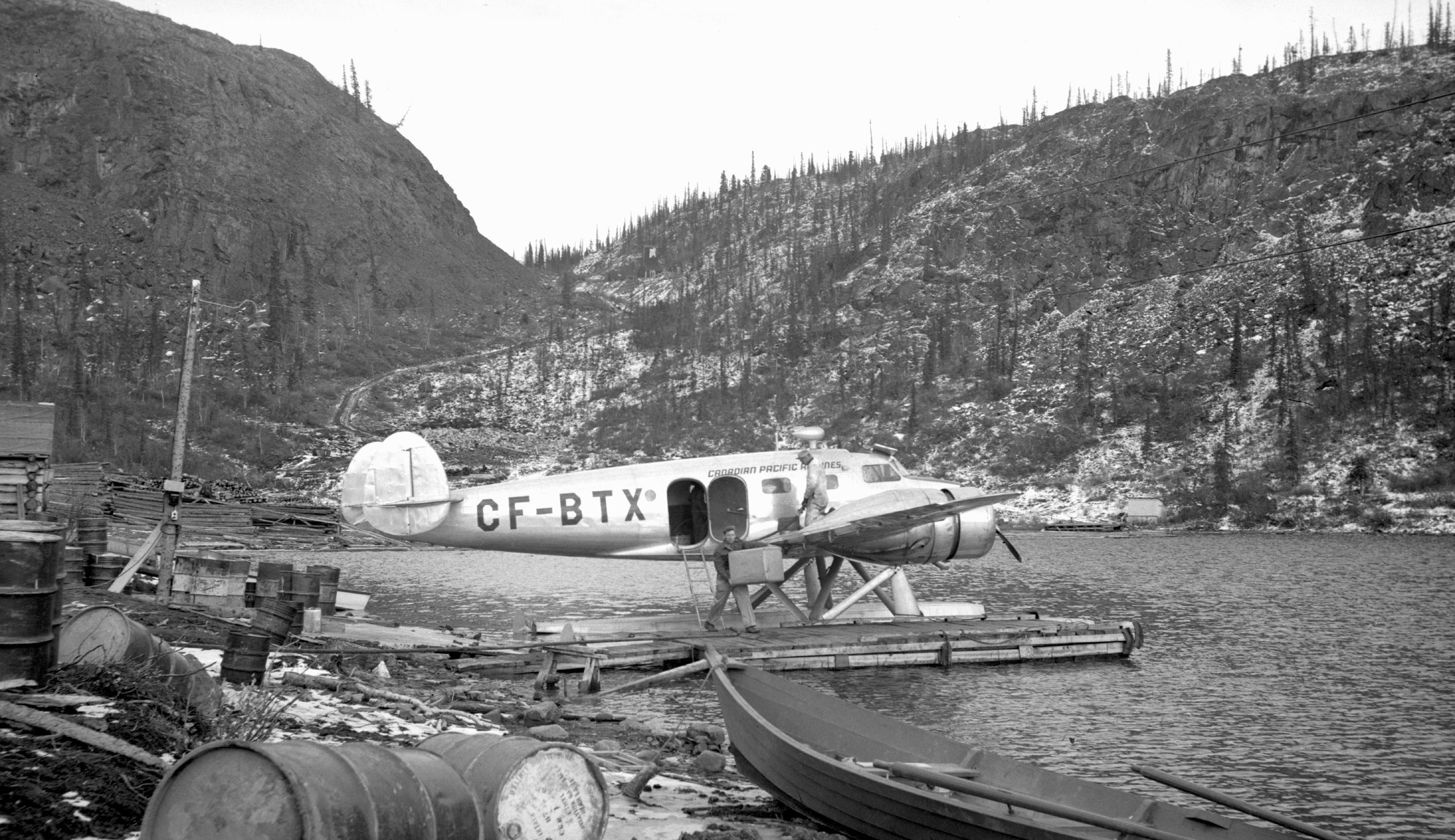
Canadian Pacific Airlines Barkley-Grow T8P-1 CF-BTX at dock in Port Radium, circa 1940-1945

In the early 1940s, the Canadian Pacific Railway Company purchased, in a short time span, ten bush airlines: Ginger Coote Airways, Yukon Southern Air Transport, Wings, Prairie Airways, Mackenzie Air Services, Arrow Airways, Starratt Airways, Quebec Airways, Montreal & Dominion Skyways, and finishing with the purchase of Canadian Airways in 1942, to form Canadian Pacific Air Lines. Early management were largely bush flying pioneers, including president Grant McConachie, superintendent Punch Dickins, and Wop May, who would become a repair depot manager in Calgary.

In 1968, Canadian Pacific Air Lines was rebranded as CP Air. The Canadian Pacific Railway Company (renamed Canadian Pacific Limited in 1971) had decided to align the airline's name and "Multimark" design to that of its other subsidiaries, including CP Hotels, CP Ships, and CP Transport (CP Rail was spun off from the parent company later).

=== Competition with TCA ===
CP Air competed with the government-owned Trans-Canada Air Lines (TCA, later Air Canada) for international and transcontinental routes for much of its history. Despite early attempts to merge into one national carrier, CP Air continued to operate routes based on its previous bush flying heritage.

The federal government established limits on domestic market share and, through international agreements, limits on which countries CP Air could fly to. This barred CP Air from the traditional routes such as London and Paris and limited their access to major Canadian routes such as Vancouver-Toronto and Toronto-New York.

=== Overseas and international routes ===
Revenue Passenger-Kilometres, scheduled flights only, in millions
Year	Traffic
1950	116
1955	288
1960	835
1965	1648
1969	3194
1971	3879
1975	6841
1980	9329
1985	10511

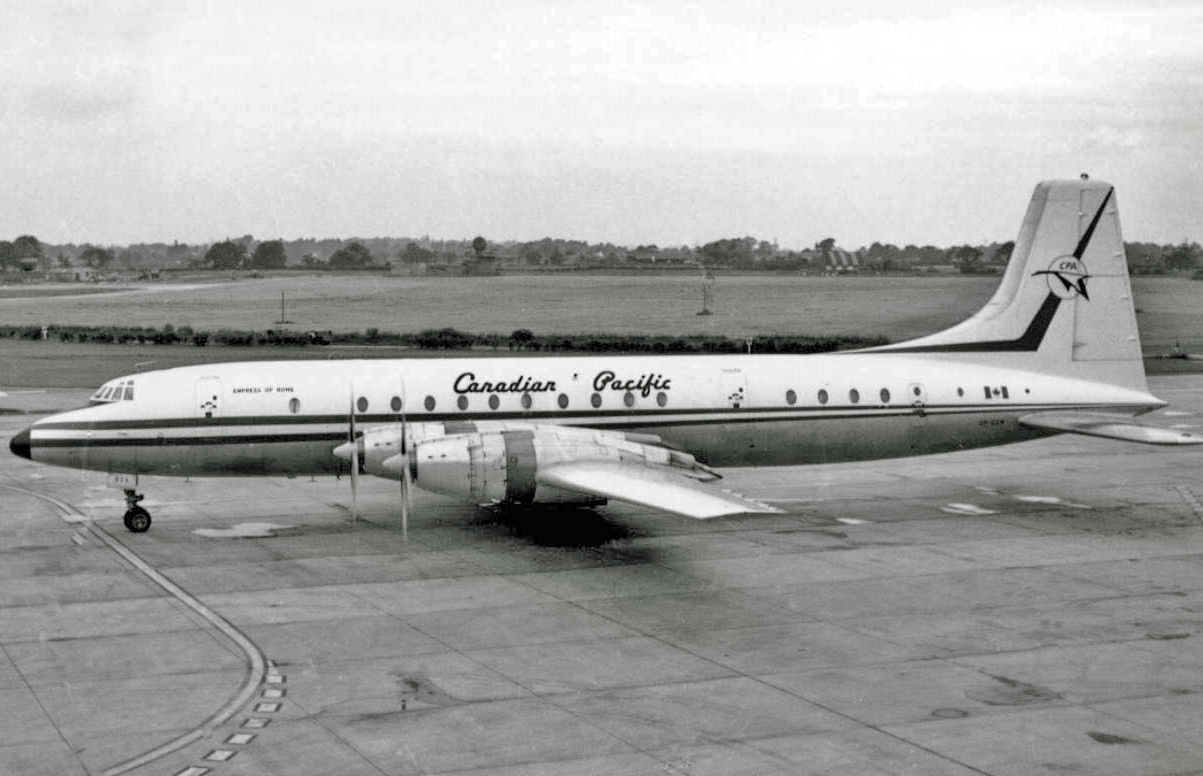
Bristol Britannia 314 "Empress of Rome" at Manchester Airport in 1965

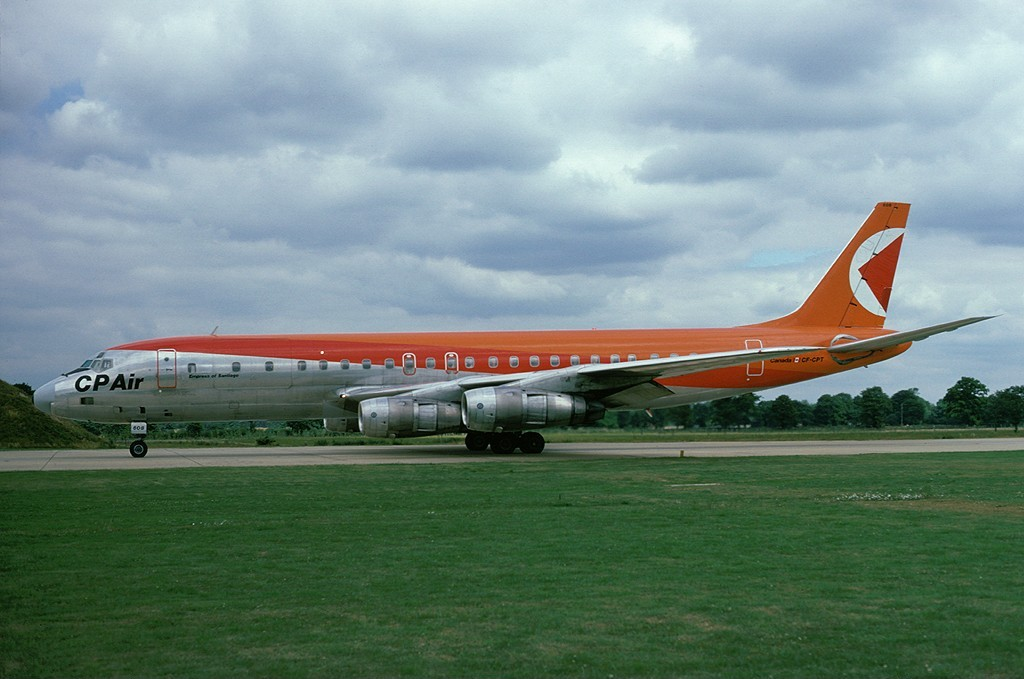
A Douglas DC-8 at Gatwick Airport in 1977

The development of the great circle or polar route to the Far East from CP Air's Vancouver base would become one of the cornerstones of the airline. Grant McConachie managed to secure flights to Amsterdam, Australia, Hong Kong, and Shanghai, which helped the airline's revenue grow from $3 million in 1942 to $61 million by 1964. Flights to Sydney via stops in Honolulu, Kanton Island (which was a technical stop) and Fiji as well as to Hong Kong via Tokyo (preceded by a technical stop at Shemya Island in Alaska) started in 1949, with Canadair North Star aircraft (which was a version of the DC-4); Douglas DC-4s then took over in 1951 followed by Douglas DC-6Bs in 1953. Flights to Lima, Peru started in 1953 (extended to Buenos Aires in 1956) and to Amsterdam in 1955. In August 1956 three Douglas DC-6B flights a week departed Vancouver for Amsterdam, with two flights departing for Tokyo and Hong Kong, one flight to Auckland, one flight to Sydney, and one flight to Buenos Aires.

Several of the key routes in the early days were as follows:

- Flight numbers 1 & 2, flying Hong Kong – Tokyo – Vancouver – Edmonton – Winnipeg – Toronto – Montreal
- Flights 301/302, flying Sydney – Nadi – Honolulu – Vancouver – Edmonton, and non-stop via the Polar route to Amsterdam. Other flights to Europe included Lisbon, Milan, Rome and Athens.
- Flights 401/402, flying Vancouver, Mexico City, Lima, Santiago and Buenos Aires
- Flights 501/502, Mexico City – Toronto – Santa Maria (Azores) – Lisbon – Madrid

Other routes duplicated parts of the above, but from the 1959 Intercontinental Timetable these appear to be the main routes, and show the inventiveness that Canadian Pacific Airlines needed to employ and how they developed other overseas routes for Canada. The airline was flying DC-4s and DC-6Bs internationally in the 1950s, introducing turboprop Bristol Britannia aircraft in 1958. Douglas DC-8 jetliners began to replace them from 1961, but the Britannias continued on routes that were unsuitable for the new jets well into the 1960s – for example on the route to Auckland until Whenuapai closed to civil traffic in November 1965. The Britannia was also used to fly non-stop service from Windsor, Ontario to Mexico City with this flight originating in Toronto before being replaced by a DC-8. Closer to home, non-stop Boeing 737-200 service from Vancouver to San Francisco was being flown by 1970 followed by non-stop Boeing 727-100 service from Vancouver to Los Angeles by the mid-1970s. Also during the mid-1970s, CP Air was operating stretched Douglas DC-8-63 jetliners (which the airline called the Super DC-8 "Spacemaster") on the Vancouver-Honolulu-Nandi-Sydney route twice a week. Service to New Zealand resumed in 1985 along with non-stop flights from Vancouver to Hong Kong, and in 1986 CP Air became the first North American airline with a non-stop flight between North America and Mainland China with a weekly flight to Shanghai. Flights to Beijing, Bangkok, Rio de Janeiro, and São Paulo were added in 1987.

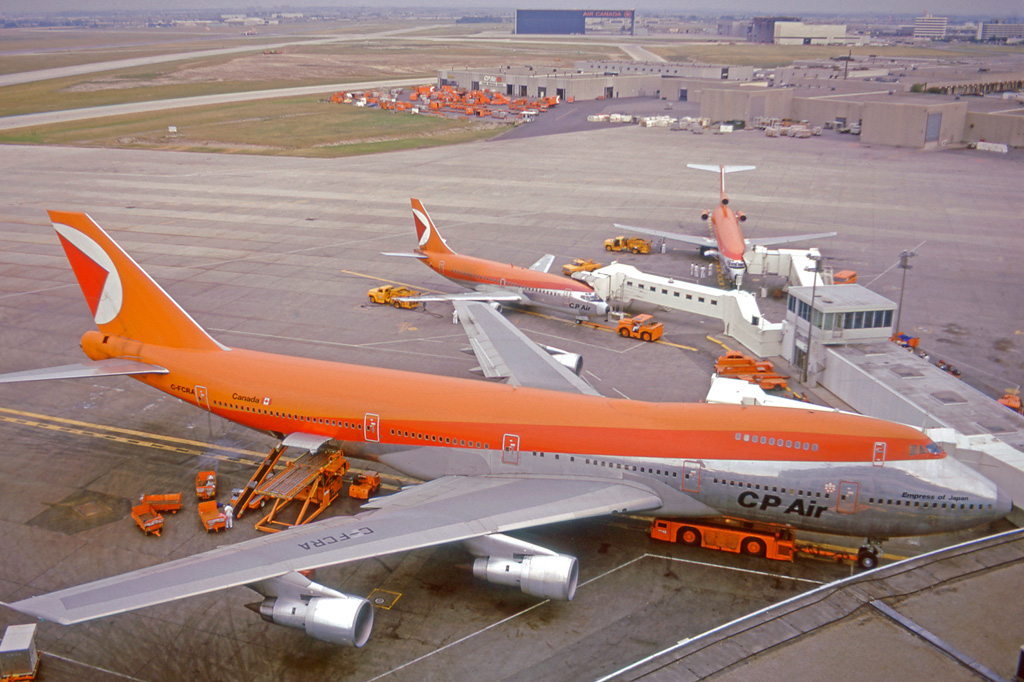
CP Air Boeing 747, Boeing 737 and Boeing 727 at Toronto International Airport in 1975

Although Canadian Pacific was not allowed scheduled routes to certain European countries, they were permitted to serve countries which Trans Canada Airlines/Air Canada did not choose to serve, so they developed schedules from 1960 onwards to Netherlands (Amsterdam), Italy (Milan and Rome), Greece (Athens), and later several other international destinations. Amsterdam was their principal European destination for these services, with direct flights to both Eastern and Western Canada, and connections were emphasized onwards to other countries. They also developed extensive charter flights (operated mainly in summertime) beginning in the mid-1960s and through the 1970s and 1980s to Britain, France, Germany and other European points which permitted them some access to these markets. Unusually for charter flights, they were listed in detail in their system timetables to show the full reach of the airline.

=== Open skies ===
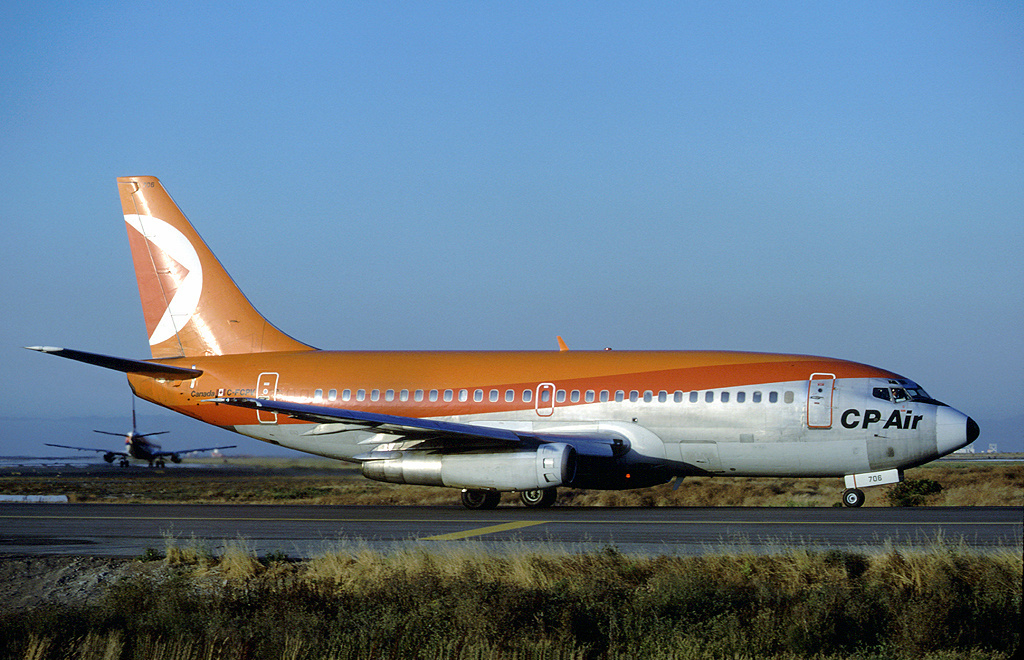
A Boeing 737-200 at San Francisco International Airport in 1983

By the late 1970s and early 1980s, many of the routes CP Air had pioneered such as Vancouver–Tokyo were now very lucrative and the previous distribution of routes was considered unfair. In 1979, the federal government eliminated the fixed market share of transcontinental flights for Air Canada (the successor to TCA). While this was a condition that was pressed by CP Air for a long time, it now scrambled to upgrade its fleet to expand on newly available routes such as new nonstop service from Vancouver to Hong Kong and Shanghai to go along with adding more flights to its then current routes like Amsterdam, Rome, Tokyo and Sydney to prepare for increased competition from Air Canada in its traditional territory. This required massive fleet renewal and an associated debt of $1 billion.

This debt load, the increased competition, and the economic downturn in Asia would all work against CP Air's future.

=== Rebranding and sale ===
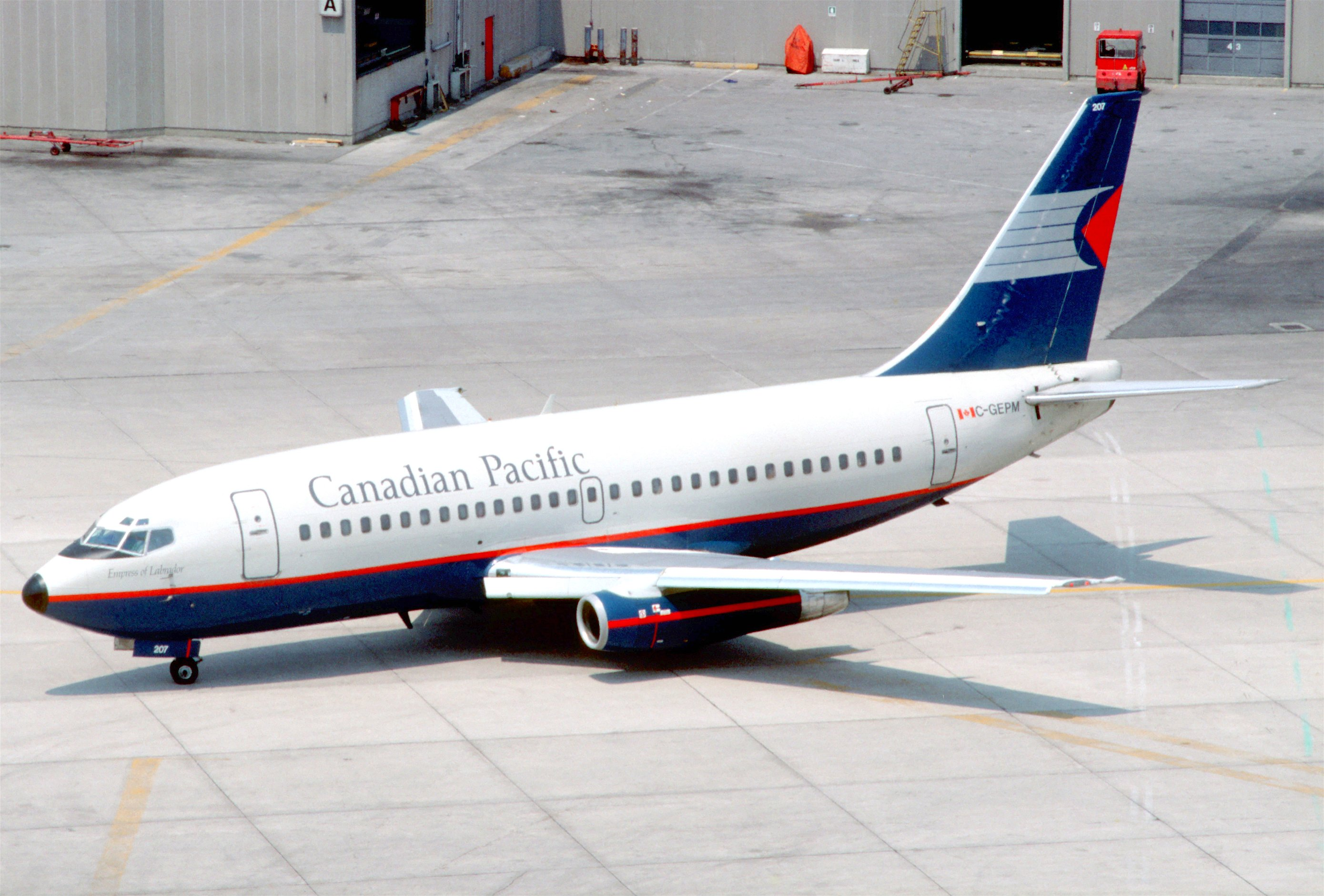
A Boeing 737-200 in the 1986 livery, later used as the basis for the Canadian Airlines livery

Having been renamed CP Air in 1968 with a new orange livery, the airline in 1986 reverted to its original name, Canadian Pacific Air Lines, with a new navy blue colour scheme and logo. This occurred shortly after the airline had taken over operations of Eastern Provincial Airways.

This new incarnation, however, was short-lived. Less than a year later, in 1987, Canadian Pacific Air Lines was sold, along with Quebec's Nordair, to Calgary-based Pacific Western Airlines (PWA) for $300 million. PWA assumed the airline's debt of $600 million. In April 1987, PWA announced that the new name of the merged airline would be Canadian Airlines International. In 2001, Canadian Airlines was taken over by and merged into Air Canada.

== Historical fleet ==
- Barkley-Grow T8P-1
- Bellanca 66-76 Aircruiser
- Boeing 707-138B (leased in 1968)
- Boeing 727-117 (1969–1974) (included Combi aircraft capable of mixed passenger/freight operations)
- Boeing 727-217 (1975–1984)
- Boeing 737-217/284 (1968–1987)
- Boeing 737-3D1 (1983-1987)
- Boeing 747-1D1 (1973–1984)
- Boeing 747-211B (1978–1984)
- Boeing 767-217ER (ordered but later cancelled)
- Bristol Britannia
- Convair CV 240 (operated on northern Canadian routes)
- Curtiss Wright C-46F Commando
- Canadair CL-4 North Star C-4-1
- de Havilland D.H.89A Dragon Rapide
- de Havilland Comet (destroyed in an accident before being placed in revenue service)
- de Havilland Canada DHC-3 Otter
- Douglas C-54
- Douglas DC-3
- Douglas DC-4
- Douglas DC-6
- Douglas DC-8-40 (1961–1980)
- Douglas DC-8-50 (1965–1966)
- Douglas DC-8-63 (1968–1983) (stretched Super DC-8 model)
- Lockheed 18 C-60A Lodestar
- McDonnell Douglas DC-10-10 (leased from United Airlines)
- McDonnell Douglas DC-10-30 (1977-1987)

List is incomplete and uses data primarily from the Boeing Sales Database.

== Accidents and incidents ==
There were 15 major incidents aboard Canadian Pacific Air Lines / CP Air aircraft.

- December 20, 1942: A Lockheed 14-H2 Super Electra crashed on Mount William Knight in the Cheam Range east of Vancouver, killing 13 persons (3 crew and 10 passengers).
- September 9, 1949: A Douglas DC-3 exploded in mid-flight en route from Quebec City to Baie-Comeau as the result of an onboard bomb, killing all 23 on board.
- February 9, 1950: a Canadair C4 overran the runway at Tokyo-Haneda Airport and plunged into Tokyo Bay. All the passengers and crew were rescued.
- December 22, 1950: (CP4) Douglas DC-3 struck a mountain in the Okanagan of British Columbia while on landing approach. 2 of 18 passengers/crew killed.
- July 21, 1951: A Douglas DC-4 departed Vancouver for Anchorage, Alaska but disappeared en route without a trace. Eventually, all 37 on board would be declared legally dead.
- March 3, 1953: De Havilland DH-106 Comet crashed on takeoff from Karachi, Pakistan while on a delivery flight. All eleven passengers/crew were killed.
- May 11, 1953: a Consolidated PBY-5A Catalina crash landed at Prince Rupert, British Columbia with 2 fatalities.
- August 29, 1956: (CP307) Douglas DC-6B crashed when it missed the landing due to pilot error near Cold Bay, Alaska. 15 of 22 passengers/crew killed.
- July 22, 1962: (CP301) Canadian Pacific Air Lines Flight 301, a Bristol Britannia 314 crashed in Honolulu, Hawaii. 27 of 40 passengers/crew were killed.
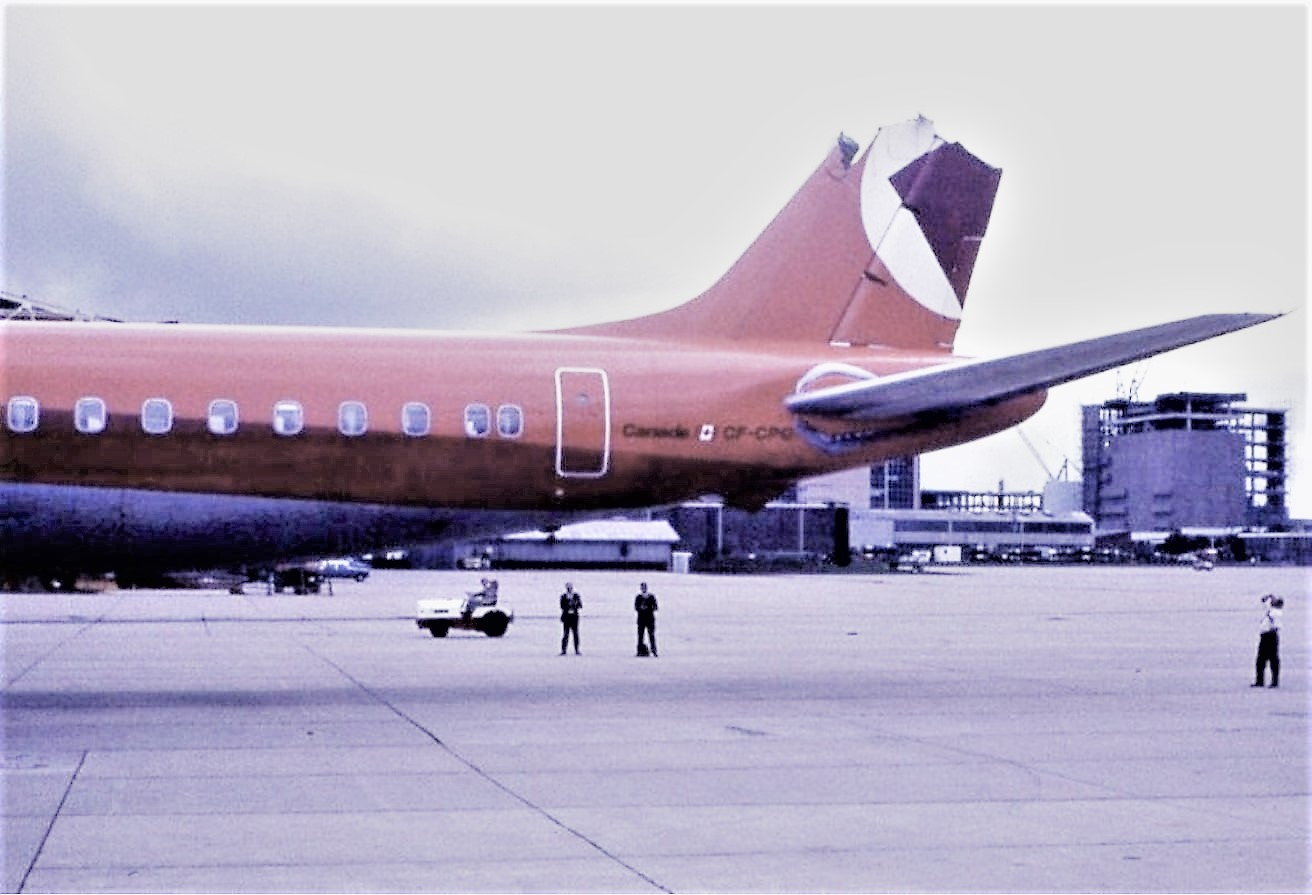
  CF-CPQ after the incident at Sydney Airport in 1971.
- July 8, 1965: Flight 21 (CP21) Douglas DC-6B crashed near Dog Creek, British Columbia when a bomb blew its tail section away. All 52 passengers/crew were killed.
- March 4, 1966: Canadian Pacific Air Lines Flight 402 (CP402) McDonnell Douglas DC-8-43 crashed on landing in Tokyo, Japan at Tokyo's Haneda Airport due to poor visibility. 64 of 72 passengers/crew were killed.
- February 7, 1968: (CP322) Boeing 707-138B leased from and operated by Standard Airways (of Seattle) crashed into aircraft and buildings at Vancouver while attempting to land in low visibility after a flight from Honolulu; 60 crew and passengers survived, but one flight attendant died, as did one person on the ground.
- January 29, 1971: a Boeing 727 of Trans Australia Airlines, registered as VH-TJA, hit the tailfin of a Canadian Pacific Air Lines Douglas DC-8 (registered CF-CPQ) right after take-off from Sydney as Flight 592 to Perth. The DC-8 had not yet cleared the runway following its arrival. The TAA 727 suffered a gash in its fuselage, but the pilots managed to safely return the aircraft to the airport, so that there were no injuries.
- November 29, 1974: (CP71) Canadian Pacific Air Lines Flight 71, a Boeing 737, was hijacked while en route from Winnipeg to Edmonton, by a man who wanted to get to Cyprus. The flight landed safely in Saskatoon, Saskatchewan, with no fatalities, though the hijacker repeatedly attacked his hostage, a flight attendant, with a dinner knife.
- June 23, 1985: (CP3, CP60) At Narita International Airport, a piece of luggage that had come from CP Air 3 exploded as it was being transferred to Air India Flight 301; the explosion killed two baggage handlers (Hideo Asano and Hideharu Koda) and injured four other people. The same kind of bomb, which CP Air staff had improperly allowed to be loaded on domestic flight CP Air 60 to Toronto and there transferred onto Air India Flight 182, exploded one hour after the Narita explosion, killing everyone onboard AI182, with the 747-200 crashing into the Atlantic Ocean southwest of Ireland.

== Aircraft on display ==
- Fairchild 82A (CF-AXL) - located at Canadian Aviation and Space Museum in Ottawa. Operated by Airline from 1942 to 1947. Restored by and donated to Museum by Canadian Pacific Air Lines in 1967.
- Douglas DC-3 (CF-CPY) - located at Yukon Transportation Museum in Whitehorse. Operated by Canadian Pacific Air Lines from 1946 to 1960.
- Douglas DC-6B (S/N 45329 CF-CZV) - located in Wallmannsthal, South Africa, still adorned with Canadian Pacific's original "Empress of Suva" name. Operated by Canadian Pacific Air Lines from 1957 to 1961.

== See also ==
- List of defunct airlines of Canada

== Bibliography ==
- Keith, R.A. (1972). Bush pilot with a brief case. Toronto (ONT.): Doubleday.
- Milberry, L. (1979). Aviation in Canada. Toronto (ONT.): McGraw-Hill Ryerson Ltd.
- Bain, D.M. (1987). Canadian Pacific Air Lines-Its history and aircraft. Calgary (ALBERTA): Kishorn Publ.
- Davies, R.E.G. (1987). Rebels and reformers of the airways. Airlife Publishing Ltd. & Smithsonian Institution Press.
