= Pacific Western Airlines =

Airline of Canada (1946–1987)

IATA	ICAO	Call sign
PW	PWA	PACIFIC WESTERN AIRLINES
- Founded: 1946; 80 years ago
- Ceased operations: March 27, 1987; 39 years ago (merged with Canadian Pacific Air Lines and Nordair to form Canadian Airlines International)
- Hubs: Calgary; Edmonton–City; Edmonton–International; Vancouver; Winnipeg
- Focus cities: Yellowknife
- Headquarters: Richmond, British Columbia (1946–1974); Calgary, Alberta (1974–1987)

Pacific Western Airlines (PWA) was an airline that operated scheduled flights throughout western Canada and charter services around the world from the 1950s through the 1980s.

In 1987, PWA purchased Canadian Pacific Air Lines, and the merged airlines became Canadian Airlines International.

== History ==
Pacific Western Airlines was a pioneer in the aviation history and known for its ability to profitably operate short haul air routes. The company raised profits and reserves and eventually formed Canadian Airlines in 1987. In 2001, Air Canada took over the aviation entities that Pacific Western Airlines had created.

Predecessor air carrier Central British Columbia Airways was started by pilots Russ Baker and Walter Gilbert with financing supplied by Karl John Springer. Springer was a successful prospector, familiar with the importance of air transportation to prospecting and mine development. The company was based in Prince George and Fort St. James, British Columbia. At incorporation July 8, 1945, Frank Cooke and Lawrence Dickinson were recorded as President and Secretary-Treasurer as the pilots continued with Canadian Pacific Air Lines before CBCA went into operation. Baker's wife Madge paid the lawyer's fees for incorporation. After Baker had secured a contract with BC Forest Service to patrol for forest fires, Springer advanced $150,000 at 6% interest, secured by aircraft and other CBCA property.

Pilots provided air service to remote mining camps and logging operations in the North, delivering men and materials to isolated destinations.

It was in 1949 that Central B.C. Airways was commissioned to do aerial surveys for the giant aluminium and power complexes at Kitimat and Kemano in the rugged mountainous backcountry of British Columbia. During the development of this project, Central B.C. Airways handled 95% of the air support, consisting mainly of heavy industrial freight and workers.

Between 1949 and 1952, the company acquired seven other smaller flying services. With each acquisition, the company expanded its base of operations, providing the much needed manpower and equipment necessary to maintain a rapidly expanding air service. These companies included Associated Air Taxi, Associated Airways, Kamloops Air Service, Skeena Air Transport, Whitehorse Flying Services and Port Alberni Airways.

=== 1950s to 1970s ===
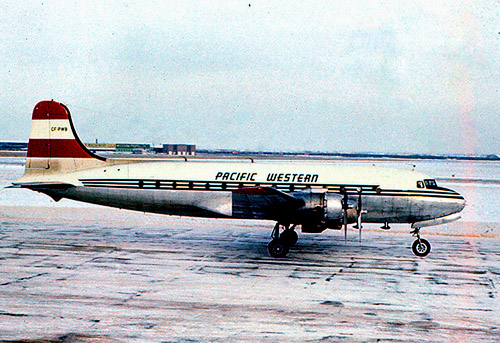
Pacific Western Airlines DC-4 at Edmonton City Centre Airport

In 1953, the company adopted the name Pacific Western Airlines. Additional companies were acquired, such as Queen Charlotte Airlines in 1955, giving the company a foothold in scheduled services, and Associated Airways in 1955, leading to a vital contract in the construction of the Distant Early Warning Line in Canada's north.

In 1958, Russ Baker died. In 1959, Pacific Western was part of the largest single transfer of scheduled services in Canadian aviation history. In that year, Canadian Pacific Air Lines released licensed routes from Edmonton to 18 points in Northern Alberta and the Northwest Territories. With this transfer, in addition to its existing routes, Pacific Western was licensed to provide scheduled air services over approximately 7,000 miles throughout Western and Northern Canada.

At this point in time, the company acquired a reputation for innovation and aggressiveness by developing several unique services for freight customers and passengers.

The Calgary-Edmonton Chieftain Airbus shuttle service was inaugurated in 1963, with passengers carrying their luggage to the aircraft and depositing it on the ramp for loading. A ticket agent on board a 66-seat Douglas DC-4 propliner would then collect the fare during the 55-minute flight. The airline operated the service from the close-in Edmonton City Centre Airport (YXD, formerly Edmonton Industrial Airport).

When the "Chieftain Airbus" service first started, it was estimated that it would take ten years to move one million passengers. That goal was reached in less than eight years.

1964 marked the introduction of another unique service known as Inclusive Tour Charter programs. This was another first for Canada, with excursion flights from Vancouver to Grand Cayman Islands. Later in the same year, Pacific Western pioneered group charters across the Atlantic, mainly to the United Kingdom.

In 1966, in anticipation of a regional air policy for Canada, Pacific Western began placing orders for jet and turboprop equipment. The regional policy became a reality in 1968, and the company was able to add many more ports of call to the already long list of destinations in Western Canada. Services at this point stretched from the U.S.Pacific Northwest to the Arctic Archipelago.

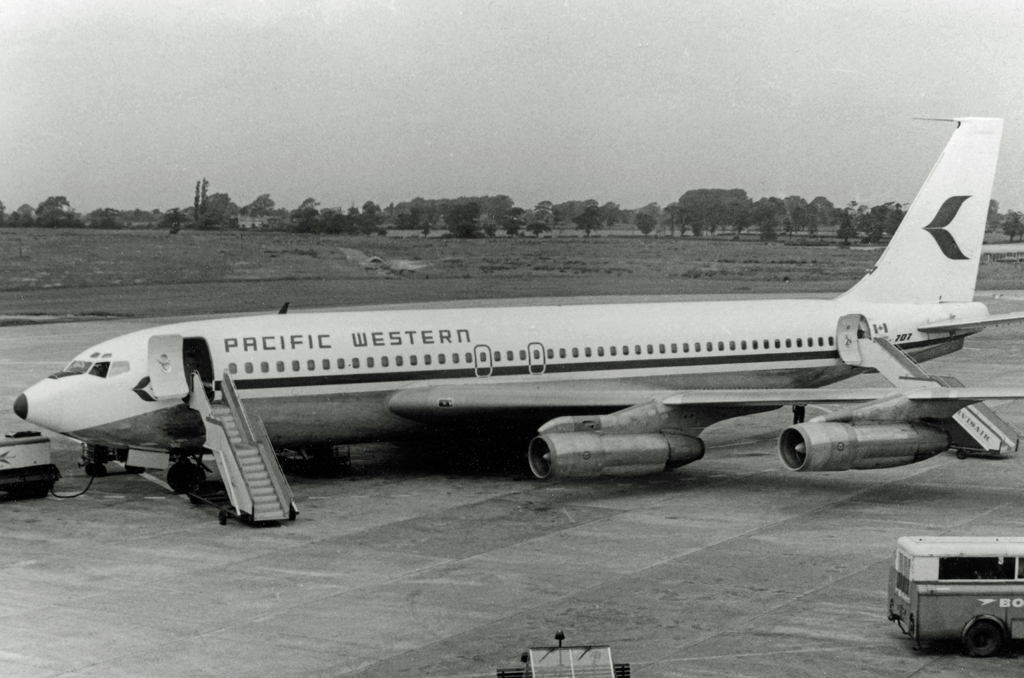
PWA Boeing 707-138B at Manchester Airport in 1969

Boeing 707s were added to the fleet in 1967, and Inclusive Tour programs were introduced to Mexico and Hawaii in the winter, with several European destinations served during the summer, all on a charter basis. The addition of a cargo model Boeing 707 meant that livestock and perishables could now be carried all over the world, and the name Pacific Western became synonymous with "World Air Cargo". The company aircraft visited more than 90 countries during this period of time.

Pacific Western operated a worldwide Boeing 707 cargo and passenger charter program until the last aircraft was sold in 1979.

In 1967, Pacific Western became the first commercial operator of the Lockheed L-100 Hercules turboprop freighter. The Hercules were acquired to support Canada's extensive search for energy and minerals in Northern Canada. Then, following the Spring ice break-up, the Hercules would rejoin the main cargo fleet in worldwide operations. Diverse cargoes included 21,000 kilos of dimes, 20,000 kilos of Christmas cake, and a shipment of electronic equipment to the People's Republic of China, the first commercial air shipment to that country. In November 1968, the company introduced jet service on its scheduled route system with the delivery of its first Boeing 737-200 jetliner. Pacific Western was the first Canadian carrier to order the 737. The "Stampeder Service" linking Alberta and B.C. began on December 17, 1968.

Another transfer of licensing authority from CP Air to Pacific Western provided the company with routes throughout the Interior of B.C. in 1969. The acquisition and control of B.C. Air Lines in September 1970 enabled the company to supply expanded air service to routes in the B.C. Interior and on the coast. PWA then began operating small Nord 262 turboprop aircraft that had been previously flown by B.C. Air Lines.

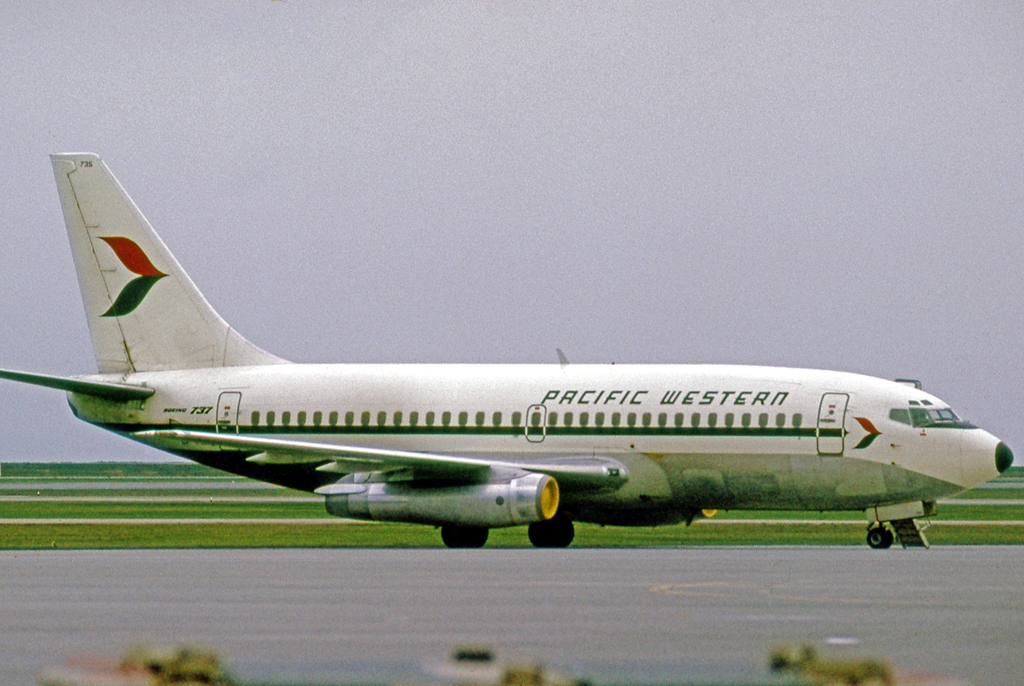
Pacific Western Boeing 737-200 at Vancouver International Airport in 1973

With larger equipment such as the Douglas DC-4, Douglas DC-6, Convair 640, Lockheed L-188 Electra, Boeing 727-100C and Boeing 737-200, Pacific Western provided scheduled air service throughout B.C., Alberta and the Northwest Territories. By 1969, the "Chieftain Airbus" shuttle service between Calgary and Edmonton was being flown with Boeing 737-200 jets, Convair 640 turboprops and Douglas DC-6 propliners.

As the 1970s progressed, the airline's equipment varied and the company began a fleet rationalization program, concentrating on the 117-seat Boeing 737-200 as the backbone of the mainline fleet. During the mid 1970s, Pacific Western was operating Boeing 727-100Cs in addition to its Boeing 737-200 and -200C aircraft. By the late 1970s, the company operated an all-jet mainline fleet.

=== Government of Alberta ownership ===
In 1974, the Government of Alberta under Progressive Conservative Premier Peter Lougheed assumed ownership of Pacific Western Airlines to assure the development of the North and Western Canada. The province purchased the airline for $37.5 million (equivalent to $235,000,000 in 2025) during a secret takeover bid. The Alberta government moved quickly out of worries British Columbia Premier Dave Barrett had a similar plan.

Following the acquisition, PWA's headquarters moved from Vancouver International Airport in Richmond, British Columbia, moved to Calgary, Alberta. Calgary International Airport became the airline's new hub.

In 1983 the Lougheed government sold the airline for $37.7 million after promising to do so during the 1982 Alberta general election.

In 1976, Pacific Western was continuing to operate its "Chieftain Airbus" shuttle service between Calgary (YYC) and the Edmonton City Centre Airport (YXD, formerly the Edmonton Industrial Airport) with up to fourteen round trip flights a day operated with Boeing 737-200 jetliners.

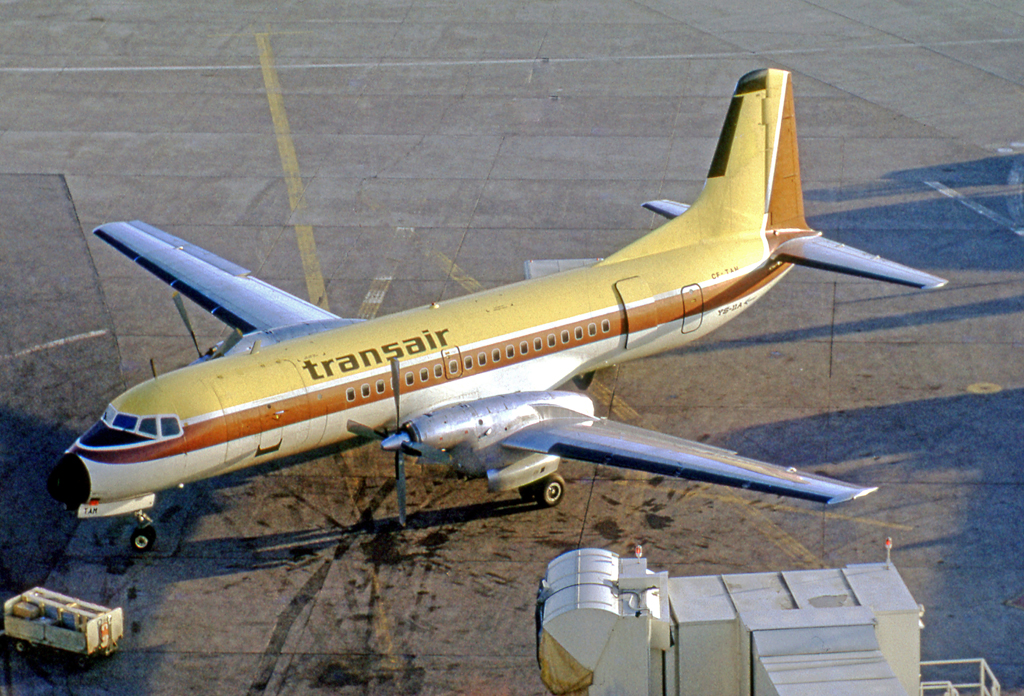
Twin-turboprop NAMC YS-11A was operated by Transair along regional routes

In 1978, the company acquired the regional carrier Transair of Winnipeg which included that airline's Boeing 737-200 jets. In February 1979, in an agreement with the Canadian Transport Commission, Transair ceased all scheduled operations east of Winnipeg and Calgary/Edmonton via Regina and Saskatoon, Saskatchewan. This linked the Pacific Western/Transair systems, completing the first step to eventual merger. On December 1, 1979, all operating licences and routes were transferred to Pacific Western Airlines and Transair ceased as a regional carrier.

Like Pacific Western, Transair comprised several companies. Its history dated back to 1947 with the founding of Central Northern Airways. In 1956, Central Northern Airways and Arctic Wings merged under the name Transair. The most significant of various amalgamations during the years took place in 1969 when Transair and Midwest Airlines combined their operations to form a diversified regional carrier serving midwest prairie Canada to Toronto and the Arctic with the Transair fleet including Boeing 737-200 and Fokker F28 jets for scheduled services and the Boeing 707 for charter flights.

=== 1985 labour disputes ===
On November 20, 1985, labour disputes began between the International Union, the United Automobile, Aerospace and Agricultural Implement Workers of America, the International Association of Machinists and the Canadian Air Line Flight Attendants' Association against Pacific Western. Between 90 and 125 picketers paraded for two hours through the terminal in December.

The unions appealed from the judgment of the honourable Mr. Justice Dixon on December 24, 1985, in which he granted an interim injunction restraining from various picketing activities and limiting the number of pickets permitted at one time at various locations.

Dixon, J. gave oral reasons for judgment stating that, despite the stated purpose of the picketing, improper and lawful activities had occurred during the course of it. He said:

"I am persuaded on the evidence before me that the interest of the travelling public and the business interest of the applicant have been compromised by the picketing activities of the respondents and that such activities have exceeded the bounds of that which is proper and lawful, such that limited picketing only is to be permitted."

The labour dispute lasted until April 1986.

=== 1980s and merger ===
By 1986 Pacific Western was the largest airline in Western Canada, carrying over 3 million passengers per year. In 1986, joint marketing agreements were signed with local service carriers: Calm Air of Thompson, Manitoba and Time Air of Lethbridge, Alberta, under the Pacific Western Spirit Program. Pacific Western employed nearly 3,000 people throughout Western Canada and Ontario.

Organizational changes in 1986 established a formal structural relationship between the holding company, Pacific Western Airlines Corporation, and the airline operating company, Pacific Western Airlines Limited.

On December 2, 1986, PWA Corporation announced its intention to purchase Canadian Pacific Air Lines for $300 million, effective February 1, 1987.

The airline went through several iterations, originally consisting of small float planes in the 1950s, evolving to include a varied fleet of Convair 640 turboprops and Douglas propliners including DC-3, DC-4, DC-6 and DC-7C into the 1960s. PWA had a major impact in the Arctic and was instrumental in providing service to many isolated communities. The airline also operated several Boeing 707 aircraft that served in both a passenger and cargo capacity for charter work. Along with a number of Lockheed L-100 (the civilian version of the C-130 Hercules), PWA became a major player in the world air cargo business (also used extensively to support oil exploration in the High Arctic). The airline expanded to include a variety of aircraft, including Boeing 727-100s, Boeing 737-200s and two Boeing 767-200 aircraft. The airline was briefly owned by the Alberta provincial government in the mid 1970s. According to the July 1, 1983, edition of the Official Airline Guide (OAG), the airline was operating its Boeing 767 aircraft on scheduled services into Vancouver, Calgary, Regina and Winnipeg. By early 1985, the OAG listed 767 service being flown on a weekday roundtrip routing of Seattle (SEA) - Vancouver (YVR) - Calgary (YYC) - Saskatoon (YXE) - Winnipeg (YWG). The 767s were the largest aircraft ever operated in scheduled passenger service by PWA. However, they were then removed from the fleet in favour of the smaller Boeing 737.

Following the removal of the Boeing 767 aircraft during the mid 1980s, the fleet then exclusively consisted of Boeing 737-200 and 737-200C jetliners. Pacific Western had become one of the most innovative airlines on the west coast of Canada, servicing communities throughout western Canada and across the country.

In 1987, PWA Corp, the parent corporation of Pacific Western Airlines, purchased Canadian Pacific Air Lines (which formerly operated as CP Air but had changed its name back to Canadian Pacific) to form Canadian Airlines International. Wardair, another Canadian airline, was later purchased by PWA in 1989, resulting in only two major airlines in Canada: Canadian Airlines International and Air Canada. PWA and later Canadian airlines were based in Calgary. In December 1999, Air Canada took over Canadian Airlines International.

== Destinations in 1985 ==
According to the April 28, 1985, Pacific Western system route map, the airline was operating scheduled passenger service to the following destinations in Canada and the U.S. Pacific Western had recently removed its Boeing 767-200 aircraft from the fleet by this time and was operating all flights with Boeing 737-200 jetliners:

- Brandon
- Calgary (Note: Hub and airline headquarters)
- Cambridge Bay
- Campbell River
- Castlegar
- Comox
- Churchill
- Cranbrook
- Dawson Creek
- Edmonton (Note: Hub (the airline served both the Edmonton City Centre Airport and the Edmonton International Airport))
- Flin Flon
- Fort McMurray
- Fort Simpson
- Fort Smith
- Gillam
- Hay River
- Inuvik
- Kamloops
- Kelowna
- Lynn Lake
- Norman Wells
- Penticton
- Port Hardy
- Prince George
- Quesnel
- Regina
- Resolute
- Sandspit
- Saskatoon
- Seattle (Note: Only U.S. destination)
- Smithers
- Terrace
- The Pas
- Thompson
- Thunder Bay
- Toronto
- Vancouver (Note: Hub)
- Victoria
- Whitehorse
- Williams Lake
- Winnipeg (Note: Hub)
- Yellowknife (Note: Focus city)

== Fleet ==
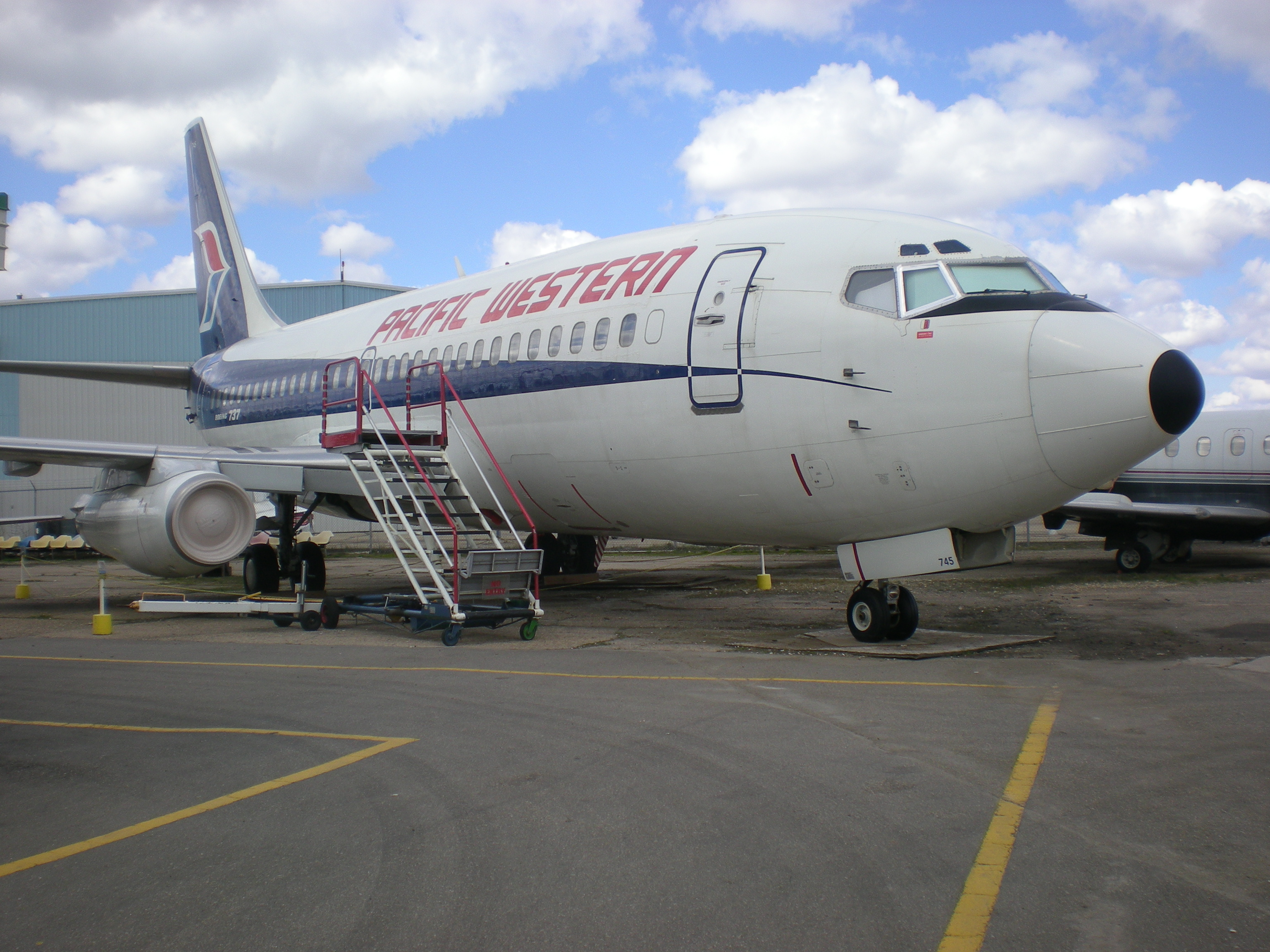
PWA Boeing 737-200 at the Alberta Aviation Museum

- Avro Anson (Aircraft spotted on 1962 film from Granduc mine airstrip British Columbia Canada)
- Avro York
- Boeing 707-138B
- Boeing 707-321C
- Boeing 707-351C
- Boeing 727-100
- Boeing 727-092C
- Boeing 727-171C (B727-100 aircraft included Combi aircraft capable of mixed passenger/freight operations)
- Boeing 727-200
- Boeing 737-200
- Boeing 737-275
- Boeing 737-275A
- Boeing 737-275C
- Boeing 737-2T7A
- Boeing 737-2T7
- Boeing 737-2A9C (B737-200 aircraft included Combi aircraft capable of mixed passenger/freight operations)
- Boeing 737-3Y0 (B737-300 model leased from Monarch Airlines)
- Boeing 767-275ER
- Convair 640
- Curtiss C-46
- De Havilland Canada DHC-2 Beaver
- De Havilland Canada DHC-3 Otter
- De Havilland Canada DHC-6 Twin Otter
- Douglas DC-3
- Douglas DC-4
- Douglas DC-6/DC-6B
- Douglas DC-7C
- Grumman G-73 Mallard (amphibious aircraft)
- Lockheed L-100 Hercules
- Lockheed L-188 Electra
- Noorduyn Norseman (amphibious aircraft)
- Nord 262
- Junkers W 34

== Photo gallery ==
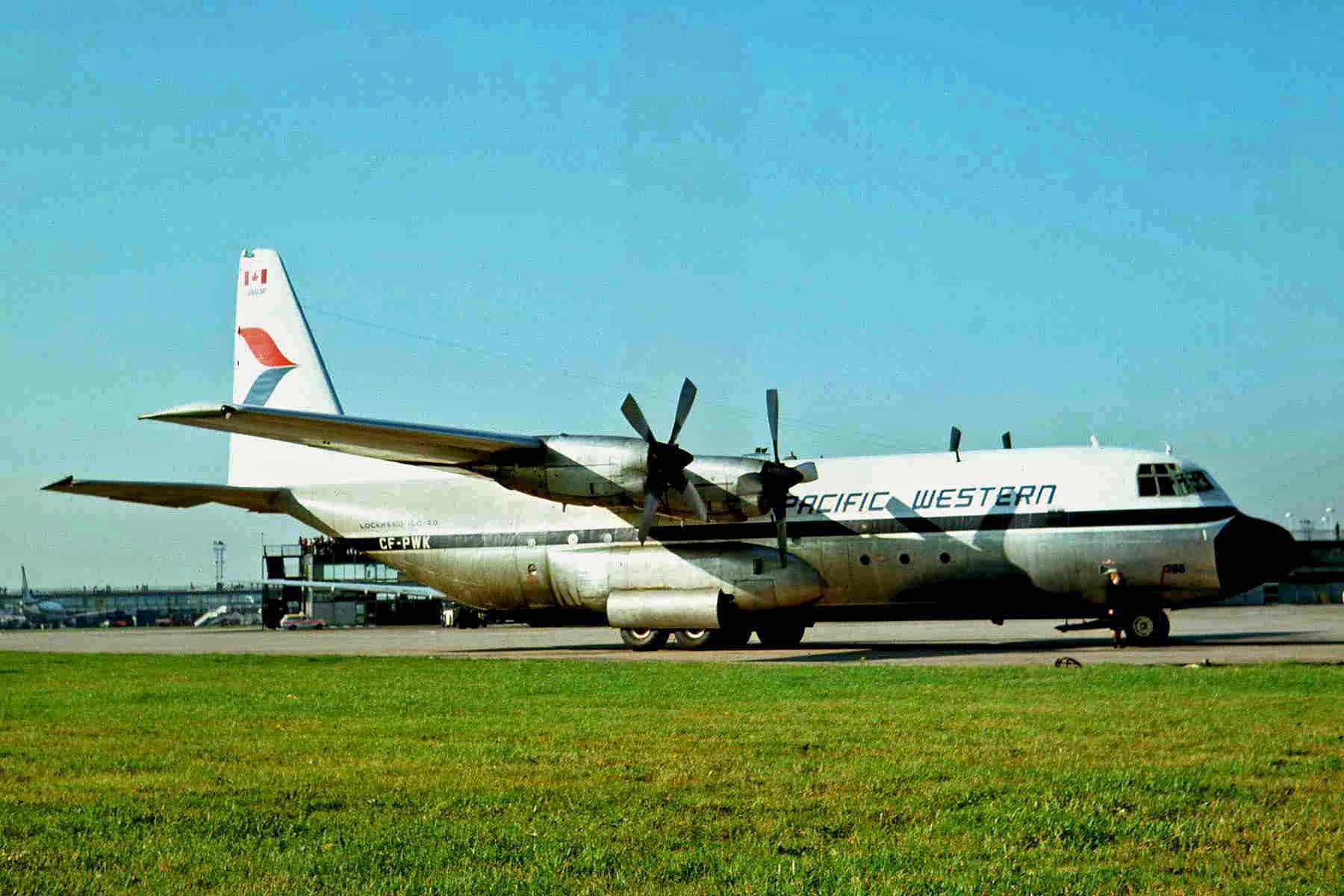
Lockheed L.100-20

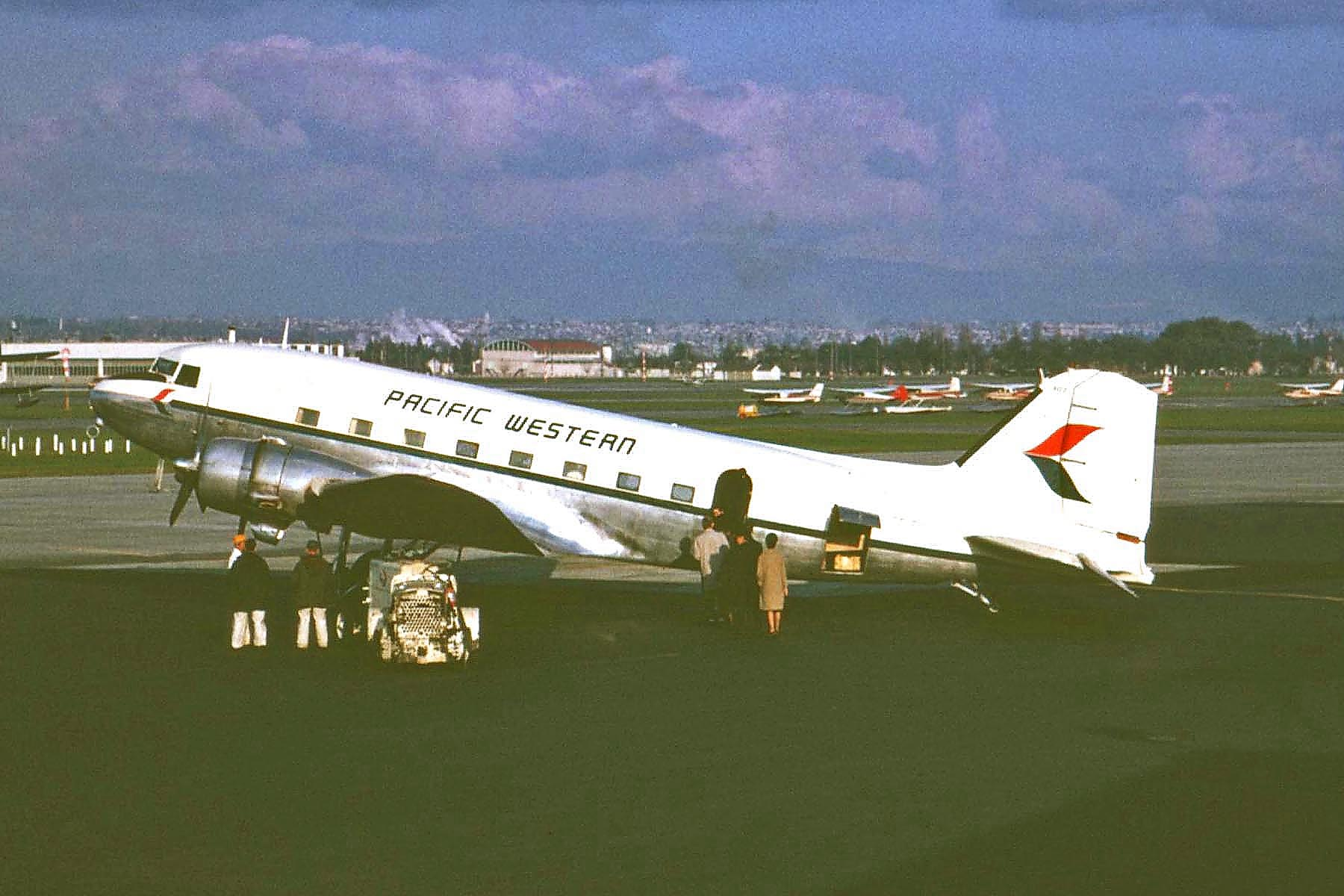
Douglas DC 3 in its last livery

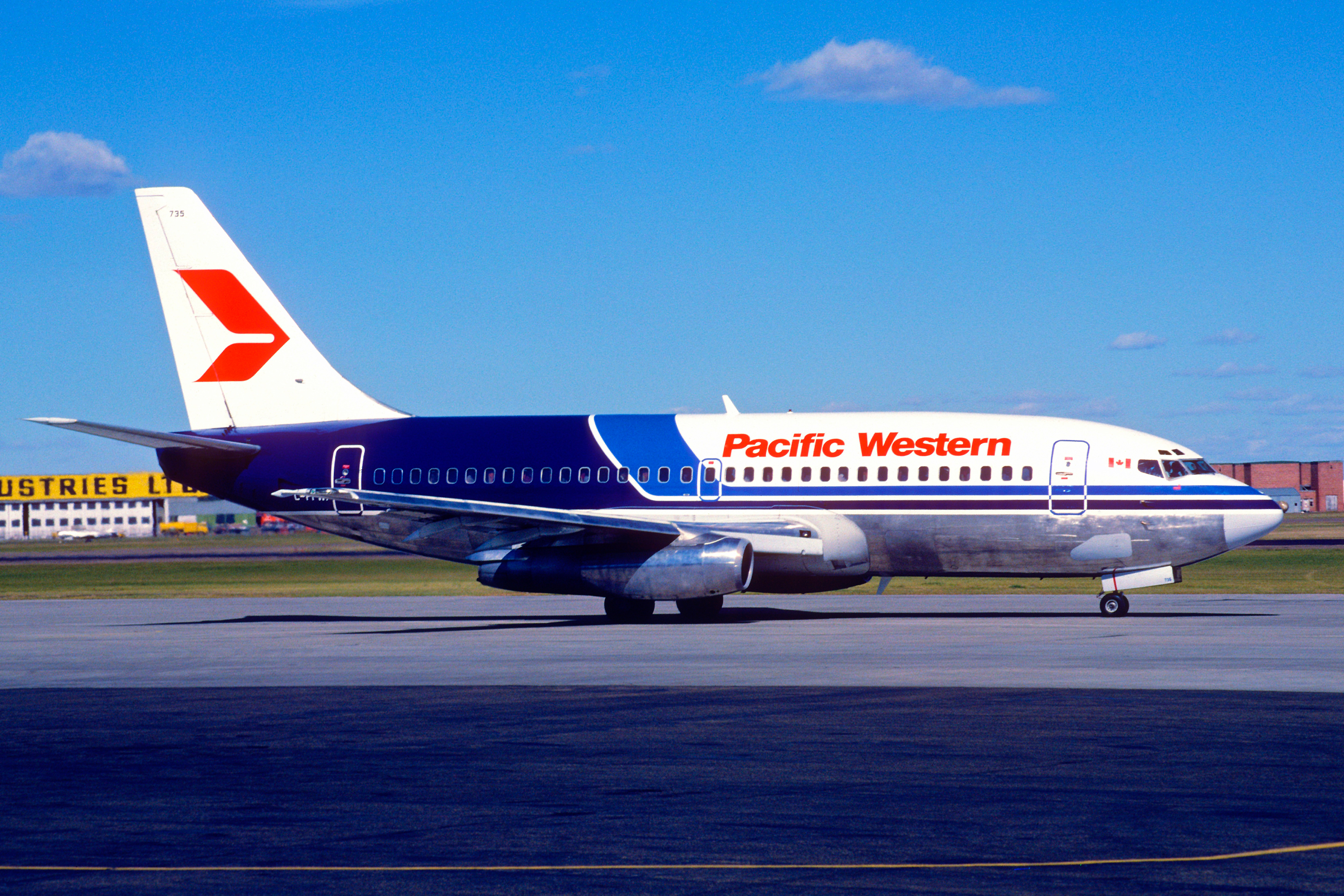
Boeing 737 model 200 in mid-term livery

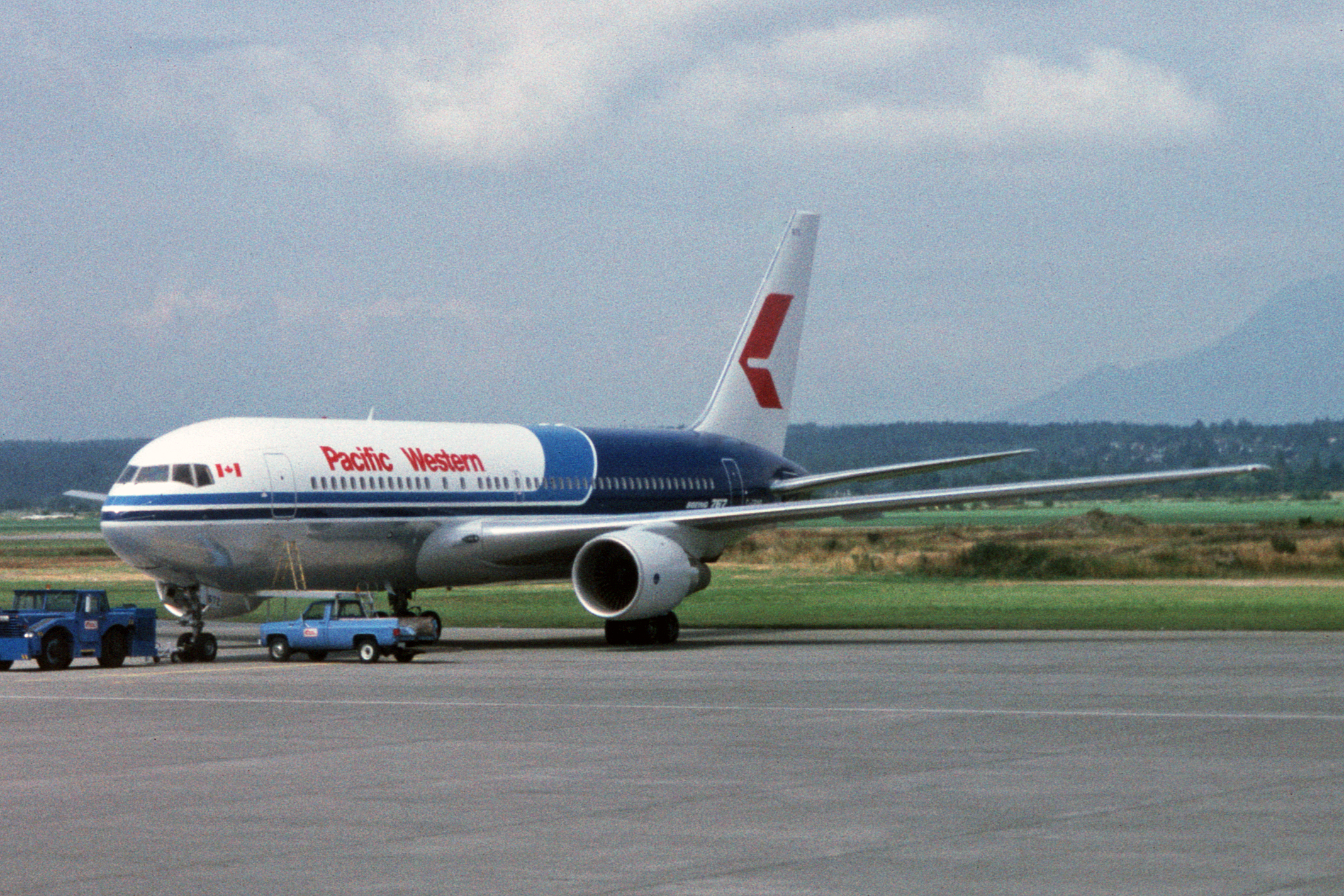
Boeing 767 model 200

== Incidents and accidents ==
- June 23, 1957: A Pacific Western Airlines Douglas DC-3, registered CF-EPI, encountered control issues shortly after takeoff from Port Hardy, British Columbia. While making an emergency landing the aircraft stalled, hit the runway, bounced back into the air, stalled again and dived into the ground beside the runway. 2 of the 3 crew and 12 of the 15 passengers were killed. The cause of the accident was due to elevator control locks not being removed prior to takeoff.
- January 29, 1960: Pacific Western Airlines Flight 104, a Curtiss C-46 Commando, overran the runway at Port Hardy, British Columbia after returning due to issues with the no.2 engine. None of the 51 occupants were injured but the aircraft was written off.
- March 10, 1966: A Pacific Western Airlines Grumman G-21 Goose, registered CF-MSK, crashed while making an emergency descent in poor weather near Reef Island, Alaska. The pilot survived but all 6 passengers were killed.
- July 16, 1969: Dean Maclagan, a pilot, crashed a Lockheed L-100 Hercules freighter into the Peruvian jungle with the wing hitting ground during go-around in fog.
- September 17, 1969: Pacific Western Airlines Flight 627, a Convair CV-640, crashed into a cloud-enshrouded hillside while on approach to Campbell River, British Columbia at night. Two of the four crew and 1 of the 10 passengers died. The cause was due to the pilots non-compliance with the approved instrument approach procedure at the airport.
- January 2, 1973: The first of the Boeing 707-321C freighters, Flight 3801, a Boeing 707-321 (CF-PWZ) crashed at Telford Lake, Canada during a blizzard near Edmonton; five crew and the cargo of 86 cattle died, the cause was determined to be pilot error.
- November 21, 1976: Dean Maclagan died with four of his crew in another Lockheed L-100 Hercules freighter crash at Eastville, near Kisangani, Zaire, due to low fuel and an emergency landing in fog at night. Circumstances concerning the accident included airfield landing lights off on arrival, not enough fuel to return, and an approach and let down in the jungle. There was one survivor.
- On 14 January 1977: a de Havilland Canada DHC-6 Twin Otter operated by Northern Thunderbird Air, flying as Pacific Western Airlines Flight 405, crashed into a mountain during its approach to runway 32 at Northwest Regional Airport Terrace-Kitimat, Canada in a snowstorm, killing all 9 passengers and 3 crew on board. Weather conditions, including limited visibility and heavy snowfall, were significant factors contributing to the accident.
- February 11, 1978: Pacific Western Airlines Flight 314, a Boeing 737-200; Cranbrook Airport, Canada: The aircraft crashed after thrust reversers did not fully stow following a rejected landing that was executed in order to avoid a snowsweeper. In the crash, four of the crew and 38 of the 44 passengers died.
- March 22, 1984: Pacific Western Airlines Flight 501 was a regularly scheduled flight that flew between Calgary, Alberta, and Edmonton, Alberta, Canada. The Boeing 737-200 aircraft caught fire during takeoff on March 22, 1984. No one died and 27 people were injured, five seriously. The plane burned to the ground as fire crews attempted to extinguish the fire.
- July 14, 1986: Pacific Western Airlines Flight 117, a Boeing 737-200 flying from Calgary International Airport to Vancouver International Airport with a stop in Kelowna, left the runway while landing in Kelowna and came to rest approximately 1,300 feet beyond the end of the runway. No fatalities or serious injuries were reported, however, 5 crew members and 76 passengers suffered minor injuries.

== See also ==
- History of aviation in Canada
- List of defunct airlines of Canada
