= Bush flying =

Piloting small aircraft in remote areas

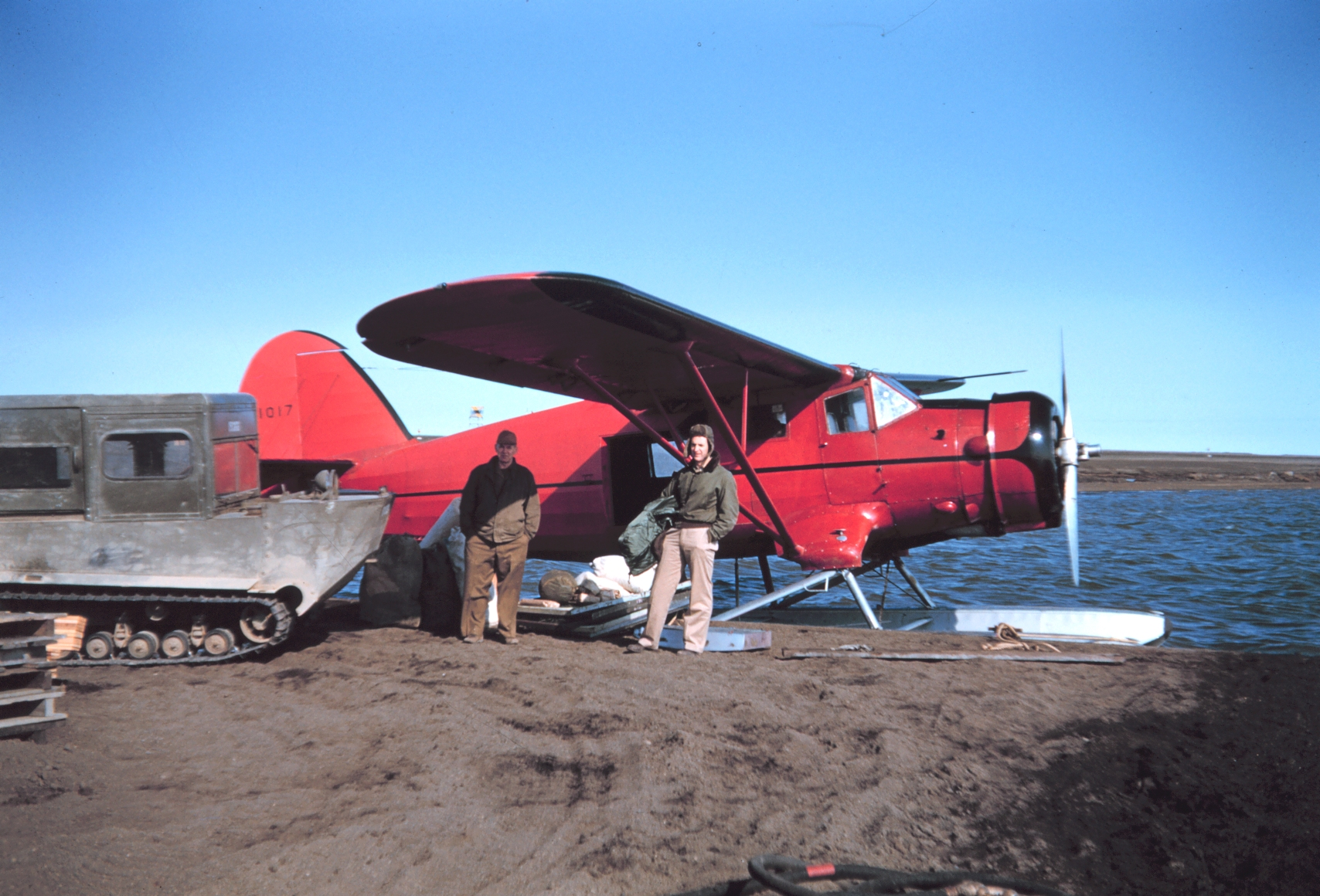
Noorduyn Norseman float plane in Alaska, 1950

Bush flying refers to aircraft operations carried out in the bush. Bush flying involves operations in rough terrain where there are often no prepared landing strips or runways, frequently necessitating that bush planes be equipped with abnormally large tires, skis, skids or any other equipment necessary for unpaved runway operation. It is the only viable way of delivering people and supplies into more difficult to reach, remote locations.

== Etymology ==
This term bush has been used since the 19th century to describe remote wilderness area beyond clearings and settlements hence bush flying denotes flight operations carried out in such remote regions. In Australia, in particular, bush refers to areas that might be called forest or wilderness in other countries.

== Purpose ==
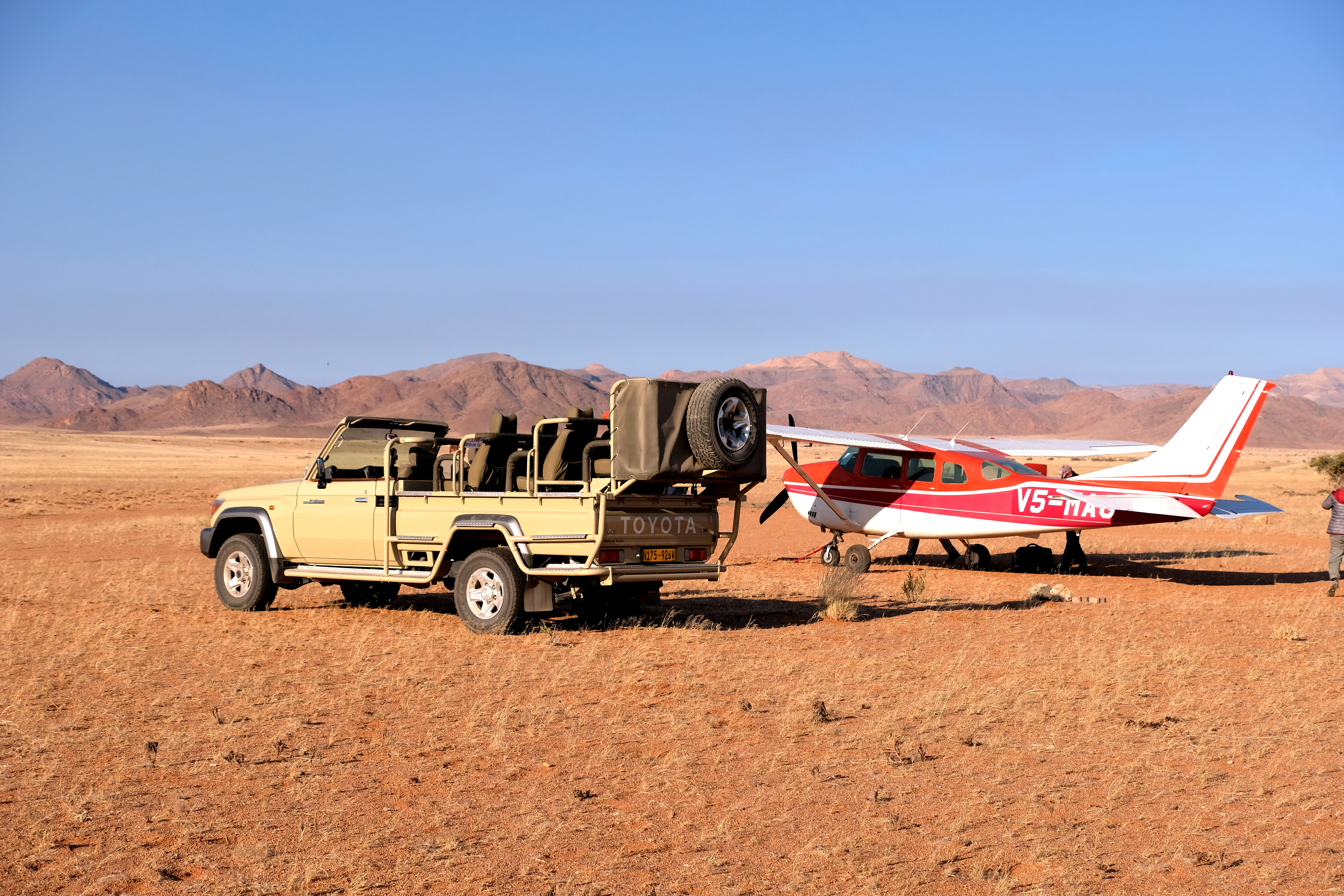
Preparations for take off in the Namib Desert (2018)

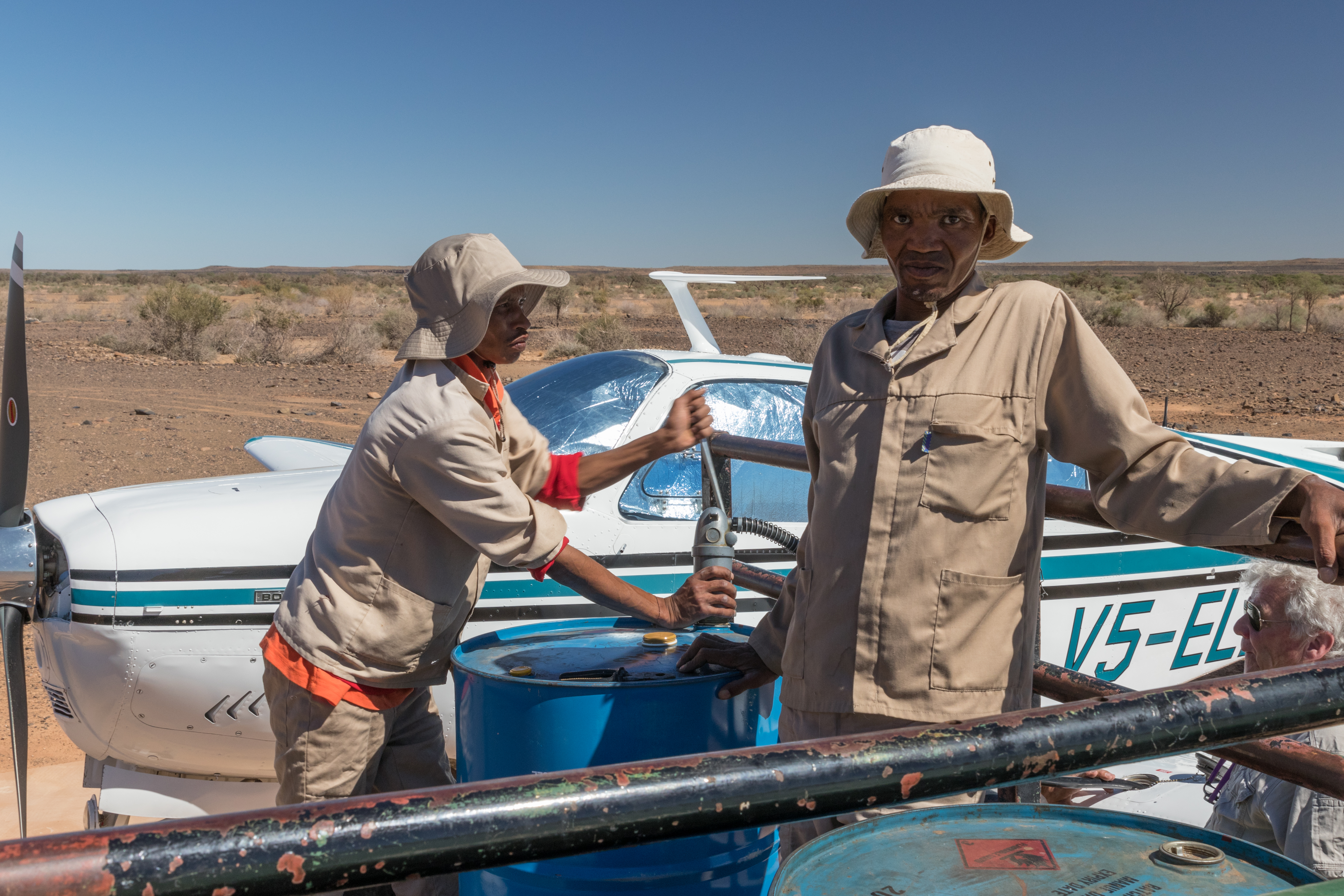
Refuelling an aircraft in the field at Simplon, Namibia (2018)

Bush flying is the primary and sometimes the only method of access across Northern Canada, Western Canada, Alaska, the Australian Outback and many other parts of the world.

== History ==
In Canada, the first real use of bush flying was for exploration and development, while in Alaska, transportation was the main purpose. Later, bush flying became important during rescue operations. Bush pilots are needed in rescue operations and are important for many different reasons.

=== Canada ===
After the 1918 Armistice with Germany, Ellwood Wilson, a Canadian forester employed by the Laurentide Company in Quebec, realized that airplanes could be used to spot forest fires and to map forested areas. In early 1919, after Wilson discovered that the U.S. Navy was giving Canada several war-surplus Curtiss HS-2L flying boats, he asked to borrow two. He then hired Captain Stuart Graham to fly the planes. Graham and his engineer, Walter Kahre, then flew the first HS-2L to Lac-à-la-Tortue on 4 June 1919, arriving on 8 June 1919. The flight had covered 645 miles, the longest cross-country flight executed in Canada at the time. He then delivered the other HS-2L to Lac-à-la-Tortue.

Equipped with the aircraft, the first bush flights occurred when fire patrol and aerial photography began in the summer of 1919 in the St. Maurice River valley. Graham and Kahre continued this service for two more seasons, but it became so expensive that the Laurentide Company underwrote the operation. In response, it was split into a separate company called Laurentide Air Services Ltd. with Wilson as president and former Royal Naval Air Service instructor and barnstormer William Roy Maxwell as vice president. These were the first bush flights in Eastern Canada.

In Western Canada, after Wilfrid May was discharged from the Royal Naval Air Service and moved to Edmonton, a Montreal businessman offered the city of Edmonton a Curtiss JN-4 after he found success in the city's real estate. Mayor Joe Clarke and city council accepted the gift, prompting May to ask to rent the plane. City council and May agreed to a price of CA$25. May and his brother Court May completed the necessary paperwork and raised the required capital to form May Airplanes Ltd. George Gorman, a pilot, and Peter Derbyshire, a mechanic, joined the first commercial bush operations in Canada.

May then asked the publisher of the Edmonton Journal to fly copies of the paper to Wetaskiwin, 70 kilometres (43 mi) south of Edmonton. He accepted and the next day, Gorman and Derbyshire flew the newspapers along with 2 sacks of advertising circulars, following the rail line to the city, announcing the service to communities along the way.

Bush flying in Canada is commemorated by the Canadian Bushplane Heritage Centre in Sault Ste Marie, Ontario as well as two National Film Board of Canada documentary films, Bush Pilot: Reflections on a Canadian Myth (1980) and Bush Pilot - Into the Wild Blue Yonder (2000).

=== Alaska ===
Alaska's first bush pilot was Carl Ben Eielson, a North Dakota farm boy of Scandinavian descent who flew during World War I. After the war, he moved to Alaska as a mathematics and science teacher in Fairbanks. However, he soon persuaded several citizens to help him acquire a Curtiss JN-4, flying passengers to nearby settlements. He then asked the postal operator for an airmail contract. The post office accepted the proposal and in 1924, Eielson received a de Havilland 4 that would be used to make eight mail runs to McGrath, 280 miles (450 km) away, before his contract was terminated after the third accident.

Noel Wien made the first successful bush flight to Livengood, Alaska on 19 Aug. 1924. This flight demonstrated that the trip in support of mining operations could be made in under an hour, when the dog sled trail would take several days in winter. Wien made 34 flights that first summer in support of the approximately 250 men located at the camp, providing supplies and services.

A woman by the name of Celia M. Hunter became one of the first to serve as a flight attendant for flights to both Nome, and Kotzebue in the year 1947. These were the first tourist trips to be accomplished by flying in the Alaskan bush.

== Aircraft used ==
Bush flying involves operations in rough terrain, necessitating bush planes to be equipped with tundra tires, floats, or skis. A bush plane should have good short take-off and landing capabilities. A typical bush plane will usually have high mounted wings on top of its fuselage to ensure adequate ground clearance from obstacles. They will normally have conventional "tail-dragger" landing gear as they offer lower drag and weight than tricycle landing gear, and is more suited to rough surfaces. The greater upward angle of the taildragger configuration gives the propeller more ground clearance allowing it to avoid striking the ground, which would cause damage. Most types can be equipped with wheels, skis or floats, to operate from dry ground, snow, ice and protected waterways. Some commonly seen bushplanes include:

- The Grumman G-21 Goose amphibian, whose combination of both a flying boat hull and wheeled undercarriage endowed it with considerable versatility.
- The De Havilland Canada DHC-2 Beaver designed and built in Canada in 1946 is widely used throughout Canada and Alaska.
- The De Havilland Canada DHC-3 Otter (also from Canada) was widely used throughout the Canadian and Alaskan bush. The aircraft which began its service in 1952 was supplemented by a later twin engine version, the Twin Otter that remains in widespread service.
- The Cessna 185 Skywagon is a popular light aircraft widely used in the bush.
- The Noorduyn Norseman served intensely as a bush plane in its native Canada, and with the US military, equipped either with ski or floats or fixed-wheel landing gear
- The Piper PA-18 Super Cub is a two-seat airplane developed in 1949 and is fitted with a variety of engines of different sizes. The aircraft is capable of carrying a single passenger.
- The Quest Kodiak is a high-wing, unpressurized, single-engined turboprop with fixed tricycle landing gear. Developed in 1999, passenger seats are track-mounted and removable, it has access doors for the pilots and the aft clamshell door, with automatic steps, allows cargo loading or eight passengers boarding. and is suitable for STOL operations from unimproved airfields.

== Bush flying today ==
In the 21st century bush flying has expanded beyond its roots as a means of rural transportation, exploration of uncharted terrain, and resource movement. There is now a new age of bush pilots who see flying as a means of community, competition, and enjoyment. The original parameters of bush flying are now continued by pilots of the current era through things such as STOL competitions and fly-ins. A subsection of bush pilots have used social media to gain a following, by showing their rural bush flying. However, bush flying still serves as an essential way for many people living in places like Western Alaska, where 82% of towns are not connected by roads, to get food, mail, medical care, etc.

=== Bush flying and social media ===
An emergent niche of bush pilots have capitalized on their social media channels to showcase their rugged backcountry adventures to a larger global audience. They use platforms like TikTok, Instagram, Youtube, and others, to reach global audiences, often gaining hundreds of thousands of followers.

==== Xploring Alaska ====
Jeremy Pepperd is an Alaskan bush pilot, who documents his flying on his Instagram page "Xploringalaska". Jeremy pushes bush flying to the limits in his single engine, SQ12 Supercub. In 2020, he won first place in the Skwetna, Alaska, fly-in and STOL competition. With a landing distance of 85 feet and a takeoff roll of just 89 feet. As of April, 2026, Jeremy has over 290,000 followers on his instagram page and regularly posts videos that garner millions of views.

==== Airtimewithsam ====
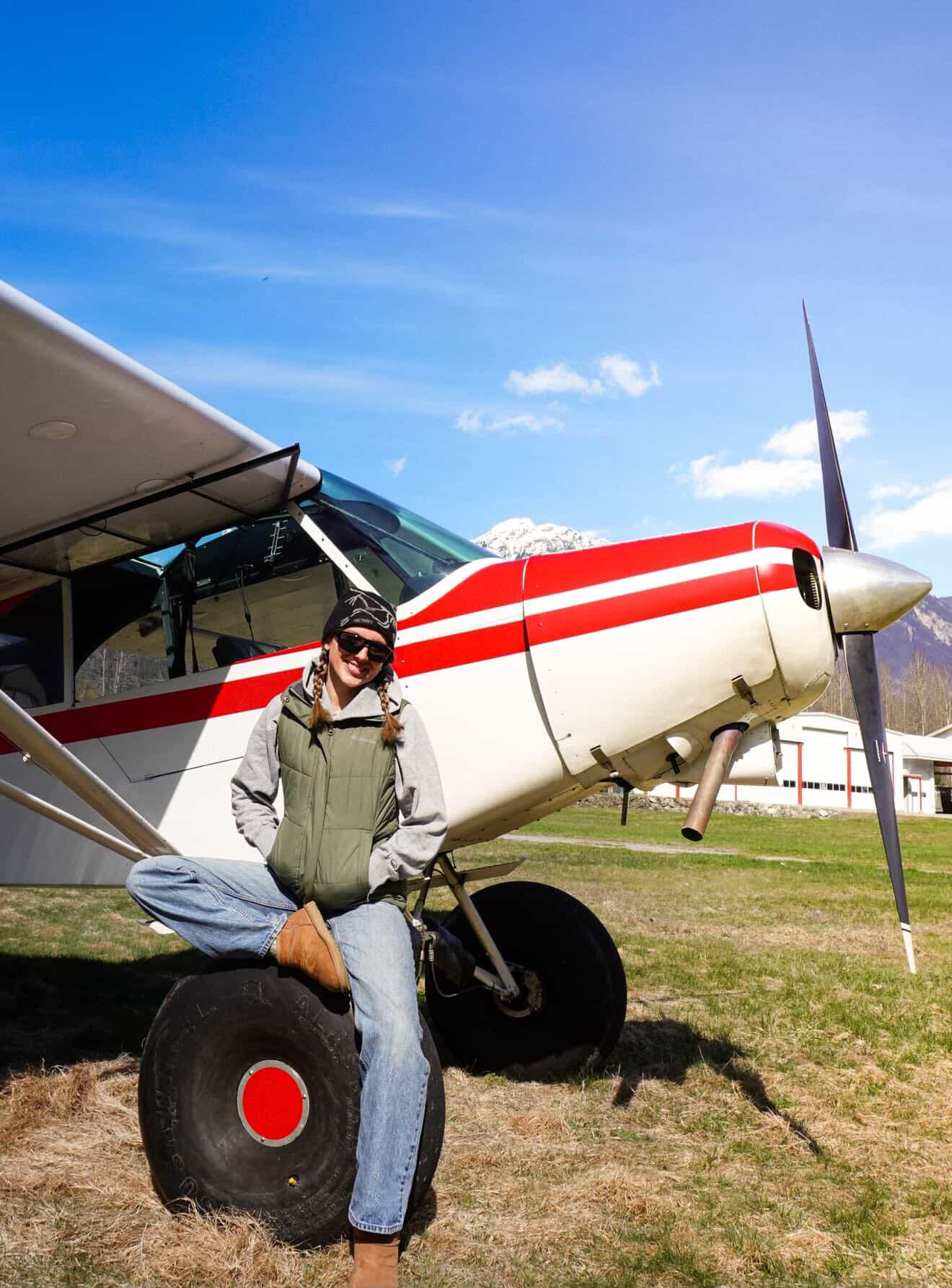
Samantha Porter, pictured with a 1951 PA-18 Super Cub, in Pemberton, British Columbia.

Samantha Porter, who uses the handle "airtimewithsam" on her social media platforms, is a Canadian Bush pilot who frequently documents her adventures on the internet. She has used her social media to act as an advocate to make women feel more comfortable in a male dominated field, hoping that it will spark more women to become pilots. Samantha first gained internet notoriety when she spent over a year circumnavigating the world with her family in a single engine, GA8 AirVan. Samantha and her family attempted this feat with the goal to raise 1 million dollars for SOS Children's Villages. Their chosen path for the circumnavigation went through 45 countries and spanned 45,000 nautical miles. Nowadays, Samantha continues to document her bush flying journey on her Instagram, which as of April, 2026, has over 148,000 followers.

== See also ==
=== In general ===
- Index of aviation articles

=== Notable bush pilots ===
- Jimmie Angel
- Russ Baker
- Arthur Massey Berry
- Rusty Blakey
- Ernest Joseph Boffa
- Wilfred Leigh Brintnell
- Pearl Laska Chamberlain
- Earl Frederick Crabb
- Punch Dickins
- Carl Ben Eielson
- John Emilius Fauquier
- Martin Hartwell
- Tom Lamb
- Hugh Lamprey
- Beryl Markham
- Wop May
- Grant McConachie
- Russel Merrill
- Welland Phipps
- Bob Reeve
- Donald Sheldon
- Max Ward
- Noel Wien

=== Related articles ===
- Royal Flying Doctor Service
- Ontario Provincial Air Service
