= Boffa =

Boffa may refer to:

- Boffa, Guinea, a town and sub-prefecture in Guinea
- Boffa Prefecture, a prefecture in the Boké Region of Guinea
- Boffa Island, an Antarctic island
- people with the surname Boffa, see Boffa (surname)
