= Fairchild Super 71 =

1934 canadian transport aircraft

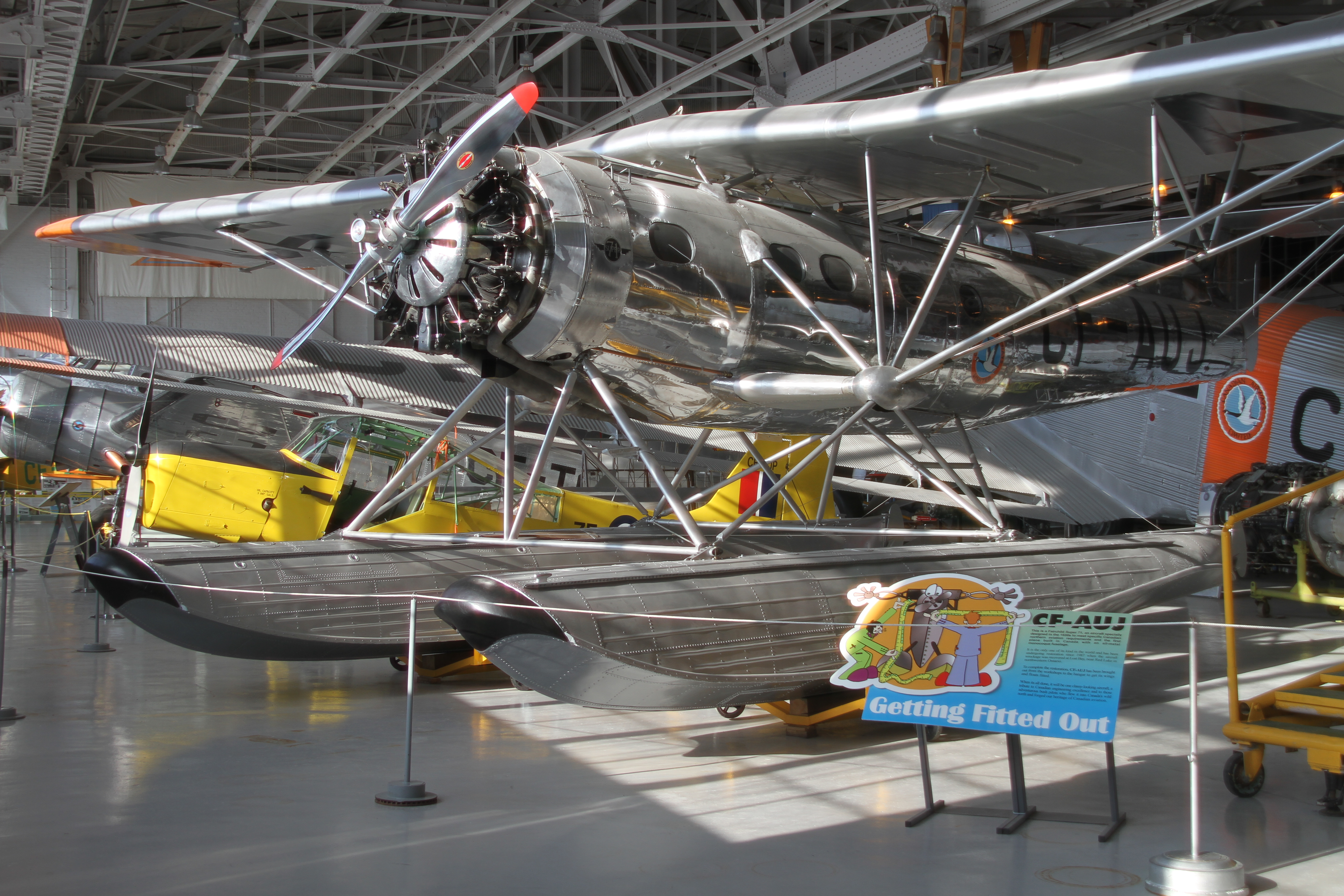
- Restored Fairchild Super 71

General information
- Type: Cargo transport
- Manufacturer: Fairchild Aircraft Ltd. (Canada)
- Number built: 4

History
- First flight: 31 October 1934
- Developed from: Fairchild 71

The Fairchild Super 71 was a Canadian parasol-mounted high-wing monoplane cargo aircraft built by Fairchild Aircraft Ltd. (Canada). The Super 71 was an entirely new design that was one of the first purpose-built civilian bush planes for use in remote and northern locales in Canada.

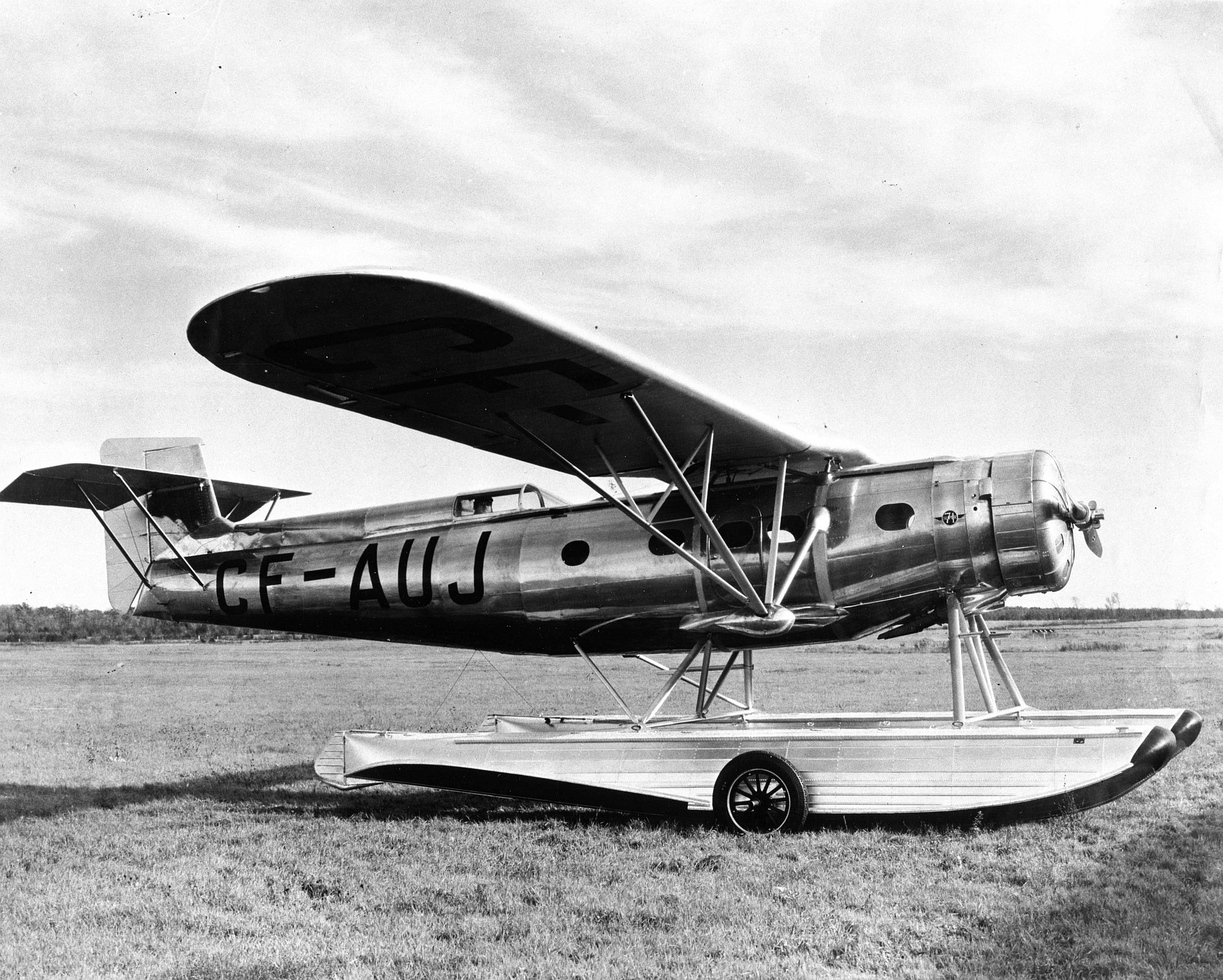
Super 71 prototype CF-AUJ

== Design and development ==
In 1933, the Fairchild Aircraft Company undertook a study of new designs based on their Model 71. A decision to mount a parasol wing above the fuselage coupled with a rear cockpit position, clearly distinguished this model from the rest of the Fairchild 71 series, although the company designation maintained the family lineage. The choice of the unusual cockpit was predicated on the need to have a large front cargo compartment as well as considering the load distribution in normal operation. In use, pilots found that forward vision was compromised to such an extent that few operators favoured the installation and when the Royal Canadian Air Force ordered the type, the specifications included a new cockpit position ahead of the wing and immediately behind the engine.

The design featured a first-of-its-kind (for Canada) duralumin monocoque fuselage with a streamlined oval shape and strut-braced metal wing and tail surfaces. Wind-tunnel testing not only was used to model the fuselage shape but influenced the placement of the tailplane which was altered from its original T-tail position to a high-mounted tailplane intended to keep the tailplane out of the water spray on takeoff. Engine choices varied with six different powerplants offered: the 493 hp (368 kW) Armstrong Siddeley Jaguar, 520 hp (390 kW) Pratt & Whitney T1D1 Wasp, 525 hp (391 kW) Pratt & Whitney S1D1 Wasp, 560 hp (420 kW) Pratt & Whitney SD-1 Hornet, 585 hp (436 kW) Wright SR-1820-F-41 Cyclone and 610 hp (450 kW) Wright SR-1820-F-42 Cyclone.

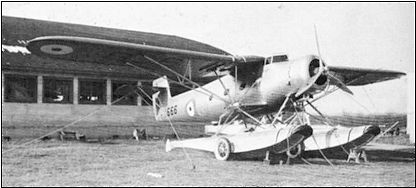
Fairchild Super 71P

== Operational history ==
Equipped with floats and powered by the 525 hp (391 kW) S1D1 Wasp, the Super 71 prototype, CF-AUJ, flew for the first time on 31 October 1934. After the aircraft completed airworthiness tests. it was loaned to Canadian Airways which conducted operational trials in both Quebec and Ontario before the aircraft was written off after running into a submerged log and sinking off Sioux Lookout, Ontario on 3 October 1940. Although the airframe was salvaged, Fairchild did not replace the aircraft with a completed Super 71 still at the factory, as the company was involved in a complete redesign based on the Super 71P (for photographic) variant that had been developed for the RCAF. A new wing mount and the change to a front cockpit were the two visible changes but the variant also had provision for multiple cameras and additional radio equipment. Two examples were built and placed in service in 1936.

The 71P had a chequered history as the type performed poorly in its aerial survey role with No. 666 crashing on 6 August 1937. The list of problems included structural problems with the floats, engine overheating (the prototype had the bottom half of the cowling removed to aid air circulation), adverse handling on the water and on the ground, and problems with the brakes.

The remaining aircraft, No. 665, was assigned to RCAF Station Trenton as an air ambulance but was not used extensively in this role.

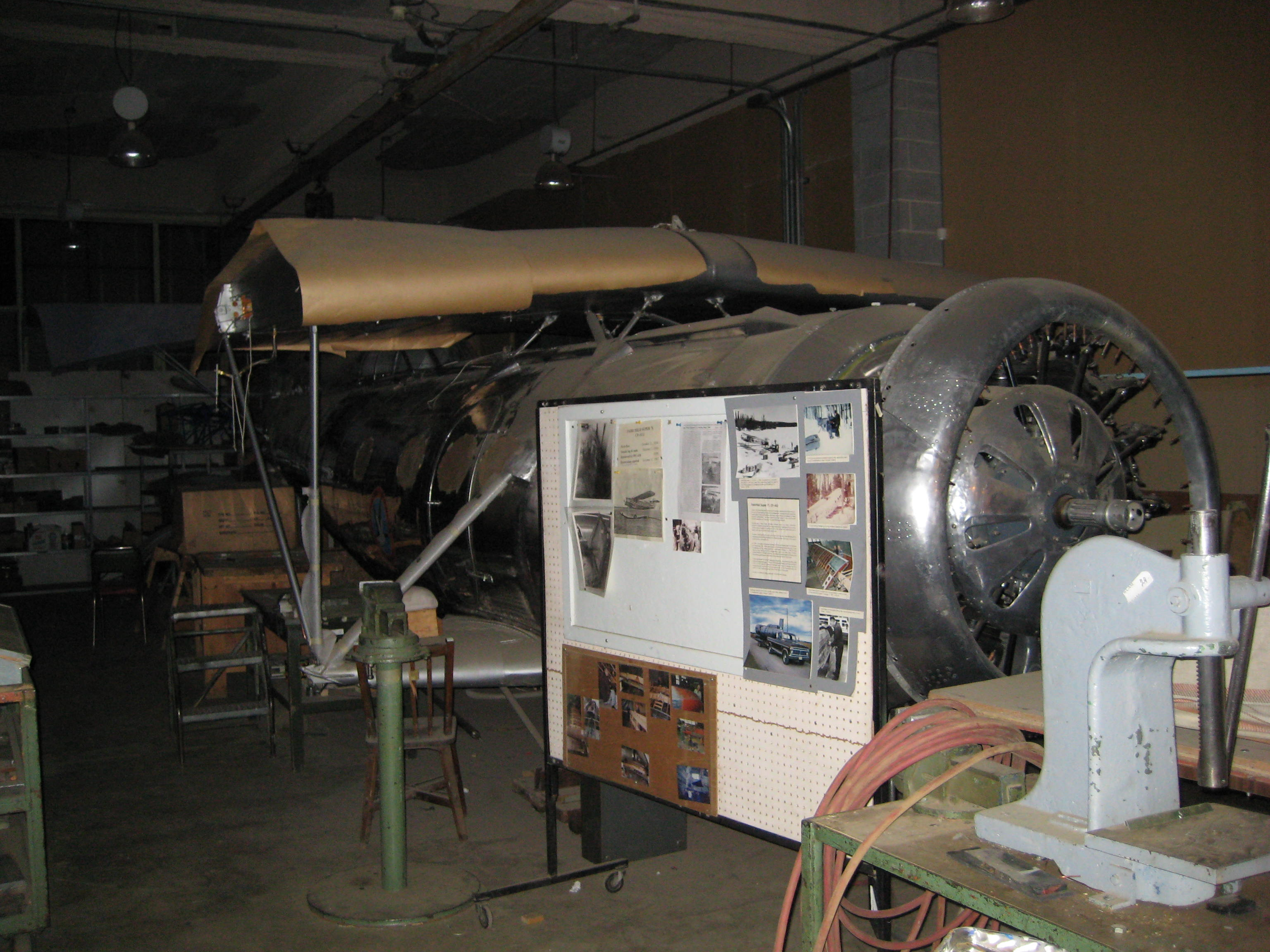
Fairchild Super 71 under restoration

The only surviving airframe is the prototype presently on display at the Royal Aviation Museum of Western Canada in Winnipeg, Manitoba.

== Variants ==
Fairchild Super 71
Prototype (second airframe completed but not flown)
Fairchild Super 71P
Production series with new cockpit location on the fuselage and new wing mounting (2 built)

== Operators ==
Canada

- Royal Canadian Air Force
- Canadian Airways

== Specifications (Super 71) ==
Data from Canadian Aircraft Since 1909

General characteristics

- Crew: 1
- Length: 35 ft 6 in (10.82 m)
- Wingspan: 58 ft 0 in (17.67 m)
- Height: 10 ft 6 in (3.2 m)
- Wing area: 392 sq ft (34.56 m^{2})
- Empty weight: 3,817 lb (1,733 kg)
- Gross weight: 7,000 lb (3,178 kg)
- Powerplant: 1 × Pratt & Whitney T1D1 Wasp 9-cylinder radial piston , 525 hp (388 kW)

Performance

- Maximum speed: 139 mph (223.6 km/h, 121 kn)
- Cruise speed: 125 mph (201.1 km/h, 109 kn)
- Range: 817 mi (1,314 km, 710 nmi)
- Rate of climb: 800 ft/min (4.08 m/s) or 244.8 m/min

== See also ==
Related development

- Fairchild 71

Related lists

- List of aircraft of World War II
