= Ellwood Wilson =

American football quarterback

Profile
- Position: Quarterback

Personal information
- Born: February 16, 1872; Philadelphia, Pennsylvania, U.S.
- Died: May 24, 1952 (aged 80); Montreal, Quebec, Canada

Career information
- High school: Lawrenceville School
- College: Sewanee (1891)

Ellwood Wilson (February 16, 1872 – May 24, 1952) was an American-born college football player who is considered the "founder of Sewanee Tigers football." He introduced the sport to the student body and played quarterback in the school's first intercollegiate game. In 1905, he moved to Canada, where he became one of the country's most "outstanding consulting forestry engineers" as well as a pioneer in aviation.

== Early life ==
Wilson was born on February 16, 1872 in Philadelphia. He attended the Faires Classical Institute, the Lawrenceville School, and the Sewanee Grammar School.

== Sewanee ==
Wilson entered Sewanee: The University of the South in 1889 and worked to get his fellow students interested in football. The students first played with an oval block until they were able to obtain a football. In 1890, Sewanee organized a team to play against an athletic association from Chattanooga, Tennessee, but they could not play an intercollegiate game because there were no other teams in Tennessee or states south of it. On November 7, 1891, Sewanee played its first intercollegiate game against Vanderbilt. Wilson was the team's quarterback and Alex Shepherd, a fellow Lawrenceville graduate who had more experience with the sport, served as team captain. Vanderbilt won the game 22–0. Wilson did not play for another varsity game for Sewanee.

== Life in England and Saranac Lake ==
Wilson did postgraduate work at the University of Pennsylvania, the Fresenius laboratory in Germany, and the Jenner Institute in England. From 1897 to 1901, he was manager of the Walker–Gordon Laboratory Company in London. Wilson then moved to Saranac Lake, New York, where he worked as a civil engineer and was secretary, treasurer and assistant manager of the Meadowbrook Farm Company, which was formed to provide produce, poultry, and dairy to area hotels and residents. He reportedly owned the first car in the village (a Stanley Steamer).

== Forestry ==
In 1905, he moved to Grand-Mère to work as a consulting forestry engineer. In 1907, he was appointed chief forester of the Laurentide Company in Grand-Mère. With Laurentide, he instituted and carried out Canada's largest reforestation project.

Wilson served as president of the Canadian Forestry Association and the Foresters of Great Britain, founded the woodlands section of the Canadian Pulp and Paper Association, the Canadian Society of Forest Engineers (along with G. C. Oiche and Dr. Bernhard Fernow), and the St. Maurice Forest Protective Association (with Samuel Lawrence de Carteret), was a director of the American Forestry Association and the Charles Lathrop Pack Forest Education Board, a fellow of the Society of American Foresters and the American Association for the Advancement of Science, and a delegate to two Imperial Forestry Congresses.

From 1932 to 1934, Wilson was an acting professor of silviculture at Cornell University.

== Defence ==
During World War I, Wilson helped the Imperial Munitions Board obtain spruce for airplane manufacturing. He later served the adjutant and deputy regional director of Civil Defence for the Eastern Townships.

== Aviation ==
Wilson realized that airplanes could be used to spot forest fires and to map forested areas. In early 1919, after he discovered that the U.S. Navy was giving Canada several war-surplus Curtiss HS-2L flying boats, Wilson asked to borrow two. He then hired Captain Stuart Graham to fly the planes. Graham and his engineer, Walter Kahre, then flew the first HS-2L to Lac-à-la-Tortue on 4 June 1919, arriving on 8 June 1919. The flight had covered 645 miles, the longest cross-country flight executed in Canada at the time. He then delivered the other HS-2L to Lac-à-la-Tortue. Equipped with the aircraft, the first bush flights occurred when fire patrol and aerial photography began in the summer of 1919 in the St. Maurice River valley. Due to the high expense, the Laurentide Company underwrote the operation, creating Laurentide Air Services Ltd. with Wilson as president.

From 1922 to 1925, Wilson was president of Fairchild Aircraft Ltd.

== Personal life and death ==
On April 14, 1894, Wilson married Helen Lyman in Orange, New Jersey. They had one daughter and one son. She died in 1904. In 1909, Wilson married Helen Rea of Montreal. They had two sons that survived into adulthood.

Wilson died on May 24, 1952 at the Western Division of the Montreal General Hospital.
