= Fairchild 71 =

American light utility aircraft

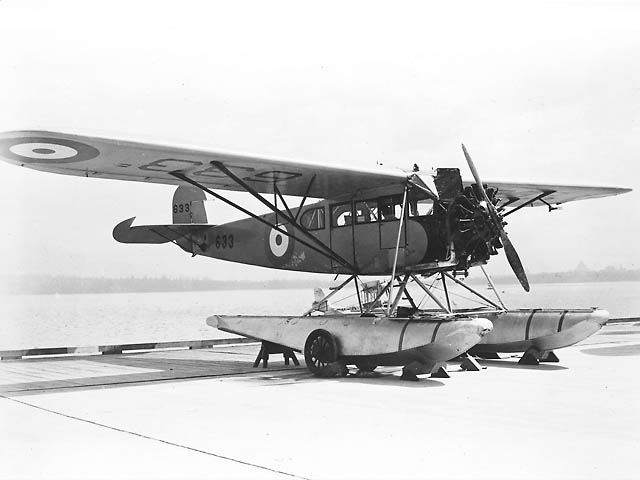
- Fairchild 71 in RCAF colours

General information
- Type: passenger or cargo transport
- Manufacturer: Fairchild Aircraft; Fairchild Aircraft Ltd. (Canada)

History
- First flight: 1926
- Developed into: Fairchild Super 71

The Fairchild 71 is an American high-wing monoplane passenger and cargo aircraft built by Fairchild Aircraft and later built in Canada by Fairchild Aircraft Ltd. (Canada) for both military and civilian use as a rugged bush plane.

== Design and development ==
The Fairchild Aircraft Company undertook a progressive development of the Fairchild FC-2W2 light transport. Its first improvement was the FC-2, whose several improvements included slightly swept-back wings; wingspan increased to 50 feet; engine power nearly doubled; and interior changes to improve passenger comfort.

The FC-2 first flew in 1926.

The FC-2W was a further development, featuring:

- Camera bay for vertical aerial photography;
- Low-cut aft windows for oblique aerial photography.

The FC-2 and FC-2W continued the use of fabric-covered welded steel tubing for fuselage and empennage construction, and strut-braced wooden-structure fabric-covered wings.

The FC-2W, later known as the Model 71, was built in the United States between 1928 and 1930. In 1929 Fairchild formed a company in Canada (Fairchild Aircraft Limited) at Longueuil, Quebec in 1929 to support the Canadian operators of Fairchild aircraft. The Canadian company also set up a factory production line for the Model 71, developing a variant for the Canadian military. The Canadian-built aircraft differed from the US version in that all the passenger-comfort features were removed, and the craft were built specifically for aerial photography.

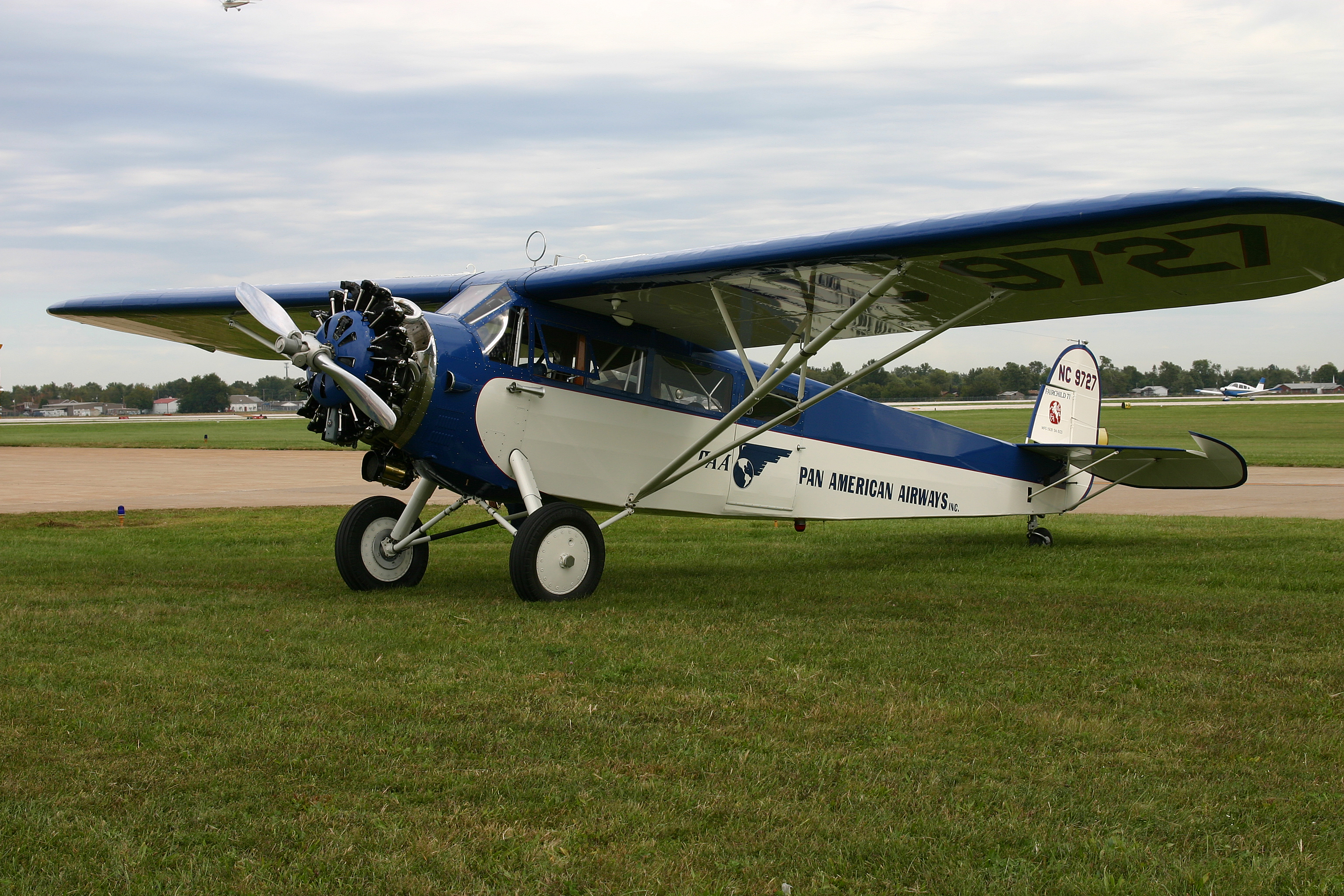
Fairchild 71 in original PanAm colors

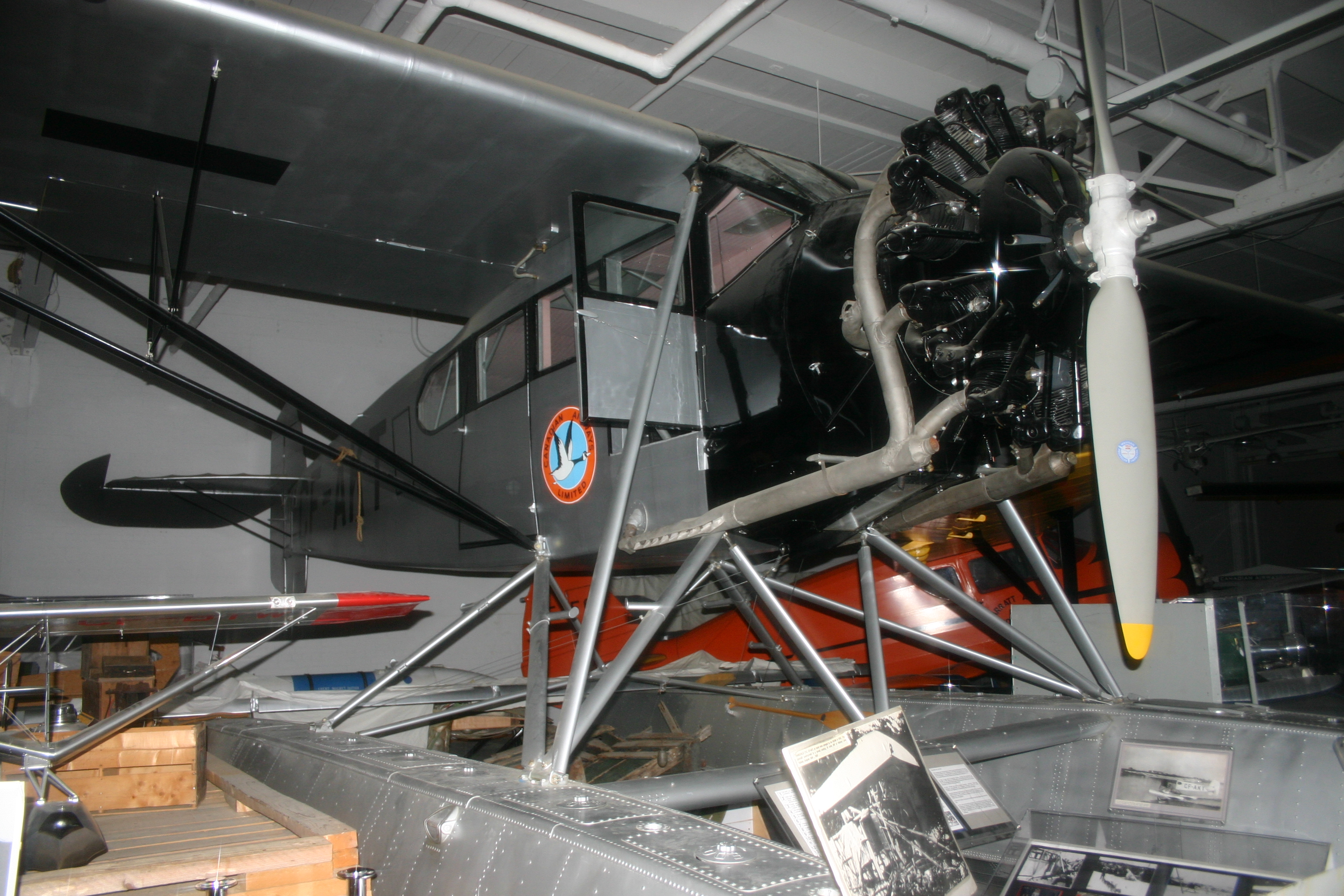
Fairchild 71C at the Western Canada Aviation Museum, Winnipeg, Manitoba.

== Operational history ==
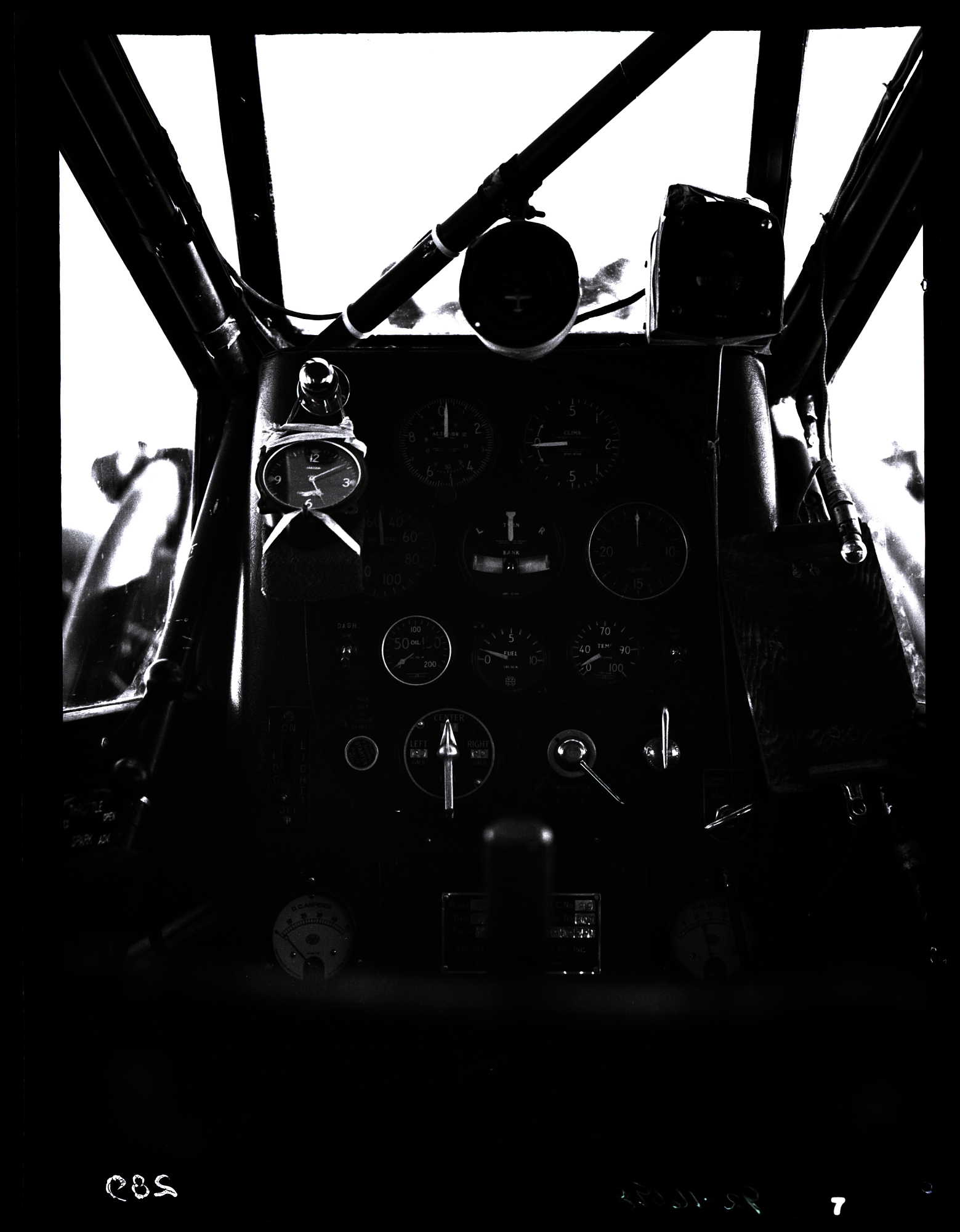
Instrument panel of Fairchild 71

The United States Army Air Service acquired one Model 71 for evaluation; it was designated XC-8, later redesignated XF-1 and used for photographic work.

Eight more service-test aircraft, designated YF-1 were ordered; all nine were later redesignated C-8.

The Royal Canadian Air Force (RCAF), another major military operator, evaluated the Fairchild 71 in mid-June 1930. Thirty four RCAF F-71s were operated from 1930 to 1946. Along with the earlier FC-2 series, the RCAF F-71 was utilized primarily in the aerial photographic survey role as well as northern transport. In November 1934, the RCAF transferred the FC-71s to the five detachments flying in the amalgamated Maritimes No. 5 (Flying Boat) Squadron at RCAF Station Dartmouth. The squadron flew the FC-71 extensively on anti-smuggling (rum running) and illegal immigration patrols for the Royal Canadian Mounted Police (RCMP).

Most of the Model 71 production ended up in the hands of bush plane operators in Canada and the United States. Civilian operators likewise found the 71 a rugged, reliable and a useful utility transport, well suited for northern and remote operations.

== Variants ==
Fairchild 71
Initial production variant
Fairchild 71A
Production variant with increased sweep on wings and improved interior
Fairchild 71C
Canadian-built version
Fairchild 71-CM
Canadian-built version with metal-skinned fuselage
Fairchild Super 71
Floatplane version with new fuselage and greater wingspan
Fairchild 51/71
Canadian-built version with wings of Model 51 and fuselage of Model 71

=== United States military designations ===
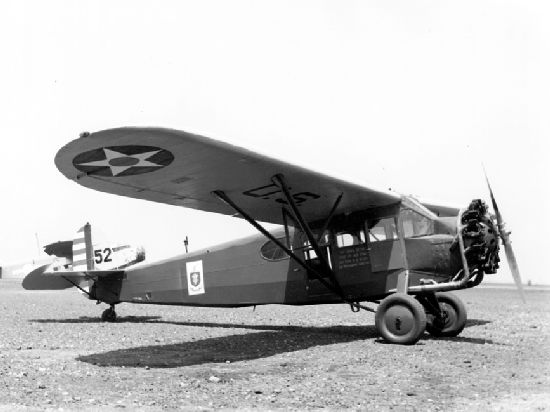
One of the YF-1 aircraft

XC-8
One prototype Fairchild 71, later redesignated XF-1 when modified for photo survey.
XF-1
XC-8 redesignated for photo-survey
YF-1
Eight Fairchild 71 aircraft for evaluation with provision for seven passenger seats, later redesignated C-8.
F-1A
Production aircraft (Fairchild 71A), six built later redesignated C-8A.
C-8
YF-1 redesignated
C-8A
F-1A redesignated
J2Q-1
One Fairchild 71 for evaluation by the United States Navy, redesignated XR2Q-1.

== Operators ==
=== Civilian Operators ===
Mexico

- Aerovias Centrales
- Compañía Mexicana de Aviación

United States

- Clifford Ball Inc.
- Pacific Alaska Airways
- Pan American Airways
- Pan American-Grace Airways

Saudi Arabia

- California-Arabian Standard Oil Co.

=== Military operators ===
Canada

- Royal Canadian Air Force

United States

- United States Army Air Corps
- United States Navy

== Specifications (Model 71C) ==
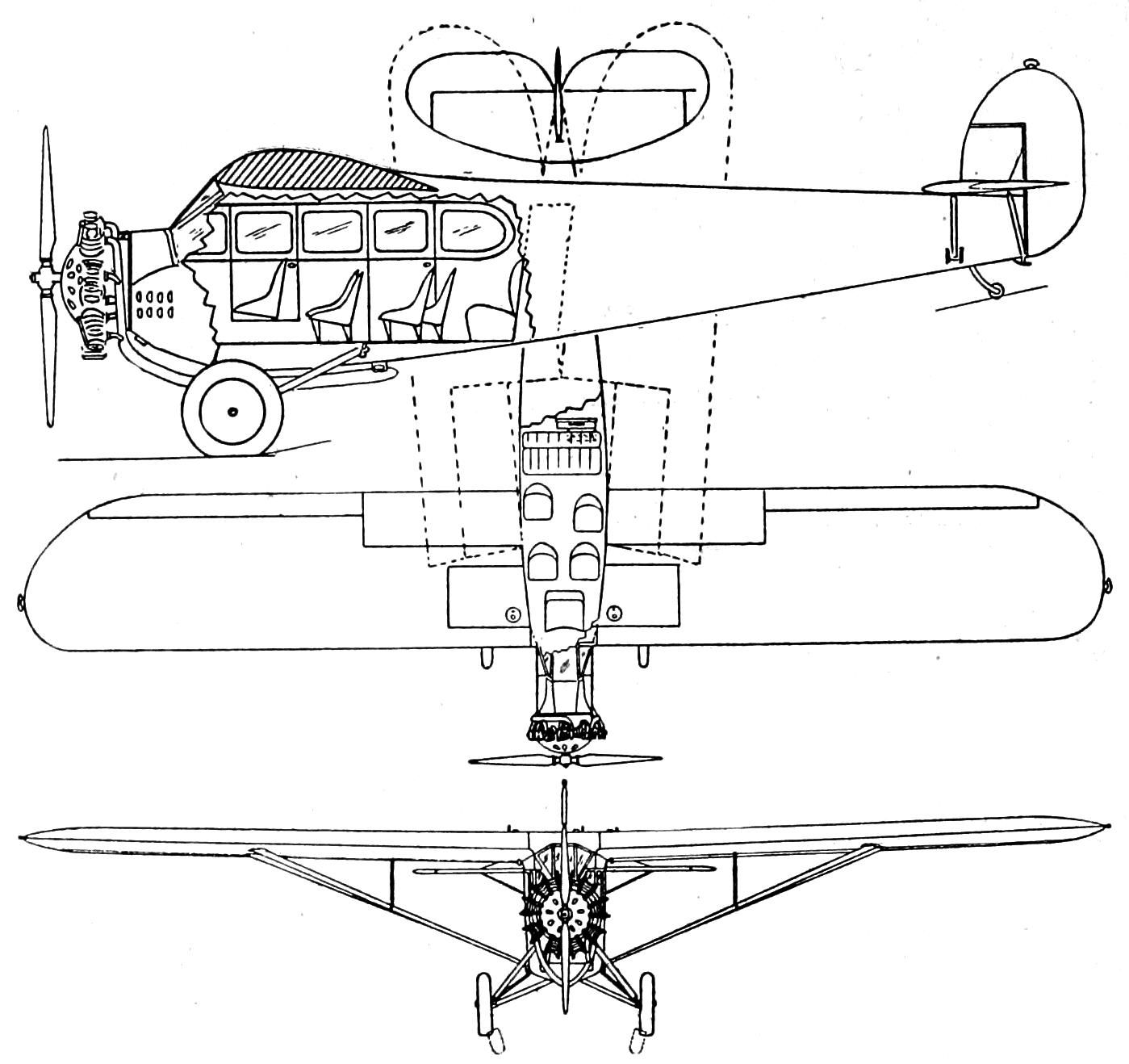
Fairchild 71 3-view drawing from Aero Digest February 1929

Data from Canadian Aircraft Since 1909

General characteristics

- Crew: one
- Capacity: eight
- Length: 35 ft 10.25 in (10.93 m)
- Wingspan: 50 ft 0 in (15.39 m)
- Height: 9 ft 4 in (2.84 m)
- Wing area: 309.6 sq ft (28.76 m^{2})
- Empty weight: 3,168 lb (1,438 kg)
- Gross weight: 6,000 lb (2,724 kg)
- Powerplant: 1 × Pratt & Whitney Wasp B/C 9-cylinder radial piston , 420 hp (310 kW)

Performance

- Maximum speed: 132 mph (212.4 km/h, 115 kn)
- Cruise speed: 106 mph (170.5 km/h, 92 kn)
- Range: 817 mi (1,314 km, 710 nmi)
- Service ceiling: 11,000 ft (3,353 m)
- Rate of climb: 600 ft/min (3.0 m/s)

== See also ==
Related development

- Fairchild Super 71

Aircraft of comparable role, configuration, and era

- Bellanca CH-300 Pacemaker
- Bellanca CH-400 Skyrocket
- Curtiss Thrush
- Ryan Brougham
- Stinson Detroiter
- Travel Air 6000

Related lists

- List of bush planes
- List of light transport aircraft
- List of aircraft of World War II
