= Rusty Blakey =

Canadian aviator

- Born: Thurston Blakey; December 12, 1911; Ravenna, Ontario, Canada
- Died: October 10, 1986 (aged 74); Sudbury, Ontario, Canada
- Occupation(s): Aviator, bush pilot
- Spouse: Pearl

Thurston "Rusty" Blakey (December 12, 1911 – October 11, 1986) was a pioneering Canadian aviator and bush pilot.

== Biography ==
The Ravenna, Ontario born Thurston Blakely (December 12, 1911) grew up in Bruce Mines with an aunt and uncle after being orphaned in childhood. He went to work in 1935 for Austin Airways, a charter service and flyings school at Ramsey Lake, becoming a licensed pilot in March 1938. Commonly known as "Rusty", Blakey flew for almost 50 years, with over 30,000 hours in single-engine aircraft, without mechanical aid. Over a third of those hours were logged in Austin Airway's Noorduyn Norseman, CF-BSC. He continued piloting until October 10, 1986, the day before he died.

An aerial photographer whose work included medical evacuation flights and deliveries—not only miners and their equipment, but also supplies and mail to the James Bay Inuit—Blakey is particularly notable for his role in aerial firefighting. In 1948, he became the first pilot to drop dry ice, which would become a major technique in wildfire suppression.

== Honours and legacy ==
Blakey was honored multiple times before and after his death. In 1985, he became a Member of the Order of Canada. In 1986, he was bestowed an Honorary Life Membership in the Canadian Owners and Pilots Association (C.O.P.A.). In 1992, he was inducted into Canada’s Aviation Hall of Fame.

In his honour, a monument was erected at Science North, Ramsey Lake, by the Rusty Blakey Heritage Aviation Group. It is the site of an annual Rusty Blakey Air Show.
