= Fairchild 45-80 Sekani =

1937 Canadian transport aircraft

45-80 Sekani
- Fairchild 45-80 Sekani (CF-BHD c/n 101) c. 1937

General information
- Type: Passenger/cargo transport
- Manufacturer: Fairchild Aircraft Ltd. (Canada)
- Designer: Nathan Floyd Vanderlipp
- Status: prototypes only
- Number built: 2

History
- First flight: 24 August 1937

The Fairchild 45-80 Sekani (named for an indigenous people of Canada) was a Canadian twin-engined transport aircraft developed in Canada in the late 1930s. Although the 45-80 was the largest bush plane developed by Fairchild, its poor performance doomed the project, and nearly the company.

== Design and development ==
Designed by Fairchild (Canada) in the hope of attracting orders from the Royal Canadian Air Force and Canadian Airways, the 45-80 was an ambitious project, being the largest design yet attempted. The Sekani was a large sesquiplane of conventional configuration, with the sets of wings joined to the top and bottom of the fuselage and braced by N-struts. The lower set of wings were little more than stubs; their bracing to the upper wings passed through the engine nacelles (mounted on the upper wings), and they carried the pontoon undercarriage beneath them. Following typical Fairchild construction, the fuselage and empennage were made of fabric-covered welded steel tubing while the main wings were a combination of spruce spars and stainless steel ribs, also fabric covered. The "stub" wings were of heavy steel construction. The retractable undercarriage (a first for a Canadian designed aircraft) also featured streamlined fairings when the aircraft was equipped with skis.

Testing commenced in August 1937 and revealed a number of serious deficiencies in the design, including that the aircraft was overweight and impossible to control directionally when flying on only one engine as the ailerons caused severe drag tending to turn the aircraft in the opposite direction.

== Operational history ==
The RCAF tested the 45-80 in October 1937, investigating its potential as a photographic platform, but ultimately rejecting it. Canadian Airways tests showed that the new design had a payload capacity no greater than the single-engine types that they were already operating. A second prototype was built, but the whole project was soon abandoned with the completed prototypes along with three unassembled production examples being scrapped.

Fairchild recovered from the financial disaster that was looming after the Sekani's cancellation when the company landed a lucrative contract to build Bristol Bolingbroke bombers as part of the shadow factory system that was set up to supply RAF needs.

== Specifications ==
Data from Canadian Aircraft Since 1909

General characteristics

- Crew: Two pilots
- Capacity: 12 passengers
- Length: 11.94 m (39 ft 2 in)
- Wingspan: 17.27 m (57 ft 0 in)
- Height: 3.63 m (11 ft 11 in)
- Wing area: 54.3 m^{2} (584.5 sq ft)
- Empty weight: 3,223 kg (7,100 lb)
- Gross weight: 4,313 kg (9,500 lb)
- Powerplant: 2 × Pratt & Whitney Wasp Junior , 300 kW (400 hp) each

Performance

- Maximum speed: 308.9 km/h (192 mph, 167 kn)
- Cruise speed: 275.1 km/h (171 mph, 149 kn)
- Service ceiling: 4,572 m (15,000 ft)
- Rate of climb: 6.0 m/s (1,180 ft/min)
