= Pearl Laska Chamberlain =

American pilot

Pearl L. Chamberlain
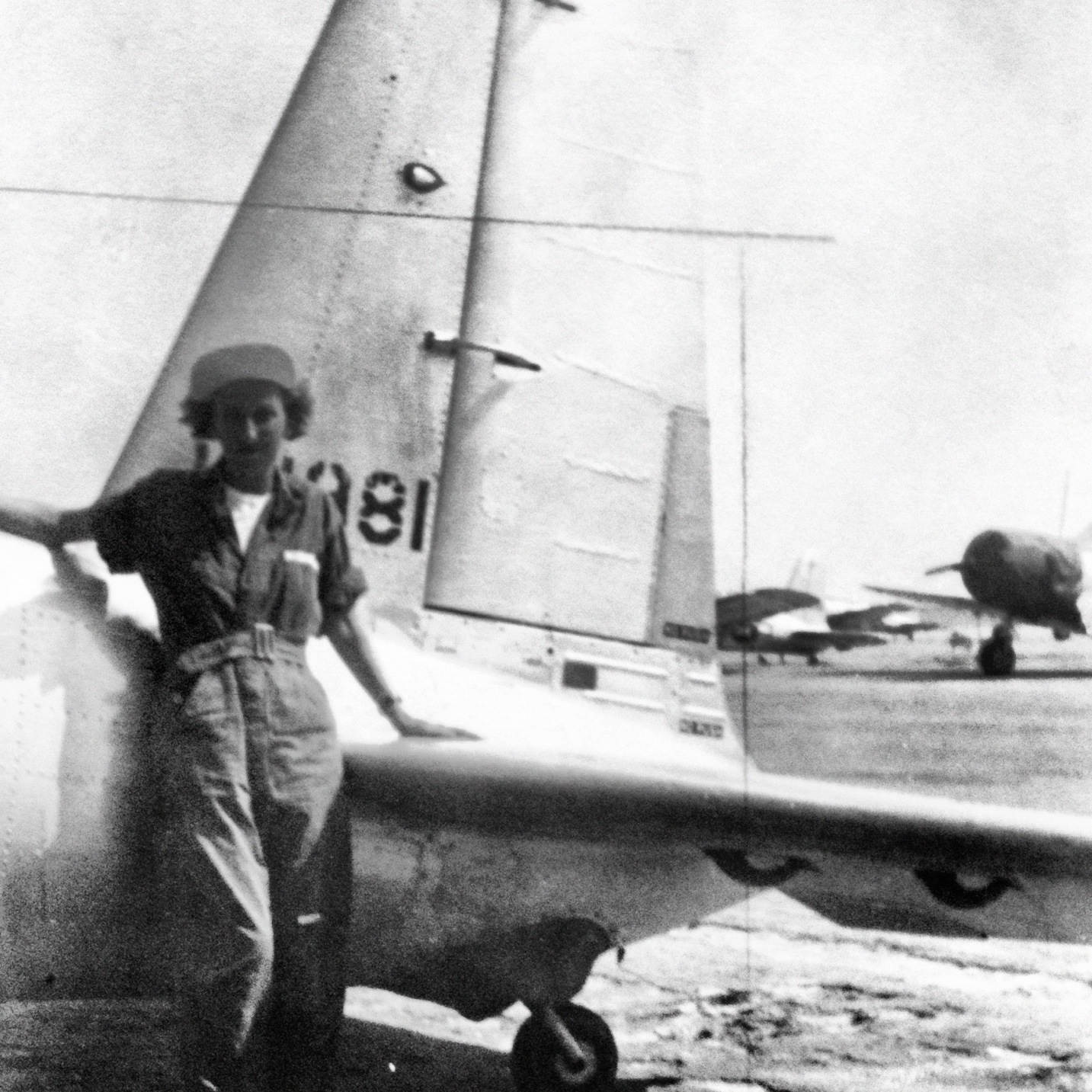
- Pearl Laska Chamberlain, WASP trainee
- Born: Lelia Pearl Bragg; April 29, 1909; Chestnut Mountain, Summers County, West Virginia, U.S.
- Died: November 22, 2012 (aged 103); Richland Place Nursing Home, Nashville, Tennessee, U.S.
- Occupation: Pilot
- Spouse(s): Lewis Lincoln Laska; Ed Chamberlain
- Children: Lewis L. Laska (born 1947)

Pearl Laska Chamberlain (born Lelia Pearl Bragg; April 29, 1909 – November 22, 2012) was an American female pilot. She learned to fly in a Kinner Fleet bi-plane in 1933 and held a pilot’s certificate until she was 97. Prior to World War II, the federal government established the Civilian Pilot Training Program, a back-door method to train pilots for military service.

One of eight children born to John W. and Lanie C. Bragg, she joined the WASPs during WWII and was honorably discharged. In 1944, following her dream to be a full-time pilot, Pearl moved to Nome, Alaska and worked as a flight instructor and bush pilot. Her adventures as a pilot involved everything from Powder Puff Derbies to filling her tank with water instead of gasoline. The next year she became the first woman to solo a single-engine airplane (a 1939 Piper J-4) up the Alaska Highway. The FAA recognized her achievements as a pioneer Alaska aviator in 2006. Scorning the belief that Alaska Natives were unable to learn flying, she taught many, including Holger Jorgensen, who became the first Native hired as a pilot by a scheduled airline. She held a pilot's certificate until she was 97 and was a lifetime member of the Ninety Nines.

She earned her undergraduate degree from the University of Alaska in 1955, and her master's degree from Miami University of Ohio in 1959.

== Awards ==
- 2006: Received the Wright Brothers Master Pilot Award.
- 2007: Ninety Nines Award of Achievement.
- 2020: Honored with a historical marker in Sandstone, West Virginia.

== Family ==
In 1946, she wed Lewis Lincoln Laska, a merchant and fur dealer in McGrath, Alaska. Lew Laska died four months later at the age of 50. Their son, Lewis, was born the following year, in 1947. She ran her husband's store and parka factory for another four years after his death. She remarried to Ed Chamberlain, with whom she lived in California until his death in 1987.
