= Boffa (surname) =

Boffa is a surname of Italian origin, believed to have been a nickname for a person who suffered from shortness of breath, or breathed rapidly or heavily (from the Old Italian boffare "to pant", "to puff"). The Boffa name is believed to have arrived in Malta in the late 16th Century with a reference from 1602 to a marriage in parish records of St Lawrence in the town of Birgu (referred to also as Vittoriosa following the Great Siege of 1565). The name is still not very common in Malta and did not appear in the Status Animarum (diocesan census) of 1687. The name is believed to have originated in the town of Viggiano in the province of Potenza in southern Italy, where it still appears in official records. From Viggiano and Malta, the name has spread to the United Kingdom, Australia and the USA.

People with the surname Boffa include:

- Ernest Joseph Boffa (1904–2004), a Canadian bush pilot
- Giuseppe Boffa (1923–1998), Italian journalist, historian and politician
- Menato Boffa (1930–1996), an Italian racing driver
- Sir Paul Boffa, OBE (1890–1962), Prime Minister of Malta (1947–1950)
- Stefania Boffa (born 1988), a Swiss tennis player
