= Fairchild F-11 Husky =

1946 Canadian bush plane

F-11 Husky
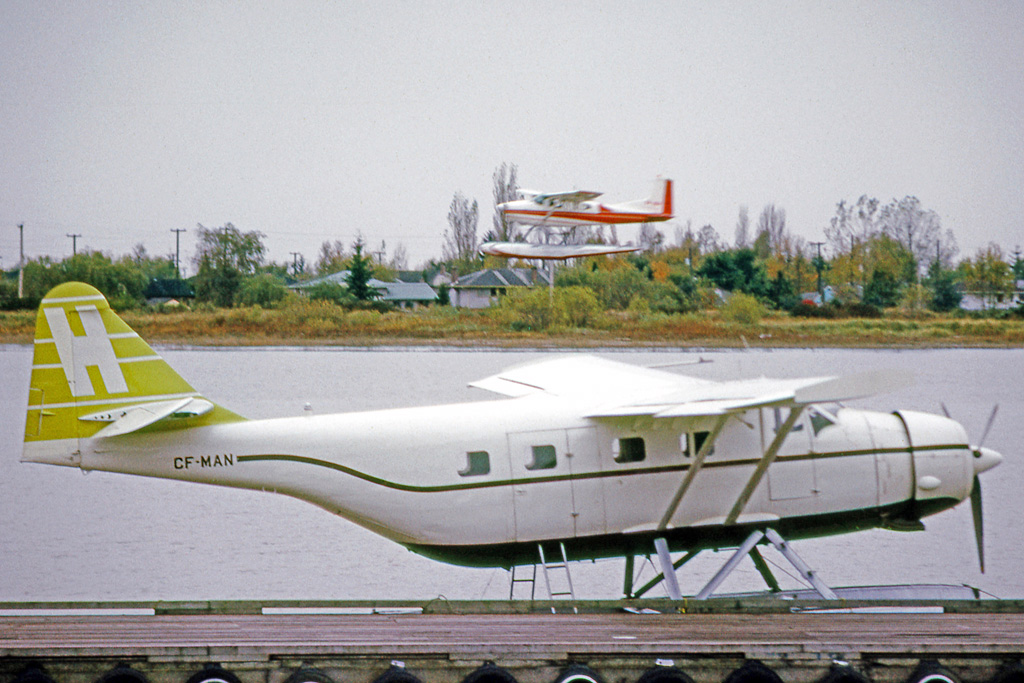
- Fairchild Husky of Harrison Airways operating on floats at Vancouver International Airport's seaplane base in 1973. This aircraft is ex Manitoba Government.

General information
- Type: STOL bush plane
- Manufacturer: Fairchild Aircraft Ltd. (Canada)
- Designer: J.A.T. Butler
- Status: Retired
- Number built: 12

History
- Manufactured: 1946-1950
- Introduction date: 1946
- First flight: 14 June 1946

The Fairchild F-11 Husky was a Canadian bush plane designed and manufactured in the post-Second World War era. Despite a promising design, a lack of a suitable powerplant hurt performance, and stiff competition from the de Havilland Beaver and de Havilland Otter designs meant the type never gained a solid foothold in the marketplace.

== Design and development ==
With the end of its wartime contracts in 1945, Fairchild ventured back into familiar territory with the design and manufactures of a modern bush plane, the F-11 Husky. Fairchild Aircraft Ltd. (Canada) (Montreal) under the new Fairchild Industries Ltd. banner (the subsidiary company was created in spring 1945), designed and built the F-11 Husky in 1946. It was intended to replace the pre-war bush planes such as the Noorduyn Norseman as well as various Junkers and the Fokkers. It incorporated many of the features suggested by bush operators, such as a rear loading door, which enabled it to handle long loads. However, because of its large cabin area and low-powered engine, it was very easy to overload.

The Husky emerged as an interesting concept but a number of factors combined to doom the project. The Fairchild Husky was a rugged, mainly metal (wing surfaces were fabric covered aft of the front spar) transport able to haul up to eight passengers and cargo. Innovative features included a high aspect ratio wing and slotted flaps for STOL performance and a unique upswept rear fuselage with a door/ramp allowing large loads to be fitted into the fuselage. Although the Fairchild Husky had many desirable features, it never became popular because of its original 450 hp Pratt & Whitney Wasp Jr. engine was not powerful enough. Plans were made to refit the Husky with the 550 hp Alvis Leonides engine and later, a 625 hp Leonides.

The more powerful engines greatly improved performance, but by this time the Fairchild Company was in financial difficulties. The company also found the number of surplus Noorduyn Norseman bush planes available at reasonable prices as well as the onset of the Beaver made it particularly difficult to market a new bush plane. With only 12 Huskies completed, Fairchild Industries went bankrupt, forcing the eventual demise of the parent company in 1948 and the surrender of its charter in 1950.

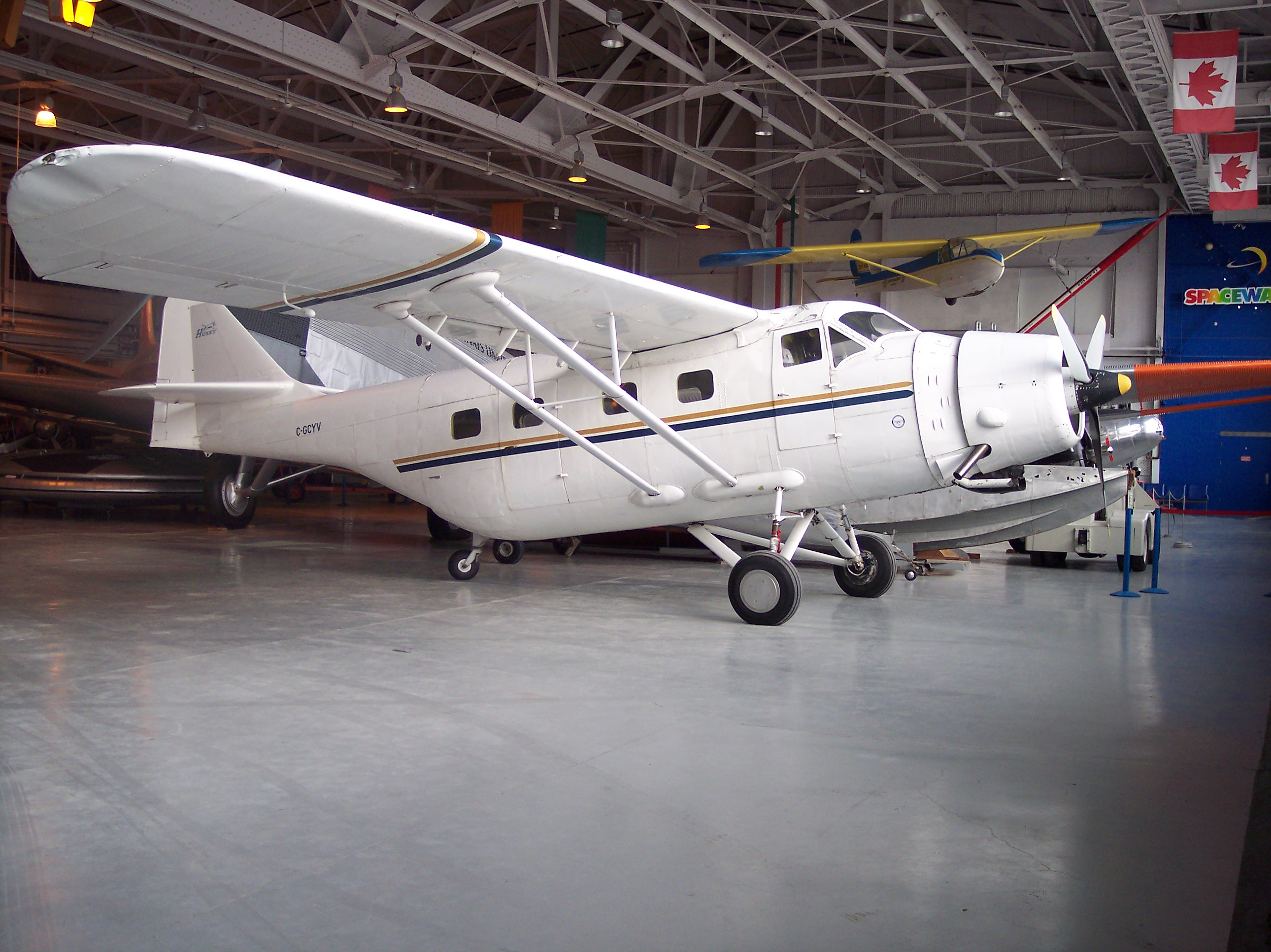
Fairchild F-11-2 on display at the Western Canada Aviation Museum, Winnipeg, Manitoba c. 2007

== Operational history ==
The Fairchild Husky was used in a variety of bush operations, usually operating from either skis or floats. The Manitoba Government Air Services (which had three), Sherritt Gordon Mines, Austin Airways, Nickel Belt Airways and other air carriers purchased the type. Operators buying the Husky secondhand included Harrison Airways based at Vancouver BC.

=== Bush pilot endorsement ===
Although underpowered, the Fairchild Husky gained respect from its operators. Pilot Ralph Shapland flew the aircraft from 1946–1954 while flying for the Sherrit Gordon Mines in northern Manitoba. Earl Beaty was the company radio operator and described it as "a new bush plane model with a large freighting type body and a new idea whereby they could slide a canoe into the body from the rear thru (sic) two small doors. The usual way of carrying a canoe was to tie it to the floats struts on the side of the aircraft. This new idea didn't do the job much better as it took up cargo space so wasn't used that much. This aircraft was close to the load carrying capacity of the Norseman, which was the most common bush aircraft at the time."

With the collapse of the Fairchild company after only 12 examples had been produced, the design and manufacturing rights to the Fairchild Husky were acquired first by Nickel Belt Airways, and later by Boreal Airways before transferring to Husky Aircraft, who attempted a redesign, based on an upgraded 550 hp Alvis Leonides installation. Eventually the rights were acquired in 1970 by Industrial Wings, a subsidiary of Harrison Airways. A number of airframes were converted to a later standard and although plans were made to switch to turbine power, all the later redesigns remained paper projects only.

== Variants ==
F-11-1 Husky
Single-engined STOL utility transport aircraft, powered by a 450 hp (336-kW) Pratt & Whitney Wasp Junior radial piston engine, original Fairchild version.
F-11-2 Husky
Six F-11 Husky aircraft were fitted with the 550 hp (410 kW) Alvis Leonides radial piston engine.
F-11-3 Husky
Fitted with 625 hp Alvis Leonides 531/8 (not built).
F-11-4 Husky
Fitted with 600 hp Pratt & Whitney R-1340 S!H1-G (not built).
F-11-5 Husky
Fitted with 725 hp Pratt & Whitney Canada PT6A-27 (not built).

== Surviving aircraft ==
The surviving Husky aircraft in both F-11-1 and -2 variants flew into the late 1980s but none are now known to remain in active service. Both the Western Canada Aviation Museum in Winnipeg, Manitoba and the Canadian Bushplane Heritage Centre in Sault Ste Marie, Ontario have restored examples in their collections.

== Specifications (F-11-1 Husky floatplane) ==
Data from

General characteristics

- Crew: 2
- Capacity:
  - 8 passengers or
  - 2,900 lb (1,300 kg) payload as a floatplane
- Length: 37 ft 5 in (11.40 m) fuselage
- Wingspan: 54 ft 9 in (16.69 m)
- Height: 17 ft 9 in (5.41 m) fuselage level
- Wing area: 355 sq ft (33.0 m^{2})
- Aspect ratio: 8.45
- Empty weight: 4,540 lb (2,059 kg)
- Gross weight: 6,300 lb (2,858 kg)
- Powerplant: 1 × Pratt & Whitney R-985 -T1B / -8B3 Wasp Junior 9-cyl. air-cooled radial piston engine, 450 hp (340 kW)
- Propellers: 2-bladed constant-speed propeller

Performance

- Maximum speed: 138 mph (222 km/h, 120 kn) at 2,300 ft (700 m)
- Cruise speed: 121 mph (195 km/h, 105 kn)
- Stall speed: 58 mph (93 km/h, 50 kn) with 40° flap; 67 mph (58 kn; 108 km/h) with no flaps
- Rate of climb: 675 ft/min (3.43 m/s)
- Wing loading: 17.75 lb/sq ft (86.7 kg/m^{2})
- Power/mass: 14 lb/hp (8.516 kg/kW)

== See also ==
Aircraft of comparable role, configuration, and era

- de Havilland Beaver
- de Havilland Otter
- Noorduyn Norseman

Related lists

- List of airliners
