= Fairchild Aircraft Ltd. =

1920–1950 aircraft manufacturer in Canada

Fairchild Aircraft Ltd. (Canada)
- Type: Aircraft manufacturer
- Founded: 1920
- Founder: Sherman Fairchild
- Defunct: 1950
- Headquarters: Longueuil, Quebec, Canada
- Parent: Fairchild Aviation

Fairchild Aircraft Ltd. was an aircraft manufacturer active at Longueuil, Quebec, Canada in the period 1920–50. It served as a subsidiary of the Fairchild Aircraft company of the United States. Initially acting as a servicing organization, the company expanded into aircraft manufacturing to build utility aircraft appropriate for the Canadian climate, producing bush planes such as the Fairchild Cabin and the Fairchild 82A.

== History ==
=== Origin ===
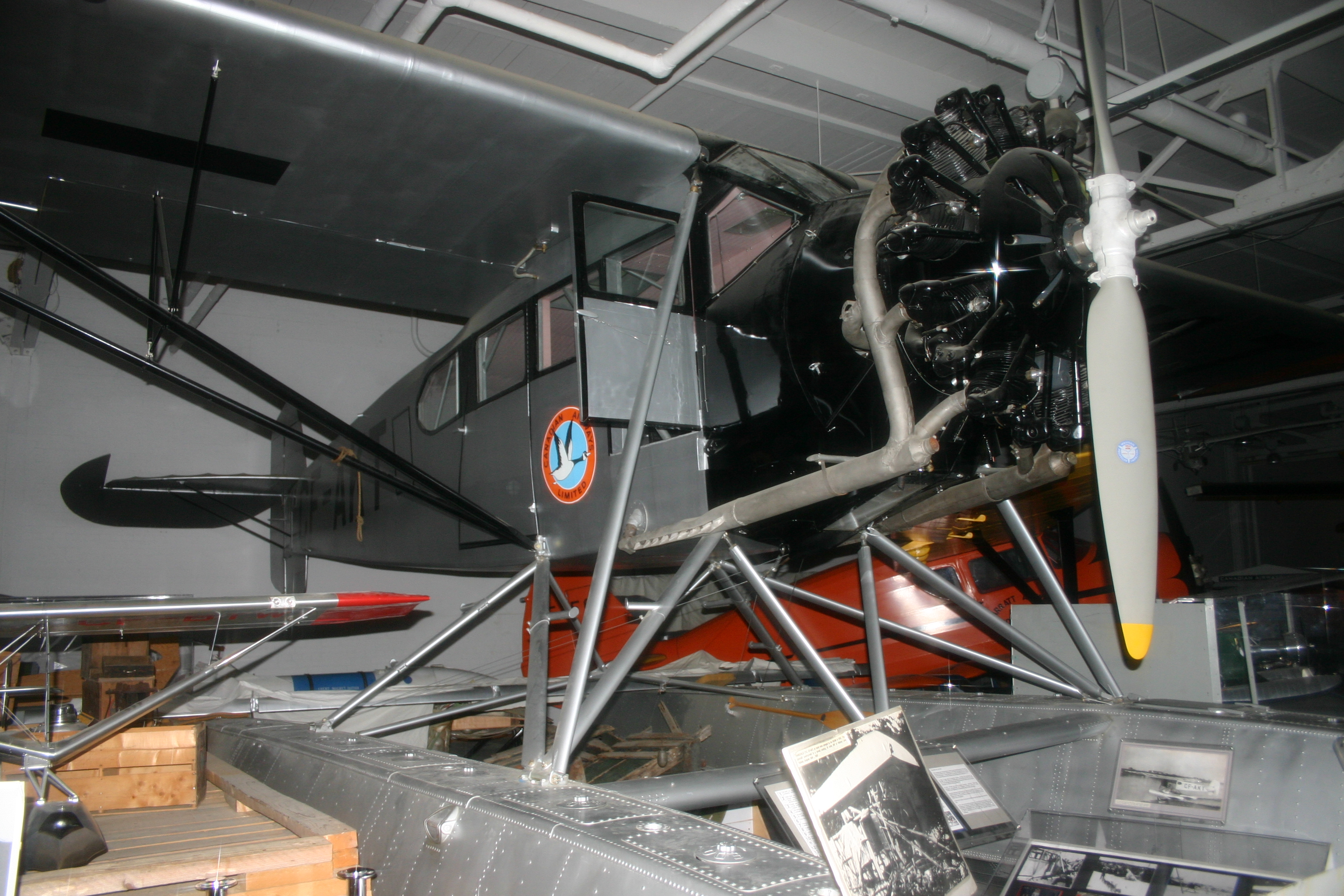
Fairchild 71C at the Western Canada Aviation Museum, Winnipeg, Manitoba in Canadian Airways livery

Fairchild Aircraft Ltd. came about a result of the aviation activities of the St. Maurice Valley Protective Association beginning in 1919. This association was the first to use aircraft for commercial purposes in Canada. From the St. Maurice Association, Fairchild Aerial Surveys of Canada Ltd. was formed in 1922.

Until 1929, Fairchild Aircraft Ltd. acted solely as a servicing organization dealing with forestry, mapping, surveying (aerial photography), fire detection and reforestation. "Forester extraordinaire," Ellwood Wilson, was the man responsible for creating this specialized Canadian company. The first planes used were 12 Curtiss HS-2Ls. Problems with this seaplane arose when water entered the rubber seals, froze and cracked. The need for utility aircraft appropriate for the Canadian climate, sparked the company to expand into the construction and adaptation of aircraft for the Canadian government.

=== First aircraft ===
A great deal of the work to open up the Canadian North, was carried out by Fairchild Cabin (FC) types and a number were used in Alaska for the same purpose. The Fairchild FC-2W-2 is typical of a number of single radial-engined cabin monoplanes manufactured during the second half of the 1920s and into the early 1930s, that were built in the United States and to a lesser extent in Canada. Most of them were utility aircraft that could perform a number of roles and could be utilized on wheels floats, or skis. These aircraft played a major part in the rapid development of aviation during this period until they were succeeded by newer types later in the 1930s.

Fairchild aircraft were to be found from northern Canada and Alaska down through the United States, Central America to South America where they operated in some of the countries there. They were purchased by civil operators, governments and the military. Their main functions involved carrying of passenger and/or freight, air mail but also performed admirably in the role of aerial surveying.

The first RCAF orders made with the new Canadian Fairchild Aircraft Ltd. were for Model 71Bs which had been designed to RCAF requirements in the United States with the parent company, Fairchild Airplane Manufacturing Corp. The 71Bs were put to use largely for photographic and transport duties. Twelve Fairchild 71Bs were on strength with the RCAF from 20 May 1930 to 2 October 1941 although one (G-CYVE/630) was later converted to a 71C. On 6 July 1930, Fairchild 71B, G-CYVX began a long inspection trip of the Canadian Arctic.

The Fairchild 82A was a Canadian-designed successor to the FC-2W-2 and 71 models. It won immediate acceptance by Canadian bush operators who appreciated its good load-lifting capabilities for freight. The 82A proved to be one of the north's most reliable bush aircraft. The type was made in Canada and seven were exported to Mexico and South America. Only 24 were built once construction was phased out to make room to produce the Bristol Bolingbroke. An attempt to design a more capable large bush plane resulted in the Fairchild 45-80 Sekani, a twin-engined sesquiplane. Testing revealed a number of troubling faults leading to rejection by both the RCAF and Canadian Airways. After only two aircraft were built and tested, the project was abandoned.

For bush use, some operators preferred the Fairchild 82A to the more famous Noorduyn Norseman. The last 82A in service disappeared on a flight in the Northwest Territories on June 9, 1964.

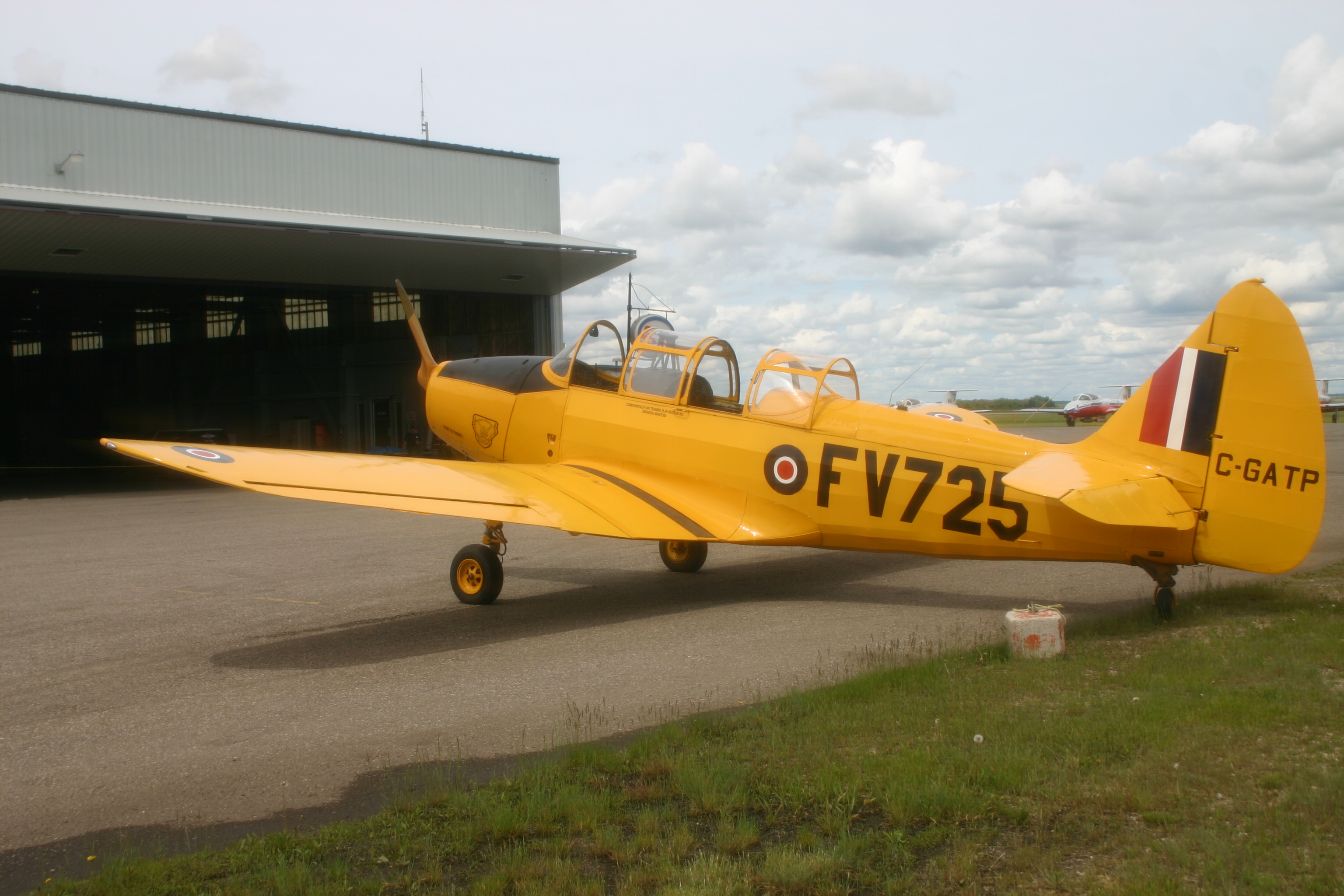
Fairchild PT-26B Cornell in flying condition at the Commonwealth Air Training Plan Museum, Brandon, Manitoba, 2005

=== The Second World War ===
The Fairchild Aircraft Company of Hagerstown, Maryland, was awarded a US Army Air Force contract in 1938 for a tandem cockpit, primary trainer. The aeroplane was called "Cornell" after the famous university. An overall total of 7260 were eventually constructed by mid-1944.

The RCAF selected the Cornell as a successor to the Tiger Moth and Fleet Finch, which the Air Force realized in 1941 were already obsolete because they lacked the full instrumentation of the Cornell. In Canada, the Fleet Aircraft Company (Canada) built 1642 Cornells under licence, designated either as PT-19s or PT-26s. The latter were distinguished by their cold-weather, enclosed canopy. The RCAF first flew Cornells in 1940 and retired the last one in 1947.

In the same year as production started on the Cornell project, Fairchild had joined with five other companies in setting up Canadian Associated Aircraft Ltd. The consortium was formed in 1938 to build the Handley Page Hampden for use in the Royal Air Force with Fairchild mainly contracted to build the Hampden's tail. When the Second World War broke out, Fairchild undertook a massive expansion of their factory to over 600,000 sq ft (55,000 sq m) by 1944. The workforce similarly increased from just over 1000 workers in 1939 to a maximum of 9,620 in 1944.

The wartime need for a patrol bomber led to a Canadian requirement for a bomber that Fairchild Aircraft Ltd. (Canada) of Quebec fulfilled through production of the Bristol Blenheim Mk IV as the Bristol Bolingbroke, irreverently nicknamed the "Bolly." After a small run of aircraft constructed to British specifications, as the Bolingbroke Mk I, Fairchild switched production to the Bolingbroke Mk IV with American instruments and equipment. These versions also included anti-icing boots and a dinghy. Some of these aircraft served as bombers during the Aleutians campaign, but most of the 150 served in the intended role as patrol bombers on the Atlantic coast. Another 450 were completed as the Bolingbroke Mk IVT as trainers and saw extensive use in the British Commonwealth Air Training Plan. One of the final variants was the Bolingbroke Mk IVW which was powered by two 895 kW (1,200 hp) Pratt & Whitney R-1830 Twin Wasp engines. In total, 676 Bolingbrokes were produced.

Fairchild additionally received a contract to build the Curtiss Helldiver, producing a total of 300 Helldivers, designated XSBF-l, SBF-l, SBF-3 and SBF-4E. Further wartime projects included developing a "one-off" conversion of the Fairey Battle, the Mk IIT powered by a Wright R-1830-G3B Cyclone. As a subcontractor, in 1945, Fairchild began to manufacture sections of the Vought F4U Corsair and Grumman F7F Tigercat. By VJ Day, 71 Corsair and 195 Tiger Cat components were delivered.

=== Postwar ===
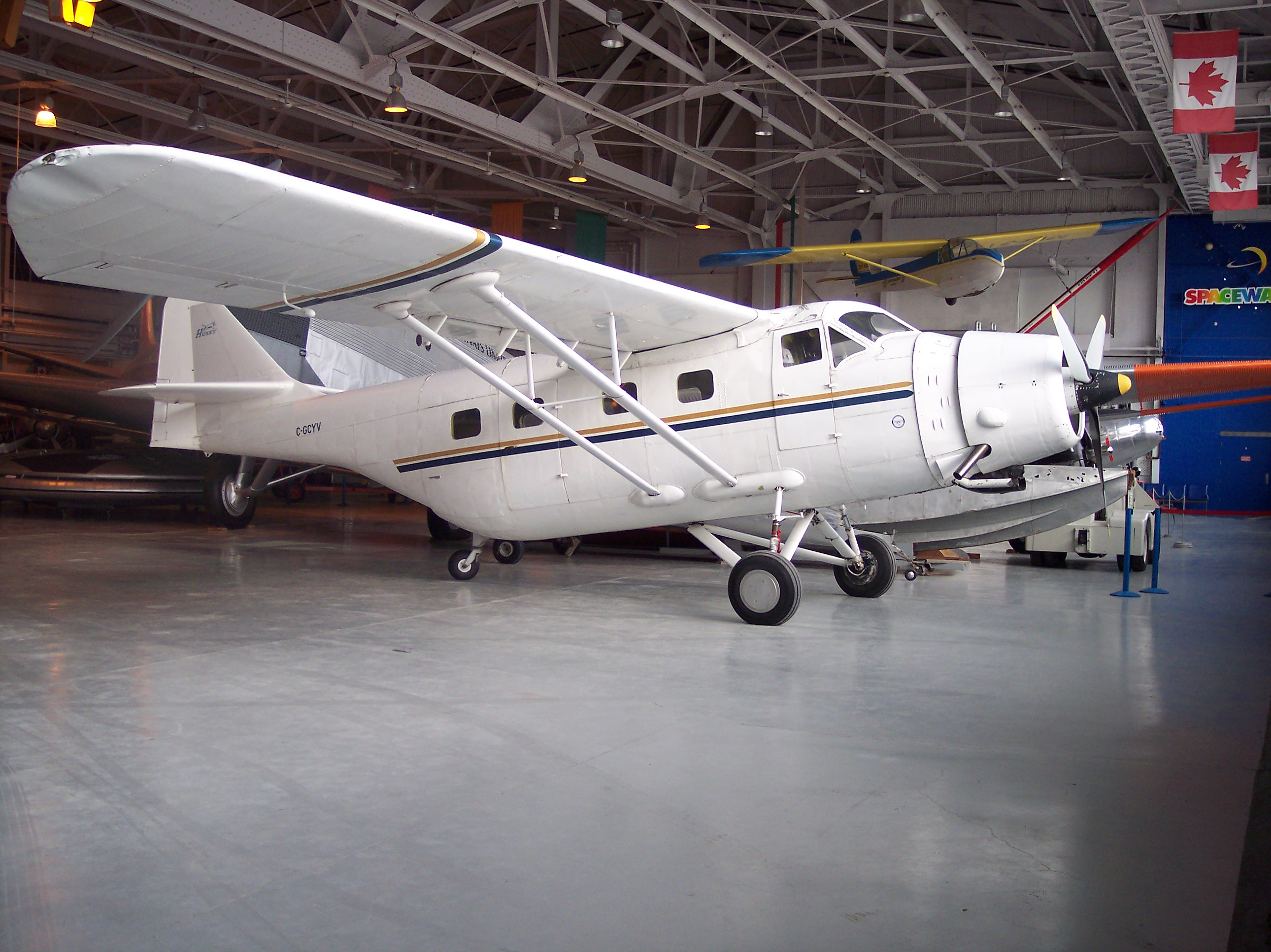
Fairchild F-11-2 on display at the Western Canada Aviation Museum, Winnipeg, Manitoba c. 2007

With the end of wartime contracts, Fairchild ventured back into familiar territory with the design and manufactures of a modern bush plane, the F-11 Husky. Under the new Fairchild Industries Ltd. banner (the subsidiary company was created in spring 1945), the Husky emerged as an interesting concept but a number of factors combined to doom the project. The Fairchild Husky was a rugged, mainly metal (wing surfaces were fabric covered aft of the front spar) transport able to haul up to eight passengers and cargo. Innovative features included a high aspect ratio wing and slotted flaps for STOL performance and a unique upswept rear fuselage with a door/ramp allowing large loads to be fitted into the fuselage. Considered underpowered, Fairchild attempted to re-engine the Husky replacing the original 450 hp Pratt & Whitney Wasp Jr with more powerful engines including a 625 hp Alvis Leonides. The company also found the number of surplus Noorduyn Norseman bush planes available at reasonable prices as well as the onset of the de Havilland Beaver made it particularly difficult to market a new bush plane. With only 12 Huskies completed, Fairchild Industries went bankrupt, forcing the eventual demise of the parent company in 1948 and the surrender of its charter in 1950.

== Products ==
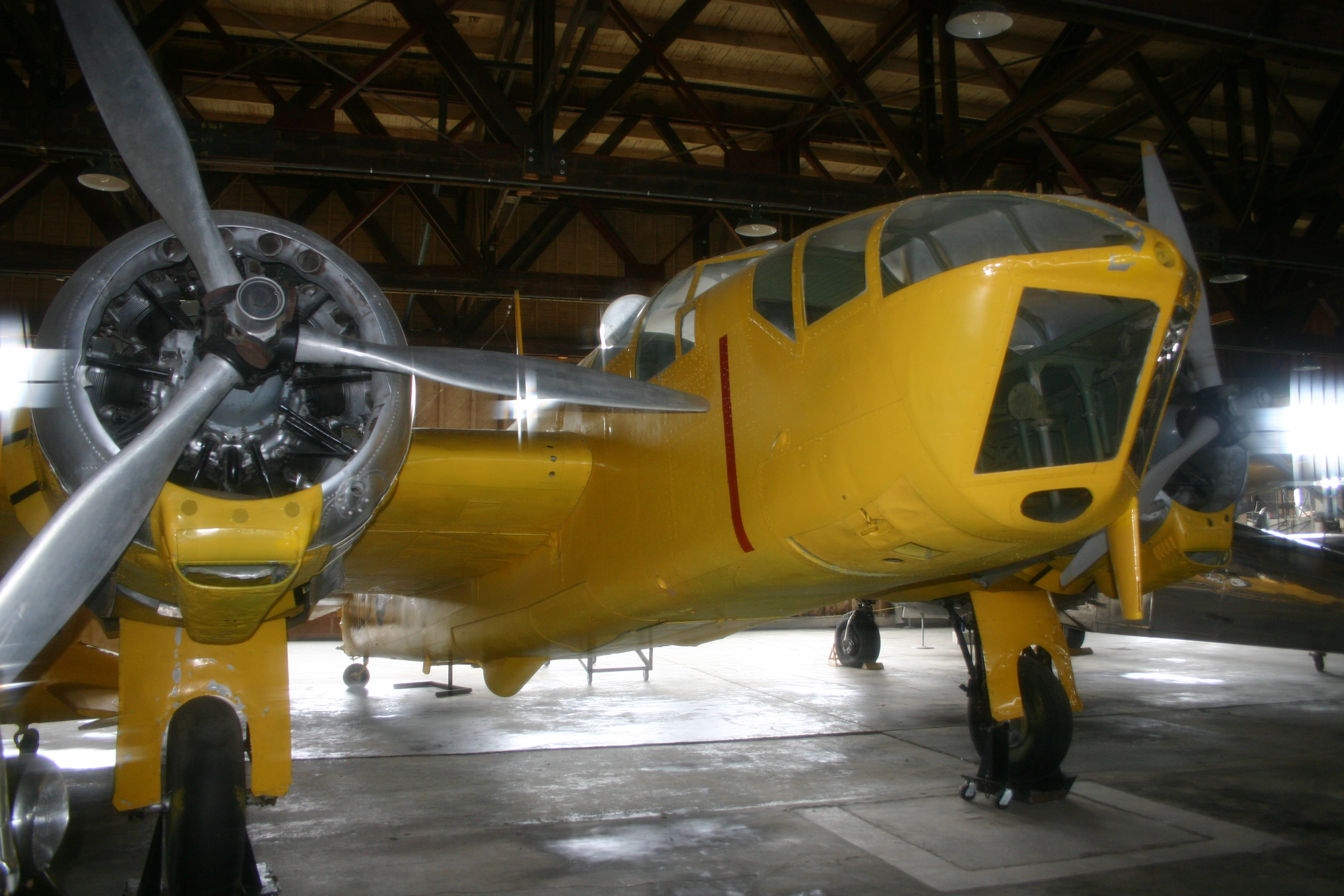
Bolingbroke IVT in the Commonwealth Air Training Plan Museum, Brandon, Manitoba

- Fairchild FC-2
- Fairchild 34-42
- Fairchild 45-80
- Fairchild 51/71
- Fairchild F-11 Husky
- Fairchild Super 71

=== Licensed production ===
- Curtiss HS-2L
- Fairchild Cornell
- Bristol Fairchild Bolingbroke
- Handley Page Hampden
- Fairchild SBF Helldiver
