= Ernie Boffa =

Canadian aviator (1904–2004)

Ernest Joseph Boffa
- Born: April 16, 1904; Piedmont, Italy
- Died: March 8, 2004 (aged 99); Los Angeles, California, U.S.
- Occupation: Bush pilot

Ernest Joseph Boffa (April 16, 1904 – March 8, 2004) was a pioneering Canadian bush pilot.

== Biography ==
Born on April 16, 1904, in Piedmont, Italy, Ernest Joseph Boffa relocated as a young child to Canada with his family, living first in Calgary and then in Thunder Bay (Fort William), Ontario. He left school in 1918 to go full-time at his job in a bicycle shop. He moved on the Canadian Car and Foundry, working as an apprentice while training in mechanical engineering and drafting through correspondence courses and night school. He took up automobile racing after his employer closed, using his mechanical skills to help him produce and maintain winning cars.

In 1927, Boffa moved to Great Falls, Montana taking up flying and aircraft repair. He earned a license to fly in the United States in 1928 and refurbished a damaged Waco 10 plane before returning to Lethbridge, Alberta. There, in 1931, he received a commercial pilots license and Canadian Engineers license, working such aviation jobs as he could find before taking a series of jobs with airlines beginning in 1937, M&C Airways, Canadian Airway and McNeal Air Services. During World War II, he was a flight instructor until 1943, when he began flying for Canadian Pacific Airways on the Yellowknife Airways, which he co-owned on a 20/80 split with Matt Berry. In 1954, he became involved with the Distant Early Warning (DEW) Line as a technical advisor. From 1956 to 1962, he was a contract pilot and, from 1962 to 1970, flew for a fishing lodge on Great Bear Lake.

Prior to working for the DEWline Ernie was a well known bush pilot flying for Associated Airways. On occasion he would stop off at any handy lake to try a little fishing. This at times caused other to think he was lost. He used to boast that others might consider him lost but he was never lost. He always knew where he was.

He died in Los Angeles, California, on March 8, 2004.

== Honours and legacy ==
- Canada's Aviation Hall of Fame (1993)
