= Laurentide Air Service Ltd. =

Canadian airline

- Type: Private
- Industry: Aviation
- Founded: 1919
- Defunct: 1925
- Area served: Quebec

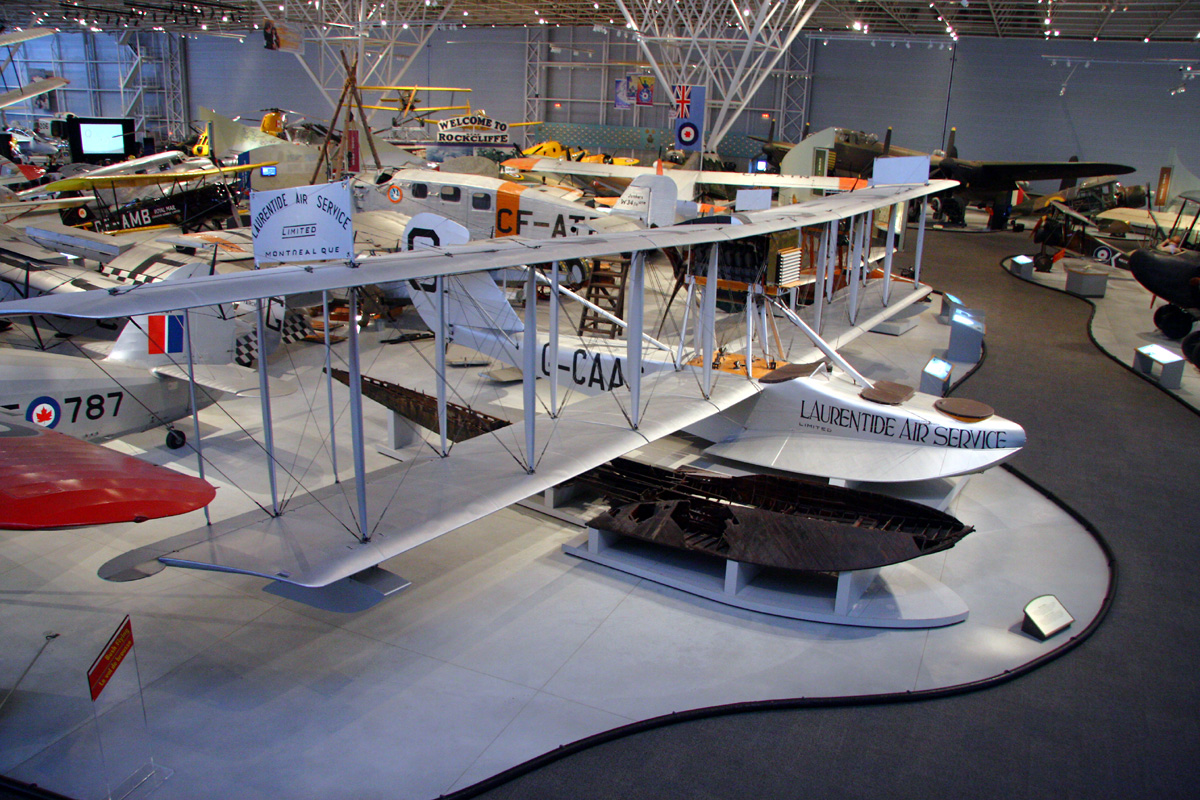
Curtiss HL of Laurentide

Laurentide Air Service or legally Laurentide Air Service Ltd. was the first scheduled Canadian airline and existed from 1919 to 1925 and was based in Quebec. Initially the bush flying began at Lac-à-la-Tortue, and Laurentide the first bush carrier. Stuart Graham was the pilot of the first reconnaissance flight for forest fire detection in Canada. The founder, Ellwood Wilson, was an employee of the Laurentide Pulp & Paper Company who saw ambition in the aviation industry and borrowed an aircraft from the government of Canada.

Laurentide operated forestry industry for aerial fire patrol, aerial survey and photography flights.

== Fleet ==
- 2x Curtiss HL
