= Milke =

Milke is a surname. Notable people with the surname include:

- Debra Milke (born 1964), German-American woman formerly convicted of murder
- George Milke (born 1954), American baseball player
- Victor Milke (born 1995), Mexican footballer
