= History of aviation in Canada =

Current and past events in Canadian aviation

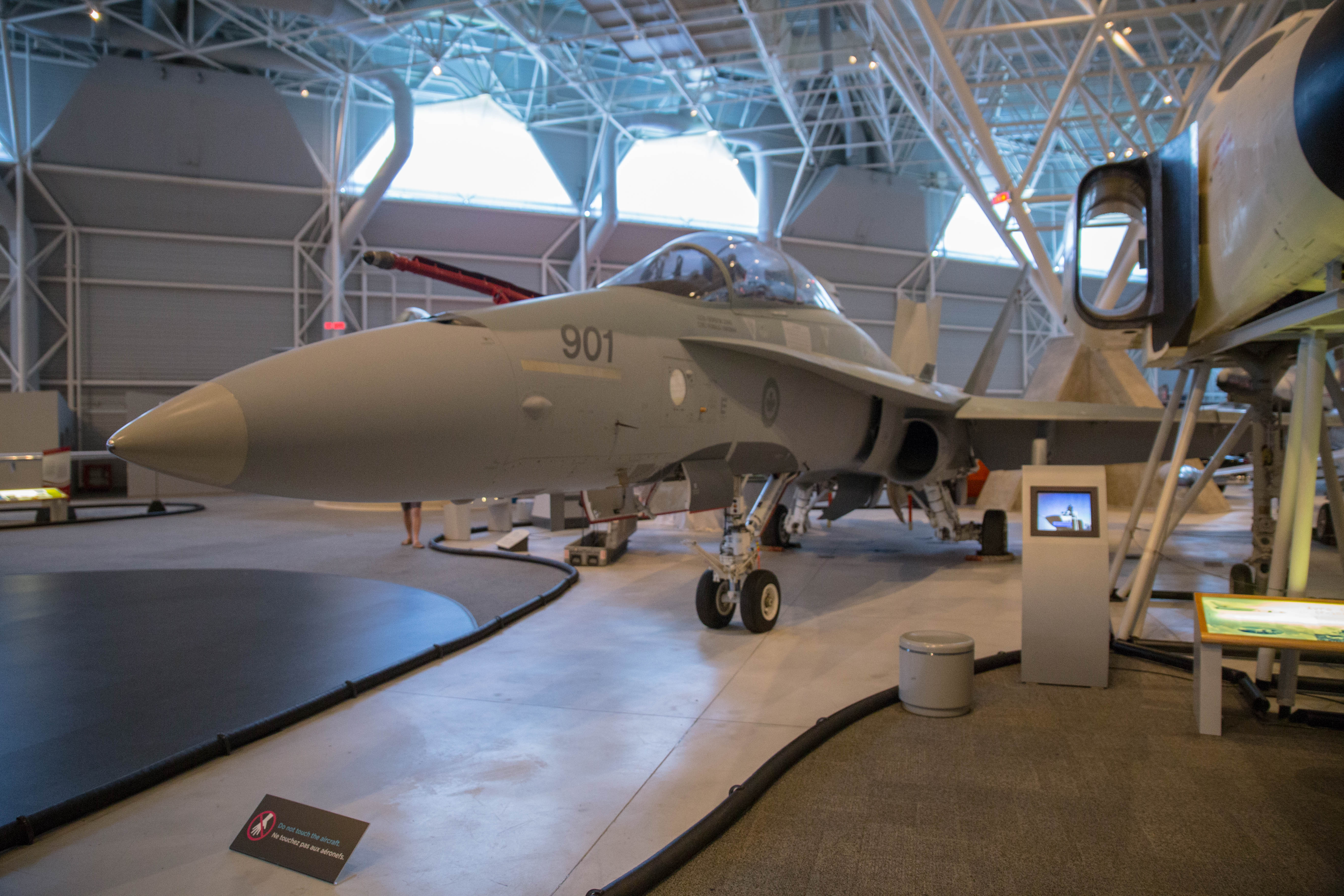
- Canada Aviation and Space Museum (35295671595)
- Country: Canada
- First flight: 1909
- Key people: John A.D. McCurdy, Billy Bishop, Elsie MacGill, Marc Garneau
- Notable events: First powered flight (1909); Founding of Air Canada (1937); Avro Arrow program (1950s)

The history of aviation in Canada began with the first manned flight in a balloon at Saint John, New Brunswick in 1840. The development of the aviation industry in Canada was shaped by the interplay of Canadian national ambitions, national and international politics, economics, and technology. Experimental aviation started in Canada with the test flights of Bell's Silver Dart in 1909, following the epochal flight of the Wright Brothers in 1903. The experimental phase gave way to use of aircraft in warfare. Many Canadians served in the British Royal Flying Corps and Royal Air Force during the First World War.

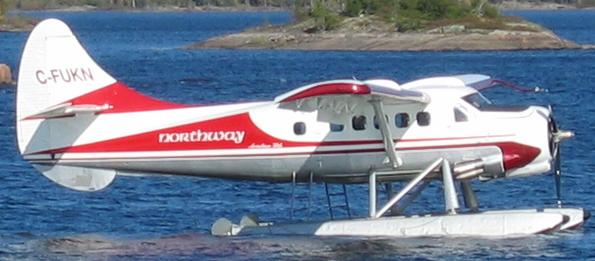
Otter floatplane in Manitoba

After the war, aircraft turned from an expensive novelty into a vital transportation tool, particularly useful in exploration and development of Canada's North. Canadians who had served with the RAF put their acquired aviation skills to peacetime use. Aviation was applied to the task of tying together far-flung communities in the North, and to gather information on the natural resources of the country. Aircraft were as important to opening up the North as the railway was to opening the West in the previous century. Between the wars many small regional airlines were founded. A lack of national transportation policy delayed the creation of a national carrier until the foundation of the government-subsidized Trans Canada Airlines ( now Air Canada) in 1937.

World War II forced more technological development and brought Canadian industry into the vanguard of aircraft manufacture. Canadian airspace and facilities provide training for more than one hundred thousand Commonwealth aircrew, and the wartime facilities supported growing commercial aviation.

The Jet Age brought air travel into the lives of many Canadians, displacing passenger rail. Deregulation of airlines with less government control brought forth new competitors to the prewar airlines. Thin operating margins and aggressive competition led to periodic booms and failures.

Today aviation is an integral part of the Canadian economy. Scheduled airline passenger service, air mail and air freight connect Canadian cities and cities around the world. General aviation provides medical evacuation, air photography, and support for resource development.

== Lighter-than-air aircraft ==
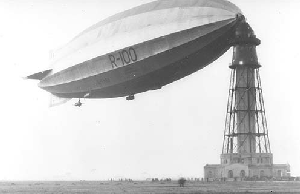
The R100 at St. Hubert, Quebec 1930

In August 1840 at Saint John, New Brunswick, Louis Anselm Lauriat became the first person to complete a balloon ascent in Canada, which he did in his balloon Star of the East.

On September 9, 1856, French aeronaut, Eugène Godard, operating a balloon called Canada (the first aircraft ever constructed in Canada), piloted the country's first successful passenger flight, carrying three passengers from Montreal to Pointe-Olivier, Quebec.

Free balloon and dirigible balloon exhibitions were popular attractions in the first years of the 20th century. The first power-driven dirigible flight in Canada was completed by C. K. Hamilton at Montreal in 1906. The British airship R100 visited Canada in August 1930, overflying both Montreal and Toronto; a mooring mast was constructed and used only for this one occasion. After the crash of the R101, British airships no longer crossed the ocean and the mooring mast was demolished in 1938.

Periodically, lighter-than-air vehicles and hybrid airships are promoted for use in remote northern areas, on the basis of lower cost of operation than conventional aircraft. While vehicles such as Skyhook and Zeppelin NT regularly obtain press coverage, no company has yet undertaken commercial cargo operations by airship in Canada.

== Experiments and exhibitions ==
=== Aerial experiments by Bell ===
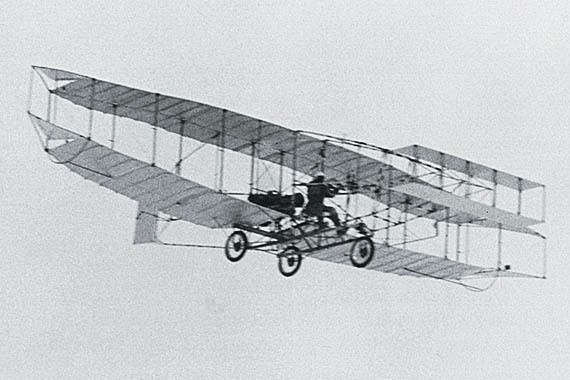
Canada's first aircraft, the AEA Silver Dart

Alexander Graham Bell had organized the Aerial Experiment Association for the development of aviation, which was funded by his wife Mabel Gardiner Hubbard from sale of some of her real estate. AEA member Frederick Walker Baldwin was the first Canadian to pilot an aircraft in 1908, although not in Canada. The first powered heavier-than-air flight in Canada occurred on Bras d'Or Lake at Baddeck, Nova Scotia on February 23, 1909, when John Alexander Douglas McCurdy piloted the AEA Silver Dart over a flight of less than 1 kilometer.

McCurdy and Baldwin in August 1909 demonstrated the Silver Dart and the Baddeck No. 1, a second aircraft built in Canada, to Canadian military authorities at Camp Petawawa. Both aircraft were damaged during the demonstrations and so did not impress the military authorities, who lost interest in using such aircraft. McCurdy later flew a record-setting over water flight from Florida nearly to Cuba in 1910. A trial flight to transport newspapers from Montreal to Ottawa in 1913 ended in a crash.

=== Other experimenters ===
Many man-carrying kites, gliders, and powered aircraft were constructed by individual private experimenters in Canada before outbreak of war. At Montreal in August 1907, Lawrence Lesh completed the first heavier-than-air flights in Canada with a towed glider. Experimenters were handicapped by limited personal financing, the high cost and short supply of suitable engines of sufficient power, and sometimes even by the lack of technical literature describing current aerodynamic theory and successful experiments.

=== Flight exhibitions ===
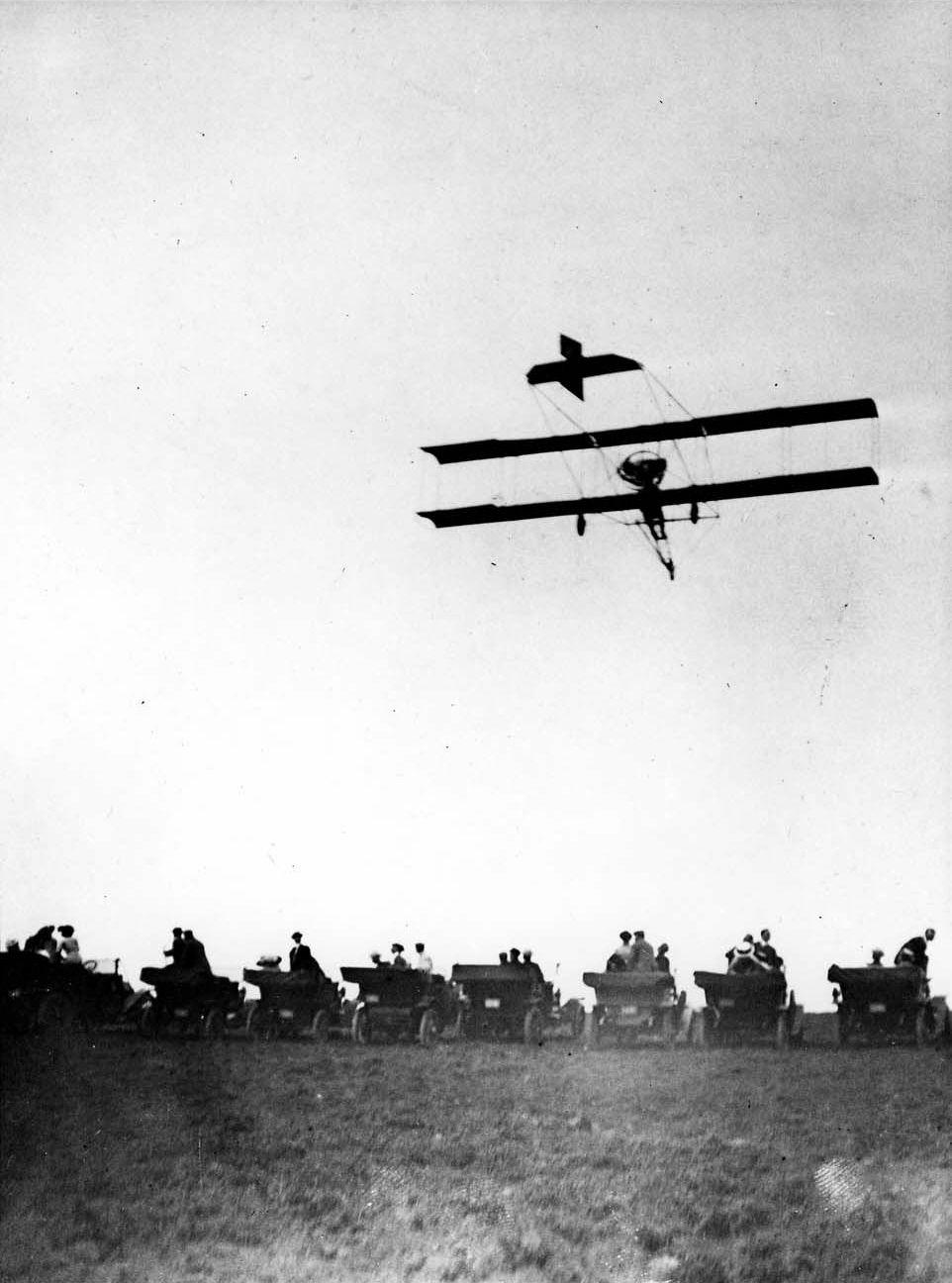
Toronto Air Meet 1911

In 1910 two large "aviation meet" exhibitions were held at Montreal and Toronto, where several Canadian aviation records were set. In October 1910, at an air exhibition near Belmont, New York, Grace Mackenzie, daughter of Sir William Mackenzie and her sisters became the first Canadian women to fly; Mackenzie soon married her pilot, Count Jacques de Lesseps. De Lesseps Field near Toronto was named for the French aviator. Aviation exhibitions were common in Canada until the outbreak of war. Generally American barnstormers participated in Canadian events such as fairs, where an exhibition of an aircraft was an attraction due to its novelty; movement of aircraft and performers across the border was virtually unregulated.

=== First fatality ===
The first aviation fatality in Canada, and the only one before the First World War was John Bryant who was killed in a crash in Victoria on 6 August 1913. Bryant was visiting British Columbia from the US with his wife Alys McKey Bryant, who was also a pilot, in their Curtiss biplane. Earlier in the trip Alys had become the first woman to pilot a plane in Canada.

== First World War ==
More than 23,000 Canadians served in British air services (Royal Flying Corps, Royal Naval Air Service and (after April 1918) the Royal Air Force) during the First World War, with more than 1,500 killed. Notable Canadian pilots include Billy Bishop, William George Barker and Alan Arnett McLeod, who were awarded the Victoria Cross. More than 180 Canadian pilots achieved the designation "ace", with five or more credited victories. Canadian aircrew served in every operational theatre during the First World War, and in roles including air-to-air combat, bombing, air photography and artillery spotting.

In 1915 the Curtiss Aeroplane and Motor Company of New York set up a small plant in Toronto for manufacture of the JN-4 training aircraft, managed by McCurdy. The Curtiss factory built 20 aircraft with pontoon float landing gear, exported to Spain; this was the first export of Canadian-built aircraft. The company was soon purchased by the Canadian government and operated as Canadian Aeroplanes Ltd. The Curtis factory was also associated with an aviation school, which graduated 129 pilots. By the end of the First World War the factory had built 2900 aircraft, including an order of 1000 JN4s, completed in three months and shipped to the United States for pilot training on their entry into the war. Aircraft construction stopped at the end of the war.

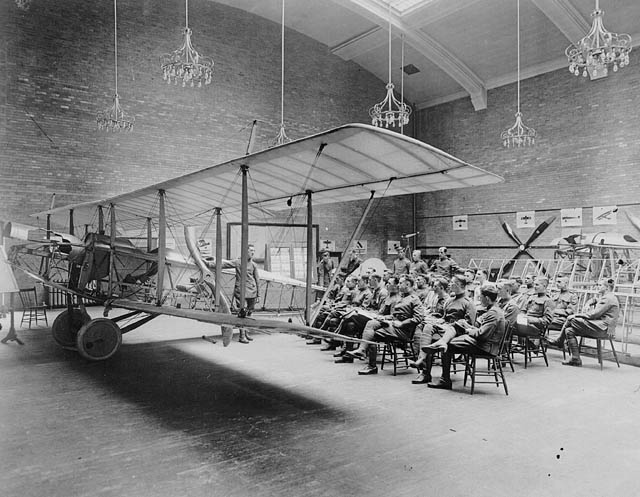
Training at the RFC school in Toronto, 1917

In spite of the many Canadians in military aviation, the Canadian government had shown little interest or ability to organize its own air force. Canadian politicians made no attempt to fund flight training, aircraft purchase, or construction of airfields. The Canadian Aviation Corps, with only three members, was founded in 1914 by Sir Sam Hughes, but was an inept and ineffective false start, never flying in combat and with its sole aircraft abandoned after a few months. A Canadian Air Force was established in 1918, but it was disbanded shortly after the end of the war. Not until 1920 was a permanent air force established. Canadians seeking flight training, aside from a few who entered schools at Toronto and Vancouver, either had to travel to enlist in French or British air forces, or received training when the RAF set up schools in Canada in 1917.

Very little civilian aviation occurred during the war, although exhibitions were given by American aviator Katherine Stinson, included an air mail delivery between Calgary and Edmonton. In eastern Canada exhibitions by Ruth Law included races against automobiles.

== Interwar period ==
After the war, Britain donated over 100 surplus aircraft to Canada. They included land and water-based aircraft. The United States also donated several surplus Curtiss HS flying boats that had been used for antisubmarine patrols. The donated aircraft were used both by the nascent air force and for civil purposes such as forest fire patrols, photographic surveying and reconnaissance. The seaplanes could use lakes and rivers instead of airstrips, making them ideal for exploring and patrolling remote regions.

Many Canadians had aviation training due to the war, and surplus aircraft were plentiful. A two-year boom in aviation followed. The first paying passenger flight in Canada occurred in 1920, between Winnipeg and The Pas. Although the total number of aviation companies, registered aircraft, and registered pilots then declined between 1920 and 1924, the freight carriage had increased greatly. Canadian aviation was slowly transforming from the experimental era to the commercial era.

Aircraft manufacture restarted in 1923, when Canadian Vickers took on a contract to build eight flying boats for the new air force, de Havilland of England started building "Moth" aircraft in 1927. The Noorduyn company founded in 1933 produced the Noorduyn Norseman which was used in bush flying operations throughout Canada; the type was adopted by the US Army Air Force during the Second World War and many units were produced. War surplus aircraft gave way to types specifically designed for civilian service. By the 1930s enclosed cabins greatly improved pilot and passenger comfort.

Although mail had been carried by air in various demonstrations throughout the early 1920s, it was not until 1927 that the Post Office started regular use of air mail.

=== Aviation regulation and a new air force ===
The Canadian Air Board was founded 1919 and had regulatory control over all civil and military aviation, merging into the Department of National Defence (DND) in 1923. The Aeronautics Act of 1919 established federal control over aviation and gave the legislative authority for air regulations.

With the merging of the Air Board with the DND in 1923, the Canadian Air Force, a non-permanent air militia, which had been formed in 1920 for pilot refresher training, took over from the Air Board and became responsible for all civil and military aviation. The CAF became "Royal" in 1924 and continued with civil flying operations and control until 1926. In that year, the Directorate of Civil Government Air Operations (CGAO) took over responsibility for all non-military aviation regulations. In 1936, the Canadian Privy Council decided that aviation was subject to Federal regulation. This later allowed the Department of Transport, as CGAO was renamed, to become the civil authority over aviation in 1936, taking over from the Department of National Defence.

In the late 1930s, the priorities of the Royal Canadian Air Force became focussed on increasing its strength as a military organization.

=== Building the airway system ===
By 1927, a system of airways crossing the country had been proposed. The plan was to provide a major airport every 100 miles, with emergency landing strips every thirty miles, across the country. Airfields were equipped with navigational and runway lighting. Navigation beacons were provided. During the Great Depression starting in 1932, many unemployed men were put to work clearing air strips with hand tools and horse-drawn machinery, as a method of providing some employment. By 1937, the airway system stretched from Vancouver to Sydney, a distance of 3108 miles.

In 1928, the Dominion Meteorological Service began providing aviation weather forecasts, but this was suspended in 1932 due to government austerity during the Depression. On initiation of Trans-Canada Air Lines, in 1936 aviation weather forecasts were once again provided, with forecasting stations at Moncton, Toronto, Kapuskasing, Winnipeg, Lethbridge and Vancouver, and intermediate weather stations. Later in the 1930s, surveying and planning took place for an airway system to reach from Edmonton into the far North.

=== Foundation of civil airlines ===
The Canadian Pacific Railway (CPR) petitioned to start air service in 1919 but initially did not get involved in aviation. By 1930, Canada was one of the few countries without a national airline.

In Western Canada, Western Canadian Airways was founded in 1926 by James Richardson. The airline specialized in northern operations, and was particularly noted for an airlift of materials and men for surveying associated with the port of Churchill in 1927. Following acquisition of some competitors, in 1930 the airline was renamed Canadian Airways. Cherry Red Airline was founded in Prince Albert, Saskatchewan in 1928 for similar purposes.

The effect of the Great Depression was severe on the Canadian civil aviation industry. The Federal government did not wish to spend money on aviation while the economy was in poor condition. R.B. Bennett was famously quoted as saying he didn't want government-funded aircraft flying over farmers whose fields were blowing away around them. Government air mail contracts were cancelled, putting small aviation companies reliant on mail into financial difficulty. Tasks such as air photography, transportation of police to northern posts, air mail, and other civil operations, briefly in the hands of the private sector, were taken up by the RCAF to make it politically acceptable to continue funding it.

The Canadian government did not have a national policy in place for development of civil aviation. With the Air Force and Government Civil Air Operations in direct competition with private companies, and with the Post Office having no greater directive than obtaining air mail service at the lowest possible cost, civil aviation developed in a hap-hazard and slow fashion. Lack of a national trans-Canada airline permitted U.S. air lines to obtain important trans-border routes. The British Imperial Airways had no Canadian operator to co-ordinate with for trans-Atlantic routes and so routes served by the US Pan Am were used to carry on transcontinental traffic from Atlantic flights. Lack of reliable air mail contracts made it impossible for private aviation companies to operate on a sound financial basis. Without airway facilities, freight, mail and passengers were being carried by foreign airlines instead of a Canadian airline. Much of this delay in development was the result of Andrew McNaughton's role as head of the Department of National Defence, where he protected Air Force operations at the expense of civil airline development.

C. D. Howe's role was critical in the founding of Trans-Canada Air Lines in 1937. Rather like the railways of the preceding century, TCA was founded as the national cross-continent carrier to keep out foreign competitors, and was made a subsidiary of CNR. See main article Air Canada#History.

CPR was a part shareholder in Canadian Airways, and by 1941 CPR purchased Canadian Airways and other regional operations to form Canadian Pacific Air Lines in 1942. TCA, the government-controlled airline, was designated as the official transcontinental and international carrier by the Mackenize King government in 1943. For nearly forty years afterward, TCA and Air Canada benefitted from government regulation of air routes, fares, and standards of service. Government regulation was thought to be essential to prevent destructive competition between TCA and Canadian Airways. The two airlines, TCA and Canadian Airlines/CP Air, would remain bitter commercial and political rivals for the rest of the 20th century.

=== Aerial photography ===
Aerial photography was an urgent task for mapping remote regions of the country. War-surplus aircraft donated to Canada by the British and United States governments, or purchased by new private aviation companies, were the foundation of aerial survey and air photography in Canada. During the interwar period extensive air mapping was carried out by the RCAF. Mapping of remote regions from the air was valuable in developing forestry and mining resources in Canada's North. The operational experience gained during this time was a foundation of Commonwealth Air Training Program during World War II.

=== International aviation ===
Worldwide commercial civil aviation expanded greatly after the First World War. Many European countries founded subsidized national airlines (Sabena, KLM, Deutsche Luft Hansa, Air France and others) for reasons of national prestige, security and commerce. The United Kingdom founded Imperial Airways with the mandate of tying together the far-flung regions of the British Empire, providing air mail and passenger services for overseas British and allied territories. In the United States, the conditions of a large land mass, uniform language and culture, large and growing population, and good flying conditions, favoured rapid growth of private airlines. Many regional airlines grew, and looked to expand traffic to Canada and Latin America. In the United States, Pan American World Airways became unofficially virtually the national flag carrier, being given preferential support by the American government in its negotiations with other governments.

Conditions in Canada were different from those in Europe and US. Inter-city operations were not the most important aviation sector in the 1920s. Float aircraft, operating on northern lakes and rivers, had become the basis of much commercial aviation for mining, paper industry, medical, police and mail carriage, so many private carriers formed regional airlines to serve this business. Little investment in fixed air strips was required for floatplane operations. About the only government subsidy available was the contract to carry air mail; however, by the onset of the Great Depression, even these mail contracts were canceled, bringing some airlines to the brink of bankruptcy. While Imperial Airways negotiated with Pan Am on the potentially lucrative and prestigious trans-Atlantic route, Canadian interests were at risk. A trans-Atlantic route that bypassed Canadian territory would greatly impede commercial aviation development in Canada. No national airline existed, and none of the regional airlines was able to negotiate with Imperial Airways for trans-Atlantic routes. One route, feasible with the aircraft of the time, would run from New York to Newfoundland to Ireland to London, bypassing Canadian territory completely.

International aviation treaties were negotiated, mostly among European countries, after the end of WW I. The Air Navigation Convention signed by European countries in 1920 was an attempt to provide international rules for air traffic. Canada was only weakly represented at negotiations, but obtained an amendment to one article of the convention that would permit Canada and the US to make their own agreements on cross-boundary air regulations; in the event, the United States Senate never ratified the convention and so the Americans never became a party to it.

One side-effect of Canadian participation in international air regulations was the establishment of the International Civil Aviation Organization (ICAO) headquarters at Montreal.

=== Trans-Canada flights ===
Although Alcock and Brown had flown over the North Atlantic in 1919, the first non-stop trans-Canada flight from Halifax to Vancouver was only in 1949. A cross-Canada air mail demonstration by the Canadian Air Force was staged in 1920, but this was a relay of a half-dozen aircraft. American aviator James Dalzell McKee (1893–1927) and RCAF Squadron Leader Earl Godfrey took nine days in September 1926 to fly from Montreal to Vancouver. McKee donated funds for the Trans-Canada Trophy in 1927 to recognize accomplishment in Canadian aviation. McKee was killed in a floatplane crash.

=== Opening the North ===
An aircraft could traverse and photograph in hours rugged undeveloped country that would take weeks to cross by canoe, dog team, horseback, or on foot. Resource companies thrived with the ability to move personnel and material year round. Particularly important was winter flying, in conditions so cold that oil had to be drained from engines and kept indoors overnight, then preheated and poured back in. Skis and floats were as useful as wheels for northern fliers. These flights were made under the most primitive of conditions, often with no prepared airfields, no reliable weather forecasts, no radio or visual navigation aids, poor maps, and often no indoor facilities for repairs. Today the Canadian Bushplane Heritage Centre museum records some of the key events of this time.

Bush flying in Canada began immediately after the First World War, using war surplus aircraft for aerial photography and forest fire patrol. The Ontario Provincial Air Service used aircraft for forest fire surveillance and transport of fire fighters, and developed the water bomber for fire fighting. The bush pilot era produced such notable pilots as Wop May and Punch Dickins. In January 1929 Wop May's flight from Edmonton to Fort Vermilion, Alberta carrying diphtheria vaccine became a headline news story. Both May and Dickins, along with many other bushplane aviators, became founders of Canadian aviation businesses.

Fred J. Stevenson barnstormed after the war, and flew in Manitoba and Northern Ontario. In 1927 he joined Richardson's Western Canada Airways and airlifted 14 men and 17,000 pounds (7,700 kg) of material in support of exploration at Fort Churchill. These flights were proof of the utility of aircraft in the North. He was killed in an air crash.

== Second World War ==
The British Commonwealth Air Training Plan in Canada trained over 130,000 aircrew during the Second World War. Some of the facilities built for BCATP were used after the war in extending and improving civilian aviation.

Canadian factories, far from the dangers of enemy attack, manufactured both training and combat aircraft. Since shipborne delivery was slow and vulnerable to attack, complete aircraft were flown in stages across a North Atlantic route to the European theatre of operations. Initial operations were organized by Canadian Pacific Air Lines, and the initial service was taken over by the RAF to become RAF Ferry Command. About 9000 aircraft were dispatched, and the operational experience gained became the basis for peacetime trans-Atlantic scheduled flights. The airport established at Gander, Newfoundland was a key element of the North Atlantic route and remains in operation.

The first women pilots were not licensed in Canada until 1928. As more men were sent off to direct combat roles, women were increasingly employed in aviation technical support roles and in aircraft manufacturing. Ferry Command and the British Air Transport Auxiliary used Canadian female pilots for trans-Atlantic movement of fighters and bombers.

In the West, the North West Staging Route was a channel for warplanes to be sent from factories in the United States to the Soviet Union. Starting in 1940, fifteen air bases and multiple emergency landing strips were prepared stretching from Great Falls, Montana through Western Canada to Alaska. The aircraft were completed in Soviet markings, winterized, and flown by stages to Alaska. There, Soviet crews would take over the aircraft and carry on through Siberia to operational areas. About 5000 fighters and 1300 bombers and transports were ferried to the Soviet Union over this route. Additionally, seven hundred aircraft were sent for air defense of Alaska against a threat from Japan, and many internal communication, supply, and search-and-rescue flights used the air route as well.

Civil aviation during the war was restricted, with priority given to travel for war business, and rationing of oil and gasoline. However, Northern bush plane operations in support of mining carried on, with such tasks as the export of uranium concentrate for the atomic bomb project.

== Aircraft manufacturing ==
The Curtiss company established a branch plant for manufacture of engines and airframes in 1915; this was taken over by the federal government and operated as Victory Aircraft until 1945, when it was sold to Hawker Siddeley.

Many aircraft made in Canada during the Second World War were licensed designs from British or American manufacturers, in some cases altered for available materials, engines, and production facilities.

During the Second World War, companies such as Canadian Car and Foundry, not ordinarily in the aviation field, turned their production lines to the manufacture of fighters and bombers. About 16,000 aircraft were manufactured in Canada, including about 450 four-engine Avro Lancaster bombers and 1400 Hawker Hurricane fighters, as well as many training aircraft such as the Harvard, Anson, and Tiger Moth.

Aviation manufacturers in Canada included:

- Canadian Vickers 1923-1944
- Fairchild Aircraft Ltd. 1920-1950
- Fleet Aircraft 1928-1957
- Canadair 1944-1986
- Bristol Aerospace 1930-1996 founded as McDonald Brothers
- Avro Canada 1945-1962
- de Havilland Canada 1928-1986
- Viking Air - 1970–present
- Bombardier Aerospace 1986–present, bought the remains of Canadair, later added Short Brothers, Lear, and de Havilland Canada.
- Magellan Aerospace 1996–present

== Rotary wing aircraft ==
The first rotary-wing aircraft registered in Canada was a Pitcairn PCA-2 gyroplane in 1931. A later Pitcairn gyroplane model PAA-1 was registered in 1932 and for about 20 years operated in a variety of roles including barnstorming, agricultural and forestry spraying, and photography. Helicopters attracted interest from Canadian amateur experimenters ( the Froebe helicopter ) during the 1930s, but no commercial development followed.

During the Second World War, the Sikorsky R-4 went into serial production, with units used by the US Navy, US Coast Guard, and British Royal Navy. Seven Canadians underwent training on the R-4. Military applications for the helicopter included anti-submarine warfare, and search and rescue. On May 11, 1945, Canadian R-4 pilot Lt. Cdr. Dennis Foley participated in the successful recovery of a downed Corsair pilot.

A helicopter was used in 1944 in a search and rescue operation on the St. Lawrence River. An American Sikorsky R-4 was dispatched for the search, but the survivors were recovered by icebreaker. In 1945, another US R-4 was sent to transport survivors of a Canso crash in Labrador. US Coast Guard helicopters were again called for rescue service in September 1946, to recover the survivors of a crashed Sabena DC-4 that had impacted 30 miles southwest of the Gander airport.

The RCAF acquired its first helicopter, a Sikorsky S-51, in 1947. Further helicopters were acquired by the RCAF and RCN and used for search and rescue. Many flights were carried out during the 1950 Red River flood for passengers and air photography. In 1955, helicopters of the RCAF No. 108 squadron were used in support of construction of the Mid Canada Line of radar stations.

== Cold War era ==
During the 1950s and 1960s, United States defence planning viewed Soviet aircraft travelling over the Arctic as a threat, and expended much effort and money on defensive systems. Early-warning radar stations of the DEW line and Pinetree Line constructed partly within the Canadian North; construction of these stations required many air freight shipments in isolated areas. Additionally, anti-aircraft missiles called BOMARC were also stationed in Canada. These were highly controversial since they had the capability of carrying a nuclear bomb.

Around 1953 Canada began development of its own supersonic interceptor aircraft, the Avro Canada CF-105 Arrow. The test aircraft achieved supersonic flight in 1958, but the nature of the threat changed from over-the-Pole manned aircraft to ballistic missiles. Many interceptor aircraft programs of the period were cancelled. Since Canada and the United States had signed a joint NORAD treaty in 1958, the BOMARC system was considered to address the bomber threat. With no export sales in prospect, the government of the time decided the defence budget could not support both missile operations and aircraft development, and the Arrow program was cancelled early in 1959. The loss of the Arrow project lead to the closing of Avro Canada and the loss of many aerospace workers.

In 1978 Judy Cameron became the first female pilot hired to fly for a major Canadian carrier (Air Canada).

== Airline regulation ==
Passenger airlines were closely regulated in Canada from the 1930s until the late 1970s. Regulations controlled which companies could participate as regional or national carriers, and the routes, schedules, and fares charged were approved by the government. Trans-Canada Airlines was given governmental preference for routes and international traffic. Deregulation of airlines in the United States, along with continuing requests by CP Air and Wardair to provide national service, were among the factors that lead to changes in the regulations. These included the "Air Canada Act" of 1977, which turned the national airline into a Crown corporation on virtually an equal competitive footing with other Canadian airlines. By 1988 Air Canada had become fully privatized.

The National Airports Policy of 1994 turned over control of 90 airports to local organizations. Additionally, air navigation services were sold in 1996 to Nav Canada, a private organization.

== Centennial celebration ==
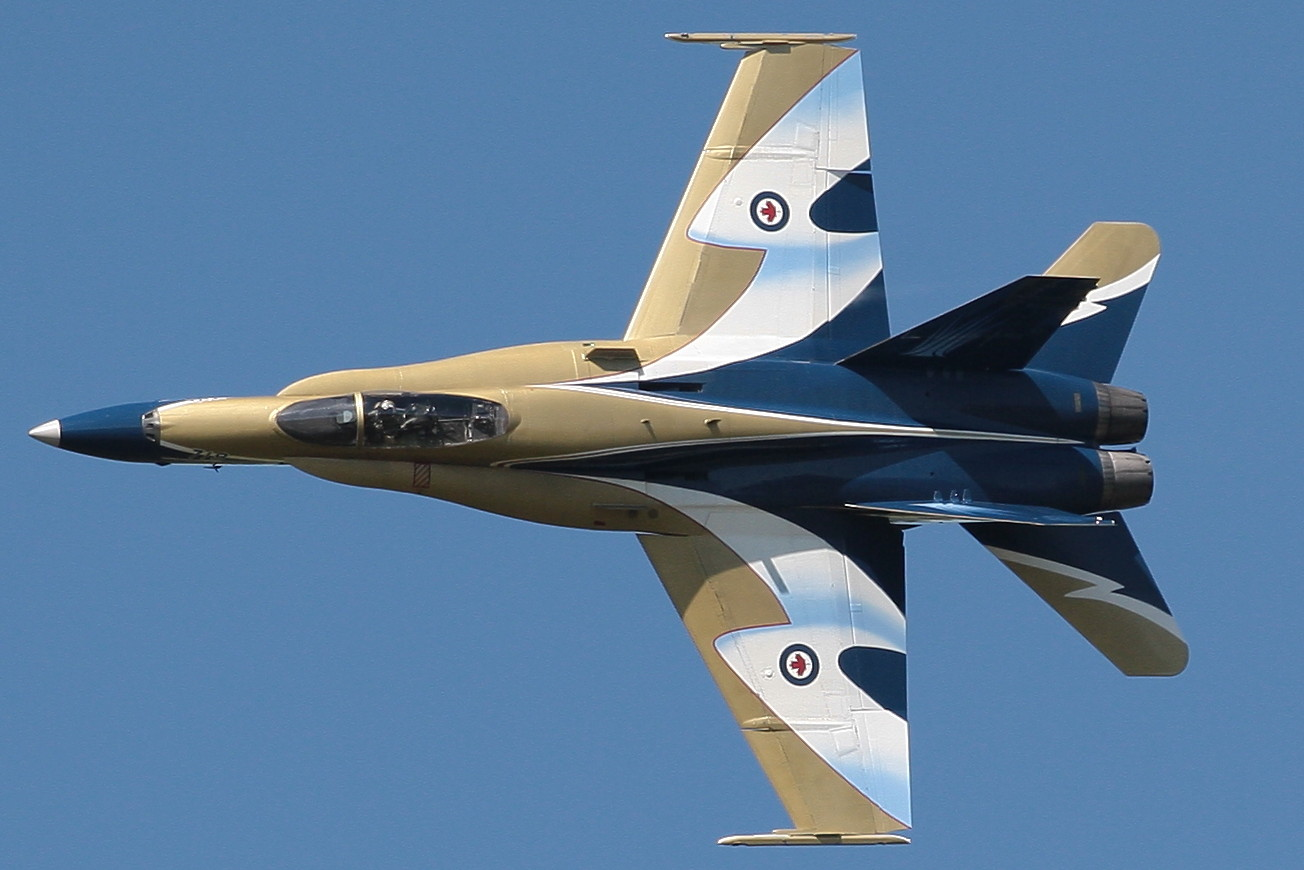
2009 Demonstration Hornet

In 2009, commemorations of the 100th anniversary of powered flight in Canada were wide spread. Part of the contribution of the Canadian military was to paint the 2009 Demonstration McDonnell Douglas CF-18 Hornet in a dark blue and gold paint scheme which included the names of the 100 most influential people in Canadian aviation history.

== See also ==
- Air Canada
- Avro Canada C102 Jetliner
- Avro Canada CF-100 Canuck
- Bombardier Aerospace and Embraer S.A. government subsidy controversy
- Canada's Aviation Hall of Fame
- Canadian Airlines
- List of defunct airlines of Canada
- List of defunct airports in Canada
- Operation Yellow Ribbon
- Pacific Western Airlines
- Transair (Canada)
- Western Canada Aviation Museum
- Ontario Provincial Air Service
