= Carl Agar =

Royal Canadian Air Force officer

- Born: Carlyle Clare Agar; November 28, 1901; Lion's Head, Ontario, Canada
- Died: January 27, 1968 (aged 66); Victoria, British Columbia, Canada

Carlyle Clare Agar AFC (November 28, 1901 – January 27, 1968) was a pioneering Canadian aviator.

== Early years ==
Agar was born on November 28, 1901, at Lion's Head, Ontario, and moved to Edmonton, Alberta in 1905 where he was educated. He farmed on the outskirts of the city until 1928, when he learned to fly under the tutelage of Moss Burbidge at the Edmonton Aero Club. He earned his private pilot's licence the following year and in 1932 accepted a position with the Department of Indian Affairs as an agricultural instructor at Wabamum, Alberta. Two years later, he returned to full-time farming.

== Second World War ==
At the outbreak of the Second World War, he attempted enlistment in the Royal Canadian Air Force as a pilot but was rejected for being overage. In 1940 he reapplied to the RCAF, was accepted for pilot training and posted to Moose Jaw, Saskatchewan, and Trenton, Ontario, from where he graduated as an instructor. He was stationed at Edmonton and High River, Alberta and Abbotsford, British Columbia, until 1944 and was awarded the Air Force Cross for outstanding contributions as a flight instructor. He was discharged from the RCAF in 1945 when he received the maximum age for aircrew.

== Post-War ==
At Penticton, British Columbia, he formed the South Okanagan Flying Club in partnership with two ex-RCAF members. A lack of commercial flying business forced them into reassessing their position, so they moved to Kelowna and formed Okanagan Air Service. Their plan was to engage in instructional activities, charter flying and crop spraying, but they were again forced to reconsider their plans due to high maintenance costs. He then investigated the possibility of using the newly designed helicopter as an airborne spraying device.

The company was converted to public ownership, and in 1947 he flew the first commercial helicopter in Canada, to spray orchards with insecticides. When it became evident the operation would not support the firm, he contracted with the Government of British Columbia to spray infested forest areas. When not engaged in these economically crucial operations, he learned the secrets of helicopter flying in the high reaches of the Rocky Mountains, and perfected new skills and operational techniques.

When the government's topographical department needed a special survey of the Wahleach Mountain area, he was prepared. The operation was a complete success and his techniques for high altitude landings and takeoffs from hitherto inaccessible locations, became the accepted worldwide standard.

Having conquered the altitude barrier, he then proved the effectiveness of contour flying for timber operations, and followed this successful gambit by transporting prospecting parties to and from remote bush areas. He accepted a contract from the Water Board of Vancouver in 1949 to airlift 400,000 pounds of construction material, equipment and personnel to the 3,500-foot level of a mountainside and completed a dam building operation on schedule. It was the first time a helicopter had been used in such a manner, and more than 200 takeoffs and landings were required to finalize the lift. The Palisade Lake Dam stands as a monument to his mastery of vertical flight.

The international publicity accorded this outstanding achievement caused industry and the military to re-think their operational transportation methods. As a result, his Penticton-based company trained selected commercial and military pilots in mountain flying techniques. His experience was then contracted to the Aluminum Company of Canada in 1951 to assist in the construction of their giant smelter complex at Kitimat. His firm went on to become one of the largest commercial helicopters operations in the world.

== Honours and legacy ==
- Trans-Canada (McKee) Trophy (1950)
- Captain William J. Kossler Trophy, American Helicopter Society (1955)
- Canada's Aviation Hall of Fame (1974)
