= Canadian Aerodrome Company =

Aircraft manufacturer

- Type: Private
- Industry: Aviation
- Predecessor: Aerial Experiment Association
- Headquarters: Baddeck, Nova Scotia, Canada
- Area served: Canada
- Key people: Frederick W. "Casey" Baldwin; J.A.D. McCurdy
- Products: Aircraft
- Owner: Casey Baldwin; J.A.D. McCurdy

The Canadian Aerodrome Company was the first commercial enterprise in the British Empire to design and manufacture aircraft. The company was formed following the dissolution of Alexander Graham Bell's Aerial Experiment Association. The company was established by Frederick W. "Casey" Baldwin and J.A.D. McCurdy in 1909, with the financial backing of Alexander Graham Bell. The company was headquartered in Baddeck, Nova Scotia at the Kite House at Bell's Beinn Bhreagh estate.

The Canadian Aerodrome Company manufactured aircraft based on the AEA Silver Dart, producing the Baddeck No. 1, and the Baddeck No. 2 as well as a separate commissioned design, the Hubbard Monoplane (Hubbard II) before the company was dissolved in 1910. (Note: The Bell Oionus I triplane was also designed and constructed by the team of Baldwin and McCurdy at the Bell Experimental Laboratory under a separate arrangement with Bell, who hired them to design and construct the last of his aviation designs, a mix of tetrahedral kite and aircraft, prior to the formation of the Canadian Aerodrome Company.)
