= Frank Archibald MacDougall =

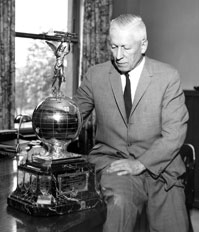
- MacDougall with the McKee Trophy, 1964
- Born: 16 June 1896; Toronto, Ontario, Canada
- Died: 27 June 1975 (aged 79); Toronto, Ontario, Canada
- Occupation: Forest ranger

Frank Archibald MacDougall (16 June 1896 – 27 June 1975) was a Canadian pioneering forest ranger in Ontario, Canada. Known as the "flying Superintendent of Algonquin Park", he was important in the development of the park system in the province and for the use of airplanes in forestry.

== Early life ==
Of Loyalist descent, MacDougall was born on 16 June 1896 in Toronto, Ontario. He was raised in Carleton Place, Ontario, where he was active in sports, becoming an expert canoeist as a member of the Carleton Place Canadian championship war canoe team for 1/2 mile in 1913 and 1/2 and one mile in 1914.

After a year in the 42nd regiment as a student, he enlisted in the Canadian Expeditionary Force on 17 September 1915 and arrived in England on 14 February 1916. He fought in the Battle of Vimy Ridge in the 3rd Battalion of the 1st Canadian Division. On 6 September 1917, he was admitted to hospital suffering from the effects of a gas attack, returning to duty on the 16th in time to join the Battle of Passchendaele. He returned to Canada and was demobilized on 16 June 1919. On medical advice due to the gassing, he decided to pursue an outdoor career, and entered Forestry at the University of Toronto.

While working in the James Bay survey in the summer of 1922, he observed the Great Fire of 1922 around Haileybury.

Upon graduation in 1923 (B.Sc.F.), he immediately entered the Ontario Department of Lands and Forests and was assigned as Assistant District Forester in Algonquin District, which includes the Algonquin Provincial Park, Ontario.

MacDougall died on 27 June 1975 in Toronto.

== Career ==
It was in the Department that MacDougall saw the value of aircraft for forest protection and patrol and took the opportunity of becoming a pilot, eventually achieving an instrument rating and the equivalent of a commercial pilot's license. He later moved to Sault Ste. Marie as Forester Inspector and then in 1926 was appointed District Forester. In 1931 he was assigned as Superintendent of Algonquin Park, and District Forester of the Algonquin area. From his first days in Algonquin Park he was provided with his own plane, a Fairchild KR-34 open cockpit biplane, together with a mechanic and maintenance personnel. That airplane is now in the Canadian Bushplane Heritage Centre.

The open airplane was used for patrol purposes on floats in the summer and skis in the winter. For the latter MacDougall had fur lined pants up to his armpits, fur lined boots, fur lined helmet, fur trimmed goggles and his mitts were also fur lined up to his elbows. He would return from a winter trip in this gear shivering with cold but the poaching trade took a sharp decline. Around 1939 he finally acquired a closed cabin airplane, the Stinson Reliant SR-10, and this served for many years until, during a routine maintenance, serious corrosion problems were discovered and the plane had to be retired.

MacDougall was an accomplished amateur musician, who also made violins as a hobby. He added a woodworking corner to his Park office where he made violins in his spare time. He used his knowledge of woods to good effect and scoured the country looking for scraps of old, fine grained woods which he then traded with professional violin makers for tools and advice. He made over 6 violins which were presented to friends, several of whom were professional players, who appreciated his quality of sound. One is still in the family.

In 1941 MacDougall was promoted to the highest non-elected position in the Civil Service when he became Deputy Minister of Lands and Forests, stationed in Toronto. It was in that position that he assisted with the writing of a design proposal for a bush plane using his own experiences and that of the Provincial Air Service pilots for the specification. The department promised orders for 20 planes as an incentive. DeHavilland aircraft of Canada secured the contract for the Beaver aircraft which became the world standard in performance for bush planes .

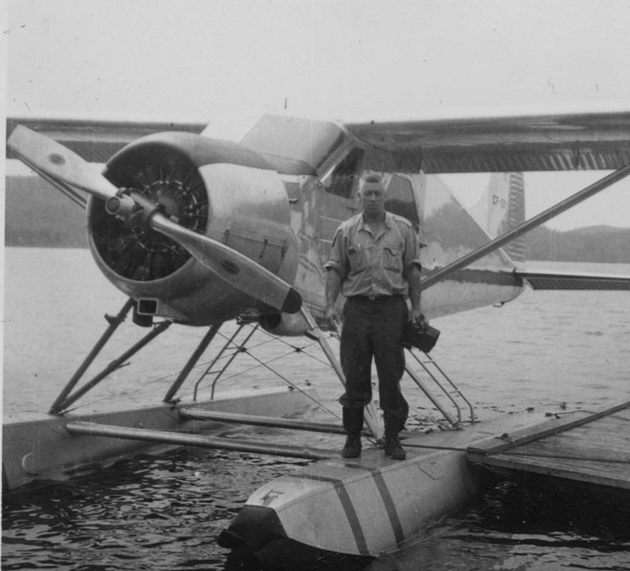
MacDougall with DeHavilland Beaver

MacDougall's department was one of the earliest to develop the use of airplanes for fire detection and the water bombing of forest fires. For his work in forest protection and the development of the Beaver he was awarded the McKee Trophy, Canada's highest aviation award.

MacDougall had the use of the first production Beaver and then subsequent Beavers headquartered during the summers in Toronto and flew them during inspection trips from Toronto until his retirement in 1966.

== Family ==
MacDougall was first married to Pearl Nugent (1885–1946) from whom he had three children, two of whom survived into adulthood and second married to Merren Murray (–1983) from whom he had a daughter.

== Lists of honors and awards ==
- Carleton Place Canoe Club; war canoe champions 1/2 mile, 1913; 1/2 and 1 mile, 1914
- British War Medal and Victory Medal
- Awarded the McKee Trans-Canada Trophy in 1964
- Companion of the Order of Flight, Alberta, 1973
- Inducted as a Member into Canada's Aviation Hall of Fame 31 December 1973
- Named to the Brotherhood of the Silver Wings of the Northwest Territories, 1974
- Highway 60 in Algonquin Park, between the east and west gates, designated as The Frank MacDougall Parkway, August 6, 1976,

After his death a memorial fellowship was established at the University of Toronto, the Frank A. MacDougall Fellowship; value up to approximately C$2,195 annually.
