= Edmonton Flying Club =

The Edmonton Flying Club, home of the Edmonton Flight College, is a flying club and flight school located just west of Edmonton, Alberta, Canada. It operates from Parkland Airport in Parkland County. It is the oldest operating flight school in Canada and was founded in 1927 as the Edmonton and Northern Alberta Aero Club. The club's first president was Canadian World War I flying ace, Wilfrid R. "Wop" May. At the time, the purpose of the club was to promote aviation and to provide flight training. Today, the Edmonton Flying Club is a member-owned organization that operates a diverse fleet of aircraft and provides flight training at all levels.

== Courses offered ==
The Edmonton Flying Club offers courses for the following licenses and ratings:

- Recreational Pilot Permit
- Private Pilot License
- Commercial Pilot License
- Night Rating
- Instrument Flight Rules Rating
- VFR Over The Top Rating
- Single and Multi Engine Instrument Rating
- Multi Engine Instrument Rating
- Instructor Rating

== Fleet ==
As of June 1, 2016 Edmonton Flying Club has six aircraft listed at their web site and seven registered with Transport Canada:

Edmonton Flying Club Fleet
Aircraft	EFC aircraft	TC aircraft	Variants	Notes
Cessna 172	5	5	172S	Single-engine, fixed tricycle gear.
Piper PA-44 Seminole	0	1	180		Twin engine

In addition, the EFC has a state-of-the-art Modular Flight Deck simulator.

== Notable pilots associated with EFC ==
- Carlyle Clare Agar, learned to fly at the Edmonton Aero Club and was awarded the Air Force Cross for outstanding contributions as a flight instructor during World War II
- Maurice "Moss" Burbidge, pioneering Canadian aviator, taught Agar to fly
