= Hubbard Monoplane =

1910 Canadian early aircraft

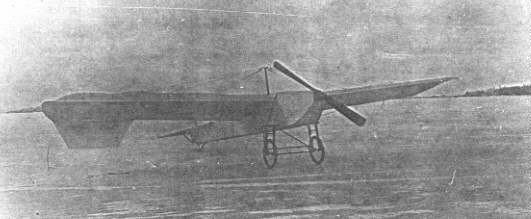
- The Hubbard Monoplane on the Baddeck Bay in 1910

General information
- Type: Private use
- Manufacturer: Canadian Aerodrome Company
- Designer: John McCurdy
- Primary user: Gardiner Greene Hubbard II
- Number built: 1

History
- Manufactured: 1910
- First flight: 3 March 1910

The Hubbard Monoplane (Hubbard II), also nicknamed "Mike", was an early aircraft designed by John McCurdy and built by the Canadian Aerodrome Company.

The Hubbard Monoplane was commissioned by Gardiner Greene Hubbard II of Boston. (Note: Gardiner Greene Hubbard II was a pioneering pilot and the nephew of lawyer Gardiner Greene Hubbard, Alexander Graham Bell's father in law and legal advisor.) The monoplane was constructed at the Beinn Bhreagh estate of Alexander Graham Bell in Baddeck, Nova Scotia, by John McCurdy and F. W. "Casey" Baldwin. The aircraft was the third to be built by the Canadian Aerodrome Company, and the first to represent an indigenous design, although loosely based on the Blériot XI. The aircraft made two brief flights on 3 March 1910, flown by McCurdy.

After it was shipped to Montreal for the 1910 Montreal Air Meet, Hubbard was unsuccessful in flying the aircraft, it possibly being too low-powered to do more than taxiing. Shortly after, Hubbard had the aircraft dismantled and shipped to Boston, making it the first Canadian aircraft sold and built for export. The intent was to enter the aircraft at the Harvard-Boston Aero Meet in Boston. The aircraft was displayed at the aero meet, and was included in the photographs of the flight line, but it did not leave the ground.

== Specifications (Baddeck No. 2) ==
Data from Canadian Aircraft Since 1909

General characteristics

- Crew: one
- Length: 32 ft (9.8 m)
- Wingspan: 33 ft 11 in (10.34 m)
- Height: 7 ft 6 in (2.29 m)
- Wing area: 220 sq ft (20 m^{2})
- Max takeoff weight: 1,000 lb (454 kg)
- Powerplant: 1 × Kirkham 40 hp air-cooled piston engine, 40 hp (30 kW)

Performance
