= William Archibald =

William Archibald may refer to:

- William Archibald (politician) (1852–1926), English-born Australian politician
- William Munroe Archibald (1876–1949), Canadian aviator
- William Archibald (playwright) (1917–1970), Trinidad and Tobago-born American playwright and screenwriter
