= Sault Ste. Marie Water Aerodrome =

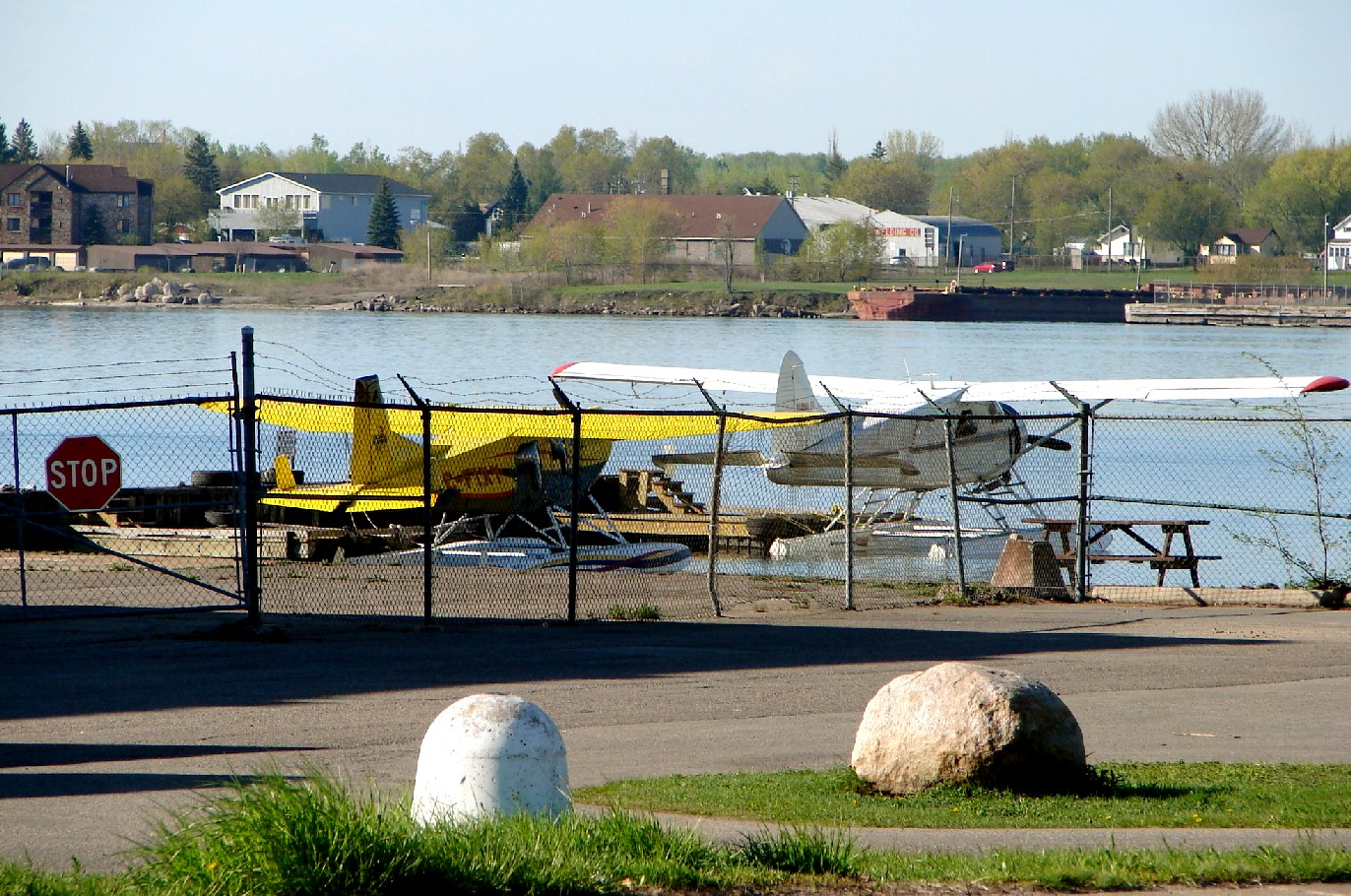
- IATA: none; ICAO: none; TC LID: CPX8

Summary
- Airport type: Public
- Operator: Canadian Bushplane Heritage Centre
- Location: Sault Ste. Marie, Ontario
- Time zone: EST (UTC−05:00)
  - Summer (DST): EDT (UTC−04:00)
- Elevation AMSL: 580 ft / 177 m
- Coordinates: 46°30′16″N 084°19′24″W
- Website: www.bushplane.com/fly-in-information

Map
- Location in Ontario CPX8 (Canada)

Runways
Direction	Length		Surface
Direction	ft	m	Surface
n/a	n/a	n/a	Water
- Source: Water Aerodrome Supplement

Sault Ste. Marie Water Aerodrome (TC LID: CPX8) is located adjacent on the St. Marys River in Sault Ste. Marie, Ontario, Canada. It shares its airspace and waterway with neighbouring Sault Ste Marie International Seaplane Base (FAA LID: MI8) in the United States.

Sault Ste Marie Water Aerodrome services the Canadian Bushplane Heritage Centre, a museum which features many interactive bush plane, forestry, and aerial firefighting exhibits. Several aircraft are also under restoration at the centre, notably a De Havilland Fox Moth with the registration C-FBNI.

== See also ==
- List of airports in the Sault Ste. Marie, Ontario area
- Media related to Sault Ste. Marie Water Aerodrome at Wikimedia Commons
