= AEA Silver Dart =

Experimental aircraft

Coordinates: 46.1184°N 60.7169°W

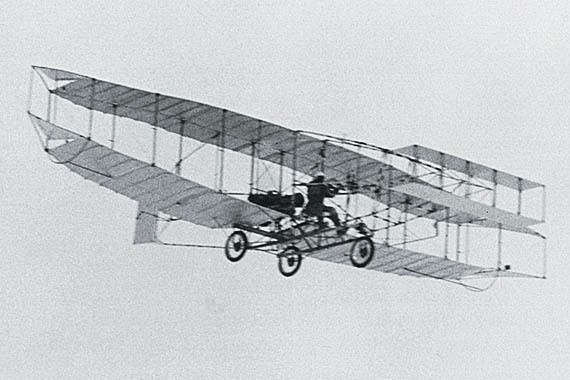
- The AEA Silver Dart in flight.

General information
- Type: Pioneer Era aircraft
- Manufacturer: Aerial Experiment Association
- Designer: John McCurdy; Frederick W. "Casey" Baldwin; Glenn Curtiss; Thomas Selfridge; Alexander Graham Bell
- Status: Destroyed in crash
- Primary user: Aerial Experiment Association
- Number built: 1

History
- Manufactured: 1908
- First flight: 23 February 1909

The Silver Dart (or Aerodrome #4) was a derivative of an early aircraft built by a Canadian/U.S. team, which after many successful flights in Hammondsport, New York, earlier in 1908, was dismantled and shipped to Baddeck, Nova Scotia. It was flown from the ice of Baddeck Bay, a sub-basin of Bras d'Or Lake, on 23 February 1909, making it the first controlled powered flight in Canada. The aircraft was piloted by one of its designers, Douglas McCurdy. The original Silver Dart was designed and built by the Aerial Experiment Association (AEA), which had been formed under the guidance of Dr. Alexander Graham Bell.

From 1891, Bell had begun experiments at Baddeck and Hammondsport to develop motor-powered heavier-than-air aircraft. By 1908, the success of the AEA was seen in a series of ground-breaking designs, culminating in the Silver Dart. By the time the Silver Dart was constructed in late 1908, it was the Aerial Experiment Association's fourth flying machine. One of its precursors, the June Bug, had already broken records. It won the Scientific American Trophy for making the first official one mile (1609 m) flight in North America. (Note: The final AEA aircraft design, the Silver Dart, embodied all of the advancements found in the earlier designs.)

The frame and structure of the Silver Dart were made of steel tube, bamboo, friction tape, wire and wood. The wings were covered with rubberized, silvery balloon cloth provided by Capt. Thomas Scott Baldwin of Hammondsport; hence the name the "Silver Dart". Its Kirkham engine, supplied by Glenn Curtiss, was a reliable V-8 that developed 50 horsepower (37 kW) at 1,000 RPM. The propeller was carved from a solid block of wood. The aircraft had what is now called a canard or an "elevator in front" design. Like most aircraft of its day the Silver Dart had poor control characteristics; likewise, it had no brakes.

== Operational history ==
When the Silver Dart lifted off on 23 February 1909, it flew only half a mile (800 m) at an elevation from three to nine meters, and a speed of roughly 65 kilometres per hour (40 mph). The aircraft was the first powered, heavier-than-air machine to fly in Canada. Other records were soon to fall; on 10 March 1909, the Silver Dart flown again by McCurdy completed a circular course over a distance of more than 35 kilometres (22 mi). The first passenger flight in Canada was made in the Silver Dart on 2 August 1909.

The Canadian Army was unimpressed at the headway made by the group. The general impression of the time was that aircraft would never amount to much in actual warfare. Despite official scepticism, the Association was finally invited to the military base at Camp Petawawa to demonstrate the aircraft. The sandy terrain made a poor runway for an aircraft with landing wheels about 2 inches (50 mm) wide. The Silver Dart had great difficulty taking off. On its fifth flight on 2 August 1909, McCurdy wrecked the craft when one wheel struck a rise in the ground while landing. The Silver Dart never flew again.

Although a significant aircraft in Canada, the location of the initial design and construction of the Silver Dart made it an American design. Following the disbanding of the AEA, founding members, McCurdy and F.W. ("Casey") Baldwin obtained the Canadian patent rights for Aerodrome No. 4 (The Silver Dart), for the express purpose of producing a Canadian-made version. Subsequently, the Baddeck No. 1 and Baddeck No. 2 were built by the Canadian Aerodrome Company, the newly formed company that Baldwin and McCurdy established in 1909.

== Tributes ==
=== 50th Anniversary flight ===
There is a reconstruction of the Silver Dart on display at the Canada Aviation and Space Museum in Ottawa. The reconstruction was built by volunteers from the Royal Canadian Air Force between 1956 and 1958 to celebrate the 50th anniversary of the first flight. The aircraft flew over Baddeck Bay on the day of the anniversary but crashed due to high winds. A number of other scaled and full-scale replicas are found in Canadian and museum collections in other parts of the world, including examples at the Canadian Bushplane Heritage Centre in Sault Ste. Marie, the Atlantic Canada Aviation Museum, Reynolds-Alberta Museum, Canadian Warplane Heritage Museum The Canadian Aviation Museum in Windsor On. A.G.Bell Museum, Baddeck Nova Scotia, the National Air Force Museum of Canada and Aero Space Museum of Calgary.

=== 2009 Centennial celebrations ===
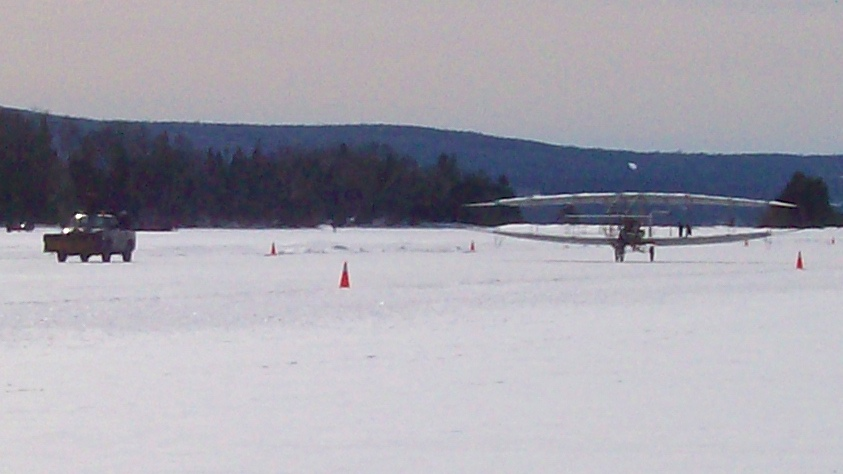
The Silver Dart replica taxies to the starting point for its commemorative flight on 22 February 2009. It was celebrating Canada's Centennial of Flight a day early, due to predicted unfavourable weather.

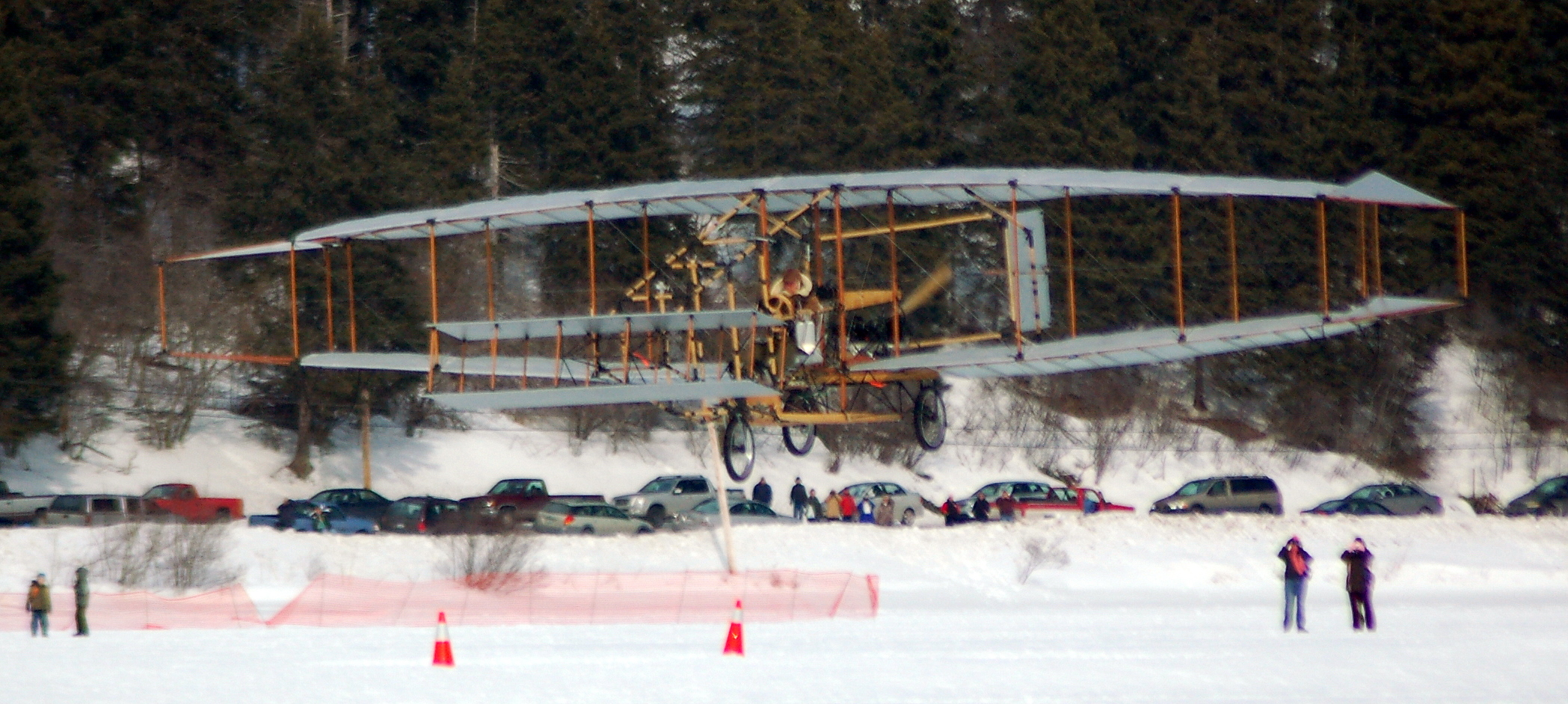
Silver Dart replica

A small group of volunteers from the not-for-profit Aerial Experiment Association 2005 Inc. completed building a flying replica of the Silver Dart in early 2009. The main goal of the group was to recreate the original flight on 23 February 2009 – again on the frozen surface of Baddeck Bay near Baddeck, Nova Scotia. However, due to weather conditions forecast for the 23rd, the centennial flight and fly-by occurred on 22 February. After a temporary repair made to the front wheel, former Canadian astronaut Bjarni Tryggvason piloted five successful flights that day. The replica is officially considered a Canadian heritage project, and throughout the year was the centerpiece of a series of events celebrating the centennial of the Silver Dart's first flight in Canada. In 2013, it was moved to the Alexander Graham Bell Museum in Baddeck, where it will be on permanent display.

Numerous other activities took place in 2009 to celebrate the Centennial of Flight, including a new exhibition entitled "Canadian Wings – A Remarkable Century of Flight" at the Canada Aviation Museum in Ottawa and a trans-Canada flight of vintage aircraft. The no longer functional official Nova Scotia Ministry of Tourism website Centennial Celebration of the Flight of the Silver Dart in Baddeck promoted the flight and anniversary activities in Baddeck throughout the centennial. Various historical photos and documents were posted on that site, in a virtual museum presentation.

=== Commemorations ===
The 824 Silver Dart Squadron of the Royal Canadian Air Cadets in St. Peter's, Nova Scotia is named in honour of the Silver Dart. Another cadet squadron, the 602 McCurdy Squadron of the Royal Canadian Air Cadets – in Florence, Nova Scotia – is named in honour of John McCurdy, the original pilot of the Silver Dart.

Physical commemorations include Silver Dart Drive, located in Mississauga, Ontario, which is a perimeter roadway within the confines of Toronto Pearson International Airport. Another Ontario commemorative site is the double ice-surface arena in CFB Petawawa, known as the Silver Dart Arena.

On the 50th anniversary of its first flight, Canada Post issued a Canadian Silver Dart stamp on 23 February 1959. During the Canadian Centenary of Flight, Canada Post honoured the Silver Dart – and the first flight in Canada – with a Canadian postage stamp released on 23 February 2009.

== Specifications (Silver Dart) ==
Data from

General characteristics

- Crew: 1
- Capacity: 2
- Length: 30 ft 0 in (9.14 m)
- Wingspan: 40 ft 1 in (12.22 m)
- Height: 9 ft 7 in (2.92 m)
- Wing area: 563 sq ft (52.3 m^{2})
- Empty weight: 320 lb (145 kg)
- Powerplant: 1 × Curtiss V-8 air-cooled piston engine originally (later changed to water-cooling by McCurdy), 50 hp (37 kW)

Performance

- Maximum speed: 40 mph (64 km/h, 35 kn)
- Range: 20 mi (32 km, 17 nmi)
