= Canadian Aerodrome Baddeck No. 1 and No. 2 =

Types of aircraft

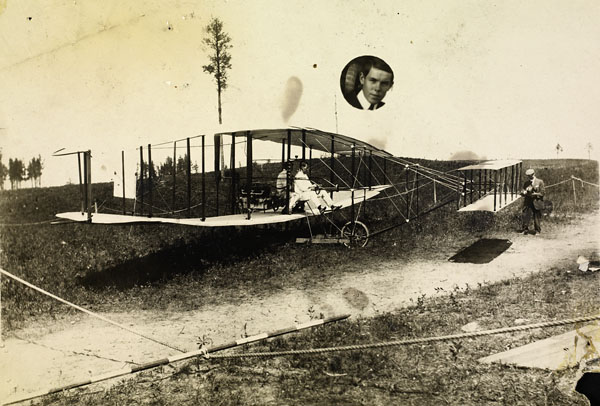
- Baddeck No. 1 with two crew members

General information
- Type: Early experimental aircraft
- Manufacturer: Canadian Aerodrome Company
- Designer: John McCurdy; Frederick W. "Casey" Baldwin
- Primary user: Canadian Aerodrome Company
- Number built: 2

History
- Manufactured: 1909
- First flight: 11 August 1909

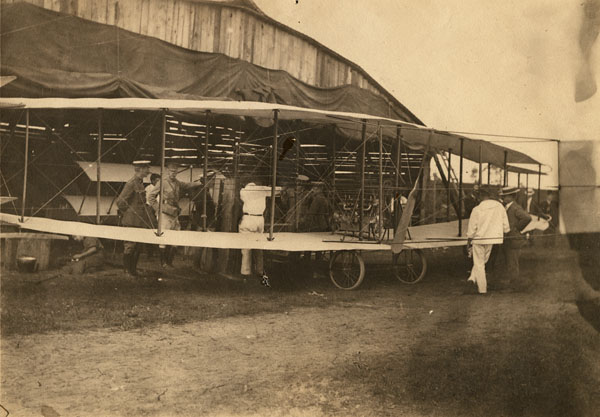
The Baddeck No. 1 in front of a hangar

The Canadian Aerodrome Baddeck No. 1 and Baddeck No. 2 were early aircraft designed by John McCurdy and Frederick W. "Casey" Baldwin, under the guidance of Alexander Graham Bell for the Canadian Aerodrome Company. The Baddeck No. 1 was the first aircraft designed and built in Canada. The aircraft were constructed at Bell's laboratory at Beinn Bhreagh, Baddeck, Nova Scotia using local labour. After being constructed in Baddeck, the Baddeck No. 1 was shipped to Petawawa, Ontario where it made its first flight on 11 August 1909.

== Design and development ==
Following the disbanding of the Aerial Experiment Association (AEA), founding members McCurdy and Baldwin obtained the Canadian patent rights for the AEA Silver Dart, for the express purpose of producing a Canadian-made version. The only main changes initially involved fitting a more powerful engine and reconfiguring the radiator to provide lift. Subsequently, the Baddeck No. 1 and Baddeck No. 2 were built by the Canadian Aerodrome Company, the newly formed company that Baldwin and McCurdy established in March 1909.

== Operational history ==
After construction, Baddeck No. 1 was disassembled and shipped to Petawawa, Ontario for tests by the Canadian Army. The Canadian Aerodrome Company had hopes to land a military contract. Baddeck No. 1 was assembled in Petawawa by 6 August 1909.

The first flight of the Baddeck No. 1 successfully took place at Petawawa on 11 August 1909. A distance of 100 metres was achieved but engine problems resulted in curtailing further flights that day. On the next day, the second flight was short in duration and ended in a rough landing that damaged a wing and the landing gear. Military officials were not impressed and the Baddeck No. 1 was shipped back to Baddeck. After being repaired, and with new coil springs on the undercarriage, the installation of "between-the-wings" ailerons, an added biplane tail and the cambered front elevators replaced by flat ones, the aircraft continued to fly in a series of proving flights at Bentick Farm in Baddeck. After the loss of the AEA Silver Dart and the major damage to the Baddeck No. 1, Baddeck No. 2, essentially a copy of the earlier aircraft, was assembled in Baddeck.

On 13 September 1909, Baddeck No. 2 was towed up the Baddeck River from Beinn Bhreagh to the Bentick Farm testing grounds. The flight tests out of the roughed out field, began on 17 September and continued into October and November 1909.

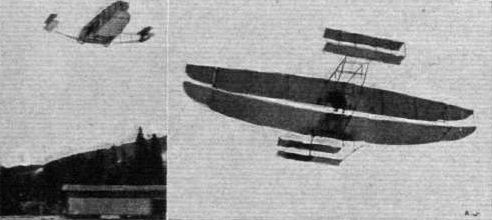
Two images of the Baddeck No. 2 in flight.

On 23 February 1910, with Baddeck No. 1 repaired, McCurdy made its first post-repair flight of 90 meters off the ice on Baddeck Bay.

In March 1910, Baddeck No. 2 was flown over Baddeck Bay, with McCurdy at the controls and on 18 March 1910, with a single float mounted under the center section and stabilizing floats on the ends of the lower wings fitted, the aircraft carried out a trial water landing at Baddeck Bay. Although McCurdy was drenched, the engine and wings remained undamaged, and the test was considered a success, the first seaplane flight in Canada.

Shipped to Montreal in June 1910 to take part in the Montreal Air Meet, the Baddeck No. 1 was flown by McCurdy who crashed on 30 June 1910. Baddeck No. 1 was irreparably damaged, being replaced in flight testing by the Baddeck No. 2.

With mostly McCurdy at the controls, Baddeck No. 2 had a total of 60 flights, 36 at Bentick Farm and 24 off the ice, with testing continuing into November 1910. Dolena MacKay MacLeod, age 23, flew as a passenger with Casey Baldwin on one of those flights over Bentick Farm, becoming the first female air passenger in Canada.

Only the original wingtip ailerons from the Baddeck No. 1 still exist in the Alexander Graham Bell Museum in Baddeck.

== Specifications (Baddeck No. 2) ==
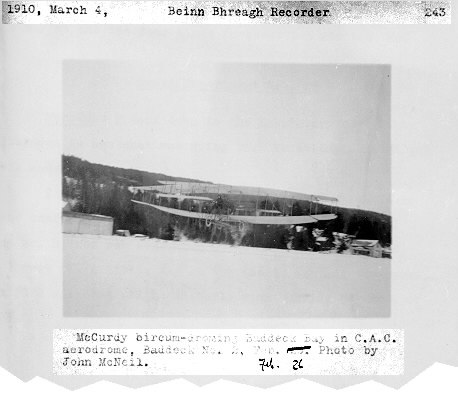
Baddeck No. 2 over Baddeck Bay, piloted by McCurdy, February 1910.

Data from Canadian Aircraft Since 1909

General characteristics

- Crew: 1
- Capacity: 2
- Length: 33 ft 9 in (10.29 m)
- Wingspan: 40 ft 1 in (12.22 m)
- Height: 9 ft 7 in (2.92 m)
- Wing area: 600 sq ft (56 m^{2})
- Max takeoff weight: 1,200 lb (544 kg)
- Powerplant: 1 × Kirkham 40 hp air-cooled piston engine, 40 hp (30 kW)

Performance

- Maximum speed: 40 mph (64 km/h, 35 kn)
- Range: 20 mi (32 km, 17 nmi)
