= John Armistead Wilson =

John Armistead Wilson CBE (November 2, 1879 – October 10, 1954) was a Scottish-born Canadian engineer and aviation pioneer. Along with Major Clare C. MacLaurin, he was responsible for the formulation of Canada's aviation policy following the First World War. He has been dubbed "The Father of Canadian Civil Aviation".

== Biography ==
Wilson was appointed Secretary of the Air Board in 1920, Assistant Director and Secretary of the Royal Canadian Air Force in 1923, Controller of Civil Aviation in 1927 and Director of Air Services in 1941. He retired from public service in 1945.

For his services during the Second World War, Wilson was appointed a CBE in 1945 and was decorated by Norway. He received the Julian C. Smith Memorial Medal of the Engineering Institute of Canada in 1944 and the Trans-Canada Trophy the same year.

His son John Tuzo Wilson was a prominent geophysicist and geologist.
