= Frederick J. Stevenson =

Frederick Joseph Stevenson DFC (December 2, 1895 – January 5, 1928) was a Canadian bush pilot and aviation pioneer. Born in Parry Sound, Ontario, he moved with his family to Winnipeg, Manitoba. In 1916 he joined the Canadian Expeditionary Force, and later serving in the British Royal Flying Corps and Royal Air Force he was awarded a Distinguished Flying Cross as "A very capable flying officer of exceptional judgement and courage, who has been engaged in a number of combats and personally destroyed three enemy aeroplanes". After the war he became a commercial pilot for Western Canada Airways, most notably supporting mining development by flying 23 tons of cargo to a remote exploration site. Flying the material was less costly than packing it in overland, and helped establish the usefulness of aviation for the development of Canada's North. He was killed in an airplane crash in the town of The Pas, Manitoba. From its opening in 1928 until 1958, the Winnipeg airport was named Stevenson Field. His is commemorated in Winnipeg by Stevenson-Britannia School, Stevenson Road, and Stevenson Campus, Red River College Polytechnic. Elsewhere in Manitoba, Stevenson River and Stevenson Lake are named after him.

== See also ==
- History of aviation in Canada
- Fokker Universal
