= William Munroe Archibald =

Canadian aviator

- Born: February 23, 1876; Truro, Nova Scotia, Canada
- Died: November 10, 1949 (aged 73); Toronto, Ontario, Canada
- Occupation: Aviator
- Spouse: Mary Archibald (née Sym)
- Children: Donald Kent Archibald and Alice Theresa Archibald (Mrs. F.G. Rutley) (née Archibald)

William Munroe Archibald (February 23, 1876 – November 10, 1949) was a pioneering Canadian aviator.

== Early years ==
He was educated at McGill University, Montreal, where he graduated in 1897 with an engineering degree. Following extensive experience in various mining camps he joined the staff at Consolidated Mining and Smelting Company at Trail, British Columbia in 1911 to investigate mining properties.

As general manager of mines for the company in 1928, he determined that aircraft could be used to great advantage in mining exploration. During the following year, at age 53, he purchased an aircraft from de Havilland Aircraft Company at Toronto and learned to fly at that company's school. He then organized Cominco Flying Service at Creston, British Columbia, as the company's pilot training school and staffed it with First World War aviators to train young company engineers to flying licence standards.

In his early days with Cominco, he lived at Rossland, British Columbia, but then moved to Creston. He commuted to work almost daily by air from Creston, a road distance of 150 miles, but less than half that in his aircraft. He made the first recorded flight into the interior of British Columbia in 1929, and in 1931 completed a coast-to-coast flight of Canada in a wheeled aircraft.

The peak period for Cominco's use of aircraft under his supervision was reached the following year when ten aircraft were in use almost daily.

Archibald inaugurated the first air route to Stewart, British Columbia and to Ketchikan, Alaska in 1935 and his numerous cross Canada flights earned him the title of "Canada's Flying Businessman".

The McKee Trophy for service to Canadian aviation during 1935 was awarded to Archibald and he went on to become known as the "Father of the Yellowknife Gold Fields".

He retired from Cominco in 1938 to become a senior mining consultant.

== Second World War ==
During the Second World War, Archibald served as a government liaison in Cuba.

He died in Toronto on November 10, 1949.

== Honours and legacy ==
- Trans-Canada (McKee) Trophy (1935)
- Canada's Aviation Hall of Fame (1974)

== Bibliography ==
- Oswald, Mary, They Led the Way, Wetaskiwin: Canada's Aviation Hall of Fame, 1999. ISBN 0-9684843-0-1
- Sutherland, Alice Gibson, Canada's Aviation Pioneers: 50 Years of McKee Trophy Winners, Toronto, McGraw-Hill Ryerson Ltd., 1978. ISBN 0-07-082704-4
