= Maurice "Moss" Burbidge =

Canadian aviator

- Born: April 15, 1896; Brough, East Riding of Yorkshire, England
- Died: September 2, 1977 (aged 81); Victoria, British Columbia, Canada
- Occupation: Aviator

Maurice "Moss" Burbidge (April 15, 1896 – September 2, 1977) was a pioneering Canadian aviator.

== Honours and legacy ==
- Trans-Canada (McKee) Trophy (1932)
- Canada's Aviation Hall of Fame (1974)
