= Trans-Canada Trophy =

The Trans-Canada Trophy, also known as the McKee Trophy, is awarded by the Canadian Aeronautics and Space Institute to a Canadian citizen who has made an outstanding, contemporary achievement in aerospace operations, whether a single act within the year prior to the award or a sustained level of performance over a period of several years. The award was founded in 1927 by James Dalzell McKee (1893–1927) and is the oldest aviation award in Canada.

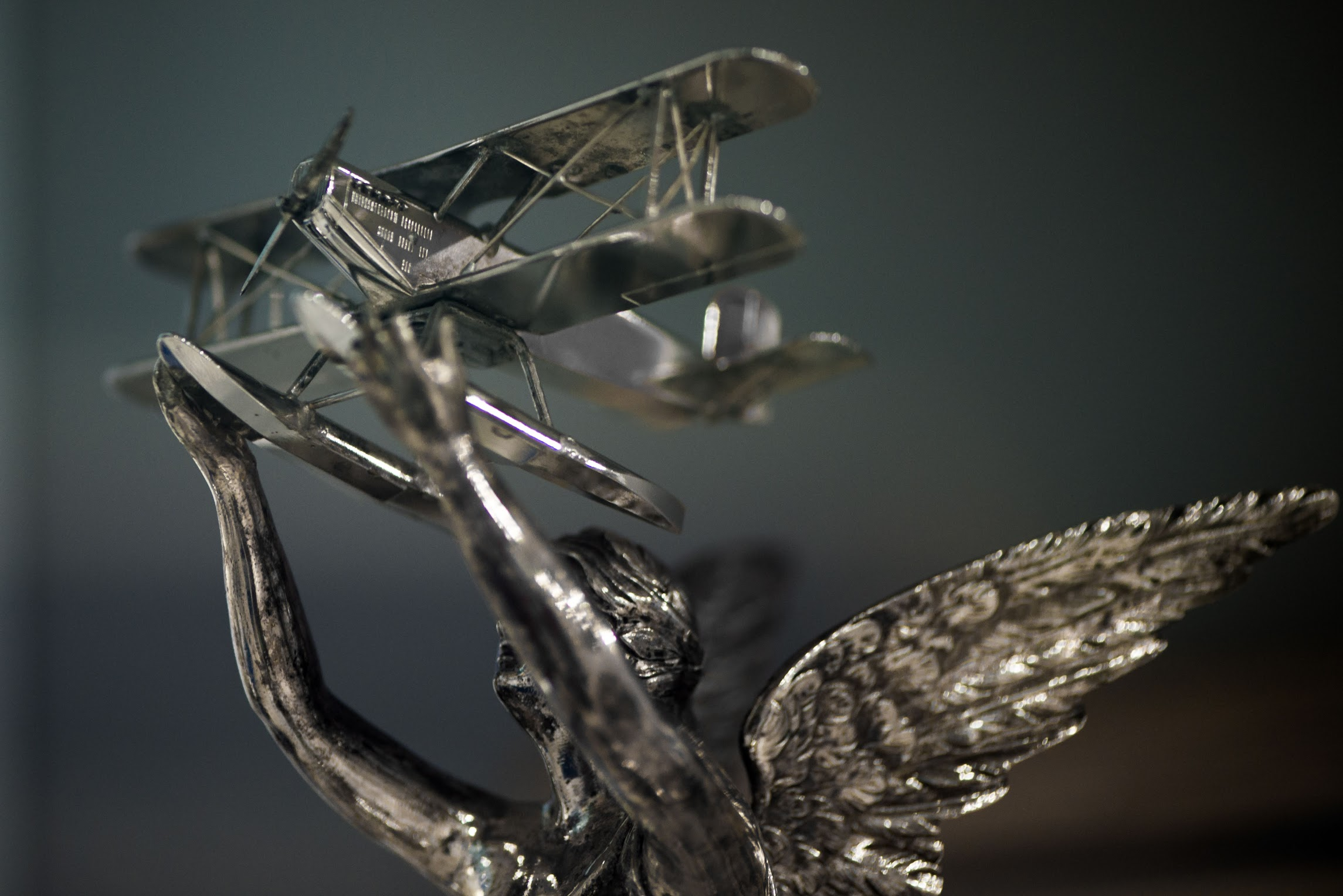
The figure atop the Trans-Canada Trophy (McKee Trophy).

== History ==
In 1926, Royal Canadian Air Force (RCAF) Squadron Leader Albert Earl Godfrey and McKee flew together in a Douglas O-2BS seaplane from Montreal, Quebec to Vancouver, British Columbia. During the course of the flight it was decided a "Trans-Canada Trophy" would be created to commemorate the flight. In appreciation of the RCAF and the Ontario Provincial Air Services, McKee presented the trophy, requesting it be awarded each year to the person who best advanced aviation in Canada. McKee also provided an endowment for a replica to be given to each winner.

The trophy was deeded to the Crown in the person of the Department of National Defence, which controlled all aspects of aviation at the time, both military and civil. In 1971, the administration of the McKee trophy was transferred to the Canadian Aeronautics and Space Institute.

== Winners ==
- 1927 Harold Anthony Oaks*, Western Canada Airways
- 1928 C.H. Dickins*, Western Canada Airways
- 1929 Wilfrid R. "Wop" May*, Commercial Airways
- 1930 Squadron Leader John Henry Tudhope*, Royal Canadian Air Force
- 1931 George H Phillips*, Ontario Department of Lands and Forests
- 1932 Maurice Burbidge*, Edmonton and Northern Alberta Flying Club
- 1933 Walter E Gilbert*, Western Canada Airways
- 1934 Flight Lieutenant Elmer G Fullerton*, Royal Canadian Air Force
- 1935 William M Archibald*, Cominco Flying Service
- 1936 Arthur Massey Berry*, Canadian Airways Ltd.
- 1937 J.P. Romeo Vachon*, Quebec Air Ltd.
- 1938 Philip G. Johnson, (Pilots and Engineers, Trans Canada Air Lines)
- 1939 Murton A Seymour*, Canadian Flying Clubs Association
- 1940 Thomas W Siers*, Canadian Airways Ltd.
- 1941 A. Daniel McLean*, Department of Transport
- 1942 Thomas Mayne Reid*, Imperial Oil Ltd.
- 1943 Thomas Mayne Reid*, Imperial Oil Ltd.
- 1944 John Armistead Wilson *, Department of Transport
- 1945 Grant W.G. McConachie*, Canadian Pacific Airlines
- 1946 Group Captain Zebulon Lewis Leigh*, Royal Canadian Air Force
- 1947 Bernard A Rawson*, Trans Canada Air Lines
- 1948 Flying Officer Roland Burgess West*, Royal Canadian Air Force
- 1949 Dennis K Yorath*, Royal Canadian Flying Clubs Association
- 1950 Carl C Agar*, Okanagan Helicopters Ltd.
- 1951 Philip C Garratt*, de Havilland Aircraft of Canada Ltd.
- 1952 Squadron Leader Keith R Greenaway*, Royal Canadian Air Force
- 1953 Franklin I. Young*, Trans Canada Air Lines
- 1954 Wing Commander Jerauld G Wright*, Royal Canadian Air Force
- 1955 Gerald L MacInnis*, Maritime Central Airways
- 1956 Wing Commander Robert T Heaslip*, Royal Canadian Air Force
- 1957 Wing Commander John G Showler*, Royal Canadian Air Force
- 1958 Janusz Żurakowski*, Avro Aircraft Ltd.
- 1959 Air Commodore John Alexander Douglas McCurdy*, Lieutenant-Governor of Nova Scotia
- 1960 Wing Commander Wilson George Leach*, Royal Canadian Air Force
- 1961 Welland W Phipps*, Bradley Air Services
- 1962 Not Awarded
- 1963 Frank MacDougall, Ontario Department of Lands and Forests
- 1964-65 Not Awarded
- 1966 Philip C Garratt*, de Havilland Aircraft of Canada Ltd.
- 1967 Lieutenant-Colonel Robert A White*, Canadian Armed Forces
- 1968-1972 Not Awarded
- 1973 Max W Ward*, Wardair Canada Ltd.
- 1974 R.H. Fowler*, de Havilland Aircraft of Canada Ltd.
- 1975 John A.M. Austin*, Austin Airways
- 1976 David C Fairbanks (posthumously), de Havilland Aircraft of Canada Ltd.
- 1977 Air Vice Marshall (retired) Albert Earl Godfrey*, Royal Canadian Air Force
- 1978 Colonel R.D. Schultz*, Canadian Armed Forces
- 1979-80 Not Awarded
- 1981 F.D. Adkins, Canadair Ltd.
- 1982 E.N. Ronaasen (posthumously), Canadair Ltd.
- 1983 D.H. Rogers*, de Havilland Aircraft Canada Ltd.
- 1984 Colonel G.N. Henderson (posthumously), Canadian Armed Forces
- 1985 P.Y. Davoud*, Government of Ontario
- 1986 T.M. Watt, Alberta Transportation
- 1987 S.W. Grossmith*, Transport Canada
- 1988 Not Awarded
- 1989 G.A. Neal*, de Havilland Aircraft of Canada Ltd.
- 1990 B. Granley, Echo Bay Mines Ltd.
- 1991 S. Graham* (posthumously)
- 1992 L. Kerr*, Conair Aviation Ltd.
- 1993 Lorna deBlicquy*
- 1994 B.J. Wormworth, Transport Canada
- 1995 The Hon. JusticeVirgil Moshansky, The Court of Queen's Bench of Alberta
- 1996 Allan R. Baker, Baker Aviation Services
- 1997 Not Awarded
- 1998 André O. Dumas, Transport Canada
- 1999 John B. Croll, National Research Council of Canada
- 2000 Joseph Fernand "Frank" Henley *
- 2001 Mr. Wallace K Warner
- 2002 South Pole Rescue Team, Kenn Borek Air Ltd.
- 2003 Captain Robert Piché, Air Transat
- 2004 William Peppler
- 2005 John Maris
- 2006 John Aitken, NRC Institute for Aerospace Research
- 2007 Captain Gordon Lemon, Canadian Armed Forces
- 2008 CF Cormorant, 19 Wing, 442 Transport and Rescue Squadron, Captain Sean Morris, Captain Rob Mulholland, Flight Engineer Cpl Derek Agnew, SAR Tech MCpl Kent Gulliford, and SAR Tech Sgt Yves St. Denis, Canadian Armed Forces
- 2009 Mr. Larry Dufraimont, Bombardier Aerospace
- 2010 Captain S.C. Mullins, Canadian Forces Aerospace Warfare Centre(O)
- 2011 Mr. Cameron Robertson and Dr. Todd Reichert, U of T Human-Powered Ornithopter Project
- 2012 Mr. David Kroetsch and Dr. Michael Peasgood, Aeryon Labs, Inc.
- 2013 Not awarded
- 2014/15 Colonel Chris Hadfield *, Canadian Space Agency
- 2016/17 Charles Ellis and Andris Litavniks, Bombardier Aerospace
- 2018 Kevin W Horton, Contract Test Pilot
- 2019 Colonel(retired) Don Matthews
- 2020 415 Long Range Patrol Force Development Squadron Royal Canadian Air Force

Note: "*" denotes Members of Canada's Aviation Hall of Fame

== Bibliography ==
- Sutherland, Alice Gibson (1978). Canada's Aviation Pioneers: 50 Years of McKee Trophy Winners. McGraw-Hill Ryerson. ISBN 0-07-082704-4.
