= Canadian Bushplane Heritage Centre =

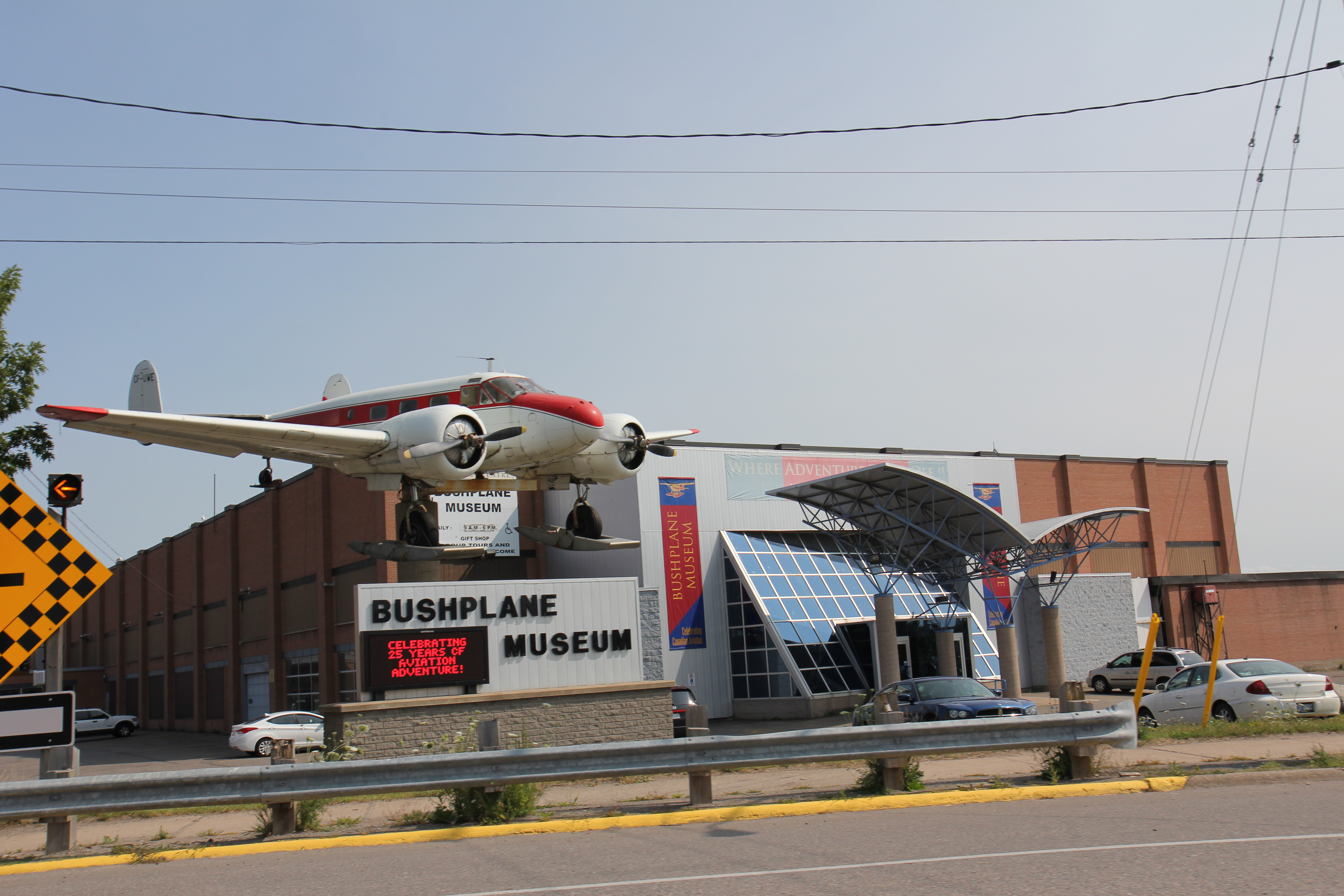
- Bushplane Heritage Centre

- Location in Ontario Canadian Bushplane Heritage Centre (Canada)
- Established: 1987
- Location: Sault Ste. Marie, Ontario, Canada
- Coordinates: 46°30′17″N 84°19′28″W
- Type: Aviation museum
- Website: www.bushplane.com

Canadian Bushplane Heritage Centre (CBHC), located on the north bank of the St. Marys River in Sault Ste. Marie, Ontario, Canada, is dedicated to preserving the history of bush flying and forest protection in Canada. It was founded in 1987 by a group of local volunteers to preserve the province's history in bush planes and aerial firefighting.

The CBHC has a 64,000-square-foot (5,900 m^{2}) hangar containing more than thirty aircraft exhibits.

== History ==
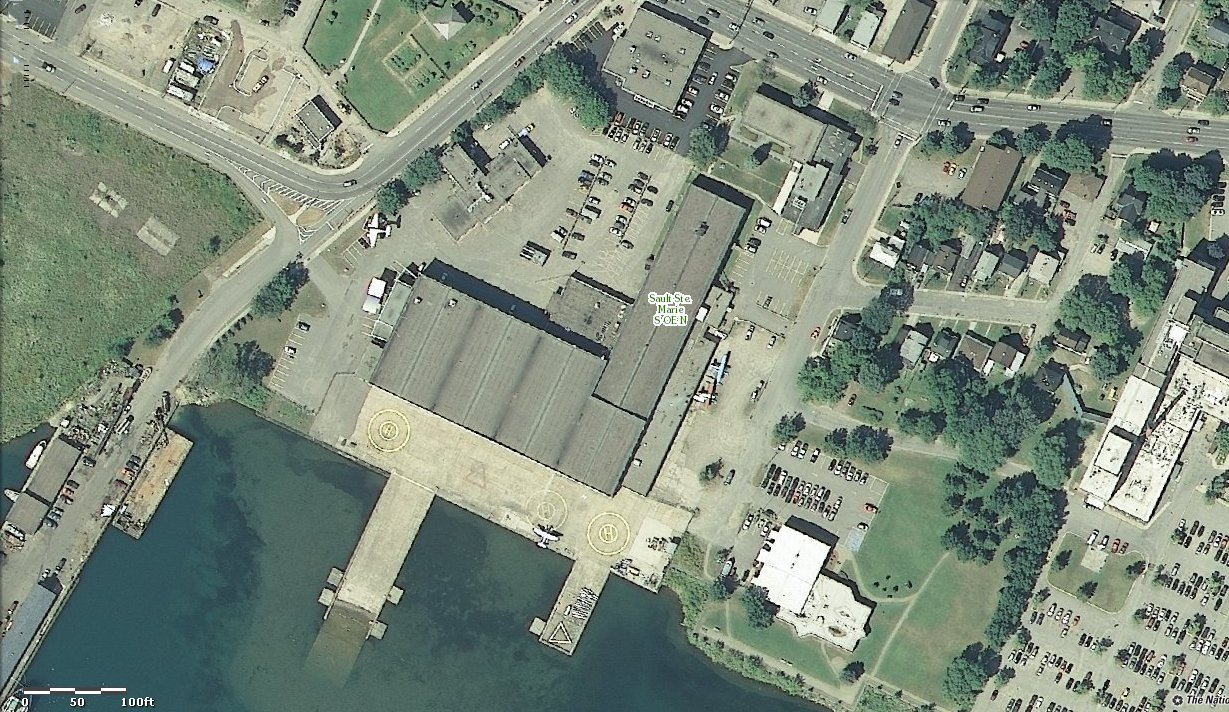
USGS view of the complex

The museum occupies a historically significant air base first established by the Ontario Provincial Air Service in 1924. The Centre's operating revenues are derived from sales from the gift shop, admission fees, and membership dues. The centre does not rely on operating support from the public funds, though corporate costs associated with artifacts and displays have been partially funded through corporate donations and tourist infrastructure programmes. Continued support ensures a strong future and on site development and expansion of the CBHC.

The centre also operates the Sault Ste. Marie Water Aerodrome (46°30′13″N 084°19′30″W).

The museum placed a quarter-scale model of an HS-2L on display in 2024. One month later, the museum released a book about Ontario Provincial Air Service aircraft written by one of their volunteers.

== Exhibits ==
Exhibits at the museum include women in aviation, a film about aerial firefighting, a replica fire tower and a flight simulator. It is also home to the Entomica Insectarium.

== Collection ==
The museum's focus is on floatplanes, bush planes, waterbombers, and forest fire fighting equipment along with other aviation and forestry-related artifacts.

- AEA Silver Dart – replica
- Aeronca 11 Chief
- Aeronca Champion
- Beech 18
- Beech C-45
- Bell 47D
- Buhl CA-6 Air Sedan
- Buhl CA-6 Air Sedan
- Canadair CL-215
- Cessna 172
- de Havilland Canada DHC-2 Beaver
- de Havilland Canada DHC-3 Otter
- de Havilland Canada Turbo Beaver III
- de Havilland DH.83C Fox Moth – replica
- de Havilland DH.89 Dragon Rapide
- Fairchild F-11 Husky
- Fairchild KR-34
- Fokker F.VIIb-3m
- Fokker Super Universal
- Grumman CS2F Tracker
- MacGregor MG-65
- Noorduyn Norseman
- Noorduyn Norseman
- Republic RC-3 Seabee
- Saunders ST-27
- Stinson SR-9 Reliant
- Taylorcraft 20
- Thomas Esperanza

== See also ==
- Virtual Museum of Canada
- List of aerospace museums
- List of airports in the Sault Ste. Marie, Ontario area
