= John Alexander Douglas McCurdy =

20th-century Canadian aviator; Lieutenant Governor of Nova Scotia (1947–52)

The Honourable J.A.D. McCurdy MBE
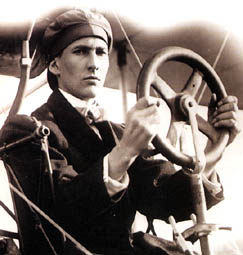

20th Lieutenant Governor of Nova Scotia
- In office 12 August 1947 – 1 September 1952
- Monarchs: George VI; Elizabeth II
- Governors General: The Viscount Alexander of Tunis; Vincent Massey
- Premier: Angus Lewis Macdonald
- Preceded by: Henry Ernest Kendall
- Succeeded by: Alistair Fraser

Personal details
- Born: 2 August 1886 Baddeck, Nova Scotia, Canada
- Died: 25 June 1961 (aged 74) Montreal, Quebec, Canada
- Spouse(s): Margaret Millicent Ball m. first 20 Sept. 1919, and they had three sons and a daughter; m. secondly 2 Oct. 1902 Hattie Maria Mace in Montreal, and they had two daughters and a son; d. 1923 in Washington, D.C.
- Relations: Arthur Williams McCurdy
- Children: J.R.D. McCurdy (Son); Margaret Diana Haddon (daughter)
- Profession: Aeronautical engineer, Aircraft designer, Pilot, Entrepreneur

John Alexander Douglas McCurdy MBE, (2 August 1886 – 25 June 1961) was a Canadian aviation pioneer and the 20th Lieutenant Governor of Nova Scotia from 1947 to 1952. (Note: According to The McCurdys of Nova Scotia, J.A.D. McCurdy's name was John Archibald Douglas McCurdy. Alexander is a common name in the McCurdy family.)

== Early years ==
Born in Baddeck, Nova Scotia to inventor Arthur Williams McCurdy and Lucy O'Brien McCurdy, McCurdy was known as "Douglas". He was schooled at St. Andrew's College in Aurora, Ontario and graduated from the University of Toronto in mechanical engineering in 1907, where he had been a member of Kappa Alpha Society along with his friend Frederick Walker Baldwin. The University of Toronto Year Book for his graduation year (Torontonensis 1907) shows that he was active in rugby and fencing.

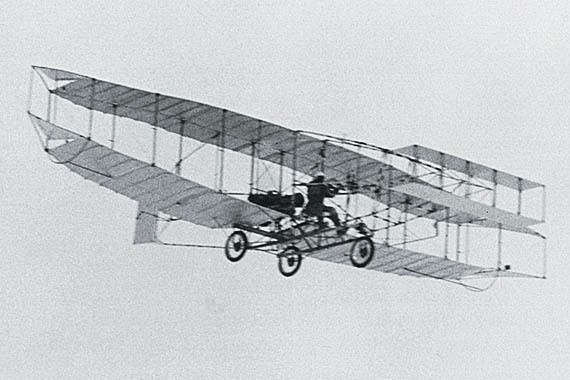
The AEA Silver Dart in flight, J.A.D. McCurdy at the controls, c. 1910

== Aviation ==
In 1907, he joined Alexander Graham Bell's Aerial Experiment Association. In 1908, McCurdy helped another AEA member, Glenn Curtiss to set up the Curtiss Aeroplane and Motor Company.

McCurdy became the first British subject to fly an aircraft in the British Empire when, in February 1909, he piloted the Aerial Experiment Association's Silver Dart off the ice of Bras d'Or Lake in Nova Scotia. The Silver Dart was the first powered aircraft to fly in Canada. In 1910, he was the first Canadian to be issued a pilot's license and the following year, he made the first flight from Florida to Cuba. For the next few years, he continued to set aviation records in Canada and North America, until 1916, when vision problems grounded him.

== First World War ==
In 1915, McCurdy established the first aviation school in Canada, the Curtiss Flying School, operating from 1915 to 1919, and was the first manager of Long Branch Aerodrome, Canada's first airport. He was also instrumental in setting up Canadian Aeroplanes Ltd., an aircraft manufacturing company located in Toronto, Ontario, Canada that built aircraft for the Royal Flying Corps during the First World War. Formed on 15 December 1916, when the Imperial Munitions Board bought the Curtiss (Canada) aircraft operation in Toronto (opened in 1916 as Toronto Curtiss Aeroplanes), Canadian Aeroplanes Ltd. manufactured the JN-4 (Can) Canuck, the Felixstowe F5L flying boat, and the Avro 504.

== Interwar years ==
In 1928, McCurdy created the Reid Aircraft Company in Montreal and became its first president. After a merger, he remained at the helm of the Curtiss-Reid Aircraft Company, a position he held until the advent of war. The most notable product of the company was the Curtiss-Reid Rambler.

McCurdy married Margaret Ball of Woodstock, Ontario, daughter of Margaret and Robert N. Ball, Queens Counsel for Sullivan Co, Ontario.

== Second World War ==
At the beginning of the Second World War, McCurdy became Assistant Director General of Aircraft Production. He remained in that position until 1947.

== Postwar ==
In 1947, McCurdy was appointed Lieutenant Governor of Nova Scotia, a post he continued until 1952. He was awarded the McKee Trophy in 1959 on the 50th anniversary of the flight of the Silver Dart. He attended official ceremonies and sat in the replica Silver Dart built for the occasion. He was also named an honorary air commodore at the time.

After a lengthy illness, McCurdy died in 1961 in Montreal, Quebec, and was buried the following month in Baddeck, Nova Scotia where a family home had been maintained.

== Legacy ==
The McCurdy Award at McGill University in Montreal was introduced in 1954 by the Institute of Aircraft Technicians. The award commemorates the contributions made by John A.D. McCurdy during the development of the aviation industry in North America. Following its creation in 1973, McCurdy was inducted into Canada's Aviation Hall of Fame.

On 27 July 2009 Sydney Airport was renamed J.A. Douglas McCurdy Sydney Airport in his honour. In 2012, he was inducted into the Canadian Science and Engineering Hall of Fame.

== See also ==
- Adventurers' Club of New York
